= Kerala =

State in southwestern India

- State
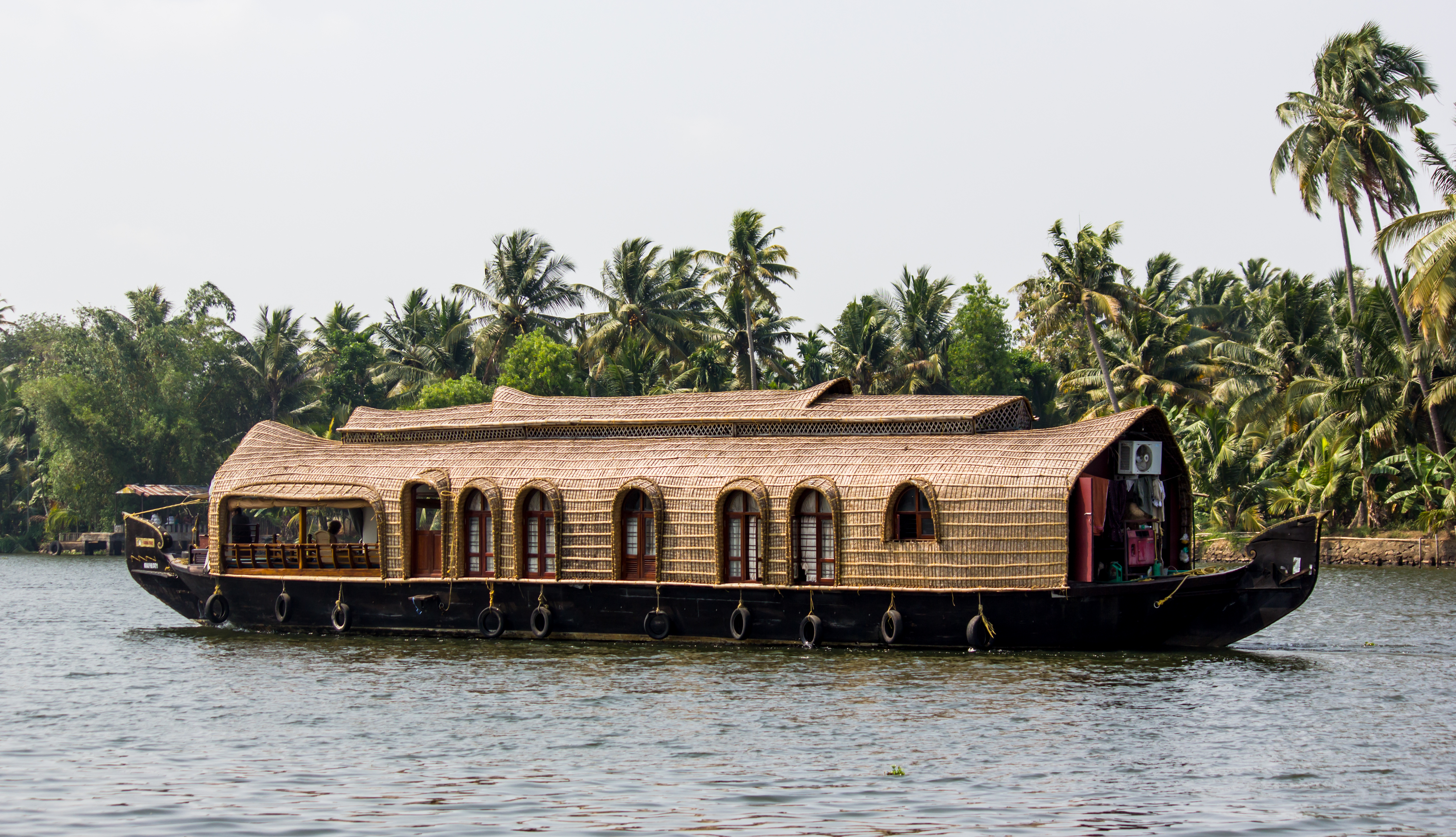
- A houseboat in the Kerala backwaters

- Emblem of Kerala
- Nickname: "God's Own Country"
- Location of Kerala in India
- Coordinates: 10.0°N 76.3°E
- Country: India
- Region: South India
- Previously was: Travancore–Cochin; Malabar district South Canara
- Formation: 1 November 1956
- Capital: Thiruvananthapuram
- Districts: 14

Government
  - Body: Government of Kerala
  - Governor: Om Prakash Mathur
  - Chief Minister: V. D. Satheesan (INC)
  - Chief Secretary: Bishwanath Sinha I.A.S.

Area
  - Total: 38,863 km^{2} (15,005 sq mi)
  - Rank: 21st

Dimensions
  - Length: 560 km (350 mi)
  - Width: 70 km (43 mi)
- Elevation: 900 m (3,000 ft)
- Highest elevation (Anamudi): 2,695 m (8,842 ft)
- Lowest elevation (Kuttanad): −2.7 m (−8.9 ft)

Population (2025)
  - Total: 36,111,000
  - Rank: 13th
  - Density: 890/km^{2} (2,300/sq mi)
  - Urban: 79.42%
  - Rural: 20.58%
- Demonym(s): Keralite, Malayali

Language
  - Official: Malayalam

GDP
  - Total (2025-26): ▲$167.90 billion (nominal) ▲$707.26 billion (PPP)
  - Rank: 11th
  - Per capita: ▲₹317,723 (US$3,400) (nominal) ▲$19,586 (PPP) (11th)
- Time zone: UTC+05:30 (IST)
- ISO 3166 code: IN-KL
- Vehicle registration: KL
- HDI (2023): ▲0.804 Very High (2nd)
- Literacy (2024): 95.3% (4th)
- Sex ratio (2025): 1084♀/1000 ♂ (17th)
- Website: kerala.gov.in
- Symbols of Kerala
- Foundation day: 1 November
- Bird: Great hornbill
- Butterfly: Papilio buddha
- Fish: Green chromide
- Flower: Golden shower tree
- Fruit: Jackfruit
- Mammal: Indian elephant
- Tree: Coconut Tree
- State highway mark
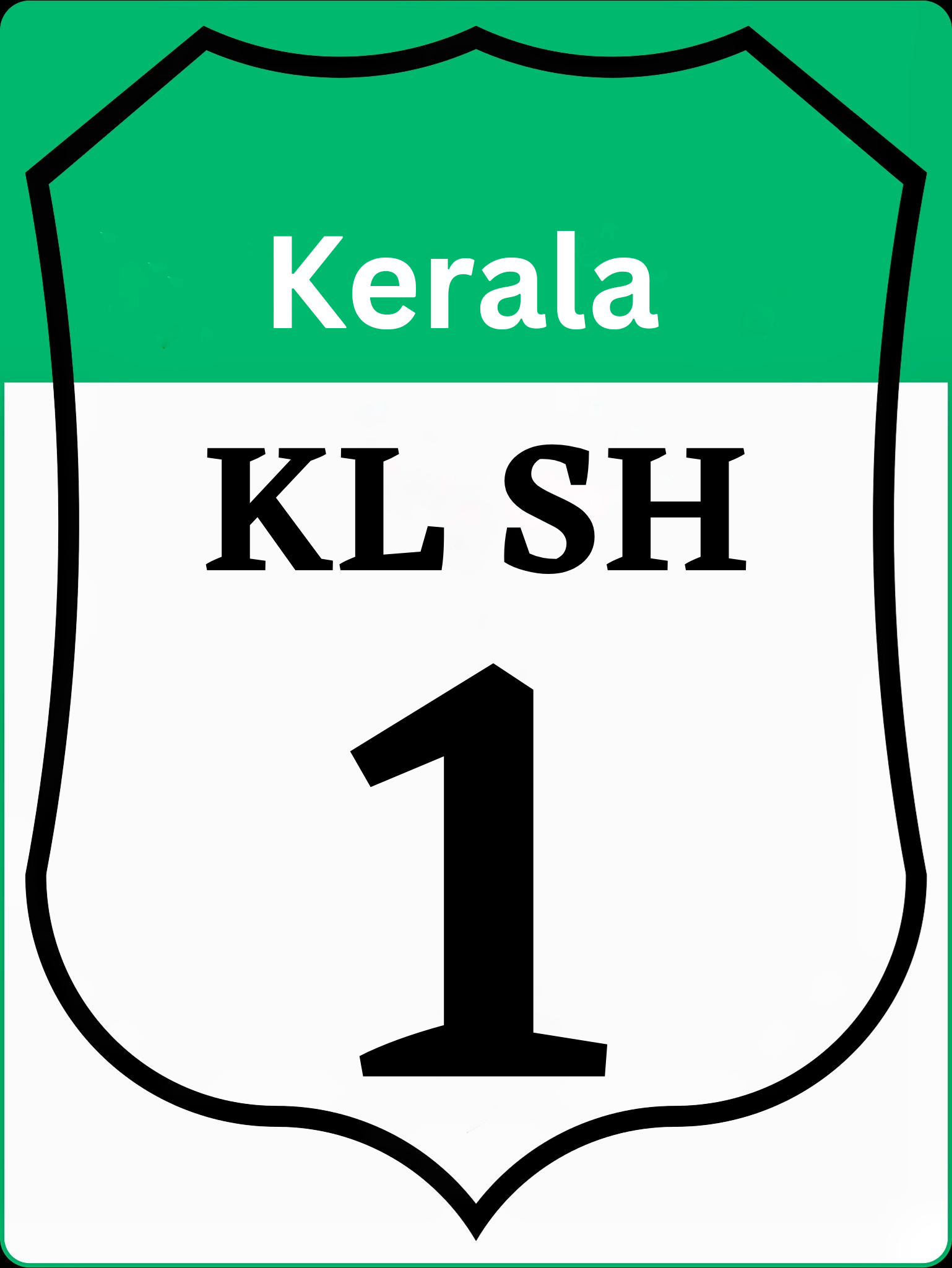
- State highway of Kerala; SH KL1 – SH KL79
- List of Indian state symbols

Kerala (English: /ˈkɛrələ/ / KERR-ə-lə; Malayalam: [keːɾɐɭɐm]), officially Keralam, (Note: Malayalam: [ˈkeːɾɐɭɐm] Kēraḷam) is a state on the Malabar Coast of southern India. It was formed on 1 November 1956 under the States Reorganisation Act, which unified the country's Malayalam-speaking regions into a single state. Covering 38,863 km^{2} (15,005 sq mi), Kerala is primarily a strip of coastal plains sandwiched by the Western Ghats and the Laccadive Sea, bound by Karnataka to the northeast, Tamil Nadu to the east, and the Lakshadweep islands in the western vicinity. With 33 million inhabitants according to the 2011 census, Kerala is the 13th-most populous state in India. Thiruvananthapuram is the capital city while the Kochi metropolitan area is the state's most populated region. Malayalam is the most widely spoken language and, alongside English, serves as an official language of the state.

Kerala has been a prominent exporter of spices since 3000 BCE. The Chera dynasty, the first major kingdom in the region, rose to prominence through maritime commerce but often faced invasions from the neighbouring Chola and Pandya dynasties. In the 15th century, the spice trade attracted Portuguese traders to Kerala, initiating European colonisation in India. After Indian independence in 1947, the kingdoms Travancore and Cochin acceded to the newly formed republic and were merged in 1949 to form the state of Travancore-Cochin. In 1956, the modern state of Kerala was instituted by exchanging peripheral areas with the former Madras State; Malabar district and the Kasargod taluk of South Canara district were merged with Travancore-Cochin to form Kerala, while Kanyakumari district and parts of Shenkottai taluk were annexed to Madras State. Kerala consists of 14 districts since 1984.

Kerala has the highest Human Development Index, at 0.784 in 2018; the highest literacy rate, 96.2% in 2018; the highest life expectancy, at 77.3 years; and the highest sex ratio, with 1,084 women per 1,000 men and the lowest positive population growth rate in India (3.44%). It is the least impoverished and the second-most urbanised state in the country. The state has witnessed significant emigration, particularly to the Arab states of the Persian Gulf during the Gulf Boom of the 1970s and early 1980s, and its economy relies heavily on remittances from a large Malayali expatriate population. Hinduism is practised by more than 54% of the population, followed by Islam and Christianity. The culture is a synthesis of Aryan and Dravidian traditions, shaped over millennia by influences from across India and abroad.

The production of black pepper and natural rubber contributes significantly to the national output. In the agricultural sector, coconut, tea, coffee, cashew, and spices are important crops. The state has a coastline of 595 kilometres (370 mi), and 1.1 million people depend on the fishing industry, which accounts for around 3% of the state's income. The economy is largely service sector oriented, while the primary sector contributes a comparatively smaller share. Kerala has the highest media exposure in India, with newspapers published in nine languages, primarily Malayalam and English. Named as one of the ten paradises of the world by National Geographic Traveler, Kerala is one of the prominent tourist destinations of India, with coconut-lined sandy beaches, backwaters, hill stations, Ayurvedic tourism and tropical greenery as its major attractions. The state has also been repeatedly recognised in international travel rankings for its tourism.

== Name ==
=== Etymology ===
The word "Kerala" is first mentioned as Keralaputra (Note: Mentioned as Keralaputto, Ketalaputto, Keradoputro, and Keralamputra in various edicts.) ('son of Chera[s]') in a 3rd-century-BCE rock inscription left by the Maurya emperor Ashoka (274–237 BCE) in one of his edicts. At that time, one of the three states in the southern part of the Indian subcontinent was known as Cheralam in Classical Tamil. As per linguist Robert Caldwell, Kera and Kela are variants of the word Chera.

There are several theories as to the origin of the word Kerala. Kerala might have originated from the combination of the two words chera and alam meaning 'land of the Cheras'. In Tamil literature, Cheral refers to the oldest known dynasty of the kings who ruled the Kerala region and might have been derived from the Old Tamil word for 'lake'. Keralam may stem from the combination of the words cherive and alam meaning 'land of hill or a mountain slope'. It might also have originated from the Malayalam words kera and alam meaning 'coconut tree' and 'land' respectively, thus meaning 'land of coconuts', due to the abundance of coconut trees in the region.

Kerala was also called Malabar, after the eponymous coast. The region was called as malanadu or malavaram meaning 'hill country' due to its topography, which later became 'Malabar'.

=== Renaming to Keralam ===
There has been a long-standing demand to change the official English name of the state from Kerala to Keralam, the official name of the state in Malayalam. In June 2024, the Kerala Legislative Assembly passed a unanimous resolution to change the state's name from 'Kerala' to 'Keralam', which sought to amend the state's name to reflect its Malayali identity. The proposal was approved by the Union Cabinet on 24 February 2026. After the bill was approved by the Kerala Legislative Assembly on 2 July 2026, the Kerala (Alteration of Name) Bill, 2026 was introduced in the Parliament of India. It was approved by the Lok Sabha on 11 August 2026, and the Rajya Sabha on the next day. Following the president's assent, the name change was effected officially on 25 August 2026 after it was notified by the Ministry of Home Affairs of the Government of India.

== History ==
=== Legend ===
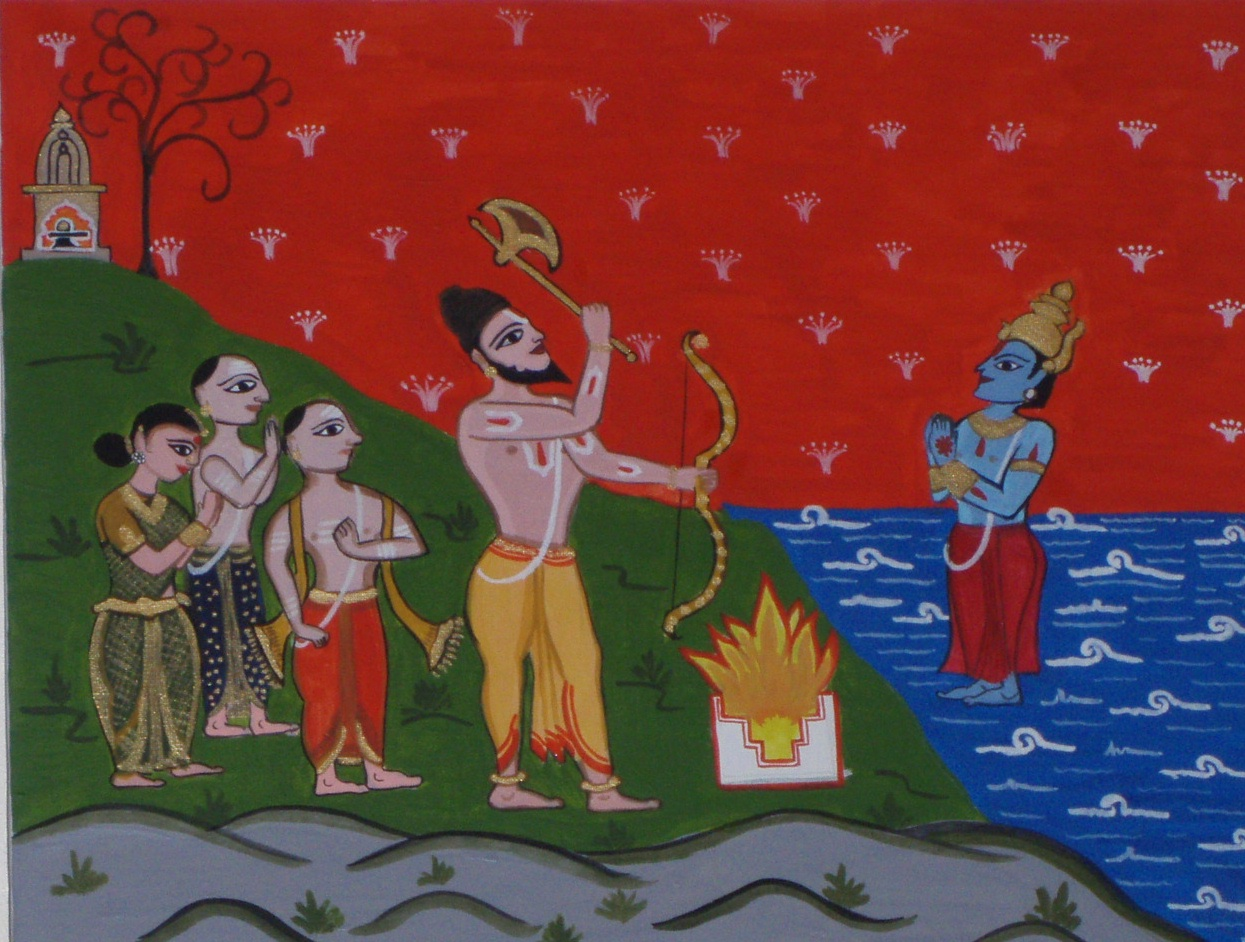
A painting depicting Parashurama, an avatar of Vishnu, commanding Varuna, the Hindu god of ocean, to part the seas

In stories of the Dashavatara from Hindu mythology, the lands of Kerala were recovered from the sea by the axe-wielding warrior sage Parashurama, the sixth avatar (incarnation) of Vishnu. As a result, Kerala is traditionally referred to as Parashurama Kshetram ("The Land of Parashurama"). According to legend, Parashurama threw his axe across the sea, and the water receded to the point where it landed. This land that emerged extended from Gokarna to Kanyakumari. The land that emerged was saline and uninhabitable, so Parashurama invoked the snake king Vasuki, who spat holy poison to purify the soil, transforming it into fertile land. Out of respect, Vasuki and all snakes were appointed as guardians of the land. The legend was expanded and codified in the 17th or 18th century text Keralolpathi. It links the origin of early Kerala institutions—such as land tenure and administration—to Parashurama's story. In medieval times, the Chera king Chenkuttuvan may have emulated the Parashurama tradition by throwing his spear into the sea to symbolise his lordship over it.

A prominent Puranic figure associated with Kerala is Mahabali, an asura and archetypal just king who is said to have ruled the earth from Kerala. He defeated the devas in battle, driving them into exile. In response, the devas appealed to Vishnu, who assumed his fifth avatar as Vamana and, to restore order, pushed Mahabali down to Patala (the netherworld). According to popular belief, Mahabali returns to Kerala once a year, which is commemorated as the Onam festival. The Matsya Purana, one of the oldest among the 18 Puranas, situates the story of Matsya—the first avatar of Vishnu—and king Manu, the first man and ruler of the region—in the Malaya Mountains of Kerala and Tamil Nadu.

=== Pre-history ===
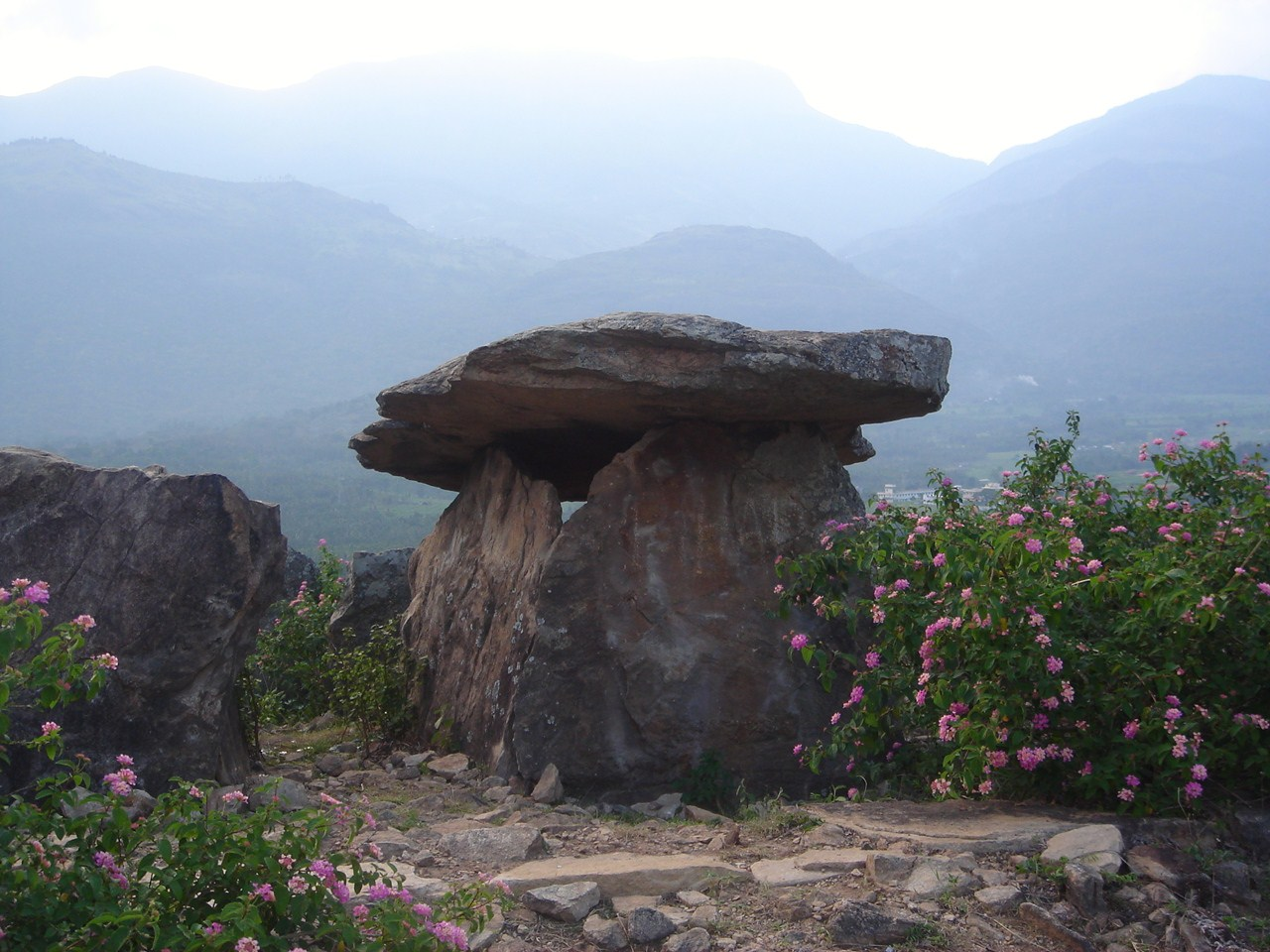
A Neolithic dolmen at Marayur

A substantial portion of present-day Kerala is believed to have been submerged under the sea in ancient times. The discovery of marine fossils near Changanassery supports this hypothesis. Prehistoric archaeological discoveries in Kerala include Neolithic-era dolmens in the Marayur region of the Idukki district, locally known as muniyara—from muni (hermit or sage) and ara (dolmen). Rock engravings in the Edakkal caves in Wayanad date back to the Neolithic period, around 6000 BCE. Archaeological studies have identified Mesolithic, Neolithic and Megalithic sites throughout the region. These findings indicate that the development of early Kerala society and culture began in the Paleolithic Age and progressed through the Mesolithic, Neolithic and Megalithic periods. Foreign cultural interactions also played a role in shaping this development; some historians suggest possible connections with the Indus Valley Civilisation during the late Bronze Age and early Iron Age.

=== Ancient history ===
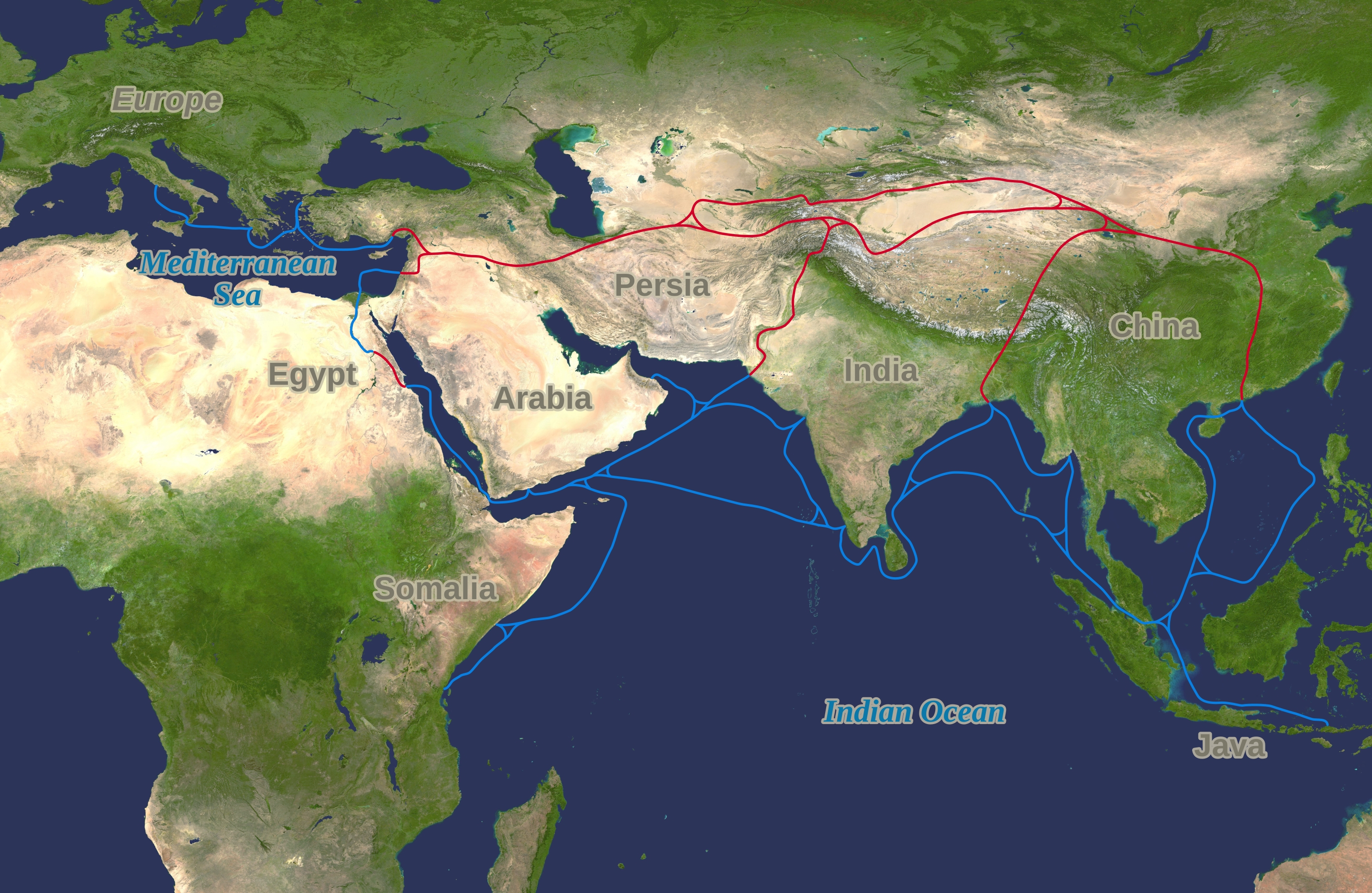
Spice trade routes (in blue)

Kerala has been a major spice exporter since at least 3000 BCE, according to Sumerian records, and it is continues to be referred to as the "Garden of Spices" or as the "Spice Garden of India". The region's spices attracted ancient Babylonians, Assyrians, and Egyptians to the Malabar Coast during the 3rd and 2nd millennia BCE. Arabs and Phoenicians also established trade links with Kerala during this period. The land of Keralaputra was one of four independent kingdoms in southern India during the time of Emperor Ashoka, alongside the Chola, Pandya, and Satiyaputra kingdoms. Scholars generally identify Keralaputra as another name for the Cheras, the earliest major dynasty based in Kerala. Although disputed by some scholars, the mainstream view holds that Malayalam descends from a west coast dialect of Early middle tamil and became a distinct language somewhere between 9th and 13th century, although this spoken dialect likely also preserved some archaisms suggesting an earlier divergence of spoken dialects in the prehistoric period. These southern territories once spoke different dialects of same language and shared similar cultural framework, within a region historically known as Tamilakam. While the Cheras governed most of what is now Kerala, the southern tip of the region fell under the control of the Pandyas, whose trading port is sometimes identified in ancient Western sources as Nelcynda (or Neacyndi). Later, control of the region alternated among the Pandyas, Cheras, and Cholas. The Ays and Mushikas were two other dynasties of ancient Kerala, located to the south and north of the Chera territory, respectively.

By the last centuries BCE, the coast had become an important hub for Greek and Roman trade, particularly in black pepper. The Cheras maintained commercial links with Ancient China, West Asia, Egypt, Greece, and the Roman Empire. In foreign trade records, the region was referred to as Male or Malabar. Principal ports of the time included Muziris, Berkarai, and Nelcynda. The value of Rome's annual trade with Kerala has been estimated at 50 million sesterces. Contemporary Sangam literature describes Roman ships arriving at Muziris, laden with gold in exchange for pepper. One of the earliest Western traders to navigate the monsoon winds to reach Kerala was Eudoxus of Cyzicus, who made the voyage around 118 or 166 BCE under the patronage of Ptolemy VIII, king of the Hellenistic Ptolemaic dynasty in Egypt. Roman establishments in the region's port cities—including a temple of Augustus and barracks for garrisoned Roman soldiers—are recorded in the Tabula Peutingeriana, the only surviving map of the Roman cursus publicus.

Merchants from West Asia and Southern Europe established coastal posts and settlements in Kerala. The Jewish connection with Kerala is believed to date back to 573 BCE. Arab traders had links with Kerala from at least the 4th century BCE; Herodotus (484–413 BCE) noted that goods brought by Arabs from Kerala were sold to Jews in Eden. These Arab traders intermarried with local communities, leading to the formation of the Muslim Mappila community. In the 4th century CE, some Christians migrated from Persia and joined the early Syrian Christian community, which traces its origins to the evangelistic activities of Thomas the Apostle in the 1st century CE. The term Mappila—originally an honorific applied to esteemed foreign visitors—later became associated with the descendants of Jewish, Syrian Christian, and Muslim immigrants, leading to the terms Juda Mappilas, Nasrani Mappilas, and Muslim Mappilas, respectively. According to the traditions of these communities, some of the earliest religious establishments in India were built in Kerala. These include the Saint Thomas Christian churches, the Cheraman Juma Masjid (established in 629 CE), India's first mosque, and the Paradesi Synagogue (built in 1568 CE), the oldest active synagogue in the Commonwealth of Nations.

=== Medieval period ===
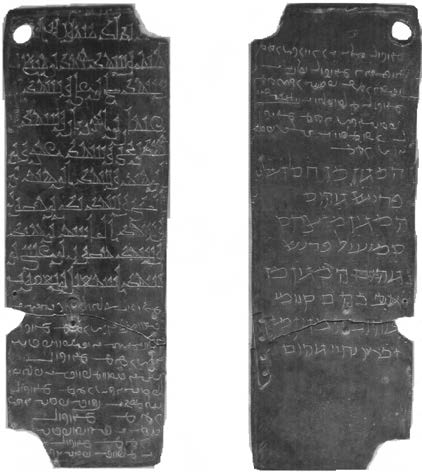
Tharisapalli plates granted to Saint Thomas Christians testify that merchant guilds and trade corporations played a very significant role in the economy and social life during the Kulasekhara period.

A second Chera kingdom (c. 800–1102), also known as the Kulasekhara dynasty of Mahodayapuram, was founded by Kulasekhara Varman and governed over a territory comprising most of present-day Kerala and parts of modern Tamil Nadu. During the early phase of the Kulasekara period, the southern region—from Nagerkovil to Thiruvalla—was controlled by the Ay dynasty. By the 10th century, however, the Ays had lost their power, and the region was incorporated into the Kulashekara realm. Under Kulashekhara rule, Kerala experienced a flourishing period marked by developments in art, literature, trade, and the Bhakti movement within Hinduism.Although disputed by some, the widely held view considers Malayalam to be descended from a dialect of Early middle tamil between 9th and 13th century and a separate keralite identity began to emerge around this time. For administrative purposes, the kingdom was divided into provinces governed by local chieftains called Naduvazhis. Each province was further subdivided into desams, which were overseen by Desavazhis.

A series of Chera–Chola conflicts in the 11th century disrupted foreign trade through Kerala's ports. During this period, Buddhism and Jainism, which had previously coexisted with Hinduism, declined and eventually disappeared from the region. Social structures became increasingly rigid, and caste divisions deepened. The Kulashekhara dynasty ultimately fell in 1102 CE following a combined assault by the Later Pandyas and Later Cholas. In the 14th century, Ravi Varma Kulashekhara (r. 1299–1314) of the southern Venad kingdom briefly established a short-lived supremacy over much of southern India. Following his death, and in the absence of a strong central authority, the region fragmented into thirty small, frequently warring principalities. Among the most powerful were the kingdom of Samuthiri (Zamorin) in the north, Venad in the south and Kochi in the central region. In the 18th century, King Anizham Thirunal Marthanda Varma of Travancore launched a series of military campaigns and annexed territories up to northern Kerala, establishing Travancore as the dominant power in the region. The Kochi ruler sued for peace, and the Malabar region eventually came under direct British rule until Indian independence in 1947.

In the early 15th century, the Ming Chinese admiral Zheng He's treasure fleets made repeated stops at the Malabar ports of Kozhikode, Kollam, and Kochi during his seven voyages between 1405 and 1433, establishing formal tributary relations with local rulers including the Zamorin of Calicut. Calicut, which Zheng He's interpreter Ma Huan described as a great nation in the Indian Ocean (古里國，即西洋大國也, "The country of Guli, is the great country of the Western ocean"), served as the fleet's principal Indian Ocean trading base, and a stone tablet was erected there around 1409 to commemorate the relationship between China and India, though it no longer survives. China also intervened in the rivalry between Calicut and Kochi: for his fifth voyage, Zheng He conferred a seal on the King of Kochi, known to the Chinese as Keyili (可亦里), conferred a Chinese name to a mountain to show Chinese support (named Zhenguo Zhi Shan, 鎮國之山, "Mountain Which Protects the Country"), and delivered a second stone tablet inscribed with a proclamation composed by the Yongle Emperor. Physical and cultural traces of this period persist in Kerala, including the Chinese fishing nets of Kochi, Chinese-derived Malayalam terms for household items such as cheena chatti (wok) and cheena bharani (porcelain jar), and porcelain tiles at the Paradesi Synagogue possibly linked to Chinese gifts. Chinese trade with the region declined after Zheng He's death in 1433 traditionally placed at Calicut during the return leg of the seventh voyage, and the subsequent Ming retreat from maritime expansion; the end of the voyages left Kochi exposed to an eventual invasion by the Zamorin of Calicut.

=== Colonial rule ===
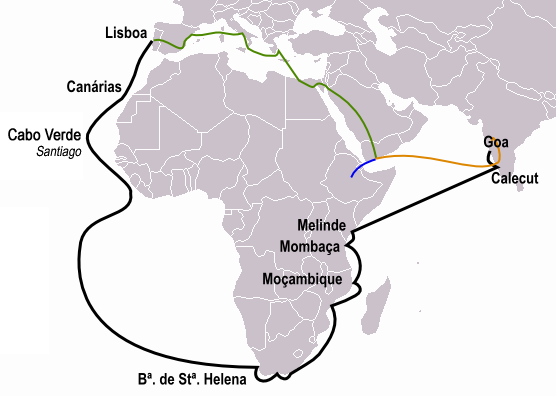
The route taken by Vasco da Gama to reach Kerala (in black)

During the High and Late Middle Ages, Arab traders held a maritime monopoly over the spice trade in the Indian Ocean. This dominance was challenged during the European Age of Discovery when the spice trade—particularly in black pepper—became a major focus of European commercial activity. By the 15th century, the Portuguese had begun asserting control over eastern maritime routes, culminating in Vasco Da Gama's arrival at Kappad, near Kozhikode (Calicut), in 1498. The Zamorin of Kozhikode granted the Portuguese permission to trade with his subjects, leading to the establishment of a prosperous Portuguese factory and fort.

However, tensions arose when the Portuguese attacked Arab traders operating under the Zamorin's protection, causing a breakdown in relations. Seizing the opportunity presented by rivalry between the Zamorin and the King of Kochi, the Portuguese allied with Kochi. When Francisco de Almeida was appointed Viceroy of Portuguese India in 1505, he established his headquarters at Fort Kochi (Fort Emmanuel), rather than in Kozhikode. Under his administration, the Portuguese consolidated their influence by building several fortifications along the Malabar Coast. Despite these advances, the Portuguese faced significant resistance from the Zamorin's naval forces, particularly under the command of the Kunjali Marakkars—admirals of Kozhikode—who launched effective maritime campaigns. This resistance eventually forced the Portuguese to seek a treaty. In 1571, the Zamorin's forces defeated the Portuguese in the Battle of Chaliyam Fort, marking a major setback for Portuguese ambitions in the region.

The Portuguese were eventually supplanted by the Dutch East India Company, which capitalised on ongoing conflicts between the Kozhikode and Kochi to gain control over trade in the region. However, the Dutch too faced military resistance, most notably from Marthanda Varma of the Travancore royal family. After a decisive Dutch defeat at the Battle of Colachel in 1741, the Treaty of Mavelikkara was signed in 1753, forcing the Dutch to withdraw from regional political affairs and confining their role to trade. Marthanda Varma continued his military campaigns, establishing Travancore as the preeminent power in Kerala.

In 1766, Hyder Ali, ruler of Mysore, invaded northern Kerala, and his son and successor, Tipu Sultan, launched military campaigns against the expanding British East India Company. These confrontations contributed to two of the four Anglo-Mysore Wars. By the early 1790s, Tipu Sultan was forced to cede the Malabar district and South Kanara to the British, and these regions were annexed into the Madras Presidency of British India in 1792. The British East India Company also secured tributary alliances with Kochi in 1791 and Travancore in 1795. By the end of 18th century, the entirety of Kerala was either directly administered by the British or under their suzerainty.

In the 20th century, Kerala was the site of several major uprisings during the Indian independence movement. Among the most notable was the 1921 Malabar Rebellion, in which Mappila Muslims of the Malabar region rioted against Hindu zamindars (landlords) and British colonial authorities. Social reform moments also gained momentum during this period, particularly those challenging caste-based discrimination. A major milestone was the Temple Entry Proclamation of 1936 in Travancore, which granted lower-caste Hindus the right to enter temples previously restricted to upper castes.

=== State of India ===
After the partition of India into the independent dominions of India and Pakistan in 1947, the princely states of Travancore and Kochi acceded to the Union of India. On 1 July 1949, the two states were merged to form Travancore-Cochin. On 1 November 1956, the taluk of Kasargod from the South Kanara district of Madras, the Malabar district of Madras State (excluding Gudalur taluk of Nilgiris district, Lakshadweep, Topslip, and the Attappadi forest east of Anakatti), and the state of Travancore-Cochin—excluding four southern taluks (Kanyakumari district and Shenkottai taluks), which were transferred to Tamil Nadu—were merged to form the state of Kerala under the States Reorganisation Act. A Communist-led government under E. M. S. Namboodiripad was formed following the first elections for the new Kerala Legislative Assembly in 1957. It was among the earliest democratically elected Communist governments in the world, following Communist electoral success in the Republic of San Marino in 1945.

== Geography ==
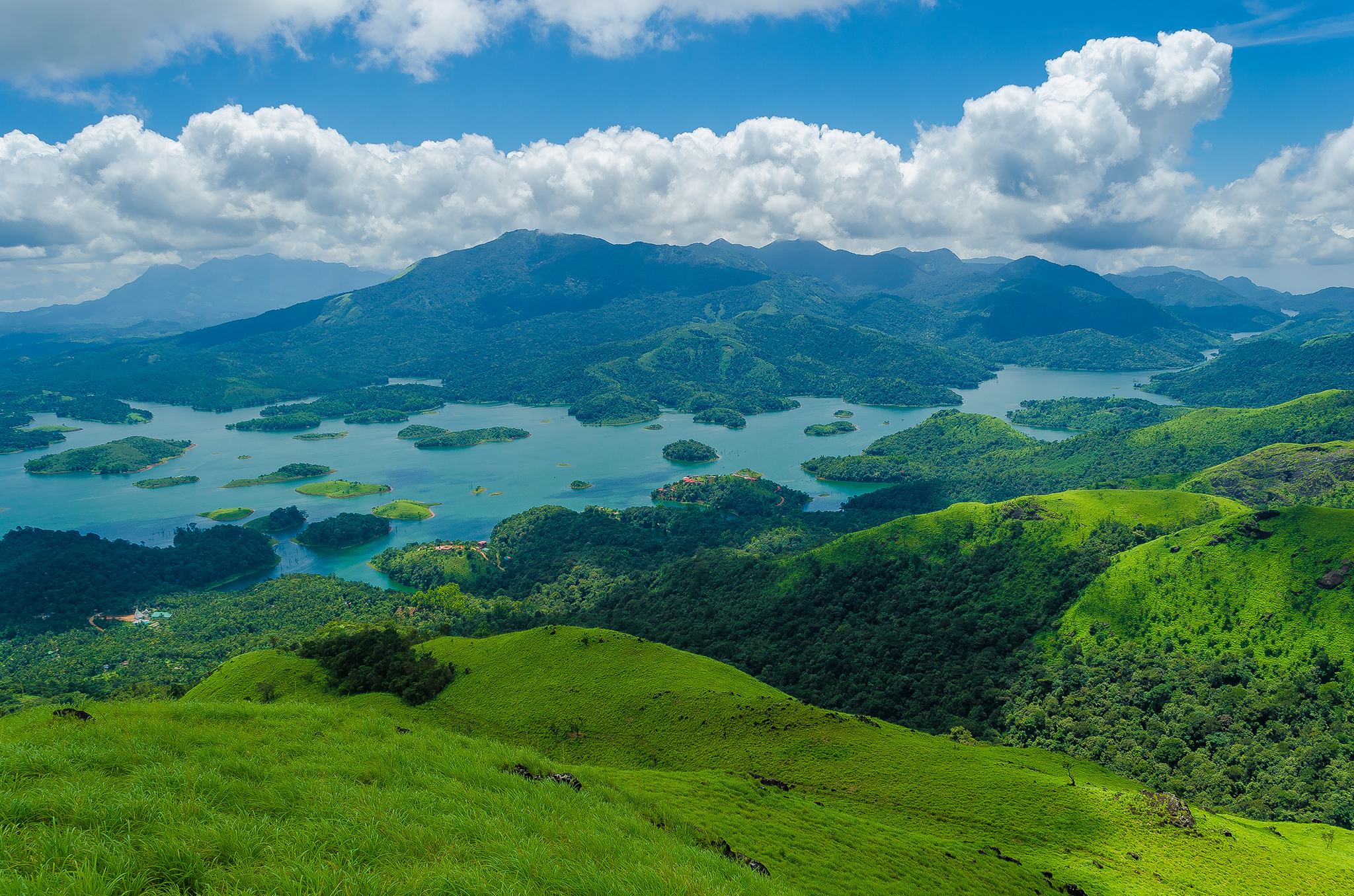
Western Ghats at Wayanad

The state is wedged between the Laccadive Sea and the Western Ghats. Lying between northern latitudes 8°18' and 12°48' and eastern longitudes 74°52' and 77°22', Kerala experiences humid tropical rainforest climate with some cyclones. The state has a coast of 590 km (370 mi) and the width of the state varies between 11 and 121 kilometres (7 and 75 mi). Geographically, Kerala can be divided into three climatically distinct regions: the eastern highlands; rugged and cool mountainous terrain, the central mid-lands; rolling hills, and the western lowlands; coastal plains. Pre-Cambrian and Pleistocene geological formations compose the bulk of Kerala's terrain. A catastrophic flood in Kerala in 1341 CE drastically modified its terrain and consequently affected its history; it also created a natural harbour for spice transport. The eastern region of Kerala consists of high mountains, gorges and deep-cut valleys immediately west of the Western Ghats' rain shadow. 41 of Kerala's west-flowing rivers, and 3 of its east-flowing ones originate in this region. The Western Ghats form a wall of mountains interrupted only near Palakkad; hence also known Palghat, where the Palakkad Gap breaks. The Western Ghats rise on average to 1,500 metres (4,900 feet) above sea level, while the highest peaks reach around 2,500 metres (8,200 feet).

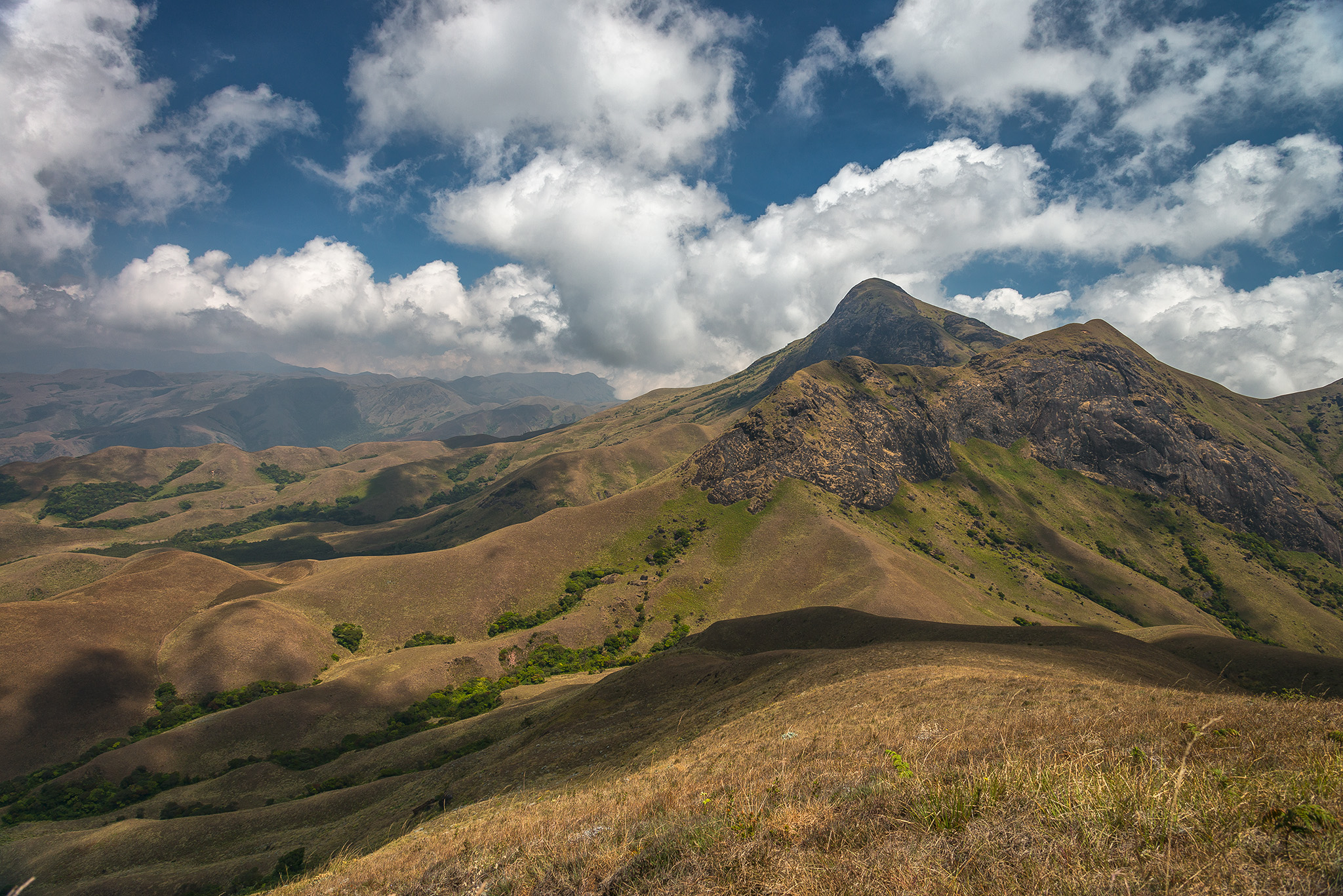
Anamudi, the highest peak in the state.

Anamudi in the Idukki district is the highest peak in south India, is at an elevation of 2,695 m (8,842 ft). The Western Ghats mountain chain is recognised as one of the world's eight "hottest hotspots" of biological diversity and is listed among UNESCO World Heritage Sites. The chain's forests are considered to be older than the Himalaya mountains. The Athirappilly Falls, which is situated on the background of Western Ghat mountain ranges, is also known as The Niagara of India. It is located in the Chalakudy River and is the largest waterfall in the state. Wayanad is the sole Plateau in Kerala. The eastern regions in the districts of Wayanad, Malappuram (Chaliyar valley at Nilambur), and Palakkad (Attappadi Valley), which together form parts of the Nilgiri Biosphere Reserve and a continuation of the Mysore Plateau, are known for natural Gold fields, along with the adjoining districts of Karnataka. Minerals including Ilmenite, Monazite, Thorium, and Titanium, are found in the coastal belt of Kerala. Kerala's coastal belt of Karunagappally is known for high background radiation from thorium-containing monazite sand. In some coastal panchayats, median outdoor radiation levels are more than 4 mGy/yr and, in certain locations on the coast, it is as high as 70 mGy/yr.

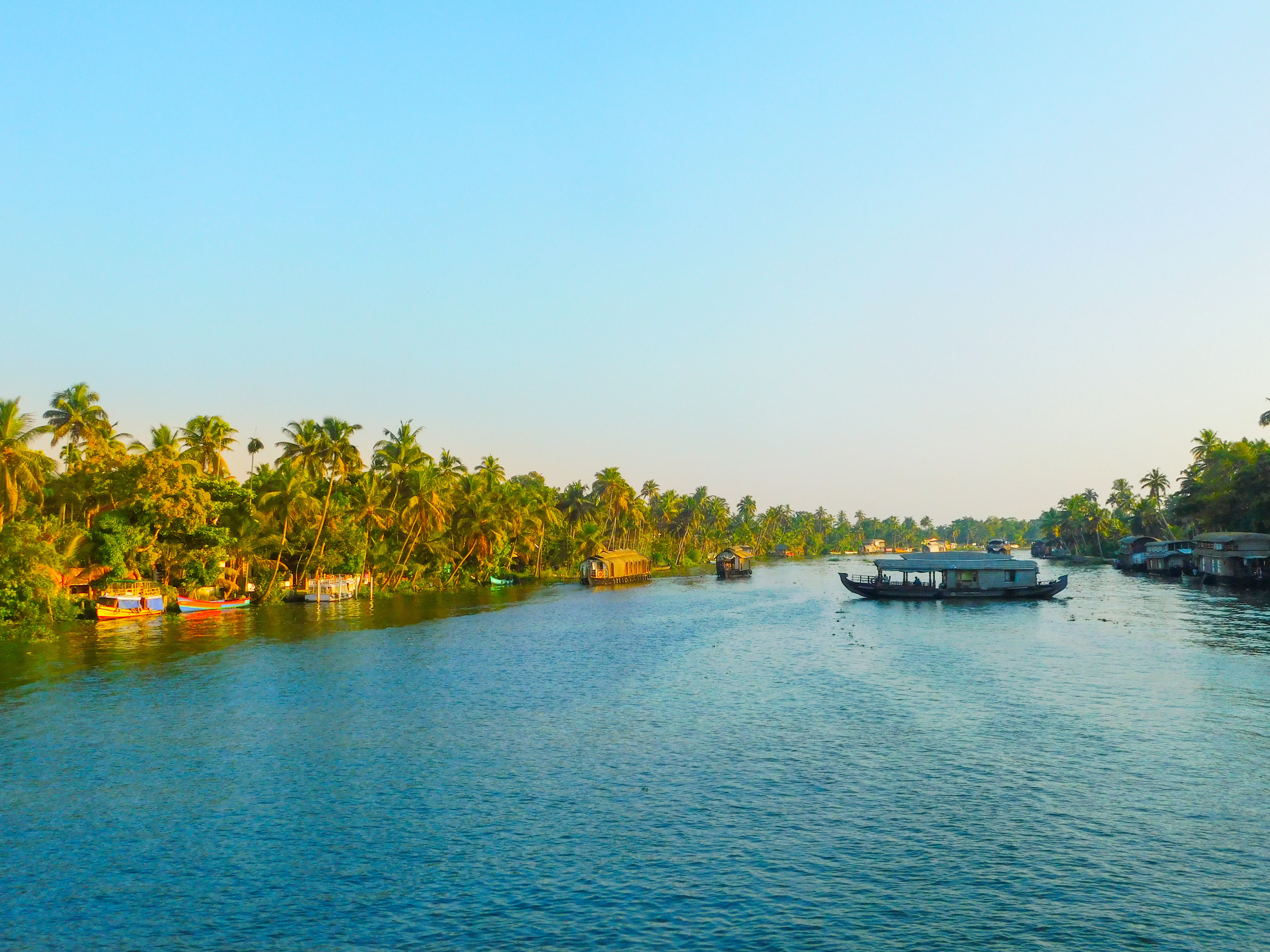
Vembanad, a part of Kerala backwaters, is the longest lake in India.

Kerala's western coastal belt is relatively flat compared to the eastern region, and is criss-crossed by a network of interconnected brackish canals, lakes, estuaries, and rivers known as the Kerala Backwaters. Kuttanad, also known as The Rice Bowl of Kerala, has the lowest altitude in India, and is also one of the few places in world where cultivation takes place below sea level. The country's longest lake Vembanad, dominates the backwaters; it lies between Alappuzha and Kochi and is about 200 km^{2} (77 sq mi) in area. Around eight percent of India's waterways are found in Kerala. Kerala's 44 rivers include the Periyar; 244 kilometres (152 mi), Bharathapuzha; 209 kilometres (130 mi), Pamba; 176 kilometres (109 mi), Chaliyar; 169 kilometres (105 mi), Kadalundipuzha; 130 kilometres (81 mi), Chalakudipuzha; 130 kilometres (81 mi), Valapattanam; 129 kilometres (80 mi) and the Achankovil River; 128 kilometres (80 mi). The average length of the rivers is 64 kilometres (40 mi). Many of the rivers are small and entirely fed by monsoon rain. As Kerala's rivers are small and lacking in delta, they are more prone to environmental effects. The rivers face problems such as sand mining and pollution. The state experiences several natural hazards like landslides, floods and droughts. The state was also affected by the 2004 Indian Ocean tsunami, and in 2018 received the worst flooding in nearly a century. In 2024, Kerala experienced its worst landslides in history.

=== Climate ===
With around 120–140 rainy days per year, Kerala has a wet and maritime tropical climate influenced by the seasonal heavy rains of the southwest summer monsoon and northeast winter monsoon. Around 65% of the rainfall occurs from June to August corresponding to the Southwest monsoon, and the rest from September to December corresponding to Northeast monsoon. The moisture-laden winds of the Southwest monsoon, on reaching the southernmost point of the Indian Peninsula, because of its topography, divides into two branches; the "Arabian Sea Branch" and the "Bay of Bengal Branch". The "Arabian Sea Branch" of the Southwest monsoon first hits the Western Ghats, making Kerala the first state in India to receive rain from the Southwest monsoon. The distribution of pressure patterns is reversed in the Northeast monsoon, during this season the cold winds from North India pick up moisture from the Bay of Bengal and precipitate it on the east coast of peninsular India. In Kerala, the influence of the Northeast monsoon is seen in southern districts only. Kerala's rainfall averages 2,923 mm (115 in) annually. Some of Kerala's drier lowland regions average only 1,250 mm (49 in); the mountains of the eastern Idukki district receive more than 5,000 mm (197 in) of orographic precipitation: the highest in the state. In eastern Kerala, a drier tropical wet and dry climate prevails. During the summer, the state is prone to gale-force winds, storm surges, cyclone-related torrential downpours, occasional droughts, and rises in sea level. The mean daily temperature ranges from 19.8 °C to 36.7 °C. Mean annual temperatures range from 25.0 to 27.5 °C in the coastal lowlands to 20.0–22.5 °C in the eastern highlands.

=== Flora and fauna ===
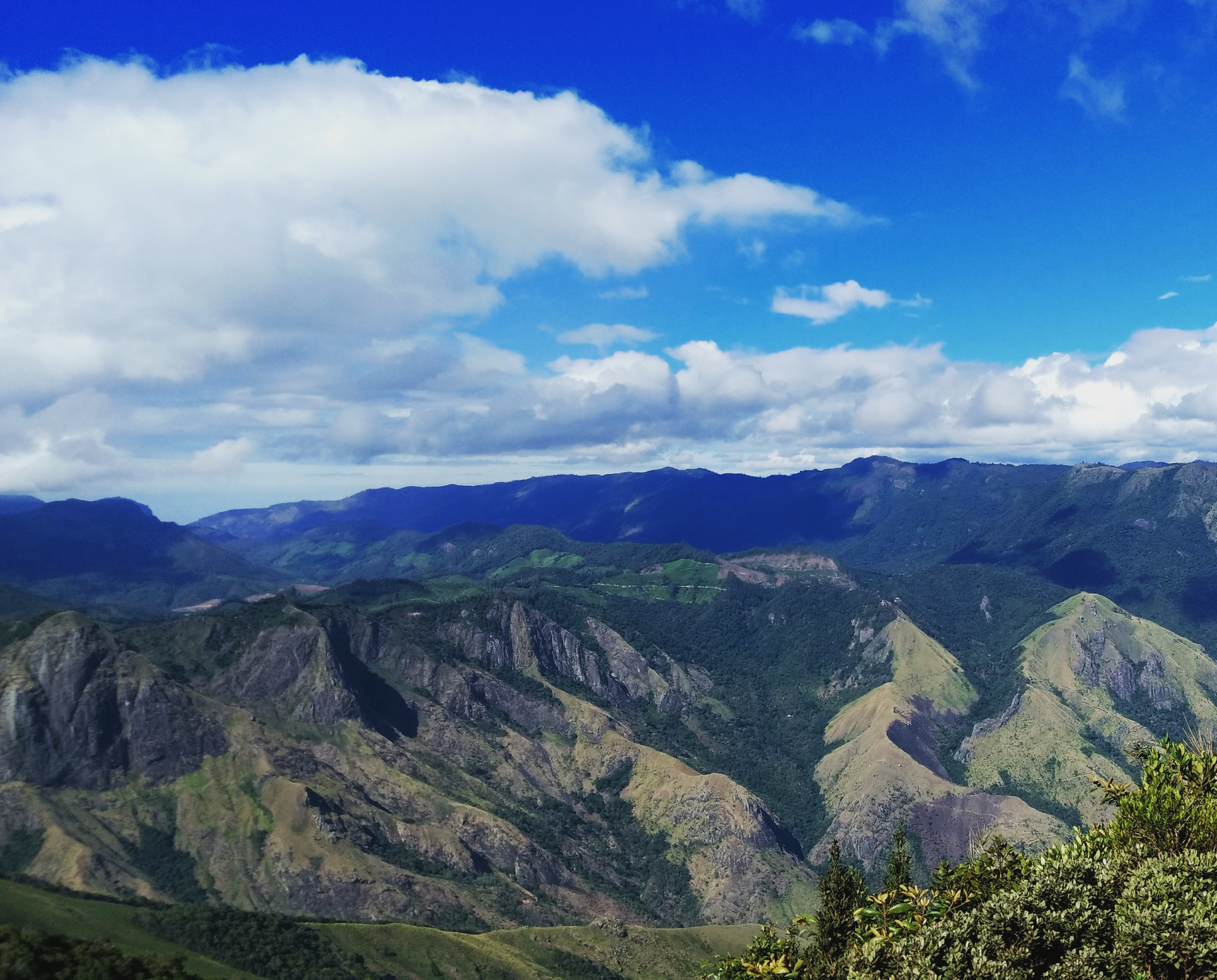
The Cardamom Hills are notable for their biodiversity

Most of the biodiversity is concentrated and protected in the Western Ghats. Three-quarters of the land area of Kerala was under thick forest up to the 18th century. As of 2004, over 25% of India's 15,000 plant species are in Kerala. Out of the 4,000 flowering plant species; 1,272 of which are endemic to Kerala, 900 are medicinal, and 159 are threatened. Its 9,400 km^{2} (3,600 sq mi) of forests include tropical wet evergreen and semi-evergreen forests (lower and middle elevations—3,470 km^{2}), tropical moist and dry deciduous forests (mid-elevations—4,100 km^{2} and 100 km^{2} (39 sq mi), respectively), and montane subtropical and temperate (shola) forests (highest elevations—100 km^{2}). Altogether, 24% of Kerala is forested. Four of the world's Ramsar Convention listed wetlands—Lake Sasthamkotta, Ashtamudi Lake, Thrissur-Ponnani Kole Wetlands, and the Vembanad-Kol wetlands—are in Kerala, as well as 1,455.4 km^{2} (561.9 sq mi) of the vast Nilgiri Biosphere Reserve and 1,828 km^{2} (706 sq mi) of the Agasthyamala Biosphere Reserve. Subjected to extensive clearing for cultivation in the 20th century, much of the remaining forest cover is now protected from clearfelling. Eastern Kerala's windward mountains shelter tropical moist forests and tropical dry forests, which are common in the Western Ghats. The world's oldest teak plantation 'Conolly's Plot' is in Nilambur.

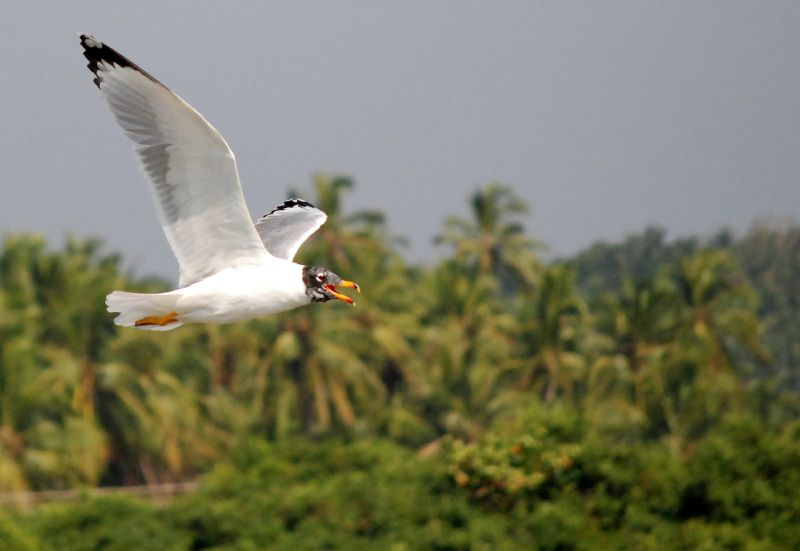
A migratory Pallas's gull in Kadalundi Bird Sanctuary

Kerala's fauna are notable for their diversity and high rates of endemism: it includes 118 species of mammals (1 endemic), 500 species of birds, 189 species of freshwater fish, 173 species of reptiles (10 of them endemic), and 151 species of amphibians (36 endemic). These are threatened by extensive habitat destruction, including soil erosion, landslides, salinisation, and resource extraction. In the forests, sonokeling, Dalbergia latifolia, anjili, mullumurikku, Erythrina, and Cassia number among the more than 1,000 species of trees in Kerala. Other plants include bamboo, wild black pepper, wild cardamom, the calamus rattan palm, and aromatic vetiver grass, Vetiveria zizanioides. Indian elephant, Bengal tiger, Indian leopard, Nilgiri tahr, common palm civet, and grizzled giant squirrels are also found in the forests. Reptiles include the king cobra, viper, python, and mugger crocodile. Kerala's birds include the Malabar trogon, the great hornbill, Kerala laughingthrush, darter and southern hill myna. In the lakes, wetlands, and waterways, fish such as Kadu, Red Line Torpedo Barb and choottachi; orange chromide—Etroplus maculatus are found. Recently, a newly described tardigrade (water bears) species collected from Vadakara coast of Kerala named after Kerala State; Stygarctus keralensis.

== Regions, districts and cities ==
The state's 14 districts are distributed among six regions: North Malabar (far-north Kerala), South Malabar (north-central Kerala), Kochi (central Kerala), Northern Travancore (south-central Kerala), Central Travancore (southern Kerala) and Southern Travancore (far-south Kerala). The districts that serve as administrative regions for taxation and land revenue purposes are further subdivided into 27 revenue divisions and 77 taluks, which have fiscal and administrative powers over settlements within their borders, including maintenance of local land records. Kerala's taluks are further subdivided into 1,674 revenue villages. Since the 73rd and 74th Constitutional Amendments, local self-government institutions in Kerala function as the third tier of government, comprising 14 District Panchayats, 152 Block Panchayats, and 941 Grama Panchayats for rural governance, and 87 Municipalities, six Municipal Corporations for urban governance. Mahé, a part of the Indian union territory of Puducherry, though 647 kilometres (402 mi) away from it, is a coastal exclave surrounded by Kerala on all of its landward approaches. The Kannur District surrounds Mahé on three sides with the Kozhikode District on the fourth.

In 1664, the municipality of Fort Kochi was established by Dutch Malabar, making it the first municipality in the Indian subcontinent, which was dissolved when the Dutch authority got weaker in the 18th century. The municipalities of Kozhikode, Palakkad, Fort Kochi, Kannur, and Thalassery, were founded on 1 November 1866 of the British Indian Empire, making them the first modern municipalities in the state of Kerala. The Municipality of Thiruvananthapuram came into existence in 1920. After two decades, during the reign of Sree Chithira Thirunal, Thiruvananthapuram Municipality was converted into Corporation on 30 October 1940, making it the oldest Municipal Corporation of Kerala. The first Municipal Corporation founded after the independence of India as well as the second-oldest Municipal Corporation of the state was the Kozhikode Municipal Corporation in the year 1962. There are six municipal corporations in Kerala that govern Thiruvananthapuram, Kozhikode, Kochi, Kollam, Thrissur, and Kannur. The Thiruvananthapuram Municipal Corporation is the largest corporation in Kerala while Kochi metropolitan area named Kochi UA is the largest urban agglomeration. According to a survey by economics research firm Indicus Analytics in 2007, Thiruvananthapuram, Kozhikode, Kochi, Kollam, Thrissur are among the "best cities in India to live"; the survey used parameters such as health, education, environment, safety, public facilities and entertainment to rank the cities.

== Government and administration ==
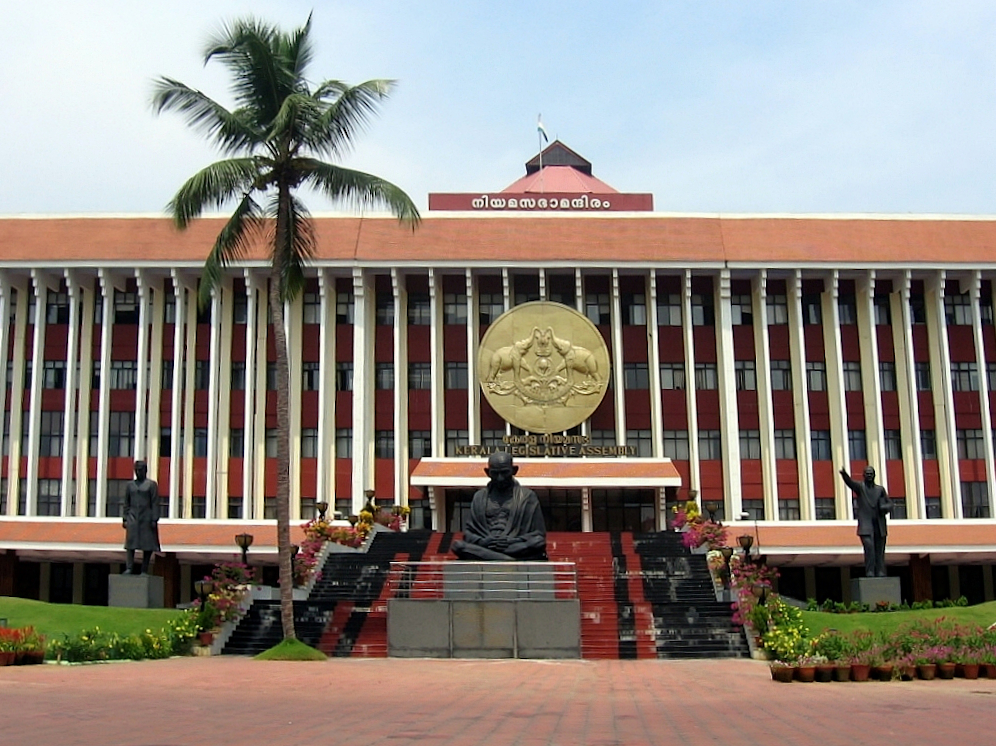
Kerala Legislative Assembly building in Thiruvananthapuram

The state is governed by a parliamentary system of representative democracy. Kerala has a unicameral legislature. The Kerala Legislative Assembly also known as Niyama Sabha, consists of 140 members who are elected for five-year terms. The state elects 20 members to the Lok Sabha, the lower house of the Indian Parliament, and nine members to the Rajya Sabha, the upper house. The Government of Kerala is a democratically elected body in India with the governor as its constitutional head and is appointed by the president of India for a five-year term. The leader of the party or coalition with a majority in the legislative assembly is appointed as the chief minister by the governor, and the council of ministers is appointed by the governor on the advice of the chief minister. The governor remains a ceremonial head of the state, while the chief minister and his council are responsible for day-to-day government functions. The council of ministers consists of cabinet ministers and ministers of state (MoS). The secretariat headed by the chief secretary assists the council of ministers in formulation and implementation of government policies. The chief secretary is the senior-most civil servant, is the chief coordinating officer of the state administration and serves as the ex-officio secretary to the council of ministers.

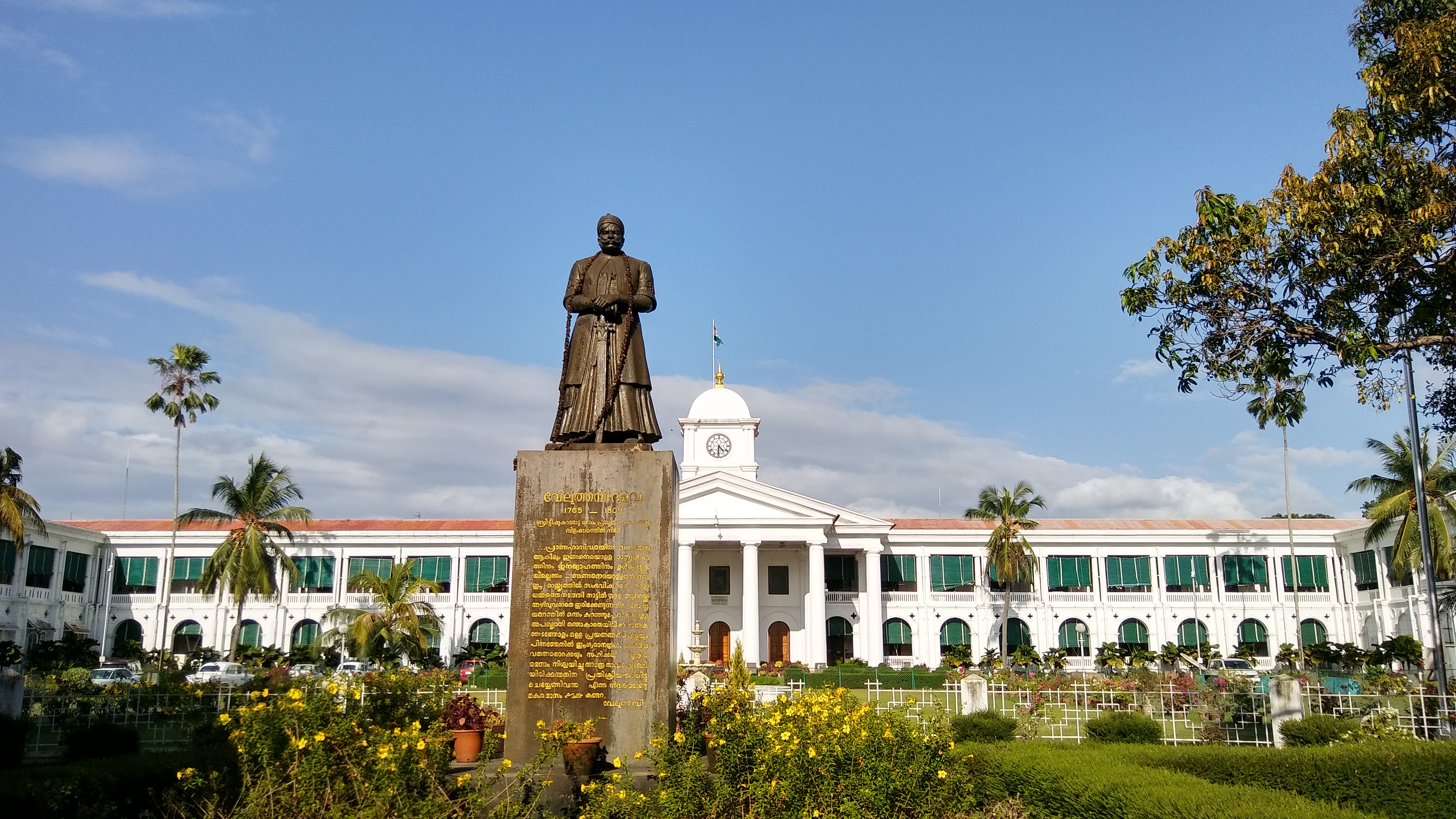
Government Secretariat in Thiruvananthapuram, the seat of executive administration of Kerala

The administration of the state government functions through 50 secretariat departments. Each government department is headed politically by a Minister and administratively by a Secretary to Government, in the rank of additional chief secretary, or principal secretary, or secretary, who is typically an officer of the Indian Administrative Service (IAS). The additional chief secretaries/principal secretaries serve as the administrative heads of the department to which they are assigned. Each department also has officers of the rank of special secretary, additional secretary, joint secretary, deputy secretary, under secretary and other supporting officials. These secretariat departments are responsible for policy formulation and administrative supervision, while line departments and other executive agencies are implementing government policies and programmes at the field level. Each Secretariat department exercises administrative control over one or more line departments, directorates, commissionerates, boards, or similar executive agencies. These agencies are responsible for implementing government policies, regulatory administration, enforcement, delivering public services and carrying out functions at the field level. They are generally headed by a Director, Commissioner, or similar authority, who functions as the Head of Department, depending on the nature of the organisation. Each of these departments/agencies has its own administrative subdivisions.

The state is divided into fourteen districts, each having a collectorate as the headquarters of the district administration. The District Collector is the head of district administration and is responsible for land revenue administration, disaster management, elections, maintenance of law and order, and coordination of various government departments within the district. For administrative convenience, each district is further divided into revenue divisions, taluks, and revenue villages, primarily for the purpose of land revenue administration.

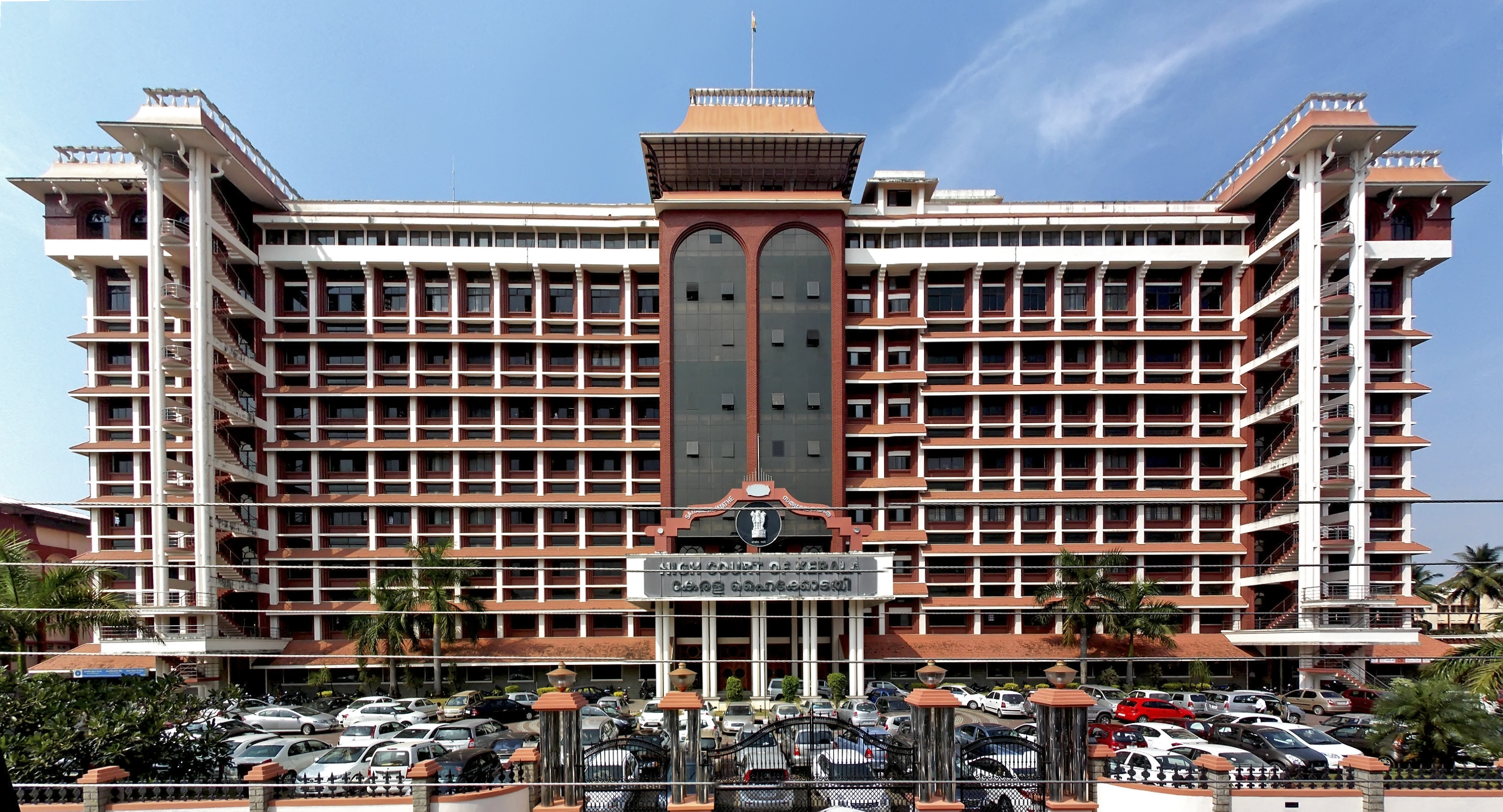
Kerala High Court in Kochi

The judiciary consists of the Kerala High Court and a system of lower courts. The High Court, located in Kochi, has a Chief Justice along with 35 permanent and twelve additional pro tempore justices as of 2021. The high court also hears cases from the Union Territory of Lakshadweep. The state's subordinate judiciary consists of District and Sessions Courts in each of the 14 districts, headed by District Judges, along with civil courts (Munsiff and Senior Civil Judges) and criminal courts (Judicial Magistrates, Chief Judicial Magistrates, and Sessions Courts) handling cases according to their jurisdiction.

Law enforcement in Kerala is primarily carried out by the Kerala Police, which functions under the administrative control of the Home Department of the Government of Kerala. The Kerala Police is headed by the State Police Chief, who holds the rank of Director General of Police (DGP). Kerala Police is structured into two police zones (North and South), which are further divided into ranges, police districts, subdivisions, and police stations. There are 20 police districts, each headed by a District Police Chief (DPC), responsible for policing, law and order, and police administration within the district. There are 484 local police stations, which are responsible for primary law enforcement.

=== Local government ===
In Kerala, local government bodies such as Panchayats, Municipalities, and Corporations have existed since 1959. However, a significant decentralisation initiative began in 1993, aligning with constitutional amendments by the union government. The Kerala Panchayati Raj Act and the Kerala Municipality Act were enacted in 1994, establishing a three-tier system for rural governance and a single-tier system for urban governance.

The rural governance three-tier structure consists of Gram Panchayats, Block Panchayats, and District Panchayats. The Kerala Panchayati Raj Act, 1994 define clear powers for these institutions. For urban areas, the Kerala Municipality Act provides a single-tier system, comprising Municipalities and Municipal Corporations, which are responsible for local governance and civic administration. These bodies are regularly constituted through local body elections. These bodies receive substantial administrative, legal, and financial powers to ensure effective decentralisation. Currently, the state government allocates around 40% of the state plan outlay to local governments. Kerala has 1,200 local bodies, including 941 Gram Panchayats, 152 Block Panchayats, 14 District Panchayats, 87 Municipalities, and 6 Municipal Corporations.

Kerala was declared the first digital state of India in 2016 and, according to the India Corruption Survey 2019 by Transparency International, is considered the least corrupt state in India. The Public Affairs Index-2020 designated Kerala as the best-governed state in India.

=== Politics ===
According to the Constitution of India, Kerala has a parliamentary system of representative democracy; universal suffrage is granted to residents. The state is often regarded as one of the most egalitarian states in India due to its strong social welfare policies, land reforms, and high human development indicators. Kerala's politics is primarily shaped by communism, democratic socialism, secularism, centrism and regional interests. Right-wing politics is a relatively smaller force and is primarily represented by the Bharatiya Janata Party-led National Democratic Alliance (NDA).

Kerala has two major political alliances – the United Democratic Front (UDF), led by the Indian National Congress, and the Left Democratic Front (LDF), led by the Communist Party of India (Marxist) (CPI(M)). Since 1980, Kerala's politics has been dominated by the LDF and UDF, with governments largely alternating between the two alliances. As of the 2026 Kerala Legislative Assembly election, the UDF is the ruling coalition, and the LDF is the official opposition.

== Economy ==
After independence, the state was managed as a social democratic welfare economy. The "Kerala phenomenon" or "Kerala model of development" of very high human development and in comparison low economic development has resulted from a strong service sector. In 2019–20, the economy of Kerala was the 8th-largest in India with ₹8.55 trillion (US$91 billion) in gross state domestic product (GSDP) and a per capita net state domestic product of ₹222,000 (US$2,400). In 2019–20, the tertiary sector contributed around 63% of the state's GSVA, compared to 28% by secondary sector, and 8% by primary sector. In the period between 1960 and 2020, Kerala's economy was gradually shifting from an agrarian economy into a service-based one.

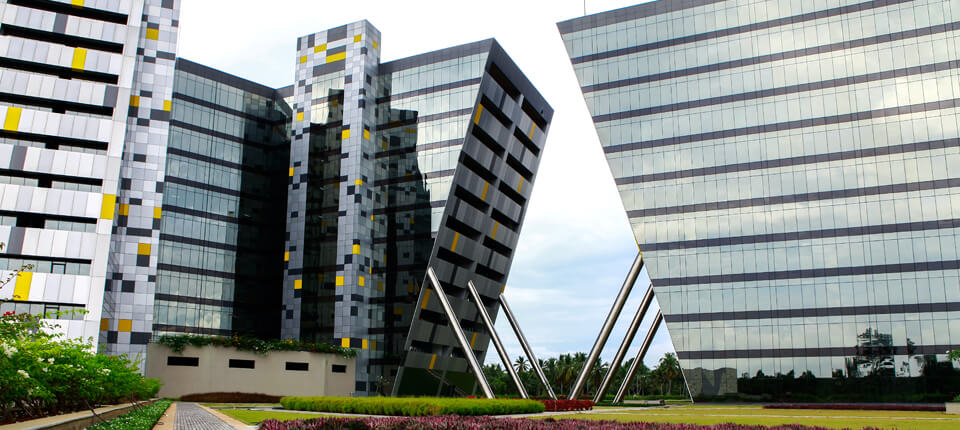
Technopark at Thiruvananthapuram

The state's service sector which accounts for around 63% of its revenue is mainly based upon hospitality industry, tourism, Ayurveda and medical services, pilgrimage, information technology, transportation, financial sector, and education. Major initiatives under the industrial sector include Cochin Shipyard, shipbuilding, oil refinery, software industry, coastal mineral industries, food processing, marine products processing, and Rubber based products. The primary sector of the state is mainly based upon cash crops. Kerala produces a significant amount of the national output of cash crops such as coconut, tea, coffee, pepper, natural rubber, cardamom, and cashew in India. The cultivation of food crops began to reduce since the 1950s.

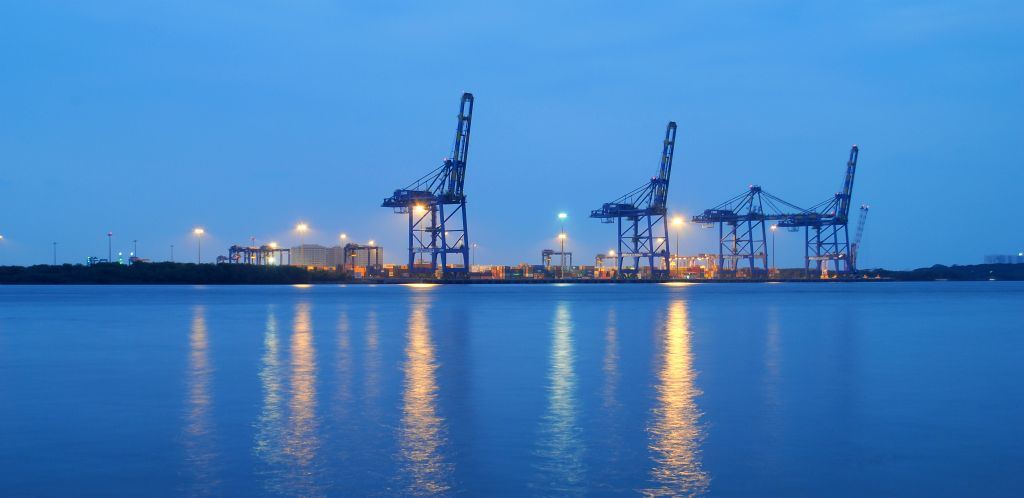
International Container Transshipment Terminal, Kochi

Kerala's economy depends significantly on emigrants working in foreign countries, mainly in the Arab states of the Persian Gulf, and the remittances annually contribute more than a fifth of GSDP. The state witnessed significant emigration during the Gulf Boom of the 1970s and early 1980s. In 2012, Kerala still received the highest remittances of all states: US$11.3 billion, which was nearly 16% of the US$71 billion remittances to the country. In 2015, NRI deposits in Kerala have soared to over ₹1 lakh crore (US$11 billion), amounting to one-sixth of all the money deposited in NRI accounts, which comes to about ₹7 lakh crore (US$75 billion). Malappuram district has the highest proportion of emigrant households in state. A study commissioned by the Kerala State Planning Board, suggested that the state look for other reliable sources of income, instead of relying on remittances to finance its expenditure.

As of March 2002, Kerala's banking sector comprised 3341 local branches: each branch served 10,000 people, lower than the national average of 16,000; the state has the third-highest bank penetration among Indian states. On 1 October 2011, Kerala became the first state in the country to have at least one banking facility in every village. Unemployment in 2007 was estimated at 9.4%; chronic issues are underemployment, low employability of youth, and a low female labour participation rate of only 13.5%, as was the practice of Nokku kooli, "wages for looking on". By 1999–2000, the rural and urban poverty rates dropped to 10.0% and 9.6%, respectively.

The state's budget of 2020–2021 was ₹1.15 lakh crore (US$12 billion). The state government's tax revenues (excluding the shares from Union tax pool) amounted to ₹674 billion (US$7.2 billion) in 2020–21; up from ₹557 billion (US$6.0 billion) in 2019–20. Its non-tax revenues (excluding the shares from Union tax pool) of the Government of Kerala reached ₹146 billion (US$1.6 billion) in 2020–2021. However, Kerala's high ratio of taxation to GSDP has not alleviated chronic budget deficits and unsustainable levels of government debt, which have impacted social services. A record total of 223 hartals were observed in 2006, resulting in a revenue loss of over ₹20 billion (US$210 million). Kerala's 10% rise in GDP is 3% more than the national GDP. In 2013, capital expenditure rose 30% compared to the national average of 5%, owners of two-wheelers rose by 35% compared to the national rate of 15%, and the teacher-pupil ratio rose 50% from 2:100 to 4:100.

The Kerala Infrastructure Investment Fund Board is a government-owned financial institution in the state to mobilise funds for infrastructure development from outside the state revenue, aiming at overall infrastructure development of the state. In November 2015, the Ministry of Urban Development selected seven cities of Kerala for a comprehensive development program known as the Atal Mission for Rejuvenation and Urban Transformation (AMRUT). A package of ₹2.5 million (US$27,000) was declared for each of the cities to develop service level improvement plan (SLIP), a plan for better functioning of the local urban bodies in the cities of Thiruvananthapuram, Kollam, Alappuzha, Kochi, Thrissur, Kozhikode, and Palakkad. The Grand Kerala Shopping Festival (GKSF) was started in 2007, covering more than 3000 outlets across the nine cities of Kerala with huge tax discounts, VAT refunds and huge array of prizes. Lulu International Mall at Thiruvananthapuram is the largest shopping mall in India.

Despite many achievements, Kerala faces many challenges like high levels of unemployment that disproportionately impact educated women, a high degree of global exposure and a very fragile environment.

=== Industries ===
Traditional industries manufacturing items; coir, handlooms, and handicrafts employ around one million people. Kerala supplies 60% of the total global produce of white coir fibre. India's first coir factory was set up in Alleppey in 1859–60. The Central Coir Research Institute was established there in 1959. As per the 2006–2007 census by SIDBI, there are 1,468,104 micro, small and medium enterprises in Kerala employing 3,031,272 people. The KSIDC has promoted more than 650 medium and large manufacturing firms in Kerala, creating employment for 72,500 people. A mining sector of 0.3% of GSDP involves extraction of ilmenite, kaolin, bauxite, silica, quartz, rutile, zircon, and sillimanite. Other major sectors are tourism, medical sector, educational sector, banking, ship building, oil refinery, infrastructure, manufacturing, home gardens, animal husbandry and business process outsourcing.

=== Agriculture ===
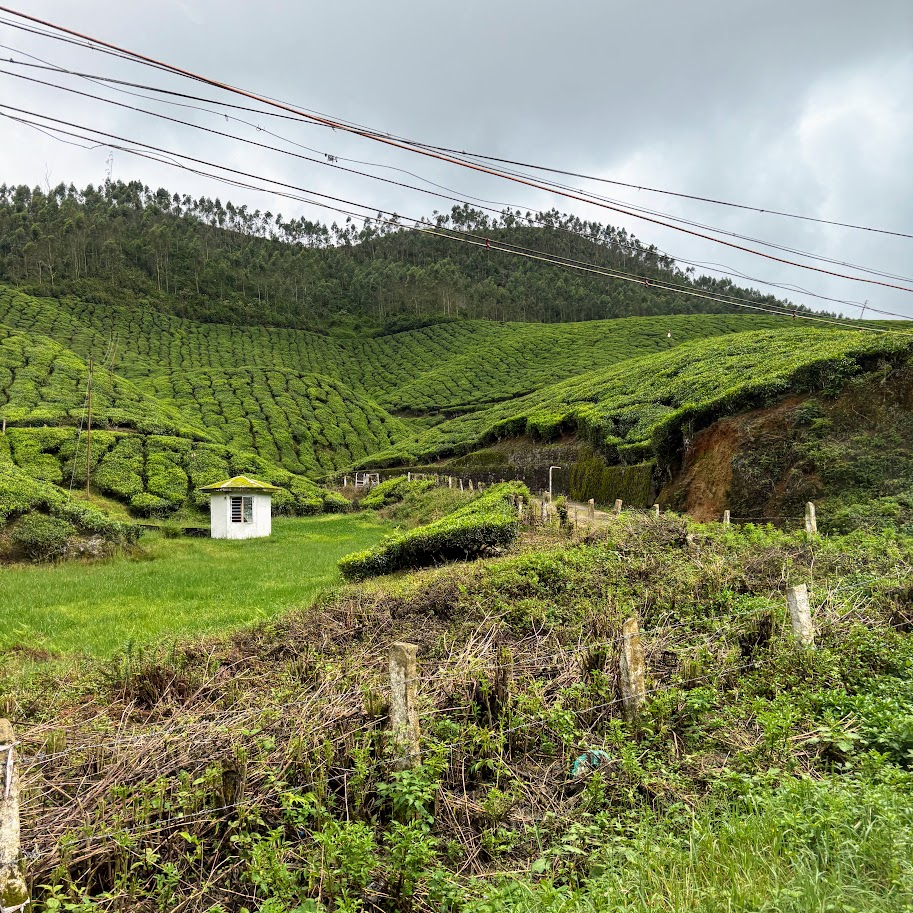
Tea plantations at Munnar, Kerala

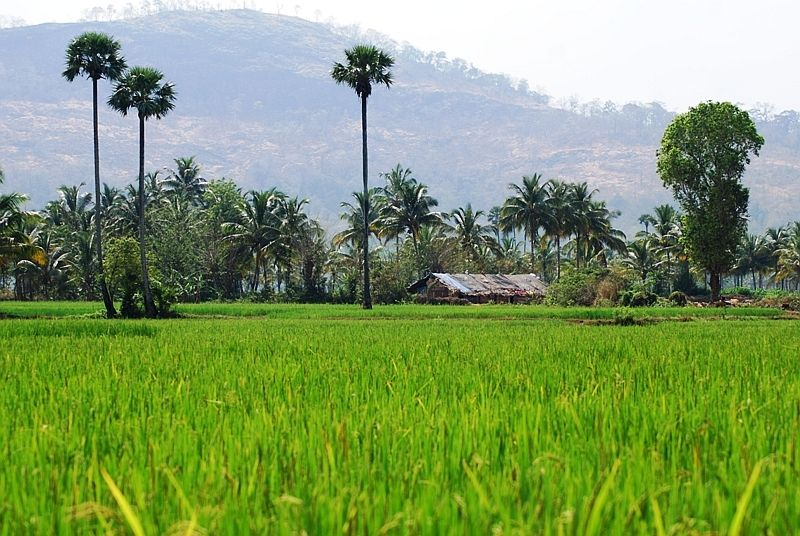
A paddy field at Palakkad, also known as The Granary of Kerala

The major change in agriculture in Kerala occurred in the 1970s when production of rice fell due to increased availability of rice all over India and decreased availability of labour. Consequently, investment in rice production decreased and a major portion of the land shifted to the cultivation of perennial tree crops and seasonal crops. Profitability of crops fell due to a shortage of farm labour, the high price of land, and the uneconomic size of operational holdings. Only 27.3% of the families in Kerala depend upon agriculture for their livelihood, which is also the least corresponding rate in India.

Kerala produces 97% of the national output of black pepper and accounts for 85% of the natural rubber in the country. Coconut, tea, coffee, cashew, and spices—including cardamom, vanilla, cinnamon, and nutmeg are the main agricultural products. Around 80% of India's export quality cashew kernels are prepared in Kollam. The key cash crop is coconut and Kerala ranks first in the area of coconut cultivation in India. Around 90% of the total cardamom produced in India is from Kerala. India is the second-largest producer of cardamom in world. About 20% of the total coffee produced in India are from Kerala. The key agricultural staple is rice, with varieties grown in extensive paddy fields. Home gardens made up a significant portion of the agricultural sector.

=== Fisheries ===
With 590 kilometres (370 miles) of coastal belt, 400,000 hectares of inland water resources and approximately 220,000 active fishermen, Kerala is one of the leading producers of fish in India. According to 2003–04 reports, about 11 lakh(1.1 million) people earn their livelihood from fishing and allied activities such as drying, processing, packaging, exporting and transporting fisheries. The annual yield of the sector was estimated as 6,08,000 tons in 2003–04. This contributes to about 3% of the total economy of the state. In 2006, around 22% of the total Indian marine fishery yield was from Kerala. During the southwest monsoon, a suspended mud bank develops along the shore, which in turn leads to calm ocean water, peaking the output of the fishing industry. This phenomenon is locally called chakara. The waters provide a large variety of fish: pelagic species; 59%, demersal species; 23%, crustaceans, molluscs and others for 18%. Around 1050,000 (1.050 million) fishermen haul an annual catch of 668,000 tonnes as of a 1999–2000 estimate; 222 fishing villages are strung along the 590-kilometre (370-mile) coast. Another 113 fishing villages dot the hinterland.

== Transportation ==
=== Roads ===
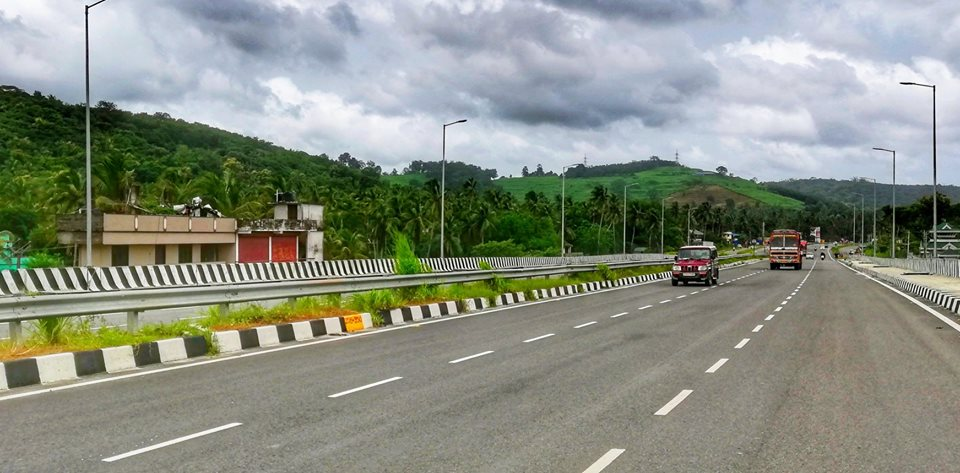
Six lane NH 544 section from Thrissur to Vadakkencherry

Kerala has 331,904 kilometres (206,236 mi) of roads, which accounts for 5.6% of India's total. This translates to about 9.94 kilometres (6.18 mi) of road per thousand people, compared to an average of 4.87 kilometres (3.03 mi) in the country. Roads in Kerala include 1,812 kilometres (1,126 mi) of national highway; 1.6% of the nation's total, 4,342 kilometres (2,698 mi) of state highway; 2.5% of the nation's total, 27,470 kilometres (17,070 mi) of district roads; 4.7% of the nation's total, 33,201 kilometres (20,630 mi) of urban (municipal) roads; 6.3% of the nation's total, and 158,775 kilometres (98,658 mi) of rural roads; 3.8% of the nation's total. Kottayam has the maximum length of roads among the districts of Kerala, while Wayanad accounts for minimum. Most of Kerala's west coast is accessible through the NH 66 (previously NH 17 and 47); and the eastern side is accessible through state highways. New projects for hill and coastal highways were recently announced under KIIFB. National Highway 66, with the longest stretch of road (1,622 kilometres (1,008 mi)) connects Kanyakumari to Mumbai; it enters Kerala via Talapady in Kasargod and passes through Kannur, Kozhikode, Malappuram, Guruvayur, Kochi, Alappuzha, Kollam, Thiruvananthapuram before entering Tamil Nadu. Palakkad district is generally referred to as the Gateway of Kerala, due to the presence of the Palakkad Gap in the Western Ghats, through which the northern (Malabar) and southern (Travancore) parts of Kerala are connected to the rest of India via road and rail. The state's largest checkpoint, Walayar, is on NH 544, in the border town between Kerala and Tamil Nadu, through which a large amount of public and commercial transportation reaches the northern and central districts of Kerala.

The Department of Public Works is responsible for maintaining and expanding the state highways system and major district roads. The Kerala State Transport Project (KSTP), which includes the GIS-based Road Information and Management Project (RIMS), is responsible for maintaining and expanding the state highways in Kerala. It also oversees a few major district roads. Traffic in Kerala has been growing at a rate of 10–11% every year, resulting in high traffic and pressure on the roads. Traffic density is nearly four times the national average, reflecting the state's high population. Kerala's annual total of road accidents is among the nation's highest. The accidents are mainly the result of the narrow roads and irresponsible driving. National Highways in Kerala are among the narrowest in the country and will remain so for the foreseeable future, as the state government has received an exemption that allows narrow national highways. In Kerala, highways are 45 metres (148 feet) wide. In other states, national highways are grade separated, 60 metres (200 feet) wide with a minimum of four lanes, as well as 6 or 8-lane access-controlled expressways. The National Highways Authority of India (NHAI) has threatened the Kerala state government that it will give higher priority to other states in highway development since political commitment to better highways in Kerala has been lacking. As of 2013, Kerala had the highest road accident rate in the country, with most fatal accidents taking place along the state's national highways.

=== Railways ===
Southern Railway zone of Indian Railways operates all railway lines in the state connecting most major towns and cities except those in the highland districts of Idukki and Wayanad. The railway network in the state is controlled by two out of six divisions of the Southern Railway; Thiruvananthapuram Railway division headquartered at Thiruvananthapuram and Palakkad Railway Division headquartered at Palakkad. Thiruvananthapuram Central (TVC) is the busiest railway station in the state. Kerala's major railway stations are:

- Thiruvananthapuram Central (TVC)
- Ernakulam Junction (South) (ERS)
- Kozhikode (CLT)
- Kollam Junction (QLN)
- Thrissur (TCR)
- Palakkad Junction (PGT)
- Kannur (CAN)
- Shoranur Junction (SRR)
- Ernakulam Town (North) (ERN)
- Kottayam (KTYM)
- Chengannur (CNGR)
- Alappuzha (ALLP)
- Thiruvananthapuram North (TVCN)
- Kayamkulam Junction (KYJ)
- Tirur (TIR)
- Kasaragod (KGQ)
- Aluva (AWY)
- Thalassery (TLY)

=== Airports ===
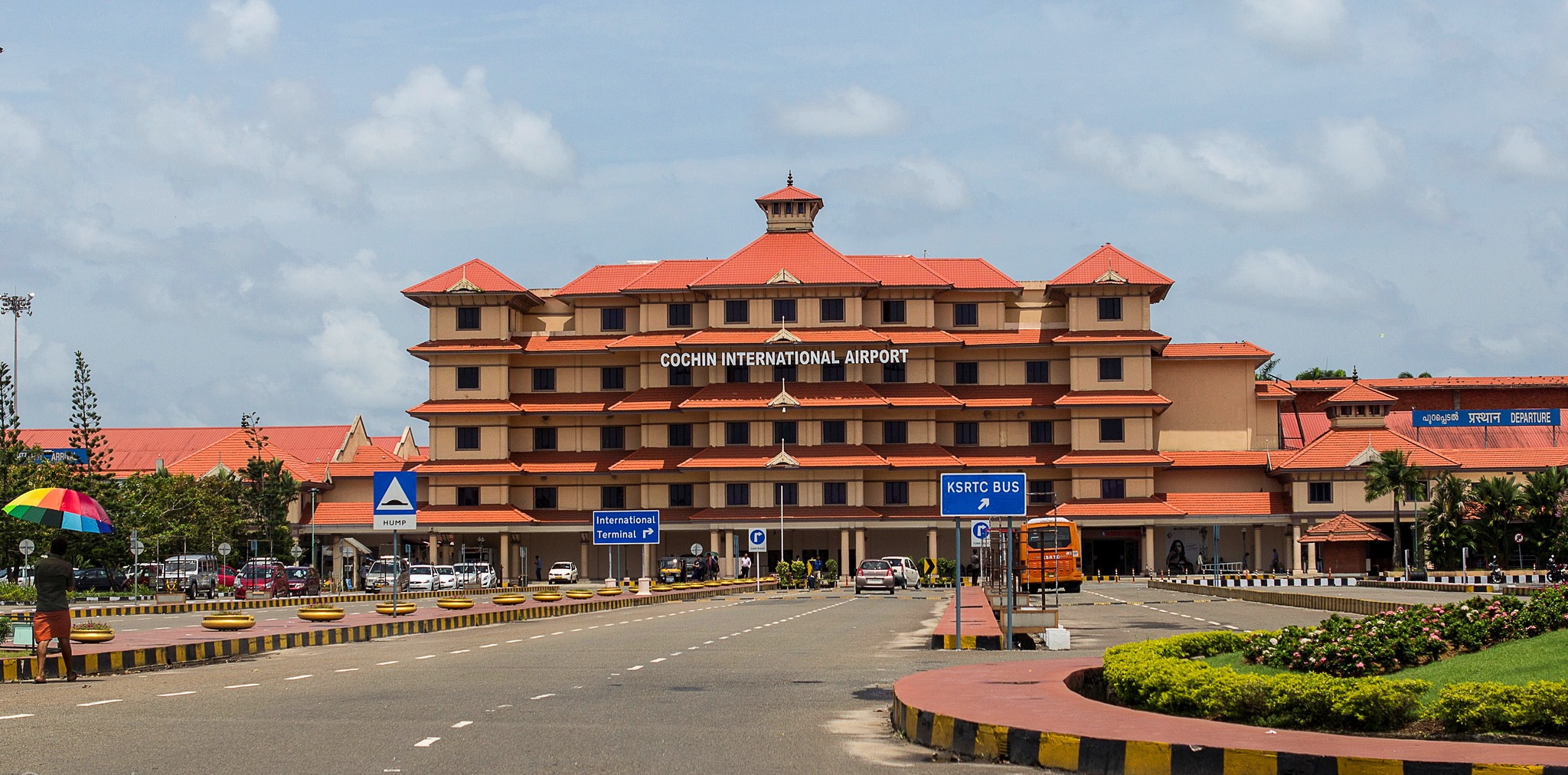
Cochin International Airport, the busiest airport in the state.

Kerala has four international airports–Cochin International Airport, Thiruvananthapuram International Airport, Calicut International Airport, and Kannur International Airport. Kollam Airport, established under the Madras Presidency, but since closed, was the first airport in Kerala. Kannur had an airstrip used for commercial aviation as early as 1935 when Tata airlines operated weekly flights between Mumbai and Thiruvananthapuram – stopping at Goa and Kannur. Trivandrum International Airport, managed by the Airport Authority of India, is among the oldest existing airports in South India. Calicut International Airport, which was opened in 1988, is the second-oldest existing airport in Kerala and the oldest in the Malabar region. Cochin International Airport is the busiest in the state and the seventh busiest in the country. It is also the first airport in the world to be fully powered by solar energy and won the Champions of the Earth award instituted by the United Nations. Cochin International Airport is also the first Indian airport to be incorporated as a public limited company; it was funded by nearly 10,000 non-resident Indians from 30 countries. Other than civilian airports, Kochi has a naval airport named INS Garuda. Thiruvananthapuram Airport shares civilian facilities with the Southern Air Command of the Indian Air Force.

=== Water transport ===
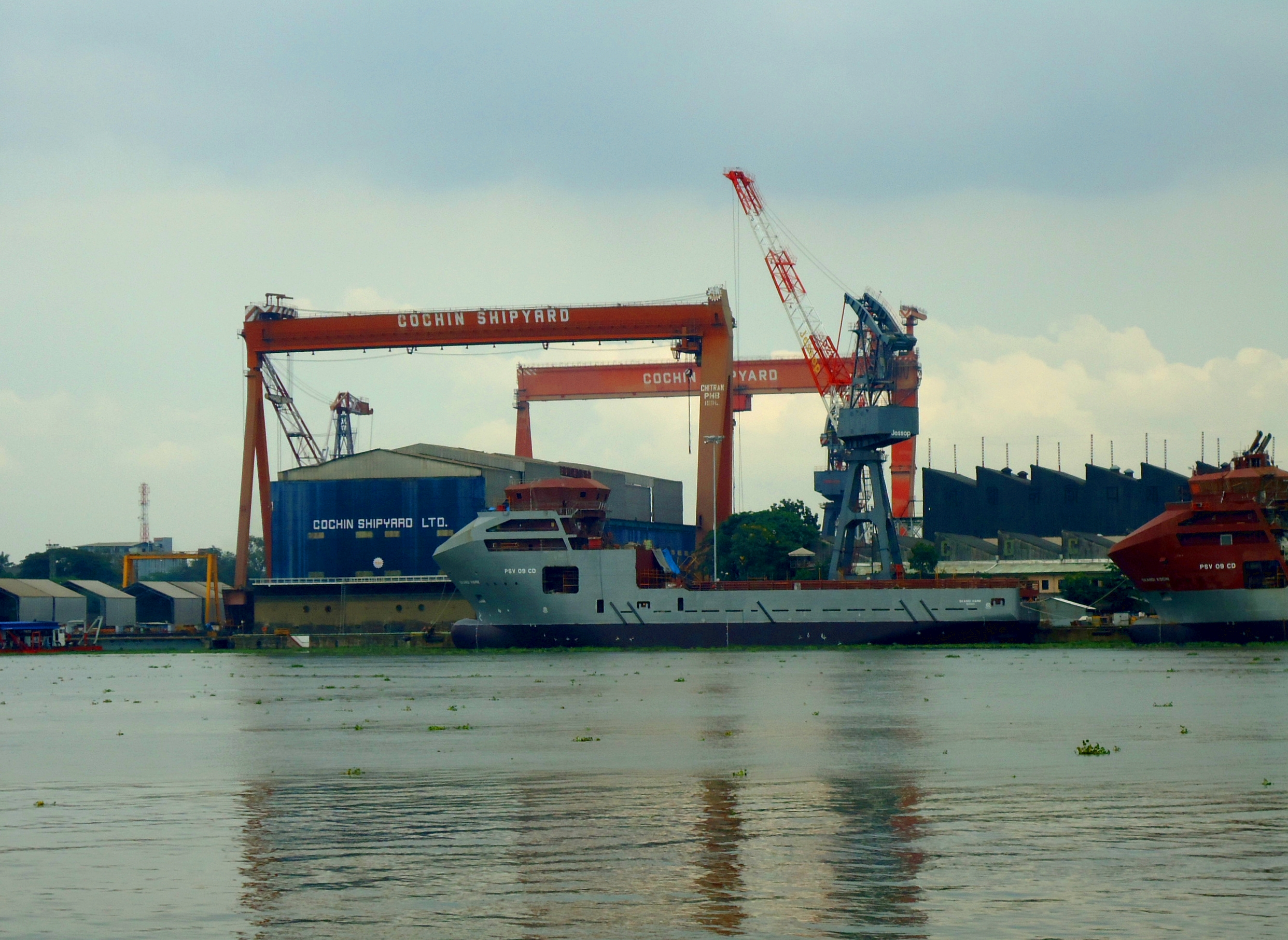
Cochin Shipyard

Kerala has two major ports, four intermediate ports, and 13 minor ports, 4 of which have immigration checkpoint facilities. The major port in the state is at Kochi, which has an area of 8.27 km^{2} (3.19 sq mi). The Vizhinjam International Seaport Thiruvananthapuram, which is currently classified as a major port, only completed Phase I as others are under construction. Other intermediate ports include Beypore, Kollam, and Azheekal. The remaining ports are classified as minor which include Manjeshwaram, Kasaragod, Nileshwaram, Kannur, Thalassery, Vadakara, Ponnani, Munambam, Manakodam, Alappuzha, Kayamkulam, Neendakara, and Valiyathura. The Kerala Maritime Institute is headquartered at Neendakara, which has an additional subcentre at Kodungallur too. The state has numerous backwaters, which are used for commercial inland navigation. Transport services are mainly provided by country craft and passenger vessels. There are 67 navigable rivers in the state while the total length of inland waterways is 1,687 kilometres (1,048 mi). The main constraints to the expansion of inland navigation are; lack of depth in waterways caused by silting, lack of maintenance of navigation systems and bank protection, accelerated growth of the water hyacinth, lack of modern inland craft terminals, and lack of a cargo handling system.

Kerala also have India's first water metro, called 'Kochi water metro'. The Kochi water metro project identified 15 routes, connecting 10 islands along a network of routes that span 78 km with a fleet of 78 fast, and fully electrically propelled hybrid ferries. The 616 kilometres (383 mi) long West-Coast Canal is the longest waterway in state connecting Kasaragod to Poovar. It is divided into five sections: 41 kilometres (25 mi) long Kasaragod-Nileshwaram reach, 188 kilometres (117 mi) long Nileshwaram-Kozhikode reach, 160 kilometres (99 mi) Kozhikode-Kottapuram reach, 168 kilometres (104 mi) long National Waterway 3 (Kottapuram-Kollam reach), and 74 kilometres (46 mi) long Kollam-Vizhinjam reach. The Conolly Canal, which is a part of the West-Coast Canal, connects the city of Kozhikode with Kochi through Ponnani, passing through the districts of Malappuram and Thrissur. It begins at Vadakara. It was constructed in the year 1848 under the orders of then District collector of Malabar, H. V. Conolly, initially to facilitate movement of goods to Kallayi Port from the hinterlands of Malabar through Kuttiady and Korapuzha river systems. It was the main waterway for the cargo movement between Kozhikode and Kochi through Ponnani, for more than a century. Other important waterways in Kerala include the Alappuzha-Changanassery Canal, Alappuzha-Kottayam-Athirampuzha Canal, and Kottayam-Vaikom Canal.

== Demographics ==
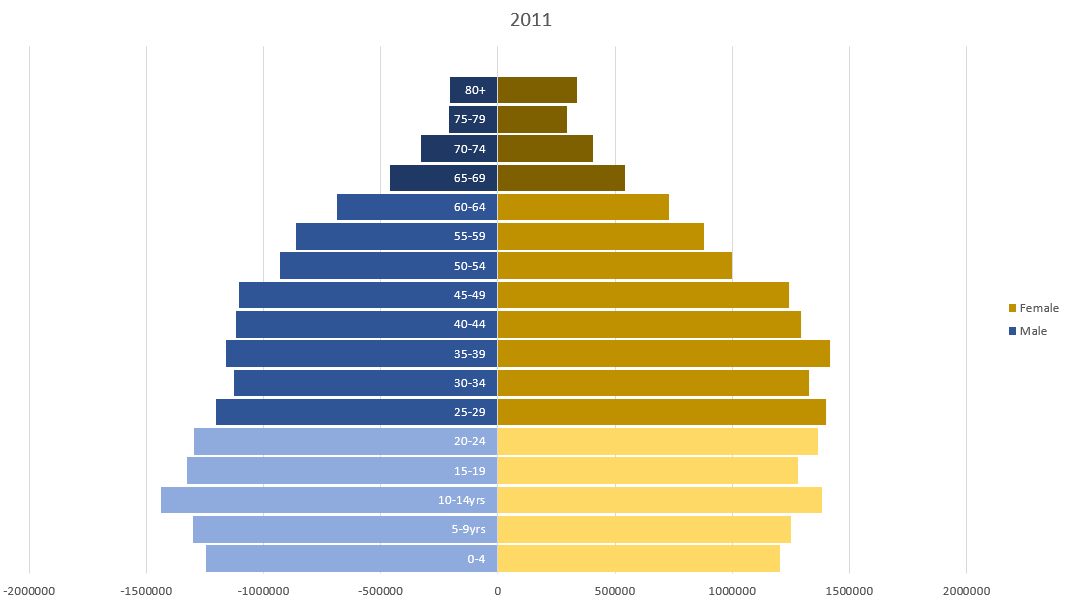
The Population pyramid of Kerala

Kerala is home to 2.8% of India's population; with a density of 859 persons per km^{2}, its land is nearly three times as densely settled as the national average of 370 persons per km^{2}. As of 2011, Thiruvananthapuram is the most populous city in Kerala. In the state, the rate of population growth is India's lowest, and the decadal growth of 4.9% in 2011 is less than one-third of the all-India average of 17.6%. Kerala's population more than doubled between 1951 and 1991 by adding 15.6 million people to reach 29.1 million residents in 1991; the population stood at 33.3 million by 2011. Kerala's coastal regions are the most densely settled with population of 2022 persons per km^{2}, 2.5 times the overall population density of the state, 859 persons per km^{2}, leaving the eastern hills and mountains comparatively sparsely populated. Kerala is the second-most urbanised major state in the country with 47.7% urban population according to the 2011 Census of India. Around 31.8 million Keralites are predominantly Malayali. The state's 321,000 indigenous tribal Adivasis, 1.1% of the population, are concentrated in the east.

=== Gender ===
There is a tradition of matrilineal inheritance in Kerala, where the mother is the head of the household. As a result, women in Kerala have had a much higher standing and influence in the society. This was common among certain influential castes and is a factor in the value placed on daughters. Christian missionaries also influenced Malayali women in that they started schools for girls from poor families. Opportunities for women such as education and gainful employment often translate into a lower birth rate, which in turn, make education and employment more likely to be accessible and more beneficial for women. This creates an upward spiral for both the women and children of the community that is passed on to future generations. According to the Human Development Report of 1996, Kerala's Gender Development Index was 597; higher than any other state of India. Factors, such as high rates of female literacy, education, work participation and life expectancy, along with favourable sex ratio, contributed to it.

Kerala's sex ratio of 1.084 (females to males) is higher than that of the rest of India; it is the only state where women outnumber men. While having the opportunities that education affords them, such as political participation, keeping up to date with current events, reading religious texts, etc., these tools have still not translated into full, equal rights for the women of Kerala. There is a general attitude that women must be restricted for their own benefit. In the state, despite the social progress, gender still influences social mobility.

==== LGBT rights ====
Kerala has been at the forefront of LGBT issues in India. Kerala is one of the first states in India to form a welfare policy for the transgender community. In 2016, the Kerala government introduced free sex reassignment surgery through government hospitals. Queerala is one of the major LGBT organisations in Kerala. It campaigns for increased awareness of LGBT people and sensitisation concerning healthcare services, workplace policies and educational curriculum. Since 2010, Kerala Queer Pride has been held annually across various cities in Kerala.

In June 2019, the Kerala government passed a new order that members of the transgender community should not be referred to as the "third gender" or "other gender" in government communications. Instead, the term "transgender" should be used. Previously, the gender preferences provided in government forms and documents included male, female, and other/third gender.

=== Human Development Index ===
Human Development Index map for Indian states in 2006, as calculated by the Government of India and United Nations Development Programme

Under a democratic communist state government, Kerala has achieved a record of social development much more advanced than the Indian average. As of 2015, Kerala has a Human Development Index (HDI) of 0.770, which is in the "high" category, ranking it first in the country. It was 0.790 in 2007–08 and it had a consumption-based HDI of 0.920, which is better than that of many developed countries. Comparatively higher spending by the government on primary level education, health care and the elimination of poverty from the 19th century onwards has helped the state maintain an exceptionally high HDI; the report was prepared by the central government's Institute of Applied Manpower Research. However, the Human Development Report 2005, prepared by Centre for Development Studies envisages a virtuous phase of inclusive development for the state since the advancement in human development had already started aiding the economic development of the state. Kerala is also widely regarded as the cleanest and healthiest state in India.

According to the 2011 census, Kerala has the highest literacy rate (94%) among Indian states. In 2018, the literacy rate was calculated to be 96.2% in the 2018 literacy survey conducted by the National Statistical Office, India. In the Kottayam district, the literacy rate was 97%. The life expectancy in Kerala is 74 years, among the highest in India as of 2011. Kerala's rural poverty rate fell from 59% (1973–1974) to 12% (1999–2010); the overall (urban and rural) rate fell 47% between the 1970s and 2000s against the 29% fall in overall poverty rate in India. By 1999–2000, the rural and urban poverty rates dropped to 10.0% and 9.6%, respectively. The 2013 Tendulkar Committee Report on poverty estimated that the percentages of the population living below the poverty line in rural and urban Kerala are 9.1% and 5.0%, respectively. These changes stem largely from efforts begun in the late 19th century by the kingdoms of Cochin and Travancore to boost social welfare. This focus was maintained by Kerala's post-independence government. Kerala is the least impoverished state in India according to NITI Aayog's Sustainable Development Goals dashboard and Reserve Bank of India's Handbook of Statistics on Indian Economy.

Kerala has undergone a "demographic transition" characteristic of such developed nations as Canada, Japan, and Norway. In 2005, 11.2% of people were over the age of 60. In 2023, the BBC reported on the problems and benefits which have arisen from migration away from Kerala, focussing on the village of Kumbanad. In 2004, the birthrate was low at 18 per 1,000. According to the 2011 census, Kerala had a total fertility rate (TFR) of 1.6. All districts except Malappuram district had fertility rates below 2. Fertility rate is highest in Malappuram district (2.2) and lowest in Pathanamthitta district (1.3). In 2001, Muslims had the TFR of 2.6 as against 1.5 for Hindus and 1.7 for Christians. The state also is regarded as the "least corrupt Indian state" according to the surveys conducted by CMS Indian Corruption Study (CMS-ICS) Transparency International (2005) and India Today (1997). Kerala has the lowest homicide rate among Indian states, with 1.1 per 100,000 in 2011. In respect of female empowerment, some negative factors such as higher suicide rate, lower share of earned income, child marriage, complaints of sexual harassment and limited freedom are reported. The child marriage is lower in Kerala. The Malappuram district has the highest number of child marriages and the number of such cases is increasing in Malappuram. Child marriages are particularly higher among the Muslim community. In 2019, Kerala recorded the highest child sex abuse complaints in India.

In 2015, Kerala had the highest conviction rate of any state, over 77%. Kerala has the lowest proportion of homeless people in rural India, <0.1%, and the state is attempting to reach the goal of becoming the first "Zero Homeless State", in addition to its acclaimed "Zero landless project", with private organisations and the expatriate Malayali community funding projects for building homes for the homeless. The state was also among the lowest in the India State Hunger Index next only to Punjab. In 2015 Kerala became the first "complete digital state" by implementing e-governance initiatives.

=== Healthcare ===
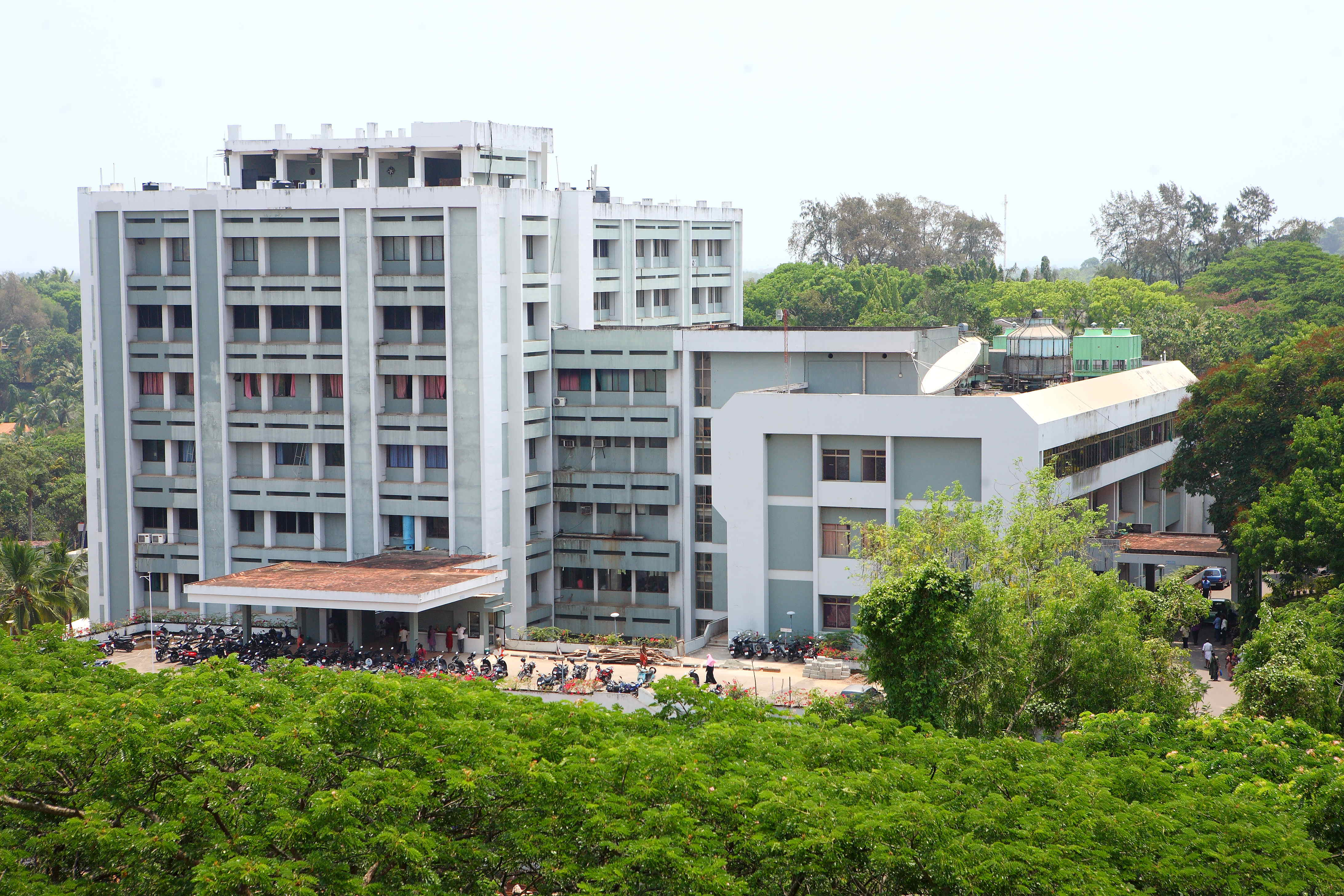
Regional Cancer Centre, Trivandrum

Kerala is a pioneer in implementing the universal health care program. The sub-replacement fertility level and infant mortality rate are lower compared to those of other states, estimated from 12 to 14 deaths per 1,000 live births; as per the National Family Health Survey 2015–16, it has dropped to 6. According to a study commissioned by Lien Foundation, a Singapore-based philanthropic organisation, Kerala is considered to be the best place to die in India based on the state's provision of palliative care for patients with serious illnesses. However, Kerala's morbidity rate is higher than that of any other Indian state—118 (rural) and 88 (urban) per 1,000 people. The corresponding figures for all India were 55 and 54 per 1,000, respectively as of 2005. Kerala's 13.3% prevalence of low birth weight is higher than that of many first world nations. Outbreaks of water-borne diseases such as diarrhoea, dysentery, hepatitis, and typhoid among the more than 50% of people who rely on 3 million water wells is an issue worsened by the lack of sewers. As of 2017, the state has the highest number of diabetes patients and also the highest prevalence rate of the disease in India.

The United Nations Children's Fund (UNICEF) and the World Health Organization designated Kerala the world's first "baby-friendly state" because of its effective promotion of breastfeeding over formulas. Over 95% of Keralite births are hospital-delivered and the state also has the lowest infant mortality rate in the country. The third National Family Health Survey ranks Kerala first in "Institutional Delivery" with 100% of births being in medical facilities. Ayurveda, siddha, and endangered and endemic modes of traditional medicine, including kalari, marmachikitsa and vishavaidyam, are practised. Some occupational communities such as Kaniyar were known as native medicine men in relation to the practice of such streams of medical systems, apart from their traditional vocation. These propagate via gurukula discipleship, and comprise a fusion of both medicinal and alternative treatments. The Arya Vaidya Sala established by Vaidyaratnam P. S. Warrier at Kottakkal (about 10 km from Malappuram) in 1902, is the largest Ayurvedic medicinal network and health centre in the state. It is also one of the largest Ayurvedic medicinal brands in the world.

In 2014, Kerala became the first state in India to offer free cancer treatment to the poor, via a program called Sukrutham. People in Kerala experience elevated incidence of cancers, liver and kidney diseases. In April 2016, the Economic Times reported that 250,000 residents undergo treatment for cancer. It also reported that approximately 150 to 200 liver transplants are conducted in the region's hospitals annually. Approximately 42,000 cancer cases are reported in the region annually. This is believed to be an underestimate as private hospitals may not be reporting their figures. Long waiting lists for kidney donations have stimulated illegal trade in human kidneys, and prompted the establishment of the Kidney Federation of India which aims to support financially disadvantaged patients. As of 2017–18, there are 6,691 modern medicine institutions under the Department of Health Services, of which the total bed strength is 37,843; 15,780 in rural areas and 22,063 in urban.

=== Language ===
Malayalam is the official language of Kerala and one of the Classical languages of India. There is a significant Tamil-speaking population in Idukki district and Palakkad district, which accounts for 17.48% and 4.8% respectively of the two districts' populations. Tulu and Kannada are spoken mainly in the northern parts of Kasaragod district, each of which account for 8.77% and 4.23% of total population in the district, respectively.

=== Religion ===
Religion in Kerala (2011)
1. Hinduism (54.7%)
2. Islam (26.6%)
3. Christianity (18.4%)
4. Other or none (0.32%)

Kerala is very religiously diverse with Hindus, Muslims and Christians having a significant population throughout the state. Kerala is often regarded as one of the most diverse states in all of India. Hinduism is the most widely professed faith in Kerala, with significant numbers of adherents to Islam and Christianity. In comparison with the rest of India, Kerala experiences relatively little sectarianism. According to 2011 Census of India figures, 54.7% of Kerala's residents are Hindus, 26.6% are Muslims, 18.4% are Christians, and the remaining 0.3% follow another religion or have no religious affiliation. Hindus represent the biggest religious group in all districts except Malappuram, where they are outnumbered by Muslims. Kerala has the largest population of Christians in India. As of 2016, Hindus, Muslims, Christians and others account for 41.9%, 42.6%, 15.4% and 0.2% of the total childbirths in the state, respectively.

Islam arrived in Kerala, a part of the larger Indian Ocean rim, via spice and silk traders from the Middle East. Historians do not rule out the possibility of Islam being introduced to Kerala as early as the seventh century CE. Notable has been the occurrence of Cheraman Perumal Tajuddin, the mythical Hindu king who moved to Arabia to meet Muhammad and converted to Islam. Kerala Muslims are generally referred to as the Mappilas. Mappilas are but one among the many communities that form the Muslim population of Kerala. According to the Legend of Cheraman Perumals, the first Indian mosque was built in 624 CE at Kodungallur with the mandate of the last the ruler (the Cheraman Perumal) of Chera dynasty, who converted to Islam during the lifetime of Muhammad (c. 570–632).

Ancient Christian tradition says that Christianity reached the shores of Kerala in 52 CE with the arrival of Thomas the Apostle, one of the Twelve Apostles of Jesus Christ. Saint Thomas Christians include Syro-Malabar Catholic, Syro-Malankara Catholic, Jacobite Syrian Christian Church, Mar Thoma Syrian Church, Malankara Orthodox Syrian Church, the Syrian Anglicans of the CSI and Pentecostal Saint Thomas Christians. The origin of the Latin Catholic Christians in Kerala is the result of the missionary endeavours of the Portuguese Padroado in the 16th century. As a consequence of centuries of mixing with colonial immigrants, beginning with the Portuguese, Dutch, French, British and other Europeans, there is a community of Anglo-Indians in Kerala of mixed European and Indian parentage or ancestry. Kerala has the highest population of Christians among all the states of India.

Judaism reached Kerala in the 10th century BCE during the time of King Solomon. They are called Cochin Jews or Malabar Jews and are the oldest group of Jews in India. There was a significant Jewish community which existed in Kerala until the 20th century, when most of them migrated to Israel. The Paradesi Synagogue at Kochi is the oldest synagogue in the Commonwealth. Jainism has a considerable following in the Wayanad district.

== Education ==
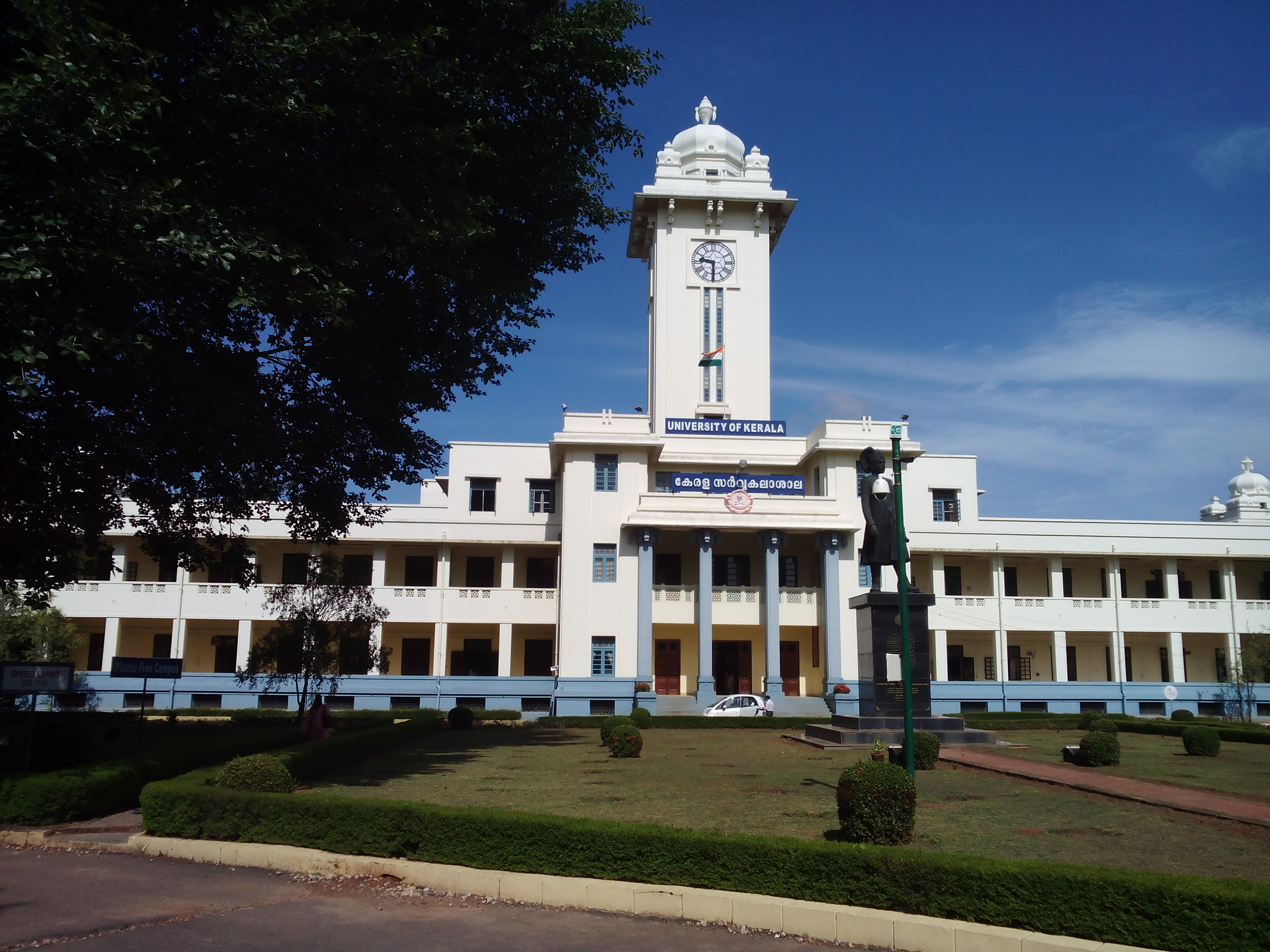
University of Kerala at Thiruvananthapuram

The Kerala school of astronomy and mathematics flourished between the 14th and 16th centuries. In attempting to solve astronomical problems, the Kerala school independently created a number of important mathematics concepts, including series expansion for trigonometric functions. In the early decades of the 19th century, the modern educational transformation of Kerala was triggered by the efforts of the Church Mission Society missionaries to promote mass education. Following the recommendations of the Wood's despatch of 1854, the princely states of Travancore and Cochin launched mass education drives mainly based on castes and communities, and introduced a system of grant-in-aid to attract more private initiatives. Catholic institutions such as St Thomas College Thrissur and SB College Changanasserry were established under the leadership of the Catholic Church. The efforts by leaders such as Fr. Kuriakose Elias Chavara, Mar Charles Lavigne SJ, Vaikunda Swami, Narayana Guru and Ayyankali in aiding the socially discriminated castes in the state—with the help of community-based organisations like Nair Service Society, SNDP, Muslim Educational Society, Muslim Mahajana Sabha, Yoga Kshema Sabha (of Nambudiris) and congregations of Christian churches—led to the further development of mass education in Kerala.

In 1991, Kerala became the first state in India to be recognised as completely literate, although the effective literacy rate at that time was only 90%. In 2006–2007, the state topped the Education Development Index (EDI) of the 21 major states in India. As of 2007, enrolment in elementary education was almost 100%; and, unlike other states in India, educational opportunity was almost equally distributed among sexes, social groups, and regions. According to the 2011 census, Kerala has a 93.9% literacy, compared to the national literacy rate of 74.0%. In January 2016, Kerala became the first Indian state to achieve 100% primary education through its Athulyam literacy programme.

The educational system prevailing in the state's schools specifies an initial 10-year course of study, which is divided into three stages: lower primary, upper primary, and secondary school—known as 4+3+3, which signifies the number of years for each stage. After the first 10 years of schooling, students typically enroll in Higher Secondary Schooling in one of the three major streams—liberal arts, commerce, or science. The majority of public schools are affiliated with the Kerala Board of Public Examination. Other educational boards are the Indian Certificate of Secondary Education (ICSE), the Central Board for Secondary Education (CBSE), and the National Institute of Open Schooling (NIOS).

== Culture ==
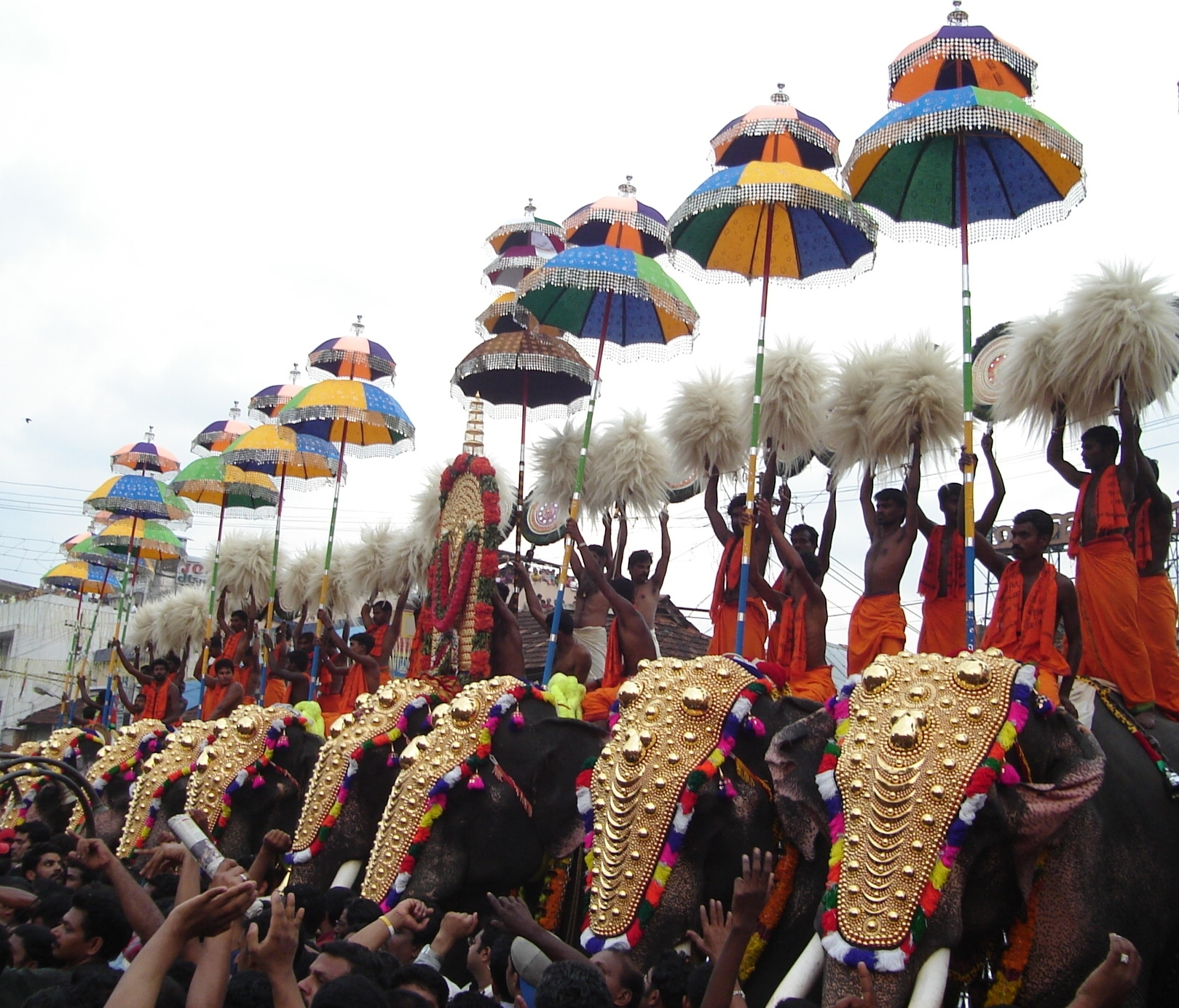
Thrissur Pooram festival

The culture of Kerala is composite and cosmopolitan in nature and it is an integral part of Indian culture. It is a synthesis of Aryan, Dravidian, Arab, and European cultures, developed over millennia, under influences from other parts of India and abroad. It is defined by its antiquity and the organic continuity sustained by the Malayali people. It was elaborated through centuries of contact with neighbouring and overseas cultures. However, the geographical insularity of Kerala from the rest of the country has resulted in the development of a distinctive lifestyle, art, architecture, language, literature and social institutions. Over 10,000 festivals are celebrated in the state every year. The Malayalam calendar, a solar sidereal calendar started from 825 CE in Kerala, finds common usage in planning agricultural and religious activities. Malayalam, one of the classical languages in India, is Kerala's official language. Over a dozen other scheduled and unscheduled languages are also spoken. Kerala has the greatest consumption of alcohol in India.

=== Festivals ===
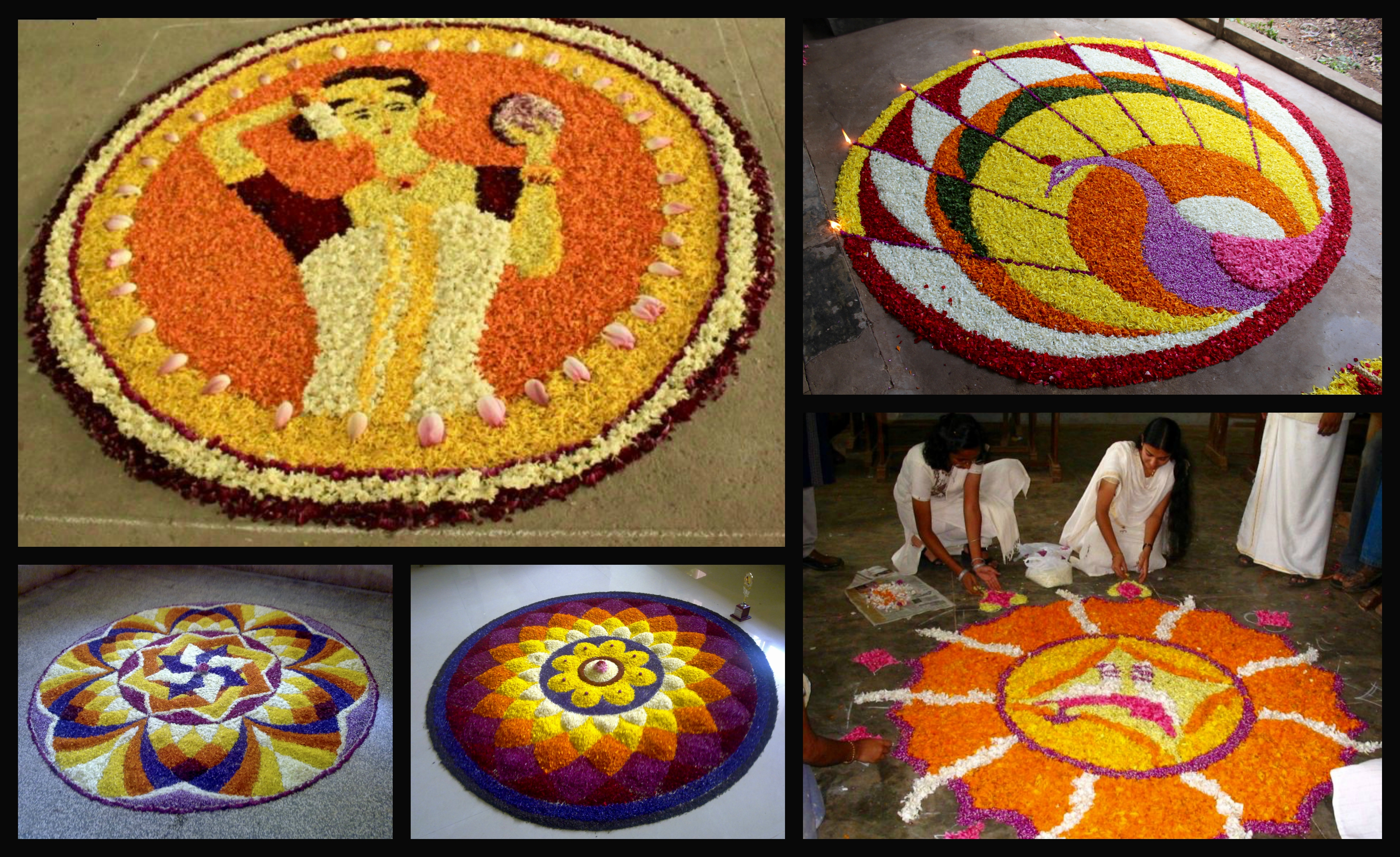
During Onam, Keralites create "pookkalam" (floral carpet) designs in front of their houses.

Many of the temples in Kerala hold festivals on specific days of the year. A common characteristic of these festivals is the hoisting of a holy flag which is brought down on the final day of the festival after immersing the deity. Some festivals include Poorams, the best known of these being the Thrissur Pooram. "Elephants, firework displays and huge crowds" are the major attractions of Thrissur Pooram. Other known festivals are Makaravilakku, Chinakkathoor Pooram, Attukal Pongala and Nenmara Vallangi Vela Other than these, festivals locally known as utsavams are conducted by many temples mostly on annual basis. Temples that can afford it will usually involve at least one richly caparisoned elephant as part of the festivities. The idol in the temple is taken out on a procession around the countryside atop this elephant. When the procession visits homes around the temple, people will usually present rice, coconuts, and other offerings to it. Processions often include traditional music such as Panchari melam or Panchavadyam. Eid al-Fitr and Eid al-Adha are celebrated by the Muslim community of the state while the festivals like Christmas and Easter are observed by the Christians. Onam is a harvest festival celebrated by the people of Kerala and is reminiscent of the state's agrarian past. It is a local festival of Kerala consisting of a four-day public holidays; from Onam Eve (Uthradam) to the fourth Onam Day. Onam falls in the Malayalam month of Chingam (August–September) and marks the commemoration of the homecoming of King Mahabali. The total duration of Onam is 10 days and it is celebrated all across Kerala. It is one of the festivals celebrated with cultural elements such as Vallam Kali, Pulikali, Pookkalam, Thumbi Thullal and Onavillu.

=== Music and dance ===
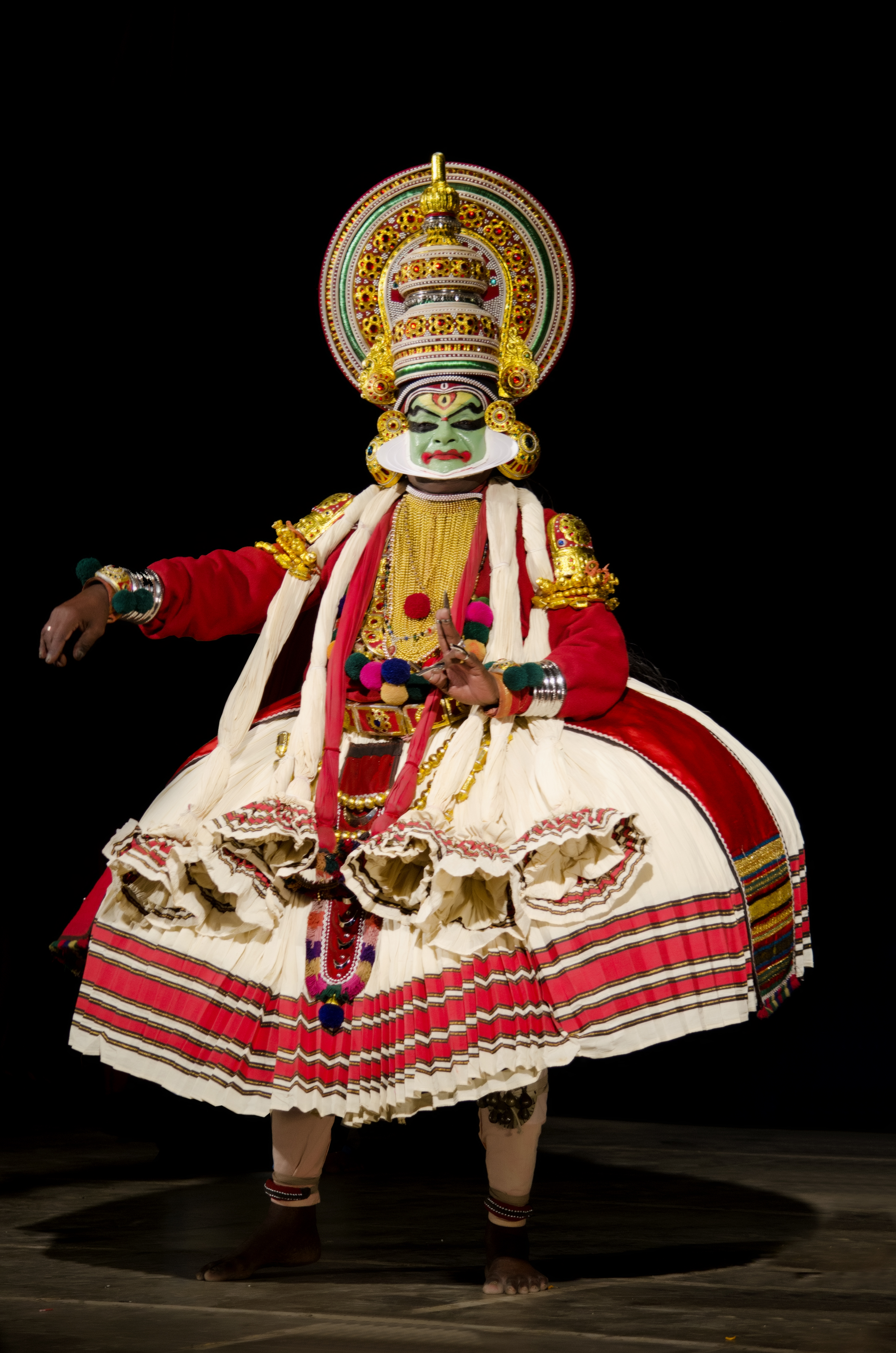
Kathakali performer

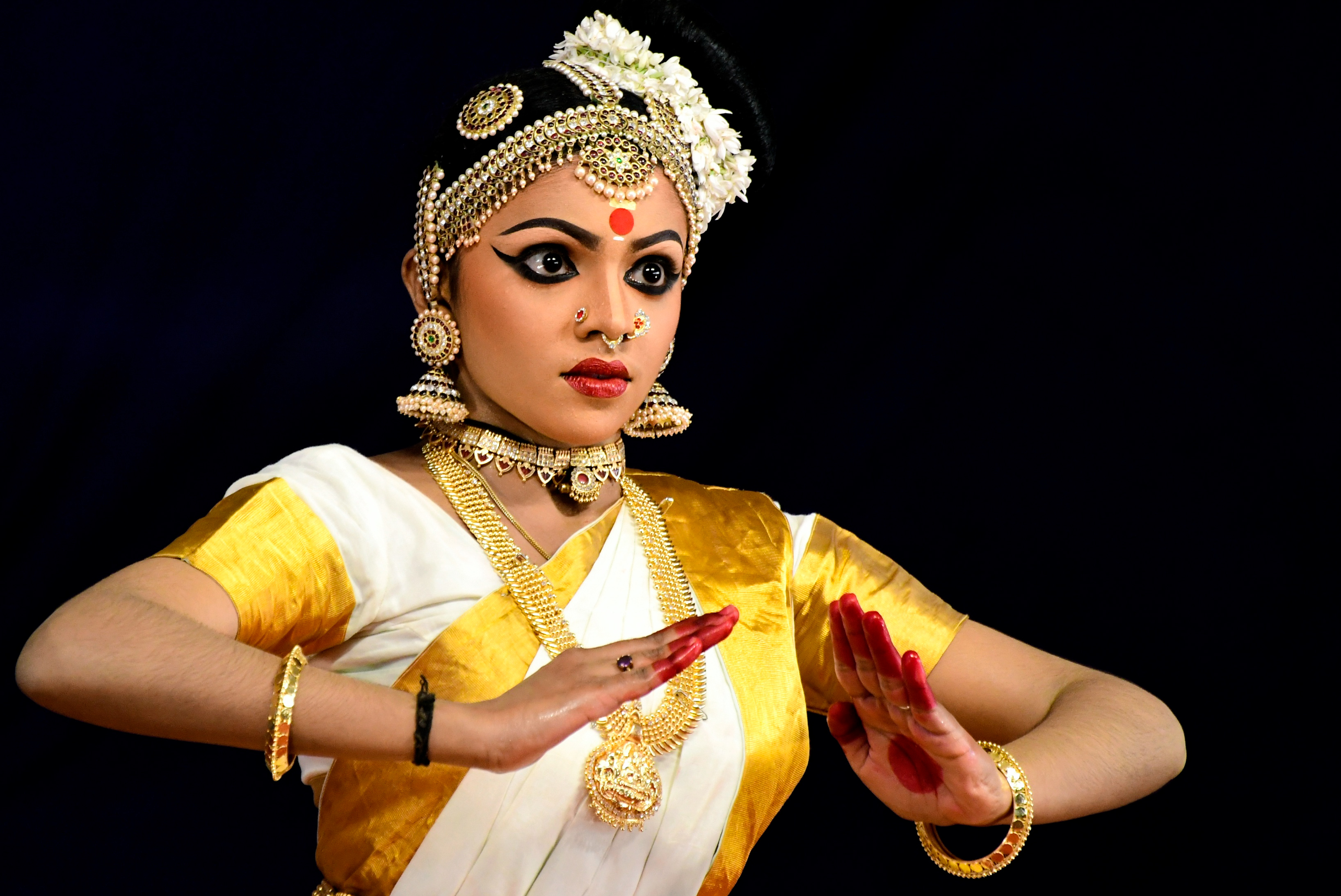
Mohiniattam performance

Kerala is home to a number of performance arts. These include five classical dance forms: Kathakali, Mohiniyattam, Koodiyattom, Thullal and Krishnanattam, which originated and developed in the temple theatres during the classical period under the patronage of royal houses. Kerala natanam, Thirayattam, Kaliyattam, Theyyam, Koothu and Padayani are other dance forms associated with the temple culture of the region. Some traditional dance forms such as Oppana and Duffmuttu were popular among the Muslims of the state, while Margamkali and Parichamuttukali are popular among the Syrian Christians and Chavittu nadakom is popular among the Latin Christians.

The development of classical music in Kerala is attributed to the contributions it received from the traditional performance arts associated with the temple culture of Kerala. The development of the indigenous classical music form, Sopana Sangeetham, illustrates the rich contribution that temple culture has made to the arts of Kerala. Carnatic music dominates Keralite traditional music. This was the result of Swathi Thirunal Rama Varma's popularisation of the genre in the 19th century. Raga-based renditions known as sopanam accompany kathakali performances. Melam, including the paandi and panchari variants, is a more percussive style of music; it is performed at Kshetram-centered festivals using the chenda. Panchavadyam is a form of percussion ensemble, in which artists use five types of percussion instruments. Kerala's visual arts range from traditional murals to the works of Raja Ravi Varma, the state's most renowned painter. Most of the castes and communities in Kerala have rich collections of folk songs and ballads associated with a variety of themes; Vadakkan Pattukal (Northern Ballads), Thekkan pattukal (Southern Ballads), Vanchi pattukal (Boat Songs), Mappila Pattukal (Muslim songs) and Pallipattukal (Church songs) are a few of them.

=== Cinema ===
Malayalam films carved a niche for themselves in the Indian film industry with the presentation of social themes. Directors from Kerala, like Adoor Gopalakrishnan, Mankada Ravi Varma, G. Aravindan, Bharathan, P. Padmarajan, M.T. Vasudevan Nair, K.G. George, Priyadarshan, John Abraham, Ramu Karyat, K S Sethumadhavan, A. Vincent and Shaji N Karun have made a considerable contribution to the Indian parallel cinema. Kerala has also given birth to numerous actors, such as Mohanlal, Mammootty, Satyan, Prem Nazir, Madhu, Sheela, Sharada, Miss Kumari, Jayan, Adoor Bhasi, Seema, Bharath Gopi, Thilakan, Vijaya Raghavan, Kalabhavan Mani, Indrans, Shobana, Nivin Pauly, Sreenivasan, Urvashi, Manju Warrier, Suresh Gopi, Jayaram, Murali, Shankaradi, Kavya Madhavan, Bhavana Menon, Prithviraj, Parvathy, Jayasurya, Dulquer Salmaan, Oduvil Unnikrishnan, Jagathy Sreekumar, Nedumudi Venu, KPAC Lalitha, Innocent and Fahadh Faasil. Late Malayalam actor Prem Nazir holds the world record for having acted as the protagonist of over 720 movies. Since the 1980s, actors Mohanlal and Mammootty have dominated the movie industry; Mohanlal has won five National Film Awards (four for acting), while Mammootty has three National Film Awards for acting. Malayalam Cinema has produced a few more notable personalities such as K. J. Yesudas, K.S. Chitra, M.G. Sreekumar, Vayalar Rama Varma, V. Madhusoodanan Nair, M.T. Vasudevan Nair and O.N.V. Kurup, the last two mentioned being recipients of Jnanpith award, the highest literary award in India. Resul Pookutty, who is from Kerala, is the only Indian to win an Academy Award for Best Sound Mixing, for the breakthrough film Slumdog Millionaire. As of 2018, Malayalam cinema has got 14 awards for the best actor, 6 for the best actress, 11 for the best film, and 13 for the best film director in the National Film Awards, India.

=== Literature ===
The Sangam literature can be considered as the ancient predecessor of Malayalam. Malayalam literature starts from the Old Malayalam period (9th–13th century CE) and includes such notable writers as the 14th-century Niranam poets (Madhava Panikkar, Sankara Panikkar and Rama Panikkar), and the 16th-century poet Thunchaththu Ezhuthachan, whose works mark the dawn of both the modern Malayalam language and its poetry. For the first 600 years of Malayalam calendar, the literature mainly consisted of the oral Ballads such as Vadakkan Pattukal in North Malabar and Thekkan Pattukal in Southern Travancore. Designated a "Classical Language in India" in 2013, it developed into the current form mainly by the influence of the poets Cherusseri Namboothiri, Thunchaththu Ezhuthachan, and Poonthanam Nambudiri, in the 15th and the 16th centuries of Common Era. Unnayi Variyar, a probable poet of the 17th/18th century CE, and Kunchan Nambiar, a poet of the 18th century CE, have also influenced a lot in the growth of modern Malayalam literature in its pre-mature form. The Bharathappuzha river, also known as River Ponnani, and its tributaries, have played a major role in the development of modern Malayalam Literature.

Paremmakkal Thoma Kathanar and Kerala Varma Valiakoi Thampuran are noted for their contribution to Malayalam prose. The "triumvirate of poets" (Kavithrayam): Kumaran Asan, Vallathol Narayana Menon, and Ulloor S. Parameswara Iyer, are recognised for moving Keralite poetry away from archaic sophistry and metaphysics, and towards a more lyrical mode. The poets like Moyinkutty Vaidyar and Pulikkottil Hyder have made notable contributions to the Mappila songs, which is a genre of the Arabi Malayalam literature. The first travelogue in any Indian language is the Malayalam Varthamanappusthakam, written by Paremmakkal Thoma Kathanar in 1785. The prose literature, Malayalam journalism, and criticism began after the latter-half of the 18th century. Contemporary Malayalam literature deals with social, political, and economic life context. The tendency of the modern literature is often towards political radicalism. Malayalam literature has been presented with 6 Jnanapith awards, the second-most for any Dravidian language and the third-highest for any Indian language. In the second half of the 20th century, Jnanpith winning poets and writers like G. Sankara Kurup, S. K. Pottekkatt, Thakazhi Sivasankara Pillai, M. T. Vasudevan Nair, O. N. V. Kurup, and Akkitham Achuthan Namboothiri, had made valuable contributions to the modern Malayalam literature. Later, writers like O. V. Vijayan, Kamaladas, M. Mukundan, Arundhati Roy, Vaikom Muhammed Basheer, have gained international recognition.

=== Cuisine ===
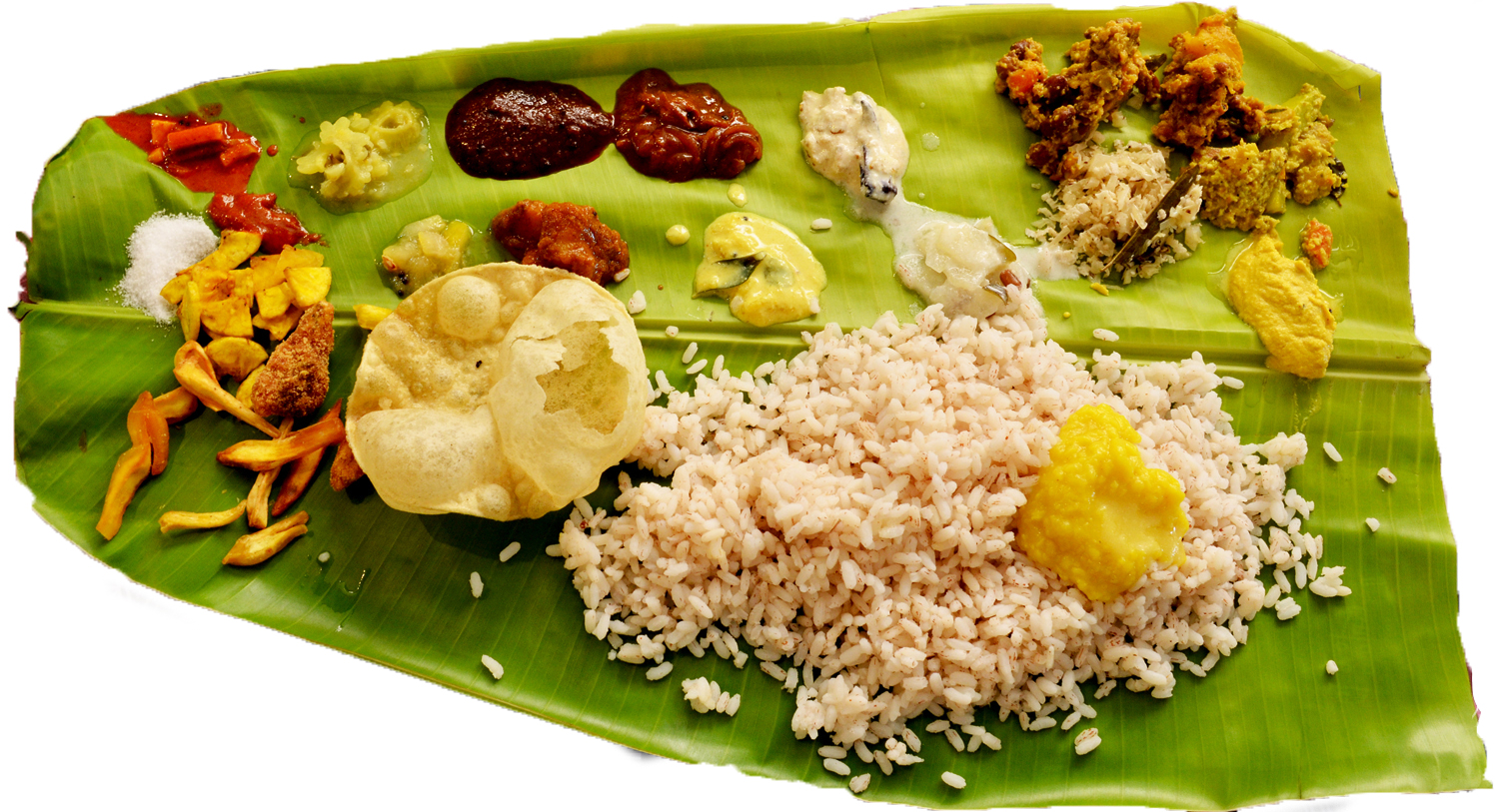
Onam Sadya

Kerala cuisine includes a wide variety of vegetarian and non-vegetarian dishes prepared using fish, poultry, and meat. Culinary spices have been cultivated in Kerala for millennia and they are characteristic of its cuisine. Rice is a dominant staple that is eaten at all times of day. A majority of the breakfast foods in Kerala are made out of rice, in one form or the other (idli, dosa, puttu, pathiri, appam, or idiyappam), tapioca preparations, or pulse-based vada. These may be accompanied by chutney, kadala, payasam, payar pappadam, appam, chicken curry, beef fry, egg masala and fish curry. Porotta and Biryani are also often found in restaurants in Kerala. Thalassery biryani is popular as an ethnic brand. Lunch dishes include rice and curry along with rasam, pulisherry and sambar. Sadhya is a vegetarian meal, which is served on a banana leaf and followed with a cup of payasam. Popular snacks include banana chips, yam crisps, tapioca chips, Achappam, Unni appam and kuzhalappam. Seafood specialties include karimeen, prawns, shrimp and other crustacean dishes. Thalassery Cuisine is varied and is a blend of many influences.

== Media ==
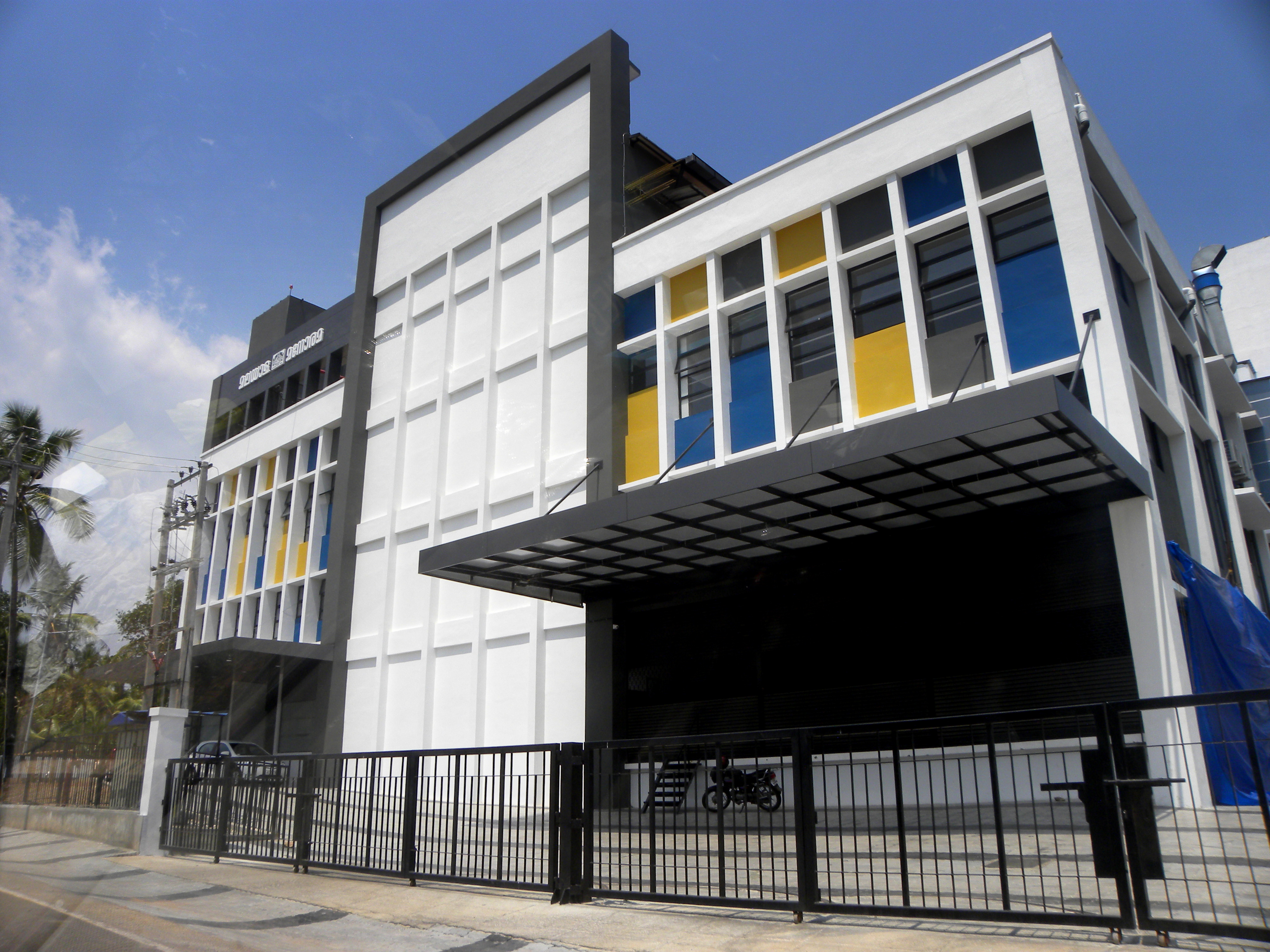
Malayala Manorama office in Kollam

The media, telecommunications, broadcasting and cable services are regulated by the Telecom Regulatory Authority of India (TRAI). The National Family Health Survey – 4, conducted in 2015–16, ranked Kerala as the state with the highest media exposure in India. Dozens of newspapers are published in Kerala, in nine major languages, but principally Malayalam and English. Kerala has the highest media exposure in India. The most widely circulated Malayalam-language newspapers are Malayala Manorama, Mathrubhumi, Deshabhimani, Madhyamam, Kerala Kaumudi, Mangalam, Chandrika, Deepika, Janayugam, Janmabhumi, Siraj Daily and Suprabhaatham. Major Malayalam periodicals include Mathrubhumi Azhchappathippu, Vanitha, India Today Malayalam, Madhyamam Weekly, Grihalakshmi, Dhanam, Chithrabhumi and Bhashaposhini.

DD Malayalam is a state-owned television broadcaster. Multiple-system operators provide a mix of Malayalam, English, other Indian languages, and international channels. Some of the popular Malayalam television channels are Asianet, Asianet News, Asianet Plus, Asianet Movies, Surya TV, Surya Movies, Mazhavil Manorama, Manorama News, Kairali TV, Kairali News, Flowers, Media One TV, Mathrubhumi News, Kappa TV, Amrita TV, Reporter TV, Jaihind, Janam TV, Jeevan TV, Kaumudy TV and Shalom TV. With the second-highest internet penetration rate in India, Digital media including social media and OTT services are a main source of information and entertainment in the state. A sizeable people's science movement has taken root in the state, and activities like writer's cooperatives are becoming increasingly common. BSNL, Airtel, Vodafone Idea Limited, Jio are the major cell phone service providers. Broadband Internet services are widely available throughout the state; some of the major Internet service providers are BSNL, Asianet Satellite Communications, Airtel, Vodafone Idea Limited, RailWire, and Tata Communications.

== Sports ==
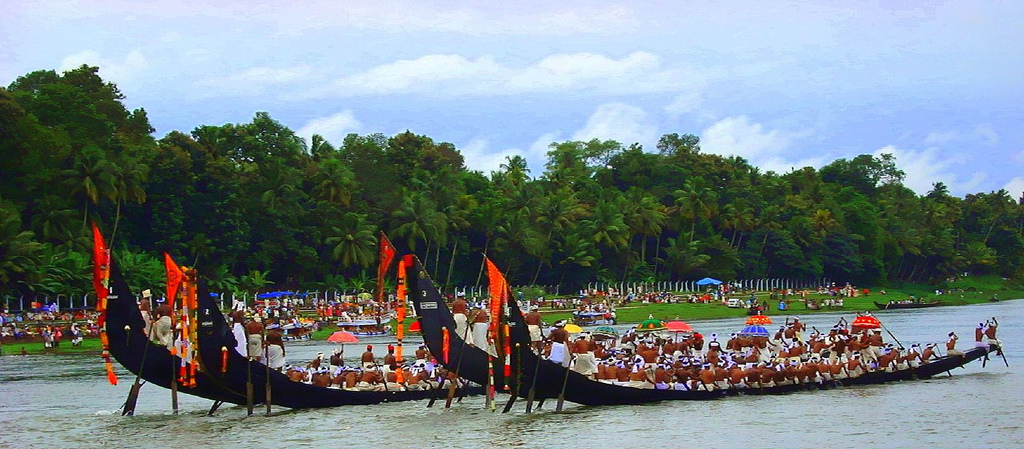
The annual snake boat race is performed during Onam on the Pamba River

By the 21st century, almost all of the native sports and games from Kerala had either disappeared or become just an art form performed during local festivals; including Poorakkali, Padayani, Thalappandukali, Onathallu, Parichamuttukali, Velakali, and Kilithattukali. However, Kalaripayattu, regarded as "the mother of all martial arts in the world", is an exception and is practised as the indigenous martial sport. Another traditional sport of Kerala is the boat race, especially the race of snake boats.

Cricket and football became popular in the state; both were introduced in Malabar during the British colonial period in the 19th century. Cricketers, like Tinu Yohannan, Abey Kuruvilla, Chundangapoyil Rizwan, Sreesanth, Sanju Samson and Basil Thampi found places in the national cricket team. A cricket franchise from Kerala, the Kochi Tuskers, played in the Indian Premier League's fourth season. However, this team was disbanded after the season because of conflicts of interest among its franchises. Kerala has only performed well recently in the Ranji Trophy cricket competition, in 2017–18 reaching the quarterfinals for the first time in history. Football is one of the most widely played and watched sports with huge in this state support for club and district level matches. Kochi hosts Kerala Blasters FC in the Indian Super League. The Blasters are one of the most widely supported clubs in the country as well as the fifth most-followed football club from Asia in social media. Also, Kozhikode hosts Gokulam Kerala FC in the I-League as well as the Sait Nagjee Football Tournament. Kerala is one of the major footballing states in India along with West Bengal and Goa and has produced national players like I. M. Vijayan, C. V. Pappachan, V. P. Sathyan, U. Sharaf Ali, Jo Paul Ancheri, Ashique Kuruniyan, Muhammad Rafi, Jiju Jacob, Mashoor Shereef, Pappachen Pradeep, C.K. Vineeth, Anas Edathodika, Sahal Abdul Samad, and Rino Anto. The Kerala state football team has won the Santhosh Trophy seven times; in 1973, 1992, 1993, 2001, 2004, 2018, and 2022. They were also the runners-up eight times.

Among the prominent athletes hailing from the state are P. T. Usha, Shiny Wilson and M.D. Valsamma, all three of whom are recipients of the Padma Shri as well as Arjuna Award, while K. M. Beenamol and Anju Bobby George are Rajiv Gandhi Khel Ratna and Arjuna Award winners. T. C. Yohannan, Suresh Babu, Sinimol Paulose, Angel Mary Joseph, Mercy Kuttan, K. Saramma, K. C. Rosakutty, Padmini Selvan and Tintu Luka are the other Arjuna Award winners from Kerala. Volleyball is another popular sport and is often played on makeshift courts on sandy beaches along the coast. Jimmy George was a notable Indian volleyball player, rated in his prime as among the world's ten best players. Other popular sports include badminton, basketball and kabaddi. The Indian Hockey team captain P. R. Shreejesh, ace goalkeeper hails from Kerala. International Walkers from the state include K. T. Irfan.

For the 2017 FIFA U-17 World Cup in India, the Jawaharlal Nehru Stadium (Kochi), was chosen as one of the six venues where the game would be hosted in India. Greenfield International Stadium at located at Kariavattom in Thiruvananthapuram city, is India's first DBOT (design, build, operate and transfer) model outdoor stadium and it has hosted international cricket matches and international football matches including 2015 SAFF Championship.

== Tourism ==
Kerala's culture and traditions, coupled with its varied demographics, have made the state one of the most popular tourist destinations in India. In 2012, National Geographic's Traveller magazine named Kerala as one of the "ten paradises of the world" and "50 must see destinations of a lifetime". Travel and Leisure also described Kerala as "One of the 100 great trips for the 21st century". In 2012, it overtook the Taj Mahal to be the number one travel destination in Google's search trends for India. CNN Travel listed Kerala among its '19 best places to visit in 2019'. Kerala was named by TIME magazine in 2022 among the 50 extraordinary destinations to explore in its list of the World's Greatest Places. In 2025, Kerala was ranked 16th in the Rough Guides' list of the "World's Top 26 Destinations for 2026", making it the only Indian state to be included in the international travel guide's annual global destinations ranking.

Kerala's beaches, backwaters, lakes, mountain ranges, waterfalls, ancient ports, palaces, religious institutions and wildlife sanctuaries are major attractions for both domestic and international tourists. The city of Kochi ranks first in the total number of international and domestic tourists in Kerala. Until the early 1980s, Kerala was a relatively unknown destination compared to other states in the country. In 1986 the government of Kerala declared tourism an important industry and it was the first state in India to do so. Marketing campaigns launched by the Kerala Tourism Development Corporation, the government agency that oversees the tourism prospects of the state, resulted in the growth of the tourism industry. Many advertisements branded Kerala with the tagline Kerala, God's Own Country. Kerala tourism is a global brand and regarded as one of the destinations with highest recall. In 2006, Kerala attracted 8.5 million tourists, an increase of 23.7% over the previous year, making the state one of the fastest-growing popular destinations in the world. In 2011, tourist inflow to Kerala crossed the 10-million mark.

Ayurvedic tourism has become very popular since the 1990s, and private agencies have played a notable role in tandem with the initiatives of the Tourism Department. Kerala is known for its ecotourism initiatives which include mountaineering, trekking and bird-watching programmes in the Western Ghats as the major activities. The state's tourism industry is a major contributor to the state's economy, growing at the rate of 13.3%. The revenue from tourism increased five-fold between 2001 and 2011 and crossed the ₹ 190 billion mark in 2011. According to the Economic Times Kerala netted a record revenue of INR 365280.1 million from the tourism sector in 2018, clocking an increase of Rs 28743.3 million from the previous year. Over 16.7 million tourists visited Kerala in 2018 as against 15.76 million the previous year, recording an increase of 5.9%. The industry provides employment to approximately 1.2 million people.

The state's only drive-in beach, Muzhappilangad Beach in Kannur, which stretches across 5 kilometres (3.1 mi) of sand, was chosen by the BBC as one of the top six drive-in beaches in the world in 2016. Idukki Dam, the world's second arch dam, and Asia's first is at Idukki. The major beaches are at Kovalam, Varkala, Kozhikode, Fort Kochi, Cherai, Alappuzha, Ponnani, Kadalundi, Tanur, Chaliyam, Payyambalam, Kappad, Muzhappilangad and Bekal. Popular hill stations are at Ponmudi, Wayanad, Vagamon, Munnar, Peermade, Ramakkalmedu, Arimbra, Paithalmala of Kannur district, Kodikuthimala, and Nelliampathi. Munnar is 4,500 feet above sea level and is known for tea plantations, and a variety of flora and fauna. Kerala's ecotourism destinations include 12 wildlife sanctuaries and two national parks: Periyar Tiger Reserve, Parambikulam Wildlife Sanctuary, Chinnar Wildlife Sanctuary, Thattekad Bird Sanctuary, Wayanad Wildlife Sanctuary, Kadalundi Bird Sanctuary, Karimpuzha Wildlife Sanctuary, Muthanga Wildlife Sanctuary, Aralam Wildlife Sanctuary, Eravikulam National Park, and Silent Valley National Park are the most popular among them. The Kerala backwaters are an extensive network of interlocking rivers (41 west-flowing rivers), lakes, and canals that centre around Alleppey, Kumarakom, Ponnani, Nileshwaram, and Punnamada (where the annual Nehru Trophy Boat Race is held in August), Pathiramanal a small island in Muhamma. Padmanabhapuram Palace and the Mattancherry Palace are two nearby heritage sites.

== See also ==
- Outline of Kerala
- South India
- Dravidian peoples
- List of municipal corporations in Kerala
- List of taluks of Kerala
- List of urban local bodies in Kerala
- List of districts of Kerala
- List of revenue divisions of Kerala
- Kerala school of astronomy and mathematics

== Notes ==
=== Sources ===
- Chandran, V. P., ed. (2018). Mathrubhumi Yearbook Plus – 2019 (in Malayalam). Kozhikode: Mathrubhumi Printing & Publishing Company Limited. ASIN 8182676444.
