= Second Oommen ministry =

2011–2016 government of Kerala, India

Second Oommen Chandy ministry
- 21st Ministry of Kerala
- 2011-2016
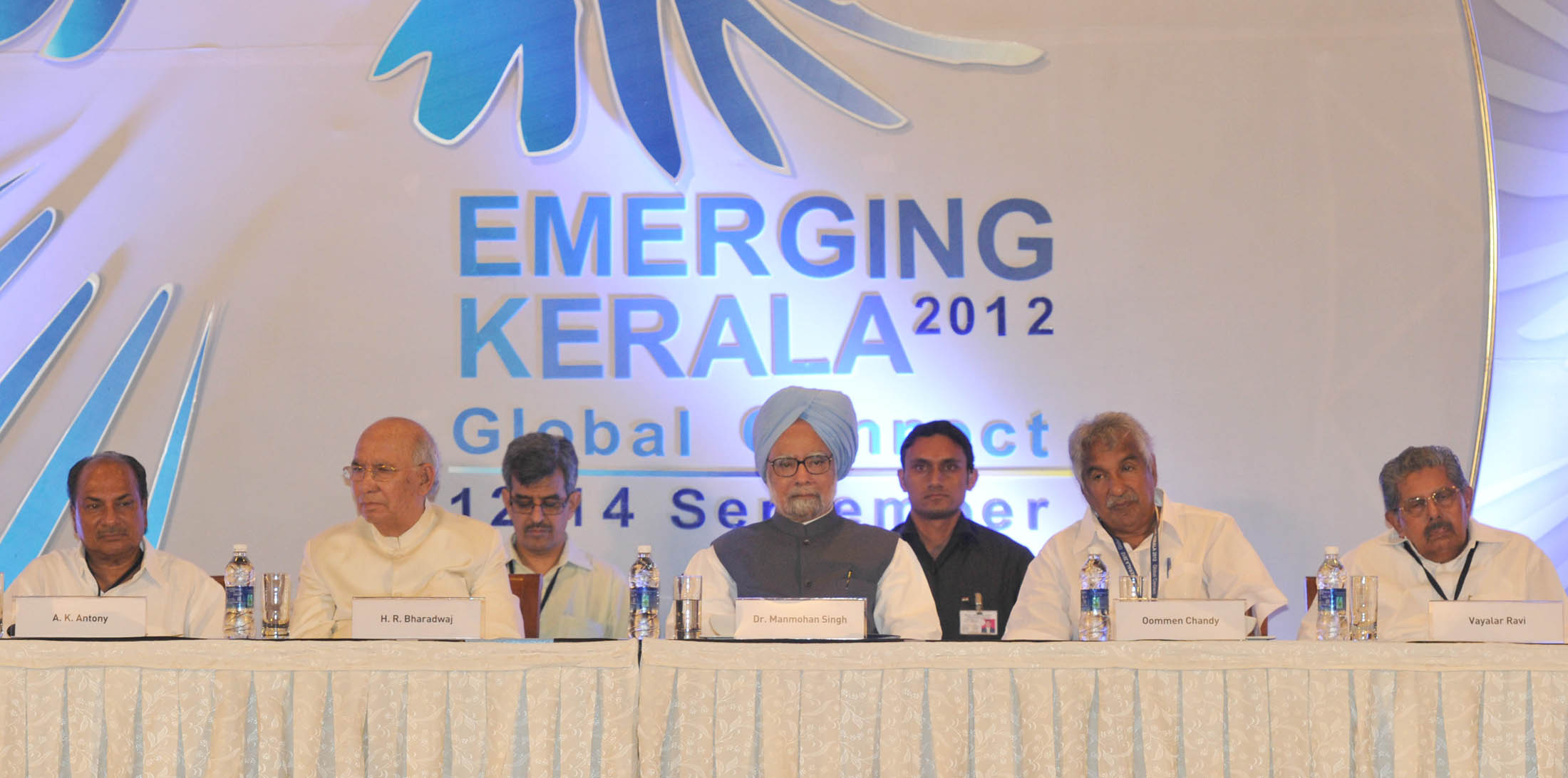
- Oommen Chandy, the Chief Minister of Kerala, with prime minister Manmohan Singh and Defence Minister A. K. Antony at Emerging Kerala summit, 2012
- Date formed: 18 May 2011
- Date dissolved: 24 May 2016

People and organisations
- Head of state: R. S. Gavai (till 7 September 2011); M. O. H. Farook (8 September 2011 - 26 January 2012); H. R. Bhardwaj (26 January 2012 - 22 March 2013); Nikhil Kumar (23 March 2013 - 5 March 2014 ); Sheila Dikshit (5 March 2014 - 26 August 2014); P. Sathasivam (from 5 September 2014)
- Head of government: Oommen Chandy
- No. of ministers: 20
- Member parties: UDF
- Status in legislature: Majority
- Opposition party: LDF
- Opposition leader: V. S. Achuthanandan

History
- Election: 2011
- Legislature term: 5 years
- Predecessor: Achuthanandan ministry
- Successor: First Vijayan ministry

The United Democratic Front government led by Oommen Chandy sworn in on 18 May 2011. Seven of the total 20 members of the Cabinet took office on 18 May and the rest sworn in on 23 May after completing discussion with member parties of the UDF.

== Ministers ==
S.No	Name	Department	Constituency	Party
1.	Oommen Chandy Chief Minister	General Administration, Finance; State Treasury; Taxes & Duties; Excise; Fisheries; Port; Law; Housing; All India Services; Science and Technology; Scientific Institutes; Personnel and Administrative Reforms; Elections; Integration; Sainik Welfare; Distress Relief; State Hospitality; Inter State River Waters; Administration of Civil and Criminal Justice	Puthuppally	INC
Cabinet Ministers
2.	Ramesh Chennithala	Minister for Home Affairs; Vigilance; Jail; Fire & Rescue	Haripad	INC
3.	P. K. Kunhalikutty	Industries; IT; Trade & Commerce; Mining & Geology; Wakf & Haj Affairs	Vengara	IUML
4.	Thiruvanchoor Radhakrishnan	Forests, Wild Life Protection; Environment; Sports; Kerala State Film Development Corporation; Kerala State Chalachitra Academy; Kerala Cultural Workers Welfare Fund Board; Road Transport; Motor Vehicles; Water Transport	Kottayam	INC
5.	Aryadan Muhammed	Electricity; Railways; Post and Telegraph; Pollution Control	Nilambur	INC
6.	K. C. Joseph	Information & Public Relations; Rural Development; Cultural affairs; NORKA; Dairy	Irikkur	INC
7.	Shibu Baby John	Labour and Employment	Chavara	RSP
8.	V. S. Sivakumar	Health; Devaswom	Thiruvananthapuram	INC
9.	V. K. Ebrahimkunju	Public Works	Kalamassery	IUML
10.	K. P. Mohanan	Agriculture; Agriculture university and research; Warehousing; State Press; Animal husbandry	Kuthuparamba	SJD
11.	P. J. Joseph	Water Resources; Irrigation; Inland Navigation	Thodupuzha	KC(M)
12.	M. K. Muneer	Social Welfare; Grama Panchayath	Kozhikode South	IUML
13.	A.P. Anil Kumar	Tourism; Welfare of Scheduled Castes and Backward Classes	Wandoor	INC
14.	Adoor Prakash	Revenue; Coir	Konni	INC
15.	C. N. Balakrishnan	Co-operation; Khadi; Village Industries	Wadakkancherry	INC
16.	P. K. Jayalakshmi	Scheduled tribe; Youth welfare; State Archives; Museums, Zoo	Mananthavady	INC
17.	Anoop Jacob	Food; Civil supplies; Registration	Piravom	KC(J)
18.	Manjalamkuzhi Ali	Urban development affairs; Minority welfare	Perintalmanna	IUML
19.	P. K. Abdu Rabb	Education; Literacy; NCC	Tirurangadi	IUML

== Ex-Ministers ==
- T. M. Jacob - The Minister for Food, Civil supplies and Registration, died on 30 October 2011, and his son Anoop Jacob won from Piravom constituency in the by-election. He was given the same Ministry his father held and took office on 12 April 2012
- K. B. Ganesh Kumar, of Kerala Congress (B), a single-MLA constituent of the ruling UDF, resigned from the Council of Ministers on 1 April 2013 on personal issues. The Chief Minister then restructured the ministry by swapping different ministries between the existing ministers.
- K. M. Mani - Resigned from the post of Minister of Finance and Law on 10 November 2015 after the Kerala High Court's comments on his alleged involvement in Kerala BAR licence scam and bribery case.
- K. Babu - Resigned from the post of Minister of Excise, Fisheries and Ports on 23 January 2016 after the Kerala High Court's comments on his alleged involvement in Kerala Bar licence scam and bribery case.

== Chair ==
speaker -

- G. Karthikeyan
- N. Sakthan

== Achievements ==
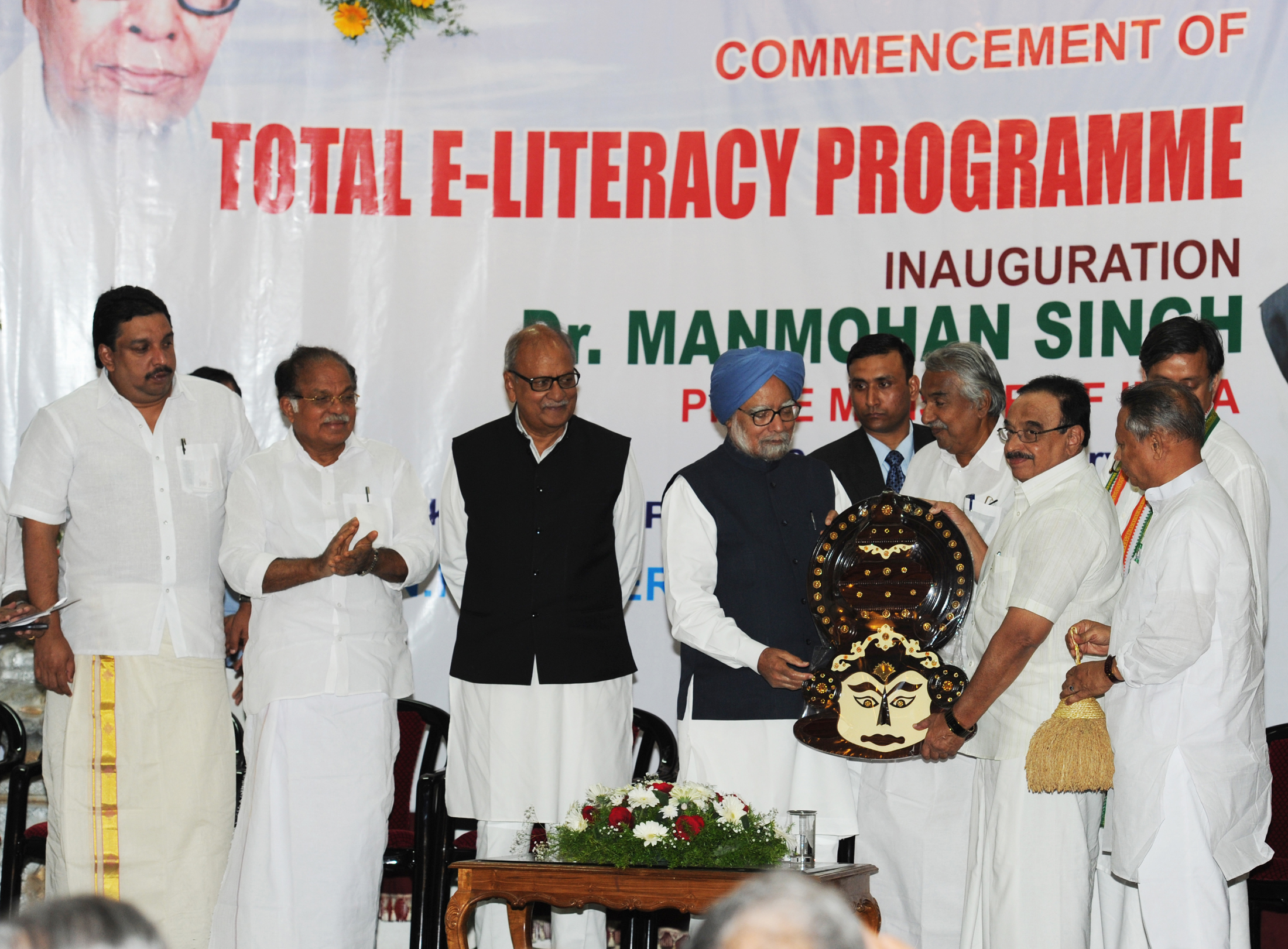
The inauguration of Complete E-literacy project at Thiruvananthapuram (2014)

The Second Oommen Chandy ministry (2011–16) adopted the motto Vikasanavum Karuthalum (Development and care). Sanctioning of Unemployment allowance, and welfare measures for the labourers, were some of the measure of his government. The Karunya benevolent scheme was implemented in the year 2011-12 for the free treatment of patients with cancer, haemophilia, kidney, and heart diseases. More Cochlear implant surgeries were performed during the period. More Organ implantation surgeries were done through Mruthasanjeevani project. Oommen Chandy also received the United Nations' Public Service Award for his Mass Contact Programme (Jana Samparkka Paripadi), for hearing and solving the complaints of citizens.

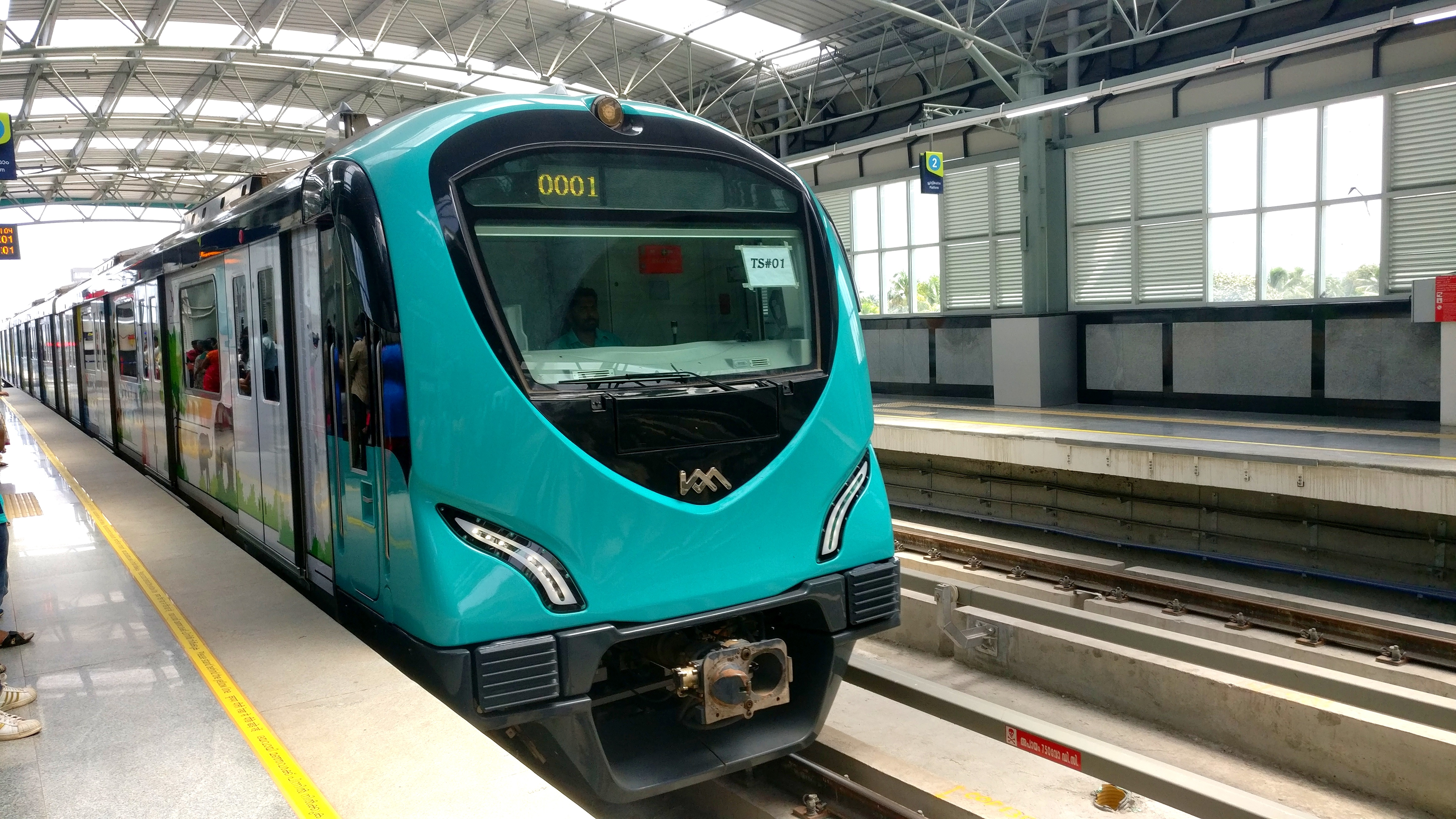
Kochi metro was the fastest completed metro project in India on its inauguration

Oommen Chandy is the only Indian Chief Minister to achieve award for public service from United Nations. Oommen's regime as a Chief Minister (2011–16) was instrumental in beginning the construction of several massive infrastructure projects as well as some human-welfare schemes in Kerala which includes the Kannur International Airport in Kannur, the Kochi Metro at Kochi, the Vizhinjam International Seaport at Thiruvananthapuram, and Smart City project.

The Technopark at Thiruvananthapuram became the largest Information Technology park in India with the inauguration of Phase-3 in 2014. The Taurus Downtown at Technopark was commenced during the period 2011–16. The phase-2 of InfoPark, Kochi was inaugurated in May 2015. Phase-2 of InfoPark Thrissur was completed during the same period. The Park Centre of Cybercity at Kozhikode was formally opened by IT Minister P.K. Kunhalikutty on 15 February 2014. UL Cyberpark at Kozhikode was inaugurated in January 2016.

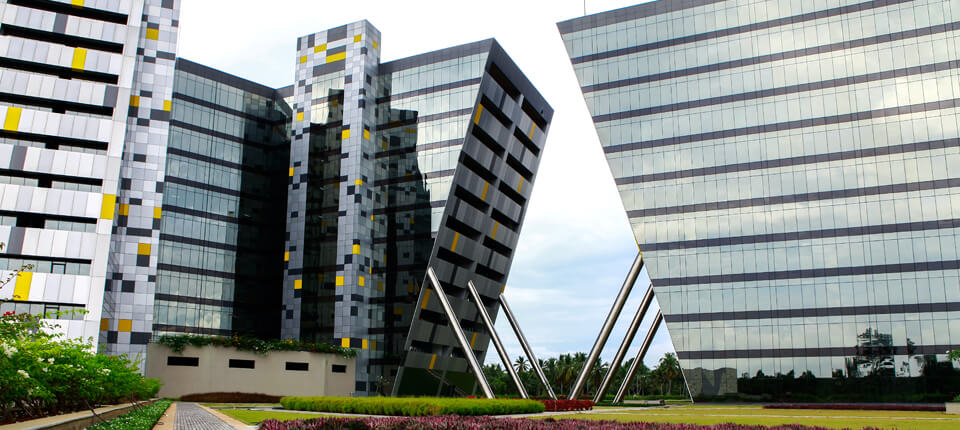
Technopark, Trivandrum became the largest Information Technology park in India with the inauguration of Phase-3 project in the year 2014

It was also during his reign that 12 new Taluks, 28 new Municipalities, and Kannur Municipal Corporation were formed, for the decentralisation and proper utilisation of resources in the state, in all regions of the state. It was the largest Taluk delimitation in the state of Kerala after 1957. During his period, 227 Road Bridges worth nearly Rs 1,600 crore were built across Kerala, which was the ever-highest in the state. Kozhikode bypass was completed and the works of Kollam Bypass and Alappuzha Bypass roads were restarted during 2011–16. The projects of Karamana-Kaliyikkavila bypass and Kazhakootam-Karode bypass for Thiruvananthapuram city were designated and started. The Kochi-Mangalore GAIL pipeline was commissioned by the Second Oommen Chandy ministry in 2013.

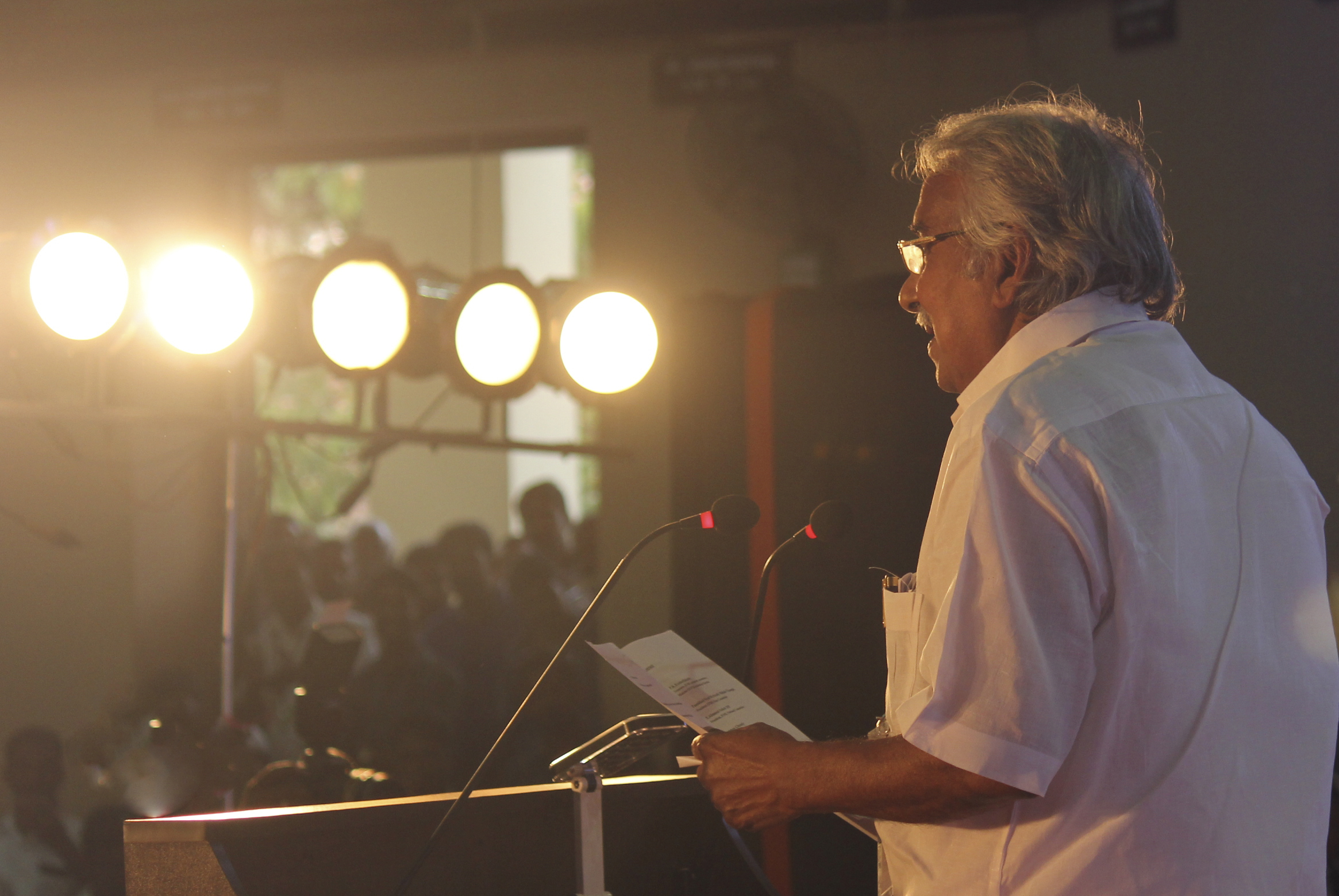
Oommen Chandy in September 2015

As a part of the Public health infrastructure project, New Government Medical Colleges were established in the state in 2013, after a gap of 31 years. The Indian Institute of Technology at Palakkad was established in the year 2015. The universities founded in 2011-16 period include the Thunchath Ezhuthachan Malayalam University at Tirur (2012) and APJ Abdul Kalam Technological University at Thiruvananthapuram (2014). The K. R. Narayanan National Institute of Visual Science and Arts at Kottayam was inaugurated in January 2016. In 2015, the Cochin International Airport became the world's first fully solar powered airport with the inauguration of a dedicated solar plant. It was given Champion of the Earth in 2018 by the United Nations. The airport was awarded The Best Airport in Asia-Pacific in 2020 (5 to 15 million passengers per annum) by Airports Council International. The Kerala Urban Road Transport Corporation (KURTC) was formed under KSRTC in 2015 to manage affairs related to urban transportation. It was inaugurated on 12 April 2015 at Thevara. Works on the last phase of Kollam Bypass was started on 27 May 2015.

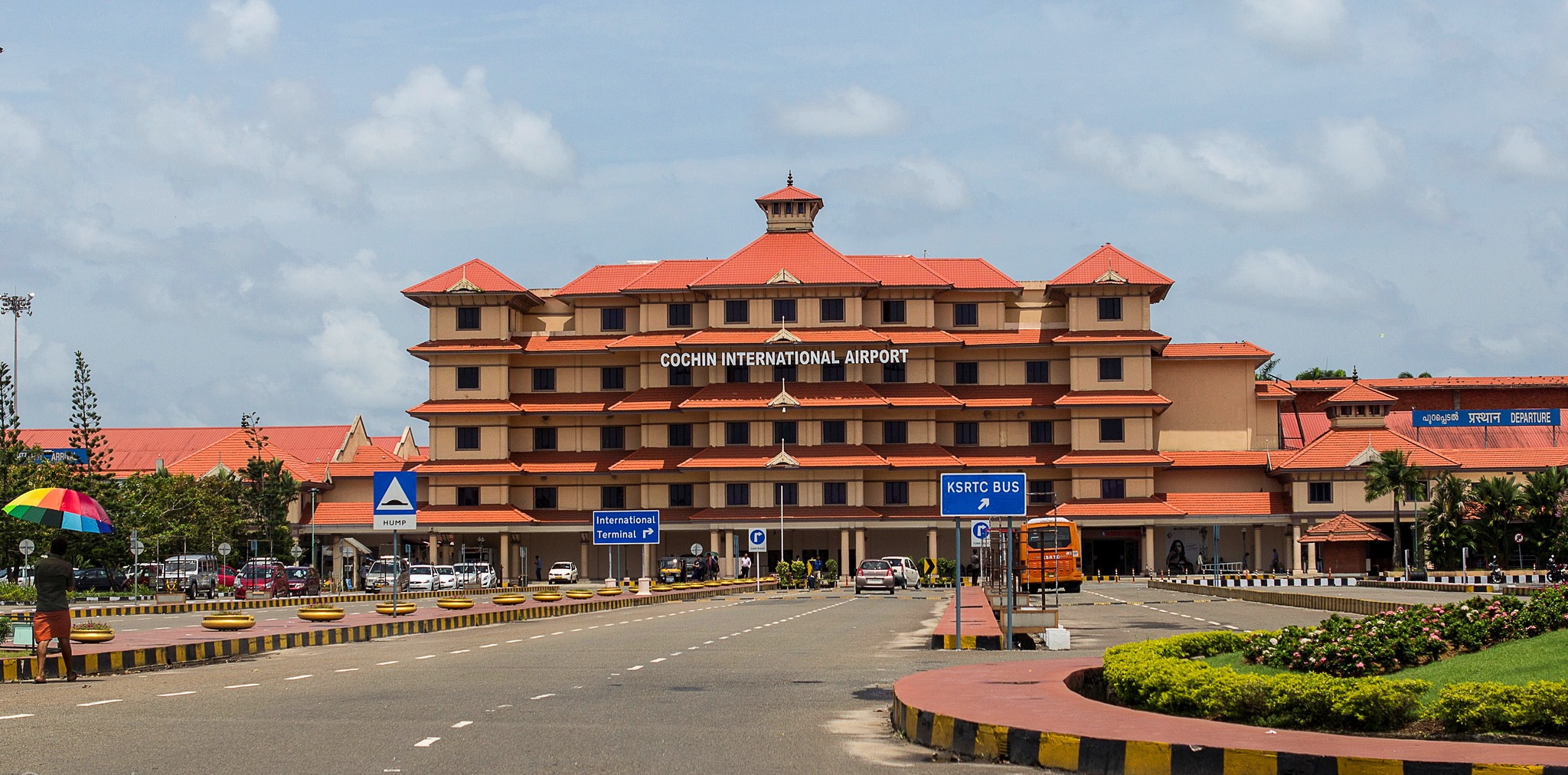
Cochin International Airport is the first airport in the world to be fully powered by solar energy. It became so in 2015

Social welfare pensions were doubled during the era of Second Oommen Chandy ministry. UDF government of 2011 increased it to Rs.600 which was only Rs.300 until 2011. The Second Oommen Chandy government distributed pensions ranging from Rs 800 - Rs 1,500. Social welfare pensions which had been distributed to 12.9 lakh people until 2011 were extended to 34.43 lakh during the period 2011–16. Pensions for the disabled and widows were increased to Rs 800. Old-age pensions were increased to Rs 1,500 for those above 75 years and Rs 1,100 to those above 80 years. Other social welfare measures during Oommen Chandy's reign include free ration for those who lost their employment, and 4,14,552 houses for those who hadn't homes before. Free rice were given to those who didn't belong to Above Poverty Line (APL). Food kits were distributed to the people during Onam, Ramdan, and Christmas. Rubber Subsidy to ensure a minimum price of Rs 150/kg was implemented in 2015. The Kerala Public Service Commission filled the vacant posts during 2011–16. As many as 1,67,096 job candidates were appointed, setting a record. As many as 46,223 posts were created in the same period. The Second Oommen Chandy ministry had also took decision to prohibit Liquor in the state by discouraging bars. The number of political killings were relatively low (11) during the period 2011–16 in the state. Kerala was declared as the first complete digital state of India on 27 February 2016.

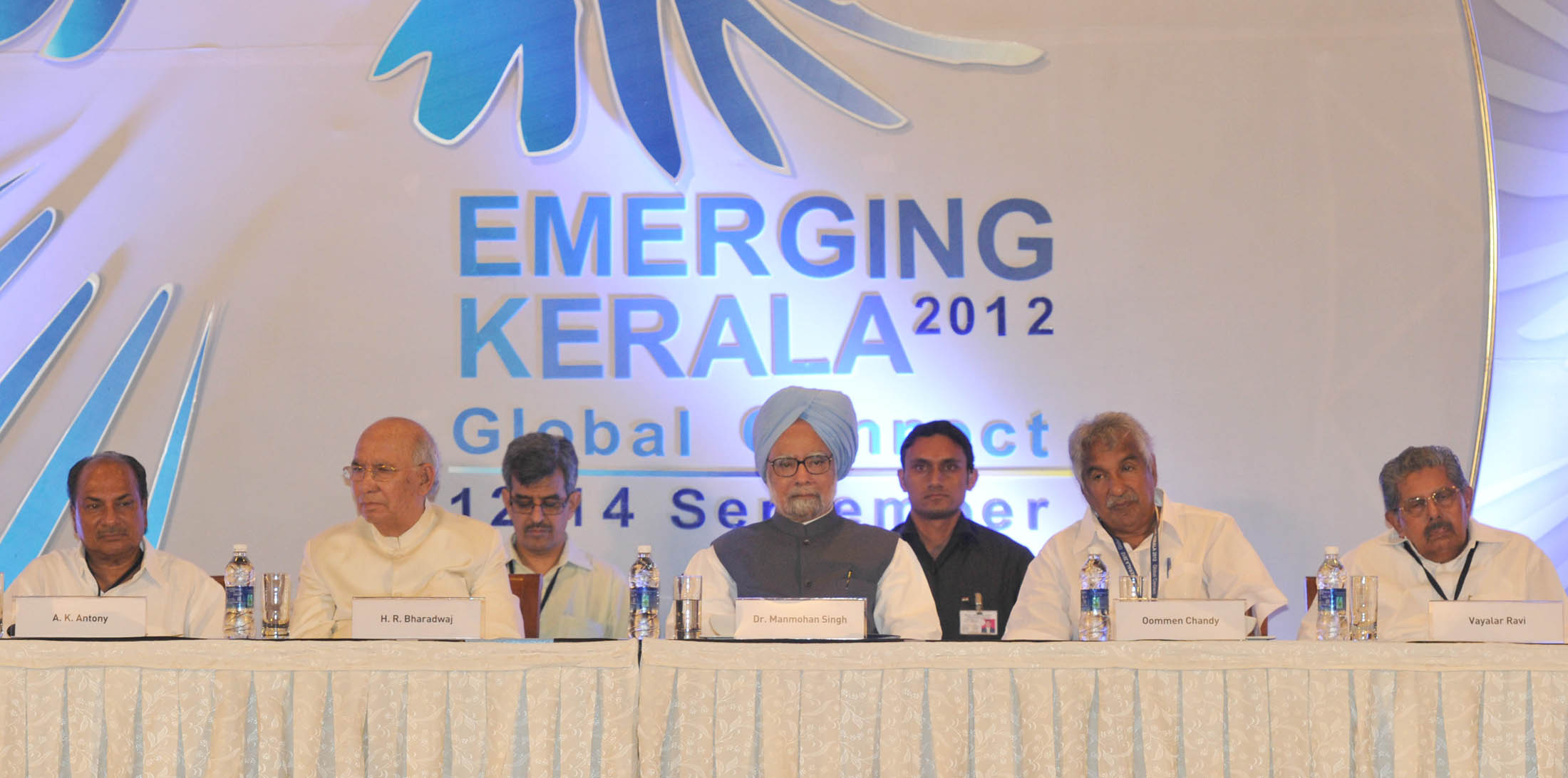
Emerging Kerala Summit, 2012

Twenty-six sectors were identified for showcasing in the Emerging Kerala summit of 2012 held at Kochi to attract investments. Those included:

- Tourism
- Healthcare services
- Manufacturing including Engineering & Automotive
- Projects under MSME Sector
- IT / ITES / IT Infrastructure
- Science & Technology
- Trade & Retailing
- Food & Agro Processing and Value-addition
- Ports, Shipbuilding
- Textiles & Garments
- Electronics
- Knowledge / Education sector
- Green Energy
- Bio-Technology, Nano Technology, Pharmaceuticals
- Urban Infrastructure Development
- Infotainment
- Logistics
- Petrochemicals
- Gas based Industries
- Airport Infrastructure, Aeroplane & Helicopter services
- Centres of Excellence
- Infrastructure development (Road, Rail, Power, Water Supply, Sewage)

The first edition of Emerging Kerala summit, was held from 12 to 14 September 2012 at the Le Meridien International Convention Centre, Kochi. The event was organised by the Kerala State Industrial Development Corporation (KSIDC), to highlight investment opportunities available in Kerala and advertise to the world its state of readiness to receive investors. The Hon'ble Prime Minister of India Dr. Manmohan Singh inaugurated the three-day event. The meet could bring in 45 specific project proposals with an investment of over Rs.40,000 crore, including Bharat Petroleum Corporation Ltd's Kochi Refinery expansion and another joint venture project of Rs.18,000 crore; Volkswagen's engine assembly unit (Rs.2,000 crore); hospital and pre-cast concrete structure manufacturing unit (Rs.570 crore); and solar energy plant (Rs.500crore). A number of Mega projects were conceptualized and developed in the State following the summit, the most prominent of which are as follows:

- Kochi-Mangalore GAIL Pipeline
- Vizhinjam International Seaport
- Kochi Metro
- Thiruvananthapuram Light Metro and Kozhikode Light Metro
- Petroleum Chemicals & Petrochemical Investment Region
- Kochi-Palakkad National Investment and Manufacturing Zone
- Indian Institute of Information Technology, Kottayam
- Thiruvananthapuram–Kasargode Semi High Speed Rail Corridor
- Kerala Seaplane
- Electronic hub at Kochi
- Titanium Sponge Plant Project at Kollam
- Oceanarium project at Kochi
- Bio 360 Life Sciences Park at Thiruvananthapuram
- Gas-based powerplant at Cheemeni, Kasaragod
- Kochi LNG Terminal

== Accusations ==
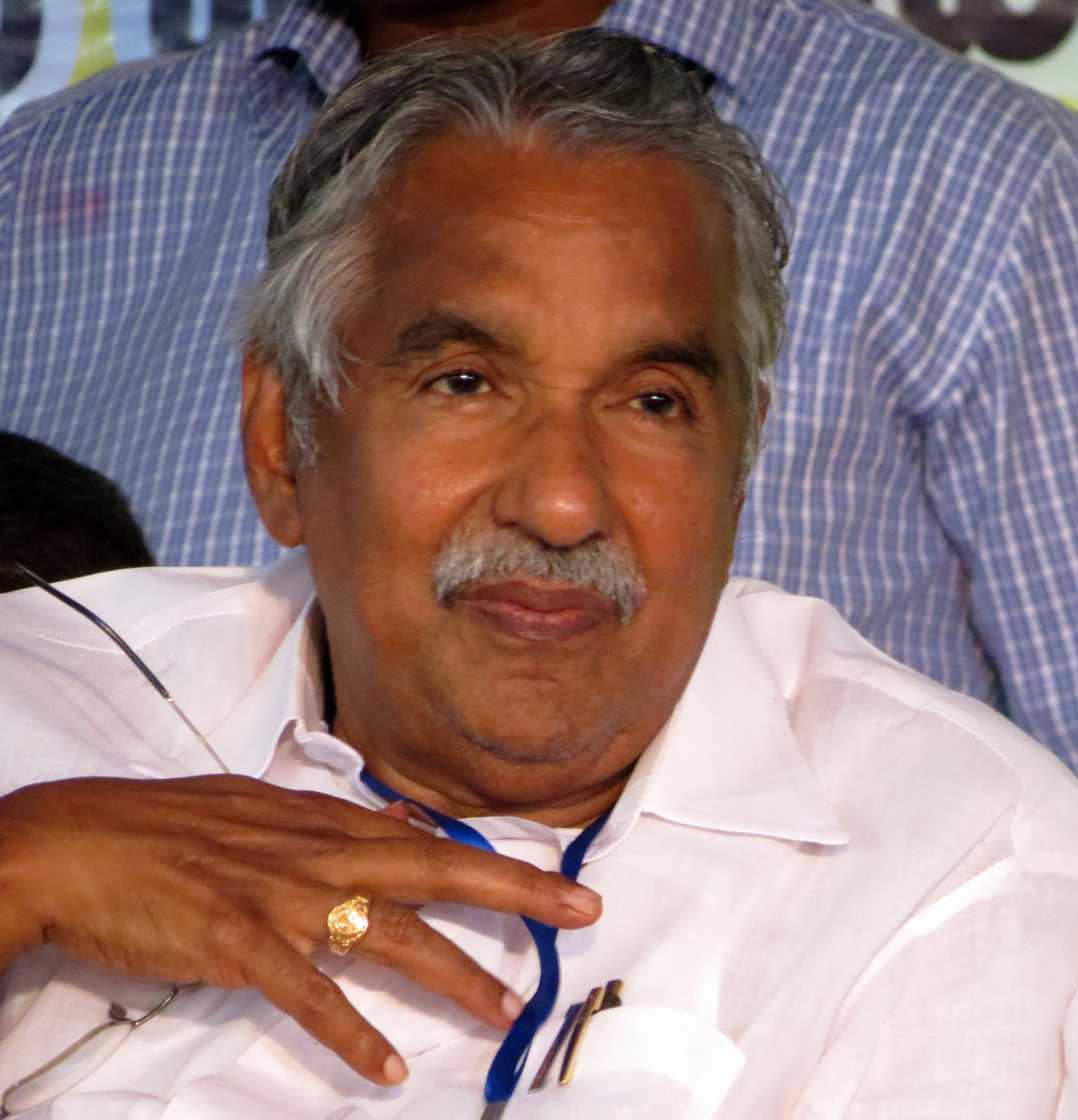
Oommen Chandy in January 2013

=== 2013 Kerala solar panel scam accusation ===
2013 Kerala solar panel scam was one of the main scams accused by the LDF-led opposition during the reign of Second Oommen Chandy ministry. It was also one of the main election issues accused by LDF during 2016 Kerala Legislative Assembly election.

However, later the Crime Branch appointed by First Vijayan ministry in the year 2018 found that there was no evidence against Oommen Chandy in the scam. As part of the procedures, the state home secretary T. K. Jose had forwarded a report to the central government. According to the report, no evidence could be collected against Oommen Chandy and the Crime Branch failed to confirm that the incident mentioned in the complaint actually happened. The case was handed over to the central agency after several teams of the Kerala Police, repeatedly failed to prove the allegations against Oommen Chandy.

=== Vizhinjam port corruption accusation ===
The opposition led by CPI(M) had accused corruption in Vizhinjam International Seaport project ahead of 2016 Kerala Legislative Assembly election.

The First Vijayan ministry appointed a three-member judicial commission under Justice C. N. Ramachandran for investigation in May 2017.

The commission in 2018 concluded that there was no corruption with the State's dream project and that there was no misuse of political power in the port project. The commission report states that there was no evidence to prove there was corruption. C. N. Ramachandran said that, "Nobody came forward with any specific corruption charges against any individual and nobody ventured to give any evidence. When there is no allegation of corruption against anyone, there is no need to investigate corruption against anyone. That is why commission has not found corruption against anyone."

=== Pattoor Land Case ===
Pattoor Land Case was accused by the LDF-led opposition ahead of 2016 Kerala Legislative Assembly election. In February 2018, the Kerala High Court pointed out that the Vigilance registered the First information report based on the wrong report prepared by Jacob Thomas. The court said that the claim that the property vests with Kerala Water Authority was not based on any document. As the High Court rejected the case, UDF government got a clean chit. The High Court found that Oommen Chandy or UDF government was not involved in any corruption.

=== Bar bribery case ===
Bar bribery case was accused by the LDF-led opposition against K. M. Mani, who was the minister of finance in Second Oommen Chandy ministry, and a leader of Kerala Congress (M). Bar Hotel Owners Association president Biju Ramesh had alleged Mani had taken Rs 1 crore bribe to reopen bars closed by the Oommen Chandy government as part of its liquor policy. Jacob Thomas was the Vigilance Director when the accusation was made against the then finance minister. In March 2018, the Kerala Vigilance and Anti-Corruption Bureau gave cleanchit to K. M. Mani stating that there is no evidence against Mani in the case. The case against Mani was closed in April 2019. In March 2021, the vigilance gave cleanchit to K. Babu, a Congress leader and minister of Kerala during 2011–2016, who was accused of a corruption of Rs 100 cr over issuing new bar licenses and closure of liquor outlets close to bars. The report submitted by vigilance central range superintendent requested the court to cancel the case observing it to be baseless. The vigilance found that there was no evidence to prove that Babu was corrupt.

=== Ice cream parlour case ===
The case dates back to 1997. The case came back in focus in January 2011 ahead of 2011 Kerala Legislative Assembly election. The Ice cream parlour case was accused against P. K. Kunhalikutty, a former minister of Kerala, by the LDF-led opposition. In 2012, the Special Investigation Team who investigated the case gave cleanchit to Kunhalikutty, stating that there was no evidence to prove involvement of Kunhalikutty in the scam.

== Trivia ==
- Manjalamkuzhi Ali sworn in when UDF agreed Muslim League's claim for a fifth minister. Ali sworn as Minister for Urban Affairs and Minority Welfare.
- Ramesh Chennithala of Indian National Congress, representing Haripad Constituency sworn in as the Minister for Home and Vigilance on 1 January 2014.
- The first shuffling of portfolios occurred on 12 April 2012, with the inclusion of Manjalamkuzhi Ali and Anoop Jacob. The Chief Minister gave up the charge of Home Department. Thiruvanchoor Radhakrishnan, earlier in charge of Revenue Department was given the charge of Home Department, and Adoor Prakash, earlier in charge of Health Department, got Revenue Department. Health Department was handed over to V. S. Sivakumar, who was in charge of Transport Department, and Aryadan Muhammad was given the additional department of Transport. Some minor departments were also changed.

== See also ==
- List of Kerala ministers
- Chief Ministers of Kerala
- History of Kerala
- List of current Indian chief ministers
- Oommen Chandy
- Achuthanandan ministry
