= Oommen Chandy =

10th Chief Minister of Kerala (1943–2023)

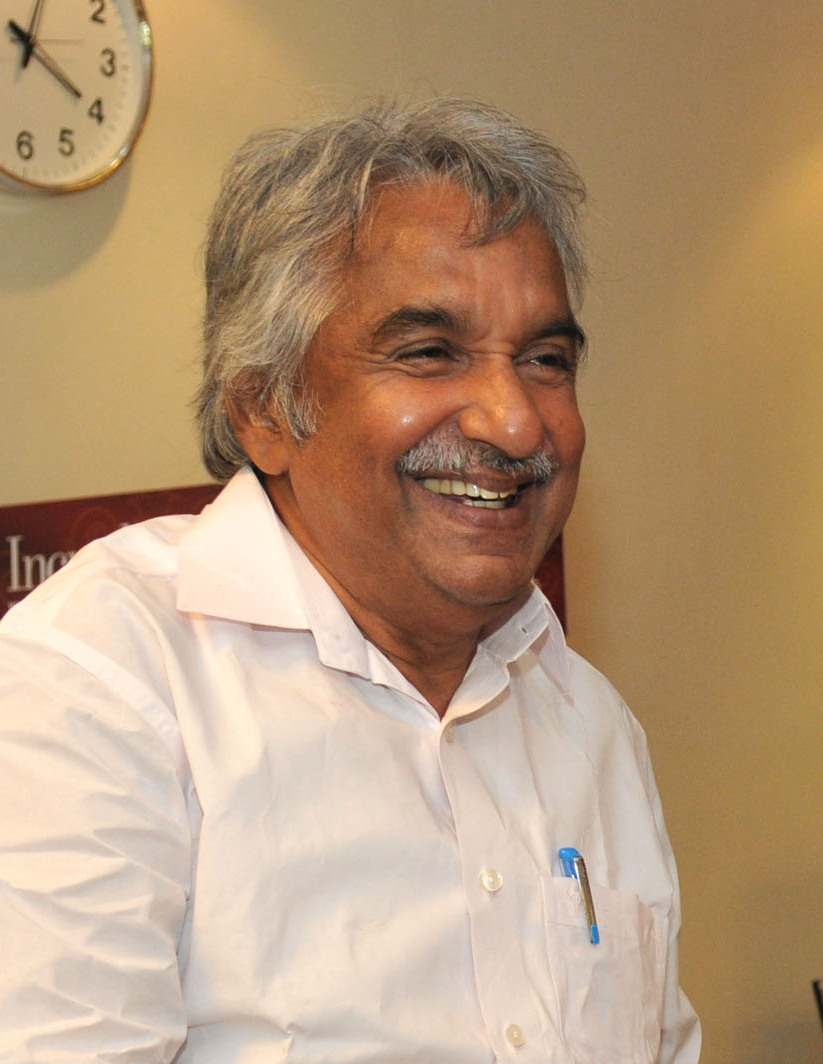
- Oommen Chandy in 2011

10th Chief Minister of Kerala
- In office 18 May 2011 – 20 May 2016
- Ministries and Departments: List: General Administration; Finance; State Treasury; Taxes & Duties; Excise; Fisheries; Port; Law; Housing; All India Services; Science and Technology; Scientific Institutes; Personnel and Administrative Reforms; Elections; Integration; Sainik Welfare; Distress Relief; State Hospitality; Inter State River Waters; Administration of Civil and Criminal Justice
- Preceded by: V. S. Achuthanandan
- Succeeded by: Pinarayi Vijayan
- In office 31 August 2004 – 12 May 2006
- Ministries & Departments: List: Home; Vigilance; Information and Public Relations; General Administration; Information Technology; Science & Technology; Environment; Planning & Economic Affairs; NORKA (Non-Resident Keralites Affairs); All other subjects not allotted to any other Minister
- Preceded by: A. K. Antony
- Succeeded by: V. S. Achuthanandan

Member of the Kerala Legislative Assembly
- In office 1970 – 18 July 2023
- Preceded by: E. M. George
- Succeeded by: Chandy Oommen
- Constituency: Puthuppally

Minister of Home Affairs, Government of Kerala
- In office 18 May 2011 – 13 April 2012
- Chief Minister: Himself
- Preceded by: Kodiyeri Balakrishnan
- Succeeded by: Thiruvanchoor Radhakrishnan
- In office 31 August 2004 – 12 May 2006
- Chief Minister: Himself
- Preceded by: A. K. Antony
- Succeeded by: Kodiyeri Balakrishnan
- In office 28 December 1981 – 17 March 1982
- Chief Minister: K. Karunakaran
- Preceded by: T. K. Ramakrishnan
- Succeeded by: Vayalar Ravi

Minister for Finance, Government of Kerala
- In office 10 November 2015 – 20 May 2016
- Chief Minister: Himself
- Preceded by: K. M. Mani
- Succeeded by: T. M. Thomas Isaac
- In office 2 July 1991 – 22 June 1994
- Chief Minister: K. Karunakaran
- Preceded by: V. Viswanatha Menon
- Succeeded by: C. V. Padmarajan

Minister for Labour, Government of Kerala
- In office 11 April 1977 – 27 October 1978
- Chief Minister: K. Karunakaran; A. K. Antony
- Preceded by: Baby John
- Succeeded by: M. K. Raghavan

Leader of the Opposition, Kerala Legislative Assembly
- In office 18 May 2006 – 14 May 2011
- Preceded by: V. S. Achuthanandan
- Succeeded by: V. S. Achuthanandan

General Secretary of the AICC for Andhra Pradesh
- In office 27 May 2018 – 18 July 2023
- President: Rahul Gandhi; Sonia Gandhi (Interim); Mallikarjun Kharge

Personal details
- Born: 31 October 1943 Kumarakom, Kingdom of Travancore, British India (present day Kottayam, Kerala, India)
- Died: 18 July 2023 (aged 79) Bengaluru, Karnataka, India
- Party: Indian National Congress
- Spouse: Mariamma Oommen
- Children: 3, including Chandy Oommen
- Parent(s): Chandy and Baby
- Education: CMS College; St. Berchmans College (BA); Govt. Law College, Ernakulam (LLB)
- Website: www.oommenchandy.org
- As of 9 April 2014

Oommen Chandy (31 October 1943 – 18 July 2023) was an Indian lawyer and statesman who served as the tenth chief minister of Kerala, serving from 2004 to 2006 and 2011 to 2016. He served also as the leader of the opposition in the Kerala Legislative Assembly from 2006 to 2011.

He represented Puthuppally constituency as a member of the Legislative Assembly (MLA) in the State Assembly from 1970 until his death in 2023, making him the longest-serving member of the Kerala Legislature Assembly. He received a award for public service from the United Nations in 2013.

In 2018, he was appointed the general secretary of the All India Congress Committee, in charge of the state of Andhra Pradesh. He was also a Congress Working Committee member at the time of his death.

== Early life and education ==
Oommen Chandy was born on 31 October 1943 in Kumarakom, Kottayam district, as the son of Baby and K. O. Chandy, of Karottu Vallakkalil house.

He was named after his paternal grandfather, V. J. Oommen (Vallakkalil), a member of the Travancore Legislative Council. Oommen ventured into the political arena as an activist of Kerala's largest student organisation Kerala Students Union, the student wing of the Indian National Congress. He was the unit president of the KSU at St. George High School, Puthupally, and went on to become the state president of the organisation. Oommen completed his pre-university course from CMS College, Kottayam and received a B.A. in economics from St. Berchmans College, Changanassery. Later, he earned a bachelor's degree in law (LL.B) from the Government Law College, Ernakulam.

== Political life ==
Oommen started his political career through the Kerala Students Union, in which he served as president from 1967 to 1969. He was elected as the president of the State Youth Congress in 1970.

=== Electoral performance ===
Oommen represented the Puthuppally constituency for five decades, having been elected to the Kerala Legislative Assembly in 1970, 1977, 1980, 1982, 1987, 1991, 1996, 2001, 2006, 2011, 2016, and 2021. During his legislative career, he also served as chairman of the Public Accounts Committee from 1996 to 1998.

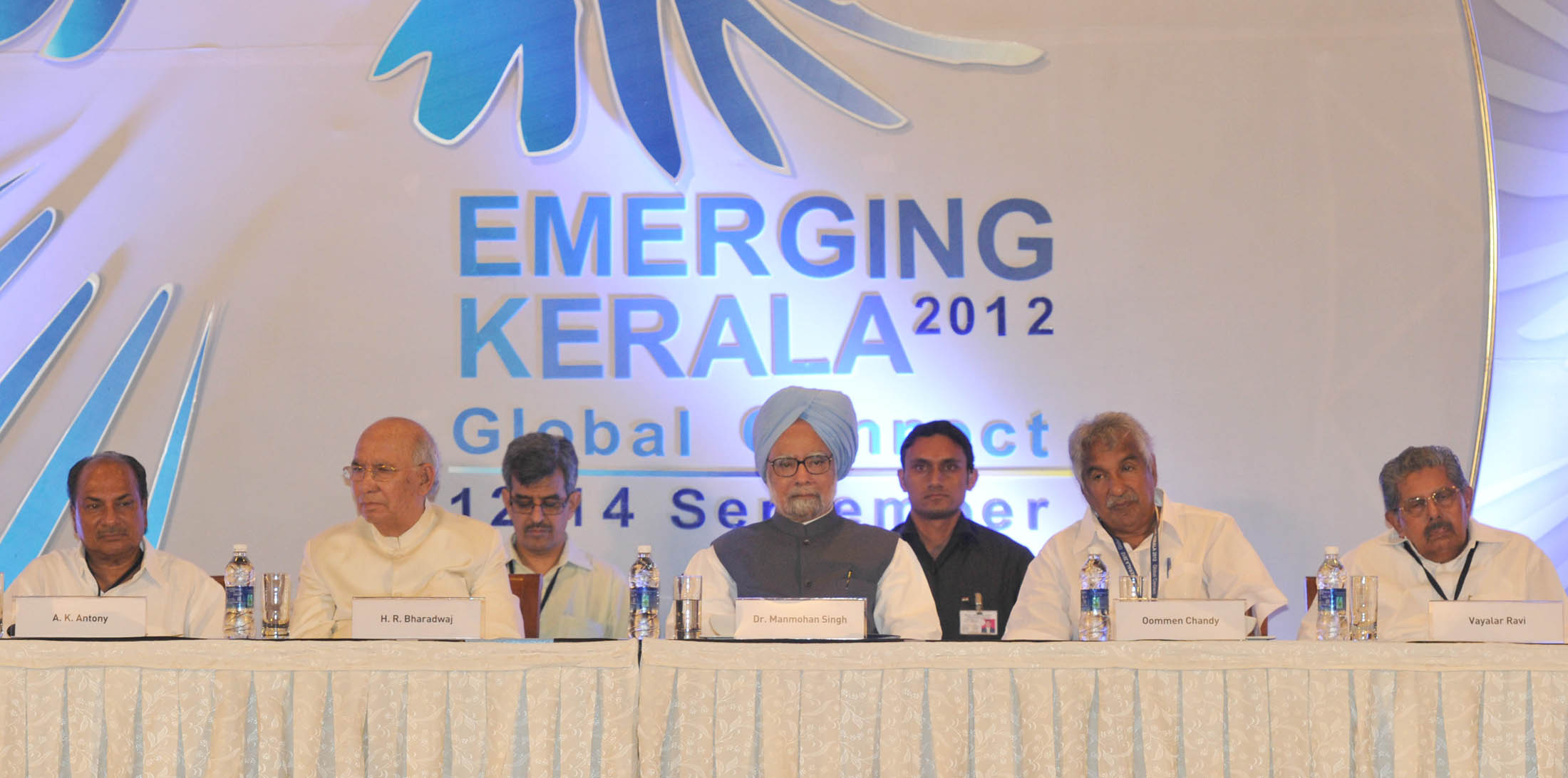
Oommen Chandy with the prime minister Manmohan Singh and Defence Minister A. K. Antony at Emerging Kerala summit, 2012

Election victories
Year	Closest rival	Majority (votes)
1970	E. M. George (CPI(M))	7,288
1977	P. C. Cherian (BLD)	15,910
1980	M. R. G. Panicker (NDP)	13,659
1982	Thomas Rajan (ICS)	15,983
1987	V. N. Vasavan (CPI(M))	9,164
1991	V. N. Vasavan (CPI(M))	13,811
1996	Reji Zacharia (CPI(M))	10,155
2001	Cherian Philip (CPI(M) Ind.)	12,575
2006	Sindhu Joy (CPI(M))	19,863
2011	Suja Susan George (CPI(M))	33,255
2016	Jaik C. Thomas (CPI(M))	27,092
2021	Jaik C. Thomas (CPI(M))	9,044

== Positions held ==
=== Minister ===
Oommen Chandy was a minister in the Government of Kerala on four occasions. He was the minister for Labour from 11 April 1977 to 25 April 1977 in the first K. Karunakaran ministry and continued holding the same portfolio in the succeeding first A. K. Antony ministry until 27 October 1978. He was in the charge of Home Portfolio in the second K. Karunakaran ministry from 28 December 1981 to 17 March 1982. He was sworn in again as a minister in the fourth K. Karunakaran ministry on 2 July 1991. He was in charge of the Finance Portfolio and resigned from the cabinet on 22 June 1994 as a protest against Karunakaran's denial of a Rajya Sabha ticket to a factional leader.

Oommen Chandy was a minister in the following ministries:

No.	Head of the Ministry	Period	Portfolio
1	K. Karunakaran	11 April 1977 – 25 April 1977	Labour
2	A. K. Antony	27 April 1977 – 27 October 1978	Labour
3	K. Karunakaran	28 December 1981 – 17 March 1982	Home
4	K. Karunakaran	2 July 1991 – 22 June 1994	Finance

=== Chief minister of Kerala ===
==== First term as chief minister (2004–2006) ====
The results of the parliamentary elections in May 2004 saw the Indian National Congress not winning a single seat in Kerala. The sitting chief minister, A.K. Antony, was forced to resign and accept responsibility for the poor results. On 30 August 2004, Oommen was elected as the Congress Legislature Party leader at the end of a meeting by AICC observers and clearance by the Congress president, Sonia Gandhi. The Congress-led alliance was defeated but managed to retain 42 out of 140 seats in the assembly and boost its vote-share by nearly 10% after the general election rout. He resigned as chief minister on 12 May 2006 following the defeat of his party in 2006 Assembly Elections.

==== Second term as chief minister (2011–2016) ====
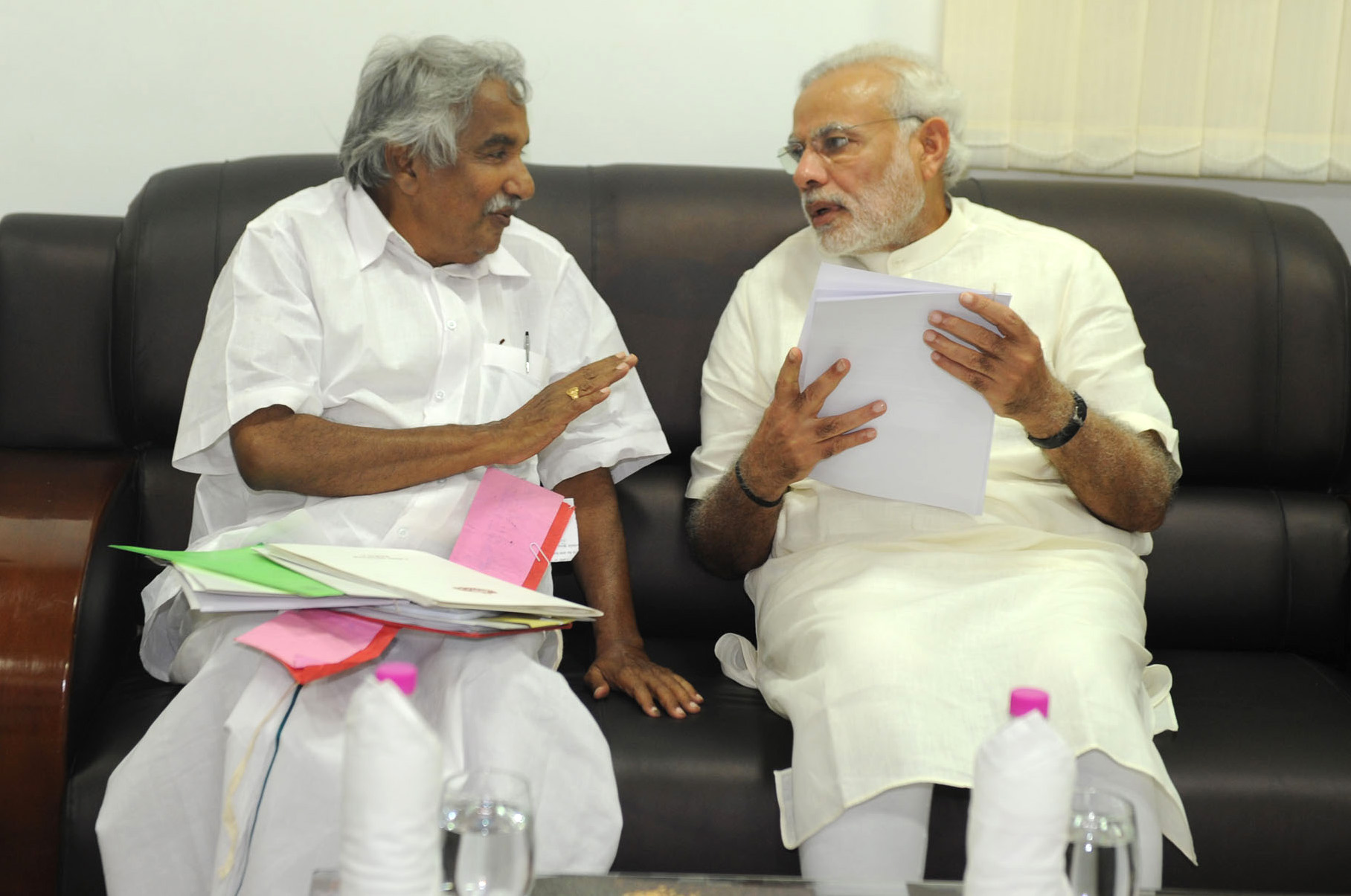
Oommen Chandy with Narendra Modi

UDF, led by Oommen Chandy, secured a slender margin of majority in the assembly election held on 13 April 2011 by winning 72 seats against the 68 seats of the LDF. He took the oath on 18 May 2011 with six other ministers of his cabinet. Later, thirteen other ministers were also inducted into his cabinet. During his second term as Chief Minister, Oommen Chandy held the portfolios of General Administration, Finance, Excise, Fisheries, Ports, Law and Housing, among others. He assumed the Excise, Fisheries and Ports portfolios following K. Babu's resignation and the Finance portfolio following Finance Minister K. M. Mani's resignation in 2015. In 2014, he transferred the Home and Vigilance portfolios to Ramesh Chennithala upon his induction into the cabinet.As his political party UDF (United Democratic Front) lose the election held on 16 May 2016,he filed his resignation on 20 May 2016.

=== Leader of Opposition ===
Oommen was the leader of opposition in the twelfth Kerala Legislative Assembly. Under his leadership, UDF marked victories in Lok Sabha Election 2009, gaining 16 out of 20 parliament constituencies in Kerala. UDF also got an upper hand in local body elections.

=== Leader of Congress Parliamentary Party ===
After winning the closely contested 2011 assembly election, Congress's legislative party unanimously elected Oommen as its leader.

== Awards and honours ==
Oommen Chandy received the 2013 United Nations Public Service Award for the Asia-Pacific region, for "Preventing and Combating Corruption in the Public Service." The award was presented on 27 June 2013, in Manama, Bahrain, by the UN Under-Secretary-General for Economic and Social Affairs, Wu Hongbo. The award was based on the theme "Transformative e-Government and Innovation: Creating a Better Future for All".

== Achievements ==
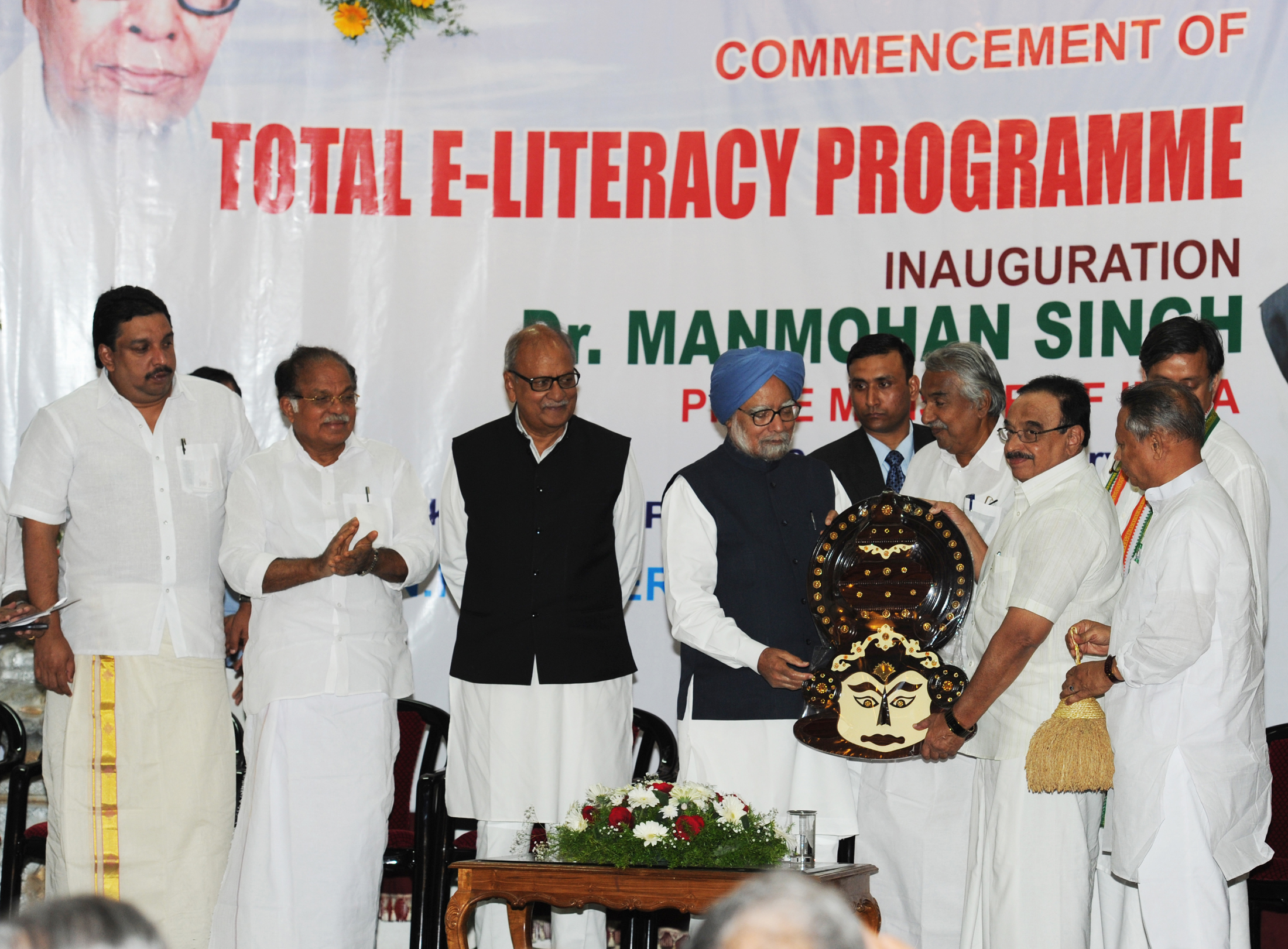
The inauguration of Complete E-literacy project at Thiruvananthapuram (2014)

Oommen Chandy first took charge as chief minister on 31 August 2004 and adopted the motto Athivegam Bahudooram (Fast and far). Sanctioning of unemployment allowance, and welfare measures for labourers were some of the measures introduced by his government. Oommen attended the 35th World Economic Forum held at Davos, Switzerland, in 2006. The Karunya benevolent scheme was implemented in 2011–2012, allowing free treatment of patients with cancer, haemophilia, and kidney and heart diseases. Forty-three Cochlear implant surgeries were performed under a Cochlear implant scheme for hearing impaired children. More organ implantation surgeries were done through Mruthasanjeevani project.

Oommen also received the United Nations' Public Service Award for his Mass Contact Programme (Jana Samparkka Paripadi), for hearing and solving the complaints of citizens. In 2005, Information Technology was made a compulsory subject for the school-level students, making Kerala the first Indian state to do so. Victers TV, which is India's first public edutainment channel broadband network on EDUSAT for schools, was inaugurated by A. P. J. Abdul Kalam on 28 July 2005 at Thiruvananthapuram.

The Hill highway project, a massive highway project that connects the eastern hilly areas of the districts of Kerala first proposed in 1960, was approved by the First Oommen ministry in 2005. The Government of Kerala approved the project and allocated funds on 17 January 2005, Oommen inaugurated the first phase of the project between Kasaragod and Palakkad at a function held in Payyavoor.

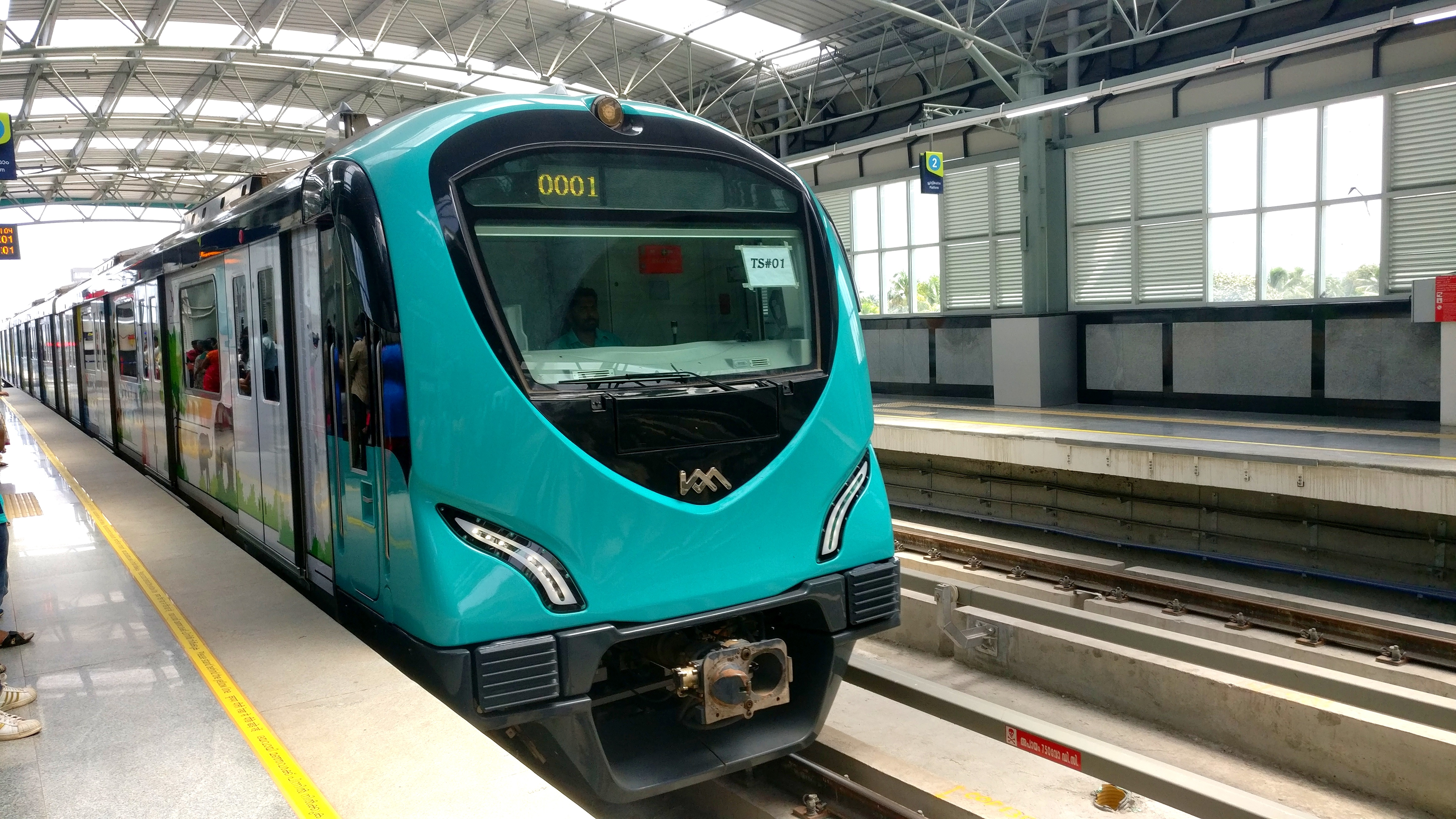
Kochi metro was the fastest completed metro project in India on its inauguration

The Second Oommen ministry (2011–2016) adopted the motto Vikasanavum Karuthalum (Development and Care). Oommen Chandy's regime was instrumental in beginning the construction of several massive infrastructure projects as well as some human-welfare schemes in Kerala which included the Kannur International Airport in Kannur, the Kochi Metro at Kochi, the Vizhinjam International Seaport at Thiruvananthapuram, and the Smart City project. The projects for Thiruvananthapuram Light Metro and Kozhikode Light Metro were approved in 2012. A suburban rail project was initiated in 2013.

The Technopark at Thiruvananthapuram became the largest Information Technology park in India with the inauguration of its third phase in 2014. The Taurus Downtown at Technopark was commenced during the period 2011–2016. The second phase of InfoPark, Kochi was inaugurated in May 2015. Phase two of InfoPark Thrissur was completed during the same period. The Park Centre of Cybercity at Kozhikode was formally opened by IT Minister P.K. Kunhalikutty on 15 February 2014. UL Cyberpark at Kozhikode was inaugurated in January 2016.

It was also during his administration that 12 new Taluks, 28 new Municipalities, and the Kannur Municipal Corporation were formed for more effective decentralisation and proper utilisation of resources in the state, It was the largest Taluk delimitation in the state of Kerala since 1957. A number of state highways were constructed under Oommen government, and the final decision to widen the national highways of the state to 45 metres (148 ft) were taken in 2014. During his tenure, 227 road bridges costing nearly Rs 1,600 crore were built across Kerala, the most ever in the state. The Kozhikode bypass was completed and the works of Kollam Bypass and Alappuzha Bypass roads were restarted during 2011–2016. The Karamana-Kaliyikkavila and Kazhakootam-Karode bypasses for the city of Thiruvananthapuram were initiated and started. The Kochi-Mangalore GAIL pipeline was commissioned by the Second Oommen ministry in 2013.

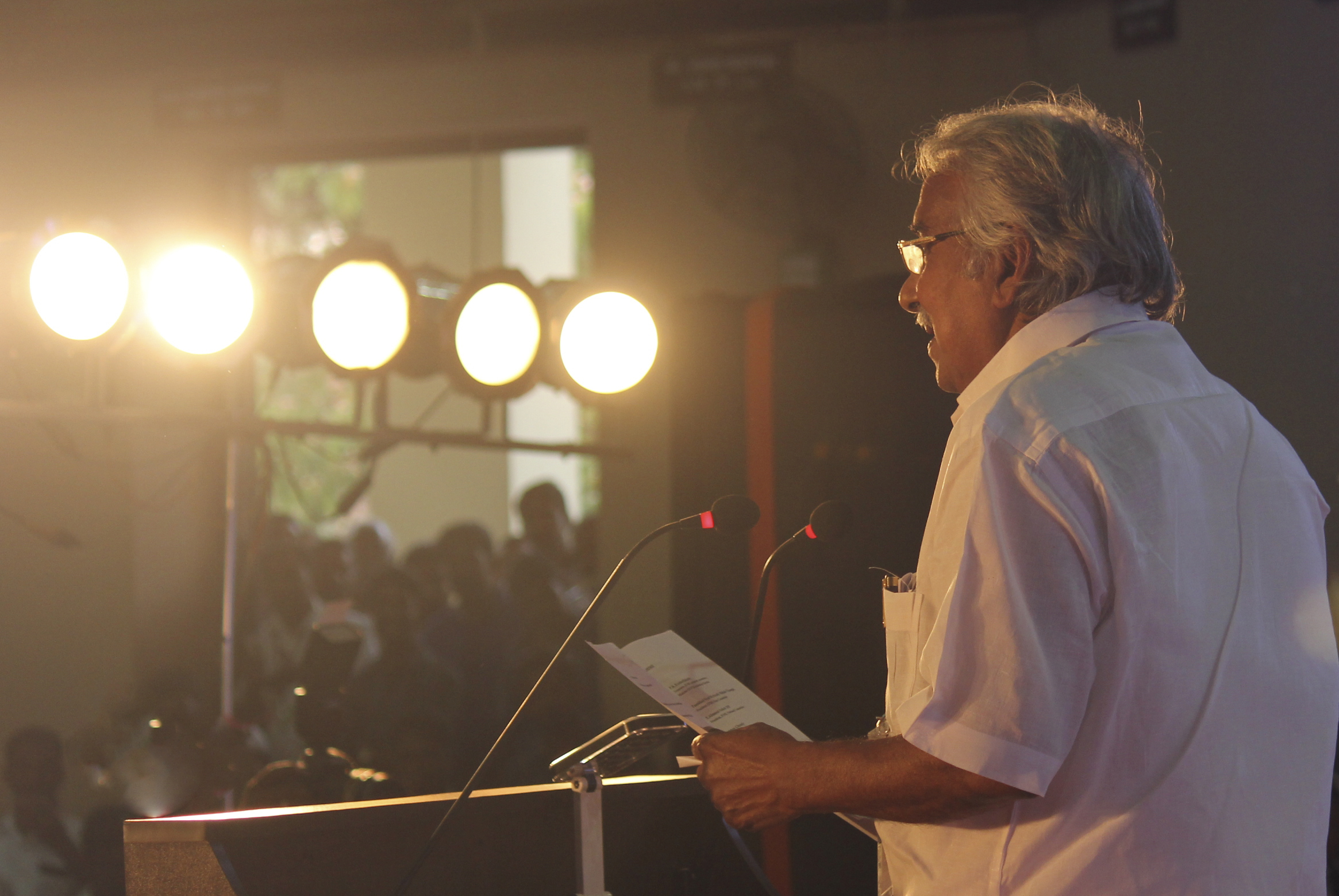
Oommen Chandy in September 2015

Oommen Chandy's administration also made the decision to build at least one government medical college in each district without one, to ensure the presence of the public medical college in all 14 districts of Kerala, which was instrumental in the public health infrastructure of the state. As a part of the project, new medical colleges were established in the state starting in 2013, after a gap of 31 years. The National University of Advanced Legal Studies at Kochi was founded in 2005 and the Indian Institute of Technology at Palakkad was established in 2015. The universities founded during 2011–2016 period include the Thunchath Ezhuthachan Malayalam University at Tirur (2012) and APJ Abdul Kalam Technological University at Thiruvananthapuram (2014). The K. R. Narayanan National Institute of Visual Science and Arts at Kottayam was inaugurated in January 2016. In 2015, the Cochin International Airport became the world's first fully solar-powered airport with the inauguration of a dedicated solar plant. The airport won the Champion of the Earth award in 2018, the highest environmental honour instituted by the United Nations. The airport was awarded The Best Airport in Asia-Pacific in 2020 (with 5–15 million passengers per annum) by the Airports Council International. The Kerala Urban Road Transport Corporation (KURTC) was formed under KSRTC in 2015 to manage affairs related to urban transportation. It was inaugurated on 12 April 2015 at Thevara. Works on the last phase of Kollam Bypass was started on 27 May 2015.

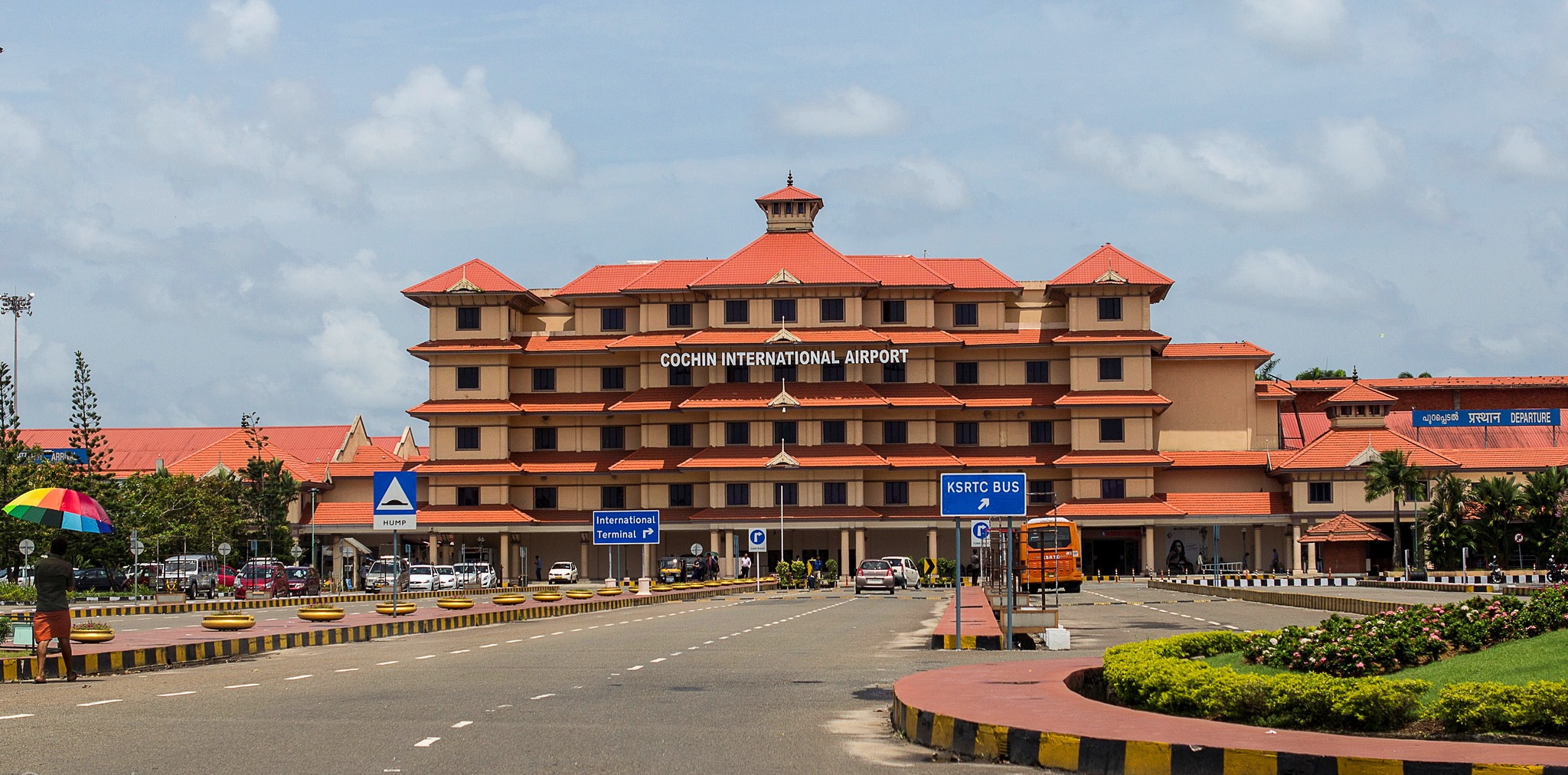
Cochin International Airport is the first airport in the world to be fully powered by solar energy

Social welfare pensions were doubled during Oommen Chandy's second ministry, increasing to Rs.600. The government distributed pensions ranging from Rs 800 – Rs 1,500. Social welfare pensions which had been distributed to 12.9 lakh people until 2011 were extended to 34.43 lakh during 2011–2016. Pensions for the disabled and widows were increased to Rs 800. Old-age pensions were increased to Rs 1,500 for those above 75 years and Rs 1,100 to those above 80 years. Other social welfare measures included free rations for those who lost their employment, and 4,14,552 houses for those who hadn't homes before. Free rice was given to those who were below the poverty line. Food kits were distributed during Onam, Ramdan, and Christmas. A rubber Subsidy to ensure a minimum price of Rs 150/kg was implemented in 2015. The Kerala Public Service Commission filled vacant posts during 2011–2016, appointing as many as 1,67,096 job candidates, setting a record; 46,223 posts were created in the same period. The second Oommen ministry had also made the decision to prohibit liqueur in the state by discouraging bars. The number of political killings were relatively low (eleven) during 2011–2016. Kerala was declared as the first complete digital state of India on 27 February 2016.

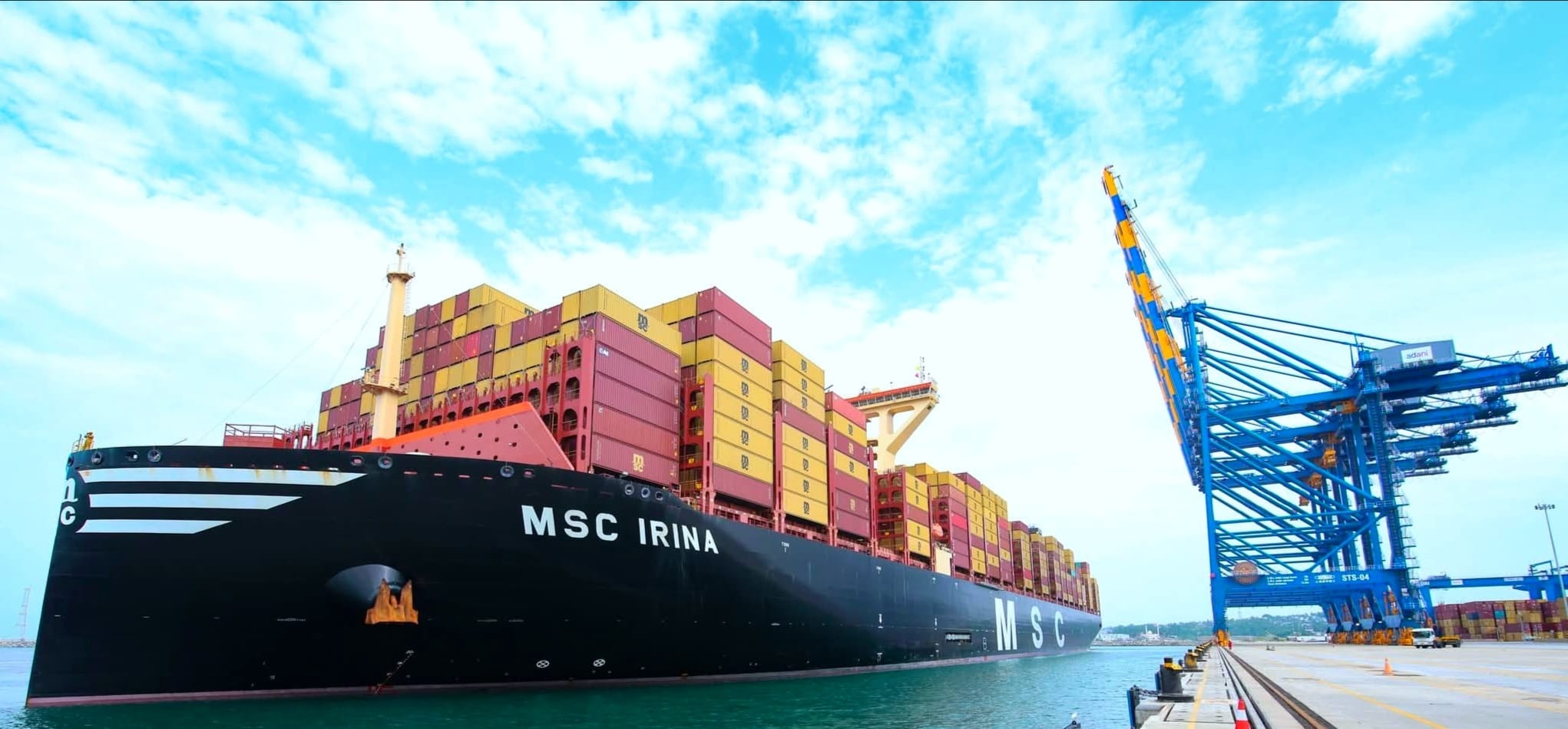
MSC Irina at Vizhinjam International Seaport Thiruvananthapuram

Twenty-six sectors were identified for showcasing in the Emerging Kerala summit of 2012 held at Kochi. The event was organised by the Kerala State Industrial Development Corporation (KSIDC), to highlight investment opportunities available in Kerala and advertise to the world its state of readiness to receive investors. Prime Minister of India Dr. Manmohan Singh inaugurated the three-day event. Goals for the event included bringing in 45 specific project proposals with an investment of over Rs.40,000 crore, including Bharat Petroleum Corporation Ltd's Kochi Refinery expansion and another joint venture project of Rs.18,000 crore, Volkswagen's engine assembly unit (Rs.2,000 crore), a hospital and pre-cast concrete structure manufacturing unit (Rs.570 crore), and a solar energy plant (Rs.500crore). A number of projects were conceptualised and developed in the tate following the summit, the most prominent of which included the Kochi-Mangalore GAIL Pipeline, Vizhinjam International Seaport, Kochi Metro, Thiruvananthapuram Light Metro and Kozhikode Light Metro, Petroleum Chemicals & Petrochemical Investment Region, Kochi-Palakkad National Investment and Manufacturing Zone, Indian Institute of Information Technology, Kottayam, Thiruvananthapuram–Kasargode Semi High Speed Rail Corridor, Kerala Seaplane, Electronic hub at Kochi, Titanium Sponge Plant Project at Kollam, Oceanarium project at Kochi, Bio 360 Life Sciences Park at Thiruvananthapuram, a gas-based powerplant at Cheemeni, Kasaragod, and Kochi LNG Terminal.

== Controversies ==
=== 2013 Kerala solar panel scam ===
The 2013 Kerala solar panel scam was one of the main scandals raised by the LDF-led opposition. It was also one of the main election issues used by LDF during 2016 Kerala Legislative Assembly election.

However, the Crime Branch appointed by First Vijayan ministry in 2018 found that there was no evidence against Oommen in the scam. As part of the procedures, the state home secretary T. K. Jose had forwarded a report to the central government. According to the report, no evidence could be collected against Oommen Chandy and the Crime Branch failed to confirm that the incident mentioned in the complaint actually happened. The case was handed over to the central agency after several teams of the Kerala Police repeatedly failed to prove the allegations against Oommen.

=== Vizhinjam Port corruption accusation ===
The opposition led by CPI(M) had accused corruption in the Vizhinjam International Seaport project ahead of the 2016 Kerala Legislative Assembly election.

The Comptroller and Auditor General (CAG) of India, in its report on Public Sector Undertakings for the financial year ending March 2016, presented to the Kerala state assembly, identified irregularities in the agreement executed by the then state government. The CAG report contended that by granting a ten-year concession period beyond the standard thirty-year term for Public-Private Partnership (PPP) projects, the state government's agreement with the Adani Group for the Vizhinjam seaport project could potentially result in an additional revenue of Rs 29,217 crore for the concessionaire. This figure was calculated based on revenue projections outlined in the Feasibility Report prepared by Ernst and Young. Based on this CAG report, the first Vijayan ministry appointed a three-member judicial commission under Justice C. N. Ramachandran to investigate in May 2017.

In 2018, the commission concluded that there was no corruption with the state's project and that there was no misuse of political power in the port project. The commission report stated that there was no evidence to prove there was corruption. C. N. Ramachandran said that "Nobody came forward with any specific corruption charges against any individual and nobody ventured to give any evidence. When there is no allegation of corruption against anyone, there is no need to investigate corruption against anyone. That is why the commission has not found corruption against anyone." cbi enquired about it. There was nothing happened in enquiry.

=== Pattoor land case ===
The Pattoor Land Case was used by the LDF-led opposition ahead of 2016 Kerala Legislative Assembly election. In February 2018, the Kerala High Court pointed out that the Vigilance and Anti-Corruption Bureau (VACB) registered the first information report based on the wrong report prepared by Jacob Thomas. The court said that the claim that the property vests with Kerala Water Authority was not based on any document. As the High Court rejected the case, the UDF government got a clean chit. The High Court found that neither Oommen nor the UDF government was involved in any corruption.

=== Palmolein oil import scam ===
The Palmolein Oil import scam (1991–1992) refers to the alleged irregularities in the import of palmolein by the K. Karunakaran-led United Democratic Front government of the state of Kerala, India through the Power and Energy Limited Company. It was accused by the LDF-led opposition in 1992. However, a 2011 VACB probe found that Oommen, finance minister during 1991–1996, had no role in the corruption. The report filed by VACB said that Oommen Chandy was not aware of the details of the decision to import palmolein through a Singapore-based firm.

== Death and funeral ==
=== Death ===
Oommen Chandy was diagnosed with throat cancer. He commenced immunotherapy treatment at HCG Cancer Centre in Bengaluru in December 2022. Additionally, he underwent laser biopsy in Germany, a procedure that reduces tumor size but does not eliminate cancer. Despite these treatments, Oommen succumbed to the disease and died on 18 July 2023 at the age of 79 due to complications from throat cancer. He died at the Chinmaya Mission Hospital in Bengaluru.

=== Funeral procession ===
Following his death, Oommen's body was transported to Thiruvananthapuram via chartered flight for public homage, first at the Durbar Hall, Thiruvananthapuram and subsequently at the Kerala Pradesh Congress Committee (KPCC) office. The Government of Kerala declared a public holiday on 18 July 2023 and a two-day state mourning in his honour. A solemn funeral procession began on 19 July 2023, traversing the 150 km distance from the state capital to Oommen's hometown, Puthuppally in Kottayam district. A journey that typically takes five hours was extended to approximately 30 hours due to the immense public outpouring of grief. Thousands of people lined the route to bid their final farewells to him.

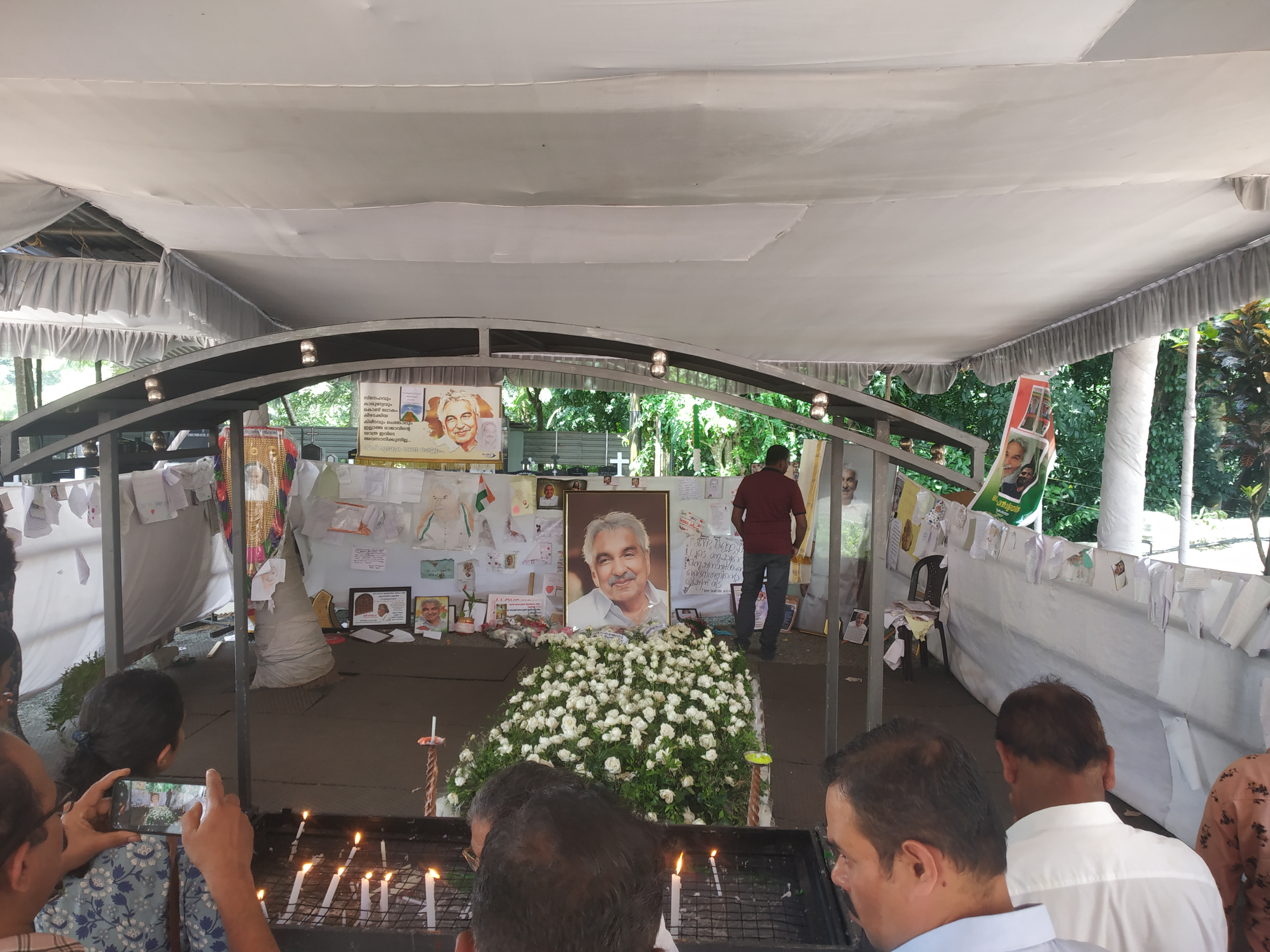
Burial site of Oommen Chandy

The final rites were conducted at St. George Orthodox Church, Puthuppally, on 20 July 2023, presided over by Mar Baselios Marthoma Mathews III. As an honour for his public service, Oommen Chandy was laid to rest in a specially constructed tomb within the exclusive burial ground reserved for the Orthodox Church's clergy. Respecting his wishes, the family declined state honours, with his son expressing his father's desire for a simple funeral.

== Legacy ==
After Oommen Chandy's death, his son, Chandy Oommen, contested and won in the by-election.

KPCC President K Sudhakaran has said that Vizhinjam port should be named after Oommen Chandy since the port became a reality only due to his efforts.

The 2026 Malayalam movie, Prathichaya, directed by B Unnikrishnan and starring Balachandra Menon and Nivin Pauly is loosely based on the life of Oommen Chandy.

== Sources ==
- Chandran, VP (2018). Mathrubhumi Yearbook Plus – 2019 (Malayalam ed.). Kozhikode: P. V. Chandran, Managing Editor, Mathrubhumi Printing & Publishing Company, Kozhikode.

Political offices
Preceded by A. K. Antony	Chief Minister of Kerala; 31 August 2004 – 18 May 2006	Succeeded by V. S. Achuthanandan
Preceded by V. S. Achuthanandan	Chief Minister of Kerala; 18 May 2011 – 20 May 2016	Succeeded by Pinarayi Vijayan
