= Emerging Kerala =

Economy of Kerala

- "Come. Experience. And be part of it"
- Host country: India
- Date: 12–14 September 2012
- Cities: Kochi, Kerala
- Venues: Le Méridien, Kochi
- Chair: Government of Kerala
- Website: www.emergingkerala2012.org

Emerging Kerala is a biennial investors' summit organized by the Government of Kerala, India. The event brings together business leaders, investors, corporations, policy makers, and thought leaders. The summit serves as a platform to discuss and explore business opportunities in Kerala.

== Investment options ==
Twenty-six sectors have been identified and the following project profiles have been prepared by various departments, PSUs & other agencies for showcasing in 'Emerging Kerala 2012'

- Tourism
- Healthcare services
- Manufacturing including Engineering & Automotive
- Projects under MSME Sector
- IT / ITES / IT Infrastructure
- Science & Technology
- Trade & Retailing
- Food & Agro Processing and Value-addition
- Ports, Shipbuilding
- Textiles & Garments
- Electronics
- Knowledge / Education sector
- Green Energy
- Bio-Technology, Nano Technology, Pharmaceuticals
- Urban Infrastructure Development
- Infotainment
- Logistics
- Petrochemicals
- Gas based Industries
- Airport Infrastructure, Airplane and Helicopter services
- Centers of Excellence
- Infrastructure development (Road, Rail, Power, Water Supply, Sewage)

== Emerging Kerala Global Connect 2012 ==
The first Emerging Kerala summit took place from 12 to 14 September 2012 at the Le Meridien International Convention Centre in Kochi. The event was organized by the Kerala State Industrial Development Corporation (KSIDC) to showcase investment opportunities in Kerala and demonstrate the state's readiness to attract investors. Various programs were held in connection with the summit. The Hon'ble Prime Minister of India Dr. Manmohan Singh inaugurated the three-day event. These include:

- Business meets
- Sectoral conclaves;
- Domestic and international road-shows
- Discussion and debates

Besides the inaugural session, the first Global connect had

- Plenary Sessions
- Sectoral presentations;
- Round tables.
- Business to Business (B2B) connects;
- Business to Government (B2G) connects.
- Cultural performances

The event and its related programs received support from the Government of Kerala and the Kerala State Industrial Development Corporation (KSIDC), as well as various trade and industrial organizations. The Confederation of Indian Industry (CII) and the National Association of Software and Services Companies (NASSCOM) were the event partners.

=== Results of the Summit ===
The meeting resulted in 45 project proposals, with an investment exceeding Rs. 40,000 crore. Notable projects include the expansion of Bharat Petroleum Corporation Ltd.'s Kochi Refinery and a joint venture worth Rs. 18,000 crore, Volkswagen's engine assembly unit (Rs. 2,000 crore), a hospital and pre-cast concrete structure manufacturing unit (Rs. 570 crore), and a solar energy plant (Rs. 500 crore).

The Confederation of Indian Industry (CII) announced the establishment of a Centre of Excellence in Entrepreneurship in Kerala. During a meeting, 43 business proposals were discussed involving various departments of the State and companies from the United Kingdom, United States, Japan, and Canada.

The Government of Kerala will set up the Kerala State Investment Board to expedite the approval process for proposals. Amendments will be made to the Single-Window Clearance Act, including transitioning to an online application system.

The Kerala Industrial Infrastructure Development Corporation (KINFRA) will develop one lakh square feet of built-up space in 16 months for incubators, with the first phase of 25,000 square feet scheduled for completion by May 2013. This project aims to establish the world's largest telecom incubator. Additionally, the State government plans to strengthen the entrepreneurial ecosystem by creating a Technology Innovation Zone on 10 acres in Kochi, with an initial investment of Rs. 100 crore.

== Mega projects ==
A number of Mega projects are being conceptualized and developed in the State, the most prominent of which are as follows:

Color key

- : The project has been completed
- : The project is under-development
- : The project is in the planning stages
- : The project has been proposed
- : The project has been delayed or indefinitely postponed
- : The project has been halted/abandoned

=== Projects by year ===
==== 2026 ====
Project Title	Location	Industry	Ownership	Expected Completion	Current status
World Trade Center (WTC Learning Park)	Kozhikode (Poovangal)	Convention and Exhibition Centre	Private	March 2026	Under-development
Kerala High-Speed Rail (KHSR)	Thiruvananthapuram to Kannur	Transportation	Central/State PSU	2033	Proposed

==== 2025 ====
Project Title	Location	Industry	Ownership	Expected Completion	Current status
IT Parks	Kannur (Mattannur)	IT Infrastructure	State Government	Not specified	Proposed
IT Parks	Kollam (Kottarakkara)	IT Infrastructure	State Government	Not specified	Proposed
IT Parks	Kollam (Kureepuzha)	IT Infrastructure	State Government	Not specified	Proposed
Science Park	Kannur (Paduvilayi)	IT Infrastructure	State Government	December 2033	In the planning stages
Science Park	Ernakulam (Kochi)	IT Infrastructure	State Government	Not specified	In the planning stages
Science Park	Thiruvananthapuram	IT Infrastructure	State Government	Not specified	In the planning stages
Kochi Refinery Expansion	Ernakulam (Thiruvaniyoor)	Petroleum	Central PSU	March 2029	Under-development
Sea Port	Kannur (Azhikode)	Infrastructure	State Government	March 2030	Proposed
Biomedical Waste Treatment Facility	Pathanamthitta (Enadimangalam)	Environment	Central Government	Not specified	In the planning stages
Industrial Corridor Development	Palakkad (Pudussery Central, Kannambra)	Infrastructure	State PSU	Not specified	In the planning stages

==== 2024 ====
Project Title	Location	Industry	Ownership	Expected Completion	Current status
CIAL International Terminal Building Expansion	Ernakulam (Nedumbassery)	Airports & Aviation	Central Government	October 2026	In the planning stages
Small Hydro Electric Project	Thrissur (Peringalkuthu Dam)	Power Generation	State PSU	May 2028	In the planning stages
Integrated Green Hydrogen Plant	Ernakulam (Nedumbassery)	Petroleum	State PSU	Not specified	Under-development

=== Other Maga Projects ===
No.	Project Title	Proposed Year	Expected Completion	Project Details	Current status
1	Supplementary Gas Infrastructure Project	2015	Not specified	A joint venture company, Kerala Gail Gas Limited (KGGL), has been established between the KSIDC and GAIL Gas Limited. KGGL will undertake activities such as city gas distribution in Kerala, the establishment of CNG stations for KSRTC buses, a gas training institute, and spur lines from GAIL's main pipeline. Additionally, the company will set up small gas-based power generating plants. The total estimated investment for the project is ₹2,000 crores ($400 million).	Delayed/Indefinitely Postponed
2	Vizhinjam International Deepwater Multipurpose Seaport	2015	2024	The Vizhinjam International Deepwater Multipurpose Seaport is an ambitious project of the Government of Kerala, being developed at Vizhinjam in Thiruvananthapuram. The project adheres to the Landlord Port Model, wherein dredging, reclamation, and essential infrastructure such as breakwaters and quays will be undertaken by Vizhinjam International Seaport Ltd., a wholly owned subsidiary of the Government of Kerala. Port operations will be managed through a public-private partnership (PPP) model. A private operator will construct, operate, and maintain the terminal superstructure for a period of 30 years. The port development, along with its supporting infrastructure, is planned in phases, with an estimated cumulative cost of ₹7000 Crores ($1.4 billion). Upon completion, the port will offer a total quay length of 2000 meters across three phases, primarily catering to container transshipment, while also accommodating other cargo types like multi-purpose and break bulk goods.	Completed
3	Digital Science Park Phase IV	2018	Not specified	The Digital Science Park under construction in Thiruvananthapuram, will be India's first digital science park. Announced in the 2022-23 state budget, the Government of Kerala allocated ₹1000 crore for the development of four science parks to leverage advancements in science and technology. The first of these parks is being established near the Digital University of Kerala in Technopark Phase IV, Technocity. Prime Minister Narendra Modi laid the foundation stone for the park on April 25, 2023.	Under-development
4	Kochi Metro Rail Project	2012	2024 (Delayed)	The project envisions constructing a world-class Light Mass Rapid Transit (LMRTS) system in Kochi to enhance the quality of life in the Greater Kochi metropolitan area. By improving regional connectivity and reducing overcrowding, traffic congestion, travel time, air, and noise pollution, the project aims to significantly uplift the region. Spanning a total of 25 kilometers, the LMRTS will feature 21 stations from Aluva to Pettah. The proposed construction method involves an elevated viaduct supported by pre-stressed concrete U-shaped girders. To execute this project, a Special Purpose Vehicle (SPV) named Kochi Metro Rail Limited has been established. The estimated project cost is ₹4500 crores ($900 million).	Under-development
4	Monorail Project in Thiruvananthapuram	2012	Not specified	This is a prestigious single-rail mass transit project of the Government of Kerala, spanning a 28.4-kilometer route between Kazhakoottam and Balaramapuram in Thiruvananthapuram district. A monorail is a rail-based transportation system supported and guided by a single rail. This monorail will be elevated on a track along the median of the main road, minimizing land acquisition as only junctions require widening. Each train will consist of four cars, accommodating over 200 passengers, and will travel at a safe speed of 40 kilometers per hour. The estimated total project cost is ₹3408 Crores ($682 million). A detailed traffic study is being conducted by the National Transportation Planning & Research Centre (NATPAC).	Delayed/Indefinitely Postponed
5	Kozhikode Light Metro	2021	Not specified	The Kozhikode Light Metro Project is a proposed Light Rail Transit (LRT) system comprising a single line with 14 stations. The 13.3-kilometer first phase of the project is currently underway and is being overseen by the Kerala Rapid Transit Corporation Limited (KRTL). Despite facing numerous setbacks due to security and budgetary challenges, the estimated ₹2,773 crore (US$347 million) project is anticipated to be completed by 2026. Upon completion, the Light Metro is expected to significantly alleviate traffic congestion and improve commuting conditions for residents.	Delayed/Indefinitely Postponed
6	Kochi GIFT City	2017	Not specified	The proposed GIFT City, Kochi, is a global financial and trade hub under development on a 220-hectare site at Ayyampuzha, near Aluva in Ernakulam district. This early-bird project is part of the Kochi-Bengaluru Industrial Corridor (KBIC). A joint venture between the state and central governments, the project is anticipated to create over 50,000 jobs upon completion. Land acquisition is currently underway. Beyond attracting prominent companies, it is expected to generate approximately ₹1 lakh crore in investments. The project is slated for completion by 2025, aiming to become a prominent IT and trade hub.	In the planning stages
7	Air Kerala airlines	2014	2025	It is a proposed airline project, promoted by the Government of Kerala, registered as a subsidiary of the Cochin International Airport Limited (CIAL). In March 2015, the board of directors of the airline decided to defer the start of commercial operations until a clear picture of relevant government rules emerged. In July 2024, Afi Ahmed's private company, Zettfly Aviation, announced that they had received a No Objection Certificate (NOC) from the Ministry of Civil Aviation to operate scheduled commuter air transport services for three years. Zettfly plans to use Ahmed's Air Kerala domain name to market their services. It would be the first regional airline to be based in Kerala. Zettfly is working to obtain an Air Operator's Certificate (AOC) and will start operations with three ATR 72-600 aircraft. Being set up as an "ultra low-cost airline", Ahmed plans to start out with three ATR 72-600 aircraft and grow its fleet to 20 for international expansion.	Under-development
8	Palakkad Industrial Smart City	2024	Not specified	The Union Cabinet approved the Palakkad industrial city, part of a 12-city initiative under the National Industrial Corridor Development program. The city will be built on 1,710 acres, with an estimated investment of ₹28,602 crore. Palakkad is a key component of the Kochi-Bengaluru industrial corridor, expected to attract ₹10,000 crore in Kerala. The Government of Kerala acquired 82% of the land in 2022. The project received approvals from the National Industrial Corridor Trust Board and the Environment Ministry. A special purpose vehicle, Kerala Industrial Corridor Development Corporation, has been formed. Once the master plan and detailed project report are finalized, the tendering process will begin.	In the planning stages
9	Kerala Nuclear Power Station	2024	Not specified	The central government has expressed readiness to approve a nuclear power plant project in Kerala, provided that the state secures the necessary land. Cheemeni in Kasaragod district has been suggested as a potential site. The Kerala State Electricity Board (KSEB) has highlighted the need to generate 10,000 MW of electricity to meet the state's growing power requirements. The proposed nuclear power plant is part of this plan to strengthen Kerala's energy infrastructure. There have also been talks about utilizing thorium-based nuclear technology for the project.	In the planning stages

=== Other projects ===
No.	Project Title	Proposed Year	Proposed Location	Current status
1	Petroleum Chemicals & Petrochemical Investment Region (PCPIR)	2013	Kochi and Coimbatore	Delayed/Indefinitely Postponed
2	Kochi-Palakkad National Investment and Manufacturing Zone (NIMZ)	2014	Palakkad and Kochi	In the planning stages
3	Indian Institute of Information Technology, Kottayam (IIIT)	2014	Kottayam	Completed
4	Electronic Hub at Kochi	2012	Kochi	In the planning stages
5	Titanium Sponge Plant Project	2010	Chavara, Kollam	Completed
6	Oceanarium Project	2011	Puthuvype, Kochi	Halted
7	Gas Based Power Project	2012	Cheemeni, Kasargode	Delayed/Indefinitely Postponed

== Updates mega projects in Kerala ==
Trouism in Kerala
Project	Location	Status
Jatayu Earth's Center Nature Park	Chadayamangalam	Completed
Vagamon Glass Bridge	Vagamon	Completed

World Class Station
Project	Location	Status
Ernakulam Junction railway station	Ernakulam	Under-development
Kollam Junction railway station	Kollam	Under-development
Thiruvananthapuram railway station	Thiruvananthapuram	Proposed
Thrissur railway station	Thrissur	In the planning stages

Tunnel
Project	Location	Status
Kuthiran Tunnel	Kunthiran	Completed

Airport
Project	Location	Status
Kannur international airport	Kannur	Completed
Sabarimala Greenfield Airport	Manimala & Erumely, Kottayam District	Proposed
Bekal Airport	Bekal	Proposed
Thiruvambady Airport	Thiruvambady	Proposed
Palakkad Green Field International Airport	Palakkad	Feasibility study
Kerala seaplanee	Kochi	Completed

Frrey
Project	Location	Status	Notes
Kochi Water Metro	Kochi	Completed	The construction work started in 2016 and its first route between Vyttila and InfoPark was inaugurated in February 2021 by Chief Minister Pinarayi Vijayan. It was officially inaugurated and opened to passengers by Prime Minister Narendra Modi on 25 April 2023. Kochi Water Metro is expected to become fully operational by 2035 with a daily commuter-count of 1.5 lakh passengers. It is also described as possibly the largest electric boat metro transportation infrastructure being implemented in the world.

Semi high speed in kerala
Project	Location	Time	Status	Notes
Vanda Bharat express	Kasaragod–Thiruvananthapuram Vande Bharat Express (via Kottayam)	08hrs 5mins	Completed	India's 15th Vande Bharat Express train, connecting Kasaragod with state capital Thiruvananthapuram in Kerala. The train service was officially inaugurated on 25 April 2023 by Prime Minister Narendra Modi at Thiruvananthapuram Central. As of July 2023, it is the best-performing Vande Bharat Express train service with an average occupancy of 183 per cent, according to official data.
Vanda Bharat express	Kasaragod–Thiruvananthapuram Vande Bharat Express (via Alappuzha)	07hrs 55mins	Completed	India's 33rd Vande Bharat Express train, connecting Kasaragod with state capital Thiruvananthapuram in Kerala. It is the second Vande Bharat Express in Kerala as well as India's first saffron coloured semi-high speed train. The service was inaugurated on 24 September 2023 by Prime Minister Narendra Modi via video conference from New Delhi.
Silver Line (K-Rail)	Kasaragod- Thiruvananthapuram	4 hrs	Delayed/Indefinitely Postponed	Proposed higher-speed rail line in India that would connect Thiruvananthapuram, the capital city, and Kasaragod of Kerala state.Thiruvananthapuram, Kollam, Chengannur, Kottayam, Kochi, Thrissur, Tirur, Kozhikode, Kannur and Kasaragod will be the stations in this corridor.

Railway line
Project	Location	Note	Status
Nilambur-Nanjangud line	Nanjangud (Karnataka) to Nilambur (Kerala) through Wayanad district of Kerala and Nilgiri district of Tamil Nadu.	Railways have reportedly made the move following the intervention of technocrat E. Sreedharan who had certified the viability of the proposed line from Nilambur to Mysuru.	Proposed
Sabarimala Railway	Angamaly (Ernakulam district) Erumeli(Kottayam district)	Sabarimala Railway is a proposed 111-kilometre (69 mi)-long railway line in Kerala, India, that will run from Angamaly to Erumeli. It was sanctioned in 1998 by Indian Railways. The line's name comes from the fact that it will provide a railway facility to pilgrims visiting the Sabarimala Temple (which number more than the total population of Kerala).	Delayed/Indefinitely Postponed

Urban Rapid in Kerala
Project	Location	Type	Phase(s)	Status
Kochi metro	Kochi	Rapid transit	Phase l - 25	Completed
Kochi metro	Kochi	Rapid transit	Phase II – 11 station	Under-development
Kochi metro	Kochi	Rapid transit	Phase III– station 14	Proposed
Thiruvananthapuram light metro	Thiruvananthapuram	light rapid transit	Phase I – 19 station	Delayed/Indefinitely Postponed
Kozhikode light metro	Kozhikode	Light rapid transit	Phase I – 22 station	Delayed/Indefinitely Postponed

== Permanently Halted/Abandoned Projects ==
The following are major infrastructure projects that have been permanently suspended or abandoned due to a combination of environmental, financial, and administrative challenges, resulting in delays or complete termination.

No.	Project Title	Location (District)	Reason for Halting
1	Aranmula International Airport	Pathanamthitta	Proposed in Aranmula, this private airport project faced strong opposition from local residents and environmentalists. The airport was to be located on land that was believed to be ecologically fragile, and the Kerala High Court later ruled in favour of the opposition, leading to the project's permanent cancellation.
2	Hydro Power Projects in Silent Valley	Palakkad	The Silent Valley Hydroelectric Project, which was proposed in the 1970s, was permanently shelved following widespread protests by environmental activists and local communities. The project was believed to be a major threat to the biodiversity of the Silent Valley forest, part of the Western Ghats.
3	Athirappilly Hydroelectric Project	Thrissur	The Athirappilly hydroelectric project was halted after widespread protests from environmental groups and local communities. The project would have affected the biodiversity-rich region near the Athirappilly waterfalls, and concerns about environmental destruction and displacement led to its cancellation.
4	Vizhinjam Mother and Child Hospital	Thiruvananthapuram	The construction of a mother and child hospital in Vizhinjam, was halted midway due to issues in project management, budget overruns, and bureaucratic delays. While initially approved to provide healthcare facilities to underserved areas, it remains unfinished due to administrative hurdles.
5	Gas-Based Power Plant	Thiruvananthapuram	Proposed to provide cleaner energy, this gas-based power plant in Thiruvananthapuram was halted after initial planning due to concerns over fuel availability and environmental clearances.
6	Karapuzha Irrigation Project	Wayanad	This irrigation project was initiated to help farmers in the Wayanad region but has faced multiple delays due to budget overruns and environmental concerns. The project remains unfinished despite being planned decades ago.
7	Kannur Aerotropolis	Kannur	The Kannur Aerotropolis, envisioned as an airport city with industrial and commercial hubs, remains stalled due to land acquisition disputes and insufficient private sector interest. The project was meant to boost economic activity in the Kannur region but is currently in limbo.
8	Kerala Seaplane	Kollam	The Kerala Seaplane project, initially met with mixed reactions, faced significant setbacks. Protests from fishing communities over concerns about livelihood and the environment forced the project to relocate. Despite efforts to gain community support, the project was ultimately abandoned due to operational challenges and mounting losses. The aircraft remained grounded, and the government's expert committee was unable to complete its assessment.
9	Silver Line (K-Rail)	Thiruvananthapuram to Kasaragod	The Silver Line was a proposed higher-speed rail line in India that would connect Thiruvananthapuram, the state capital, with Kasaragod in Kerala. With an operating speed of 200 kilometers per hour (120 mph) and a maximum design speed of 220 kmph (55 mps), structures being engineered for 250 kmph (69.5 mps), the line would reduce travel time between the two cities to less than four hours, compared to the current 10 to 12 hours. The proposed stations along the 532-kilometer (331-mile) corridor include Thiruvananthapuram, Kollam, Chengannur, Kottayam, Ernakulam, Thrissur, Tirur, Kozhikode, Kannur, and Kasaragod. The project is permanently shelved.

== See also ==
- Second Chandy ministry
- Invest Kerala Global Summit
- Government of Kerala
- KSIDC
- List of megaprojects in India
