= Podippalam =

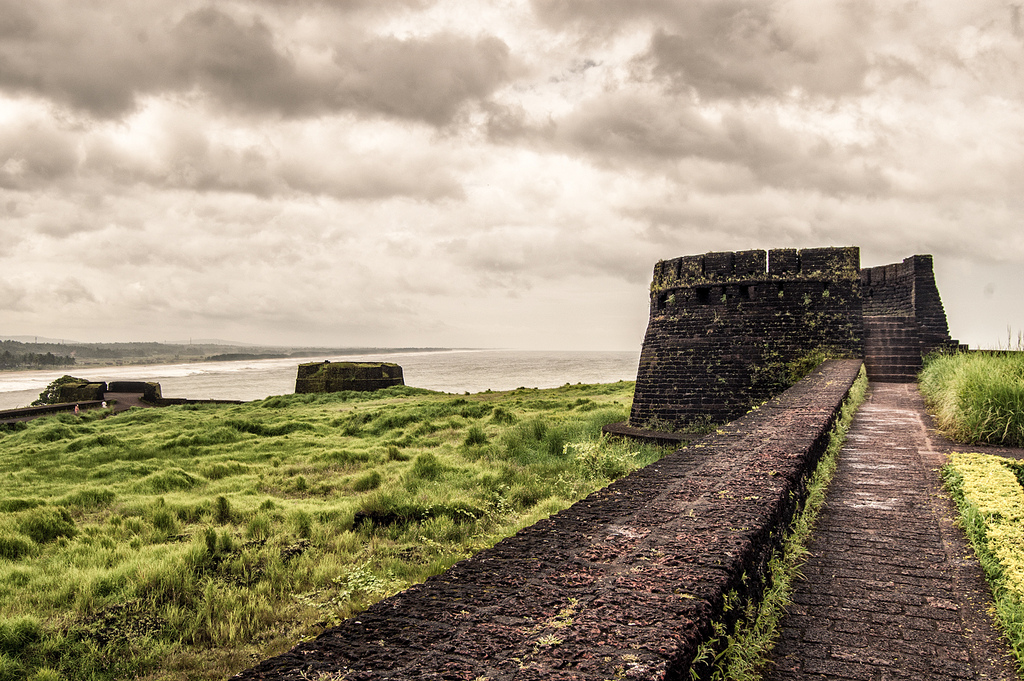
Just 5 km from podippalam to bekal fort

Podippalam is a village in Kasaragod district in the state of Kerala, India.

== Location ==
It is situated approximately six km inland from the coastal town of Bekal. Podippalam is around 17 km by road from Kasaragod and around 16 km from Kanhangad.

== Education ==
Sri Mahalingeshwara Aided Upper Primary School and the Sri Mahalingeshwara Shiva temple are located near by podippalam Village.

== Temples ==
Panayal kottappara sree Vayanattu kulavan dhevasthanm located here.

== Transport ==
Local roads have access to NH.66 which connects to Mangalore in the north and Calicut in the south. The nearest railway station is Kanhangad on Mangalore-Palakkad line. There are airports at Mangalore and Calicut.

Coordinates: 12°24'53"N 75°3'5"E
