= Cherumba =

Village in Kerala, India

Cherumba is a village in Kasaragod district, Kerala, India, situated approximately 6 km inland from the coastal town of Bekal. It hosts Cherumba Rifahiyya Juma masjid, Cherumba Parotiyadukkam (C.P ) is the prominent family in this place
