= Kerala Seaplane =

Indian commercial seaplane service

- Founded: 2 June 2013
- Commenced operations: August 2013 / 11 November 2024
- Operating bases: Trivandrum International Airport; Cochin International Airport; Calicut International Airport; Mangalore International Airport
- Parent company: Kerala Tourism Development Corporation
- Headquarters: Kerala, India
- Website: keralaseaplane.com

Kerala Seaplane is a commercial seaplane service operated by Kerala Tourism Infrastructure Limited in the Indian state of Kerala. It was first launched on June 2, 2013, in Kollam, with an inaugural flight by Kairali Aviation. The project started in July 2012 and was noted for its quick completion, making it one of the fastest projects in Kerala. However, commercial operations were delayed due to opposition from the local fishing community.

In 2024, the service was relaunched under the UDAN scheme, a regional connectivity initiative by the Government of India. The service was inaugurated by Tourism Minister P. A. Mohammed Riyas on November 11 at the Bolgatty Waterdrome in Kochi. The aircraft in use is the De Havilland Canada seaplane.

== Structure & working ==
The role of the Kerala Government was only that of a facilitator and regulator. Kerala Tourism was to do the work of marketing and promotion. Facilities like water dromes and floating jetties have already been built by the Kerala Government at Ashtamudi, Kumarakom, Vembanad and Bekal. These are the four initial tourist spots being connected by the seaplane. These facilities will also be constructed at 21 other tourist spots (including Paravur) later. Houseboats have been deployed at the take-off and landing places for seaplanes and are equipped with special lounges for tourists.

The fares for the seaplane services were fixed by the operators and the seaplane services were to be operated by five operators — Bharat Aviation, Kairali Aviation, Mehair, Pawan Hans and Wings Aviation — from 10am to 5pm. The rate for the flight had been announced as ₹6000 per hour, subject to change. Refuelling and maintenance of the seaplanes were to be done at their respective base-station airports and not at the waterdromes to prevent any harm to marine ecology.

== Inauguration ==
The service was launched on 2 June 2013 by Chief Minister of Kerala Oommen Chandy in the backwaters of the Ashtamudi Lake in Kollam district using a 5+1 seater Cessna 206H amphibian aircraft. The inaugural flight took off on time, but landed back at Ashtamudi after flying for a short distance due to bad weather. It was to be officially launched for tourists in August 2013.

Kerala's Minister for Tourism, A.P. Anil Kumar, had announced that four more companies would launch services from the Thiruvananthapuram, Kochi, Kozhikode and Mangalore airports to backwaters in Kollam, Alappuzha, Ernakulam and Kasargode districts by the end of 2013.

=== Reactions ===
The inaugural launch received a mixed response with protests by two Left backed organisations of traditional fishermen who claimed that the seaplane service was a threat to their livelihood and marine ecology. Owing to protests, the seaplane was forced to change its landing location. But, Mr. Anil Kumar said, "The fishing community in Kollam has given its approval to the tourism project. Now, we will speak to the community at Alappuzha to convince them that it will not threaten their profession." The government, however, constituted a committee to study the impact of the seaplane operations on the livelihood of the local fishing community

The aircraft remained grounded at the Cochin international airport at Nedumbaserry since 3 June. The expert committee was unable to submit its final report even towards the end of the year. Kairali Aviation, unable to cope with the mounting losses and the uncertainty of restarting the service, returned the aircraft back to its lessor.

== Domestic Destinations ==
- Kerala
  - Kochi International Airport
  - Calicut International Airport
  - Trivandrum International Airport
  - Kollam
  - Bekal
  - Astamudi
  - Ernakulam
  - Kasargode
  - Alappuzha
- Karnataka
  - Mangalore International Airport

== See also ==
- List of airlines of India
