= Bekal Airport =

Proposed airport in Bekal, India

- IATA: none; ICAO: none

Summary
- Airport type: Public
- Owner: Airports Authority of India
- Operator: Airports Authority of India
- Serves: Bekal / Kasargod
- Location: Bekal, Kerala, India
- Coordinates: 12°25′30.093″N 075°02′50.472″E

Map
- Location within Kerala Location within India

Runways
Direction	Length		Surface
Direction	m	ft	Surface
	1,000	3,281

Bekal Airport is a proposed airport to be constructed at Periya, near Bekal, Kerala.

== History ==
In 2016, the Government of Kerala has appointed Cochin International Airport Limited to undertake the Bekal Airstrip project.

Under the UDAN 4 scheme, the Ministry of Civil Aviation (India) gave preliminary approval to the Bekal Airstrip project in 2019. The airport would spread across 80 acres of land at Kanniyamkundu, 7 km from Periya.

The Airports Authority of India will develop the infrastructure and operate the airport.

== Proposed Facilities ==
The airport is planned as a regional aviation facility designed primarily for small aircraft operations. Early proposals envisage a runway of approximately 1,000 metres, capable of supporting short-haul flights connecting Bekal with other airports in Kerala and neighbouring states.
