= Bio 360 Life Sciences Park =

Park in Thiruvananthapuram, Kerala, India

Bio 360 Life Sciences Park Trivandrum
- Type: Government-owned
- Industry: Biotechnology and Life Sciences Park
- Genre: Infrastructure Service Provider
- Founded: August 2013; 13 years ago
- Headquarters: Thiruvananthapuram, Kerala, India
- Owner: Kerala State Industrial Development Corporation, Government of Kerala
- Website: www.bio360.in

Bio 360 Life Sciences Park is a Biotechnology and Life Sciences park in the city of Thiruvananthapuram, India. Established in 2013, by the Government of Kerala, the Phase I of the park is spread over 75 acres (30 ha). An additional 128.5 acres (52.0 ha) of land is being undertaken by the government of Kerala as the Phase 2 development of the park.

The park focuses on incubation, R&D and manufacturing in the fields of life sciences, biotechnology, nanotechnology. bioinformatics, biomedical devices and pharmaceuticals. Bio 360 is on National Highway 66 at Thonnakkal, 22 kilometres (14 mi) from Trivandrum International Airport. Similar industrial parks like Technopark is 10 kilometres (6.2 mi) and Technocity is 3 kilometres (1.9 mi) from Bio 360 and 30 Km from Vizhinjam International Seaport Thiruvananthapuram

== Institutions ==
Bio 360 Life Sciences Park houses the Bioscience Research and Training Centre (BRTC) of the Kerala Veterinary and Animal Sciences University (KVASU). BRTC do research into disease prevention and immune systems in animals. KVASU is also planning to start an Animal Research Facility as part of the BRTC. The Sree Chitra Tirunal Institute for Medical Sciences and Technology (SCTIMST) is planning to establish a bio-medical equipment unit for research and production of bio-medical equipment.

=== Institute of Advanced Virology, Kerala ===
The Institute of Advanced Virology, Kerala established by the Kerala Biotechnology Commission (KBC) is a ₹500 crore (US$52 million) project hosted in the park. The institute will offer academic discipline, including PG diploma and Ph.D. in virology. The Virology Institute includes high-end research facilities to study viruses and viral infections. The institute will also have 9 laboratories with Biosafety Level 3 and Biosafety level 2 facilities. The bio safety level 3 (BSL-3) laboratory will be upgraded to Biosafety level 4 subsequently. The institute will have facilities for the development of novel antiviral drugs, vaccines and molecular diagnostic tools. The institute would also house a unit of the Global Virus Network.

== See also ==
- Technopark, Trivandrum
- Technocity, Thiruvananthapuram
