= 2013 Kerala solar panel scam =

Political scandal in Kerala

The 2013 Kerala solar panel scam occurred in 2013, when a solar energy company, Team Solar, in Kerala, India, used two women to create political contacts with links including to the Chief Minister's office. The company duped several influential people to the tune of 70 lakhs, by offering to make them business partners, or by offering to install solar power units for them, and receiving advance payments for the same. Team Solar was unsuccessful in lobbying Kerala Govt to get their firm included in ANERT programmes.

== Incident ==
The Team Solar Energy Company (Team Solar), floated by the main accused Biju Radhakrishnan and Saritha. S. Nair, directors of the company, allegedly collected advance amounts from large number of people and investors by offering to make them business partners, or in the guise of installing alternate sources of energy and failed to deliver the goods. The company awarded a "Virgin Earth Golden Feather Environment Award" to several prominent people of Kerala to gain media coverage and credibility. The scam came to light when one of the customers who had paid for the installation filed a case against the company. The arrangement has defrauded several agencies and people to the tune of crores of rupees and at least one lady actor was used as "brand ambassador" to lure gullible people. There were widespread protests across the state, mainly by Leftist youth groups, after an interview with an industrialist was aired on television, which alleged fraud by the company. The incident drew much attention because most of those who lost big money were all influential people, the women allegedly involved fueled the imagination/ jealousy of the depraved Malayalam Media and the alleged involvement of three officials from the office of the Chief Minister of Kerala, Oommen Chandy, who made several phone calls to Saritha. It caused great embarrassment to Chandy, who faced demands for his resignation; two of the officials involved in phone conversation, lost their positions. The total amount involved in the scam, calculated on the basis of complaints, is less than ₹100 million (US$1.0 million) but the aggressive protests by Leftist political parties and the modus operandi used by the company has made the scam notorious.

== Arrests ==
Five persons have been arrested in connection with this scam. The chief accused, Saritha Nair and one of the Chief Minister's personal aides Tenny Joppan has been fired and arrested. The director of the Public Relations Department, who allegedly received Rs 500,000 from the Team Solar man, has been suspended and has gone underground fearing arrest. Other people accused in the case, who have been arrested include Biju Radhakrishnan, and Malayalam movie/TV actress and dancer, Shalu Menon.

=== Biju Radhakrishnan ===
Biju Radhakrishnan was already caught in a case pertaining to the murder of his wife Rashmi. However, despite having evidence of his involvement in the murder, he was not arrested After his arrest, at Coimbatore, by the Kollam Crime Branch CID, he admitted to Rashmi's murder by giving her poisoned liquor.

=== Saritha S Nair ===
Saritha Nair was a director of the Team Solar Renewable Energy Co. and an accomplice of the Biju Radhakrishnan in the Solar Scam. She was arrested on the complaint of one of the persons who she had defrauded, in Ambalapuzha She later requested the Economic Offences court where her case is being heard, that she wanted to give a secret statement, which would help to broaden the scope of the investigation. Her attorney, Fenny Balakrishnan termed the revelations as very crucial and capable of changing the direction of the investigation. She was released on bail in February 2014. Her name reappeared in the news after her scandal video was released and went viral on social media including WhatsApp on 12 October 2014. On 2 June 2015 her short film Anthyakoodasha was released on YouTube, which has crossed 500k views as on 18 May 2016.

=== Shalu Menon ===
Television and film actress Shalu Menon, a close associate of Biju Radhakrishnan, initially denied any knowledge or relationship with Biju Radhakrishnan. Photographs showing the two of them posing together or Biju handing over keys to a new vehicle she had purchased recently were explained away, on TV, as pictures taken at his request. Later, she came under the scanner of the Police and was arrested upon concluding that she was also an accomplice to the scam and had used her popularity to entice customers into parting with their money. She was released on bail in August 2013.

=== Tenny Joppan ===
Tenny, an aide and personal staff member of Kerala Chief Minister Oommen Chandy was arrested on charges of cheating, for aiding Biju Radhakrishnan and Saritha for defrauding a businessman, Sreedharan Nair, to the tune of 40 Lakh Indian Rupees. He was released on bail in August 2013.

=== A. Firoze ===
A. Firoz, a government servant, surrendered himself on 18 July, after the court rejected his plea for anticipatory bail. He was accused of helping to dupe a builder of 4 million Rupees along with Biju and Saritha, by claiming one of them was an ADB official and they could arrange a contract with the ADB. He was suspended from service after his name surfaced as one of the accomplices of Biju.

== Phone call controversy ==
At least four Kerala Cabinet ministers, three MLAs and hordes of government officials besides a junior Central Minister had been roped in by the women and their phone calls.

== Allegations against the Chief Minister ==
Allegations against the Chief Minister Oommen Chandy have been raised, due to phone calls made by his personal staff and forged letters which were used by the fraudsters to defraud customers. The issue snowballed when Sridharan Nair, a quarry owner, claimed that he had met the Chief Minister, at his office, along with Saritha, during which the Chief Minister encouraged investments in renewable energy. The Chief Minister refuted these claims on the floor of the Assembly, stating that the only time he met Sridharan Nair was as a representative of Quarry owners.Later on all allegations against the chief minister was proved false and was dismissed. The allegations are being used by the opposition LDF as a reason to stall the proceedings of the Kerala Legislative Assembly and demand the resignation of the Kerala Chief Minister.

== Kerala secretariat siege ==
Mounting pressure on Kerala Chief Minister Oommen Chandy to tender for a judicial investigation and thereby his resignation over the solar scam, the CPI (M)-led Left Democratic Front (LDF) on 12 August 2013, had conducted an indefinite, allegedly illegal siege on the state secretariat which lasted for 30 hours. The siege was addressed by Former Prime Minister and Janata Dal (Secular) chief H.D Deve Gowda and CPI(M) General Secretary Prakash Karat. The activists of the LDF, who blocked three entry and exit gates of the Kerala Secretariat and claimed that the fourth will be blocked later in that day. The Left Democratic Front in Kerala had demanded a judicial investigation in the scam, which was later allowed by the government which led to the conclusion of the siege.

== Crime branch findings ==
The Crime Branch appointed by First Vijayan ministry in the year 2018 found that there was no evidence against Oommen Chandy in the scam. As part of the procedures, the state home secretary T. K. Jose had forwarded a report to the central government. According to the report, no evidence could be collected against Chandy and the Crime Branch failed to confirm that the incident mentioned in the complaint actually happened. The case was handed over to the central agency after several teams of the Kerala Police, repeatedly failed to prove the allegations against Chandy.
