= Kerala Nuclear Power Station =

Proposed nuclear power plant Kasaragod, Kerala

Kerala Nuclear Power Station Cheemeni Nuclear Power Station
- Country: India
- Coordinates: 12.250315712054606°N 75.27993409045652°E
- Status: Proposed / Conceptual
- Operator: Nuclear Power Corporation of India Ltd (NPCIL)

NOTE:For Those who have read this article before 15/6/2026 the details on the right were vandalized and has now been corrected by PixelHistorian

The Kerala Nuclear Power Station or Cheemeni Nuclear Power Station is a proposed nuclear power plant It is proposed to be built on a 150 acres (61 ha) area, near Cheemeni Kasaragod district of Kerala. The project has sparked debates regarding its feasibility, environmental impact, and public acceptance.

== Background ==
In August 2024, the Kerala State Electricity Board (KSEB) commissioned the National Institute of Advanced Studies (NIAS), Bengaluru, to conduct feasibility studies for nuclear power plants in Cheemeni and Athirapilly. By December 2024, the Government of India expressed interest in approving the Cheemeni project, contingent on the availability of sufficient land. Central Minister of Power Manohar Lal Khattar identified Cheemeni as a strategic site due to its low seismic activity and favourable geographic location.

The concept of a power plant in Cheemeni emerged in 2007, when the Kerala State Electricity Board (KSEB) proposed setting up a 1,200 MW coal-based thermal power plant to address the state’s growing energy demands. However, the project faced significant opposition from environmentalists and local communities, given Kerala’s commitment to sustainability and the adverse environmental impact of coal power. In 2013, the Kerala government revived discussions on an alternative power project in Cheemeni, including the possibility of natural gas-based power generation. However, logistical and cost-related challenges prevented significant progress.

== Public Response and Controversy ==
The proposed nuclear project has ignited significant opposition from local communities, environmentalists, and anti-nuclear groups, primarily due to concerns over safety, environmental impact, and economic viability. The Matsya Thozhilali Aikya Vedhi (Fishermen's United Front) has demanded the government to drop plans to build a nuclear power plant in the State. India Today reported that Kerala clarified that it didn’t request a nuclear plant but only emphasised the potential of utilisation of thorium deposits in the state.

In December 2024, local communities organized a protest meeting against the Cheemeni project. The event was inaugurated by S. P. Udayakumar, an activist known for leading the anti-Kudankulam Nuclear Power Plant movement in Tamil Nadu. Anti-nuclear activists wrote an open letter to the top leader of Kerala's ruling party Prakash Karat, urging him to drop the Cheemeni project.

== Concerns ==
A major point of contention has been Kasaragod’s high population density. The disasters of Chernobyl (1986) and Fukushima (2011) have reinforced public fears about potential radiation hazards. Given the region’s unpredictable wind patterns, critics argue that even a minor nuclear accident could have devastating consequences.

Cheemeni is located in the Western Ghats, a UNESCO-recognized biodiversity hotspot. Environmentalists argue that even minor ecological disruptions in this region could have long-term consequences. Concerns also include seismic vulnerabilities and the challenge of securing adequate land for the project.

Author and environmentalist Ameer Shahul in an opinion piece in The News Minute questioned the financial sustainability of the project, citing the high construction and operational costs of nuclear plants, as well as the long-term challenges of nuclear waste management. He argued that nuclear power in India has often over-promised and under-delivered, raising doubts about its economic justification.

== Current Status ==
As of early 2025, the feasibility study is ongoing, while public opposition continues to grow. The final decision on the project is expected to depend on further government approvals, environmental assessments, and public consultations.

== See also ==
- IPHWR-700
- Nuclear power in India
