= CIAL Solar Power Project =

Photovoltaic power station at COK airport, India

CIAL solar power project
- Country: India
- Location: Kochi, Kerala
- Coordinates: 10.1518°N 76.3930°E
- Status: Operational
- Commission date: October 2015

Solar farm
- Type: Flat-panel PV
- Site area: 45 acres (18 ha)

Power generation
- Nameplate capacity: 50MW

The CIAL Solar Power Project is a 50 megawatt (MW) photovoltaic power station built at Cochin International Airport, India, by the company Cochin International Airport Limited (CIAL). Cochin International Airport became the first fully solar powered airport in the world with the commissioning the plant. The plant comprises 92,150 solar panels laid across 94 acres and is capable of generating 100,000 units of electricity daily.

== Overview ==
The plant comprises 92,150 solar panels laid across 94 acres near the international cargo complex. The plant has been installed and commissioned by the India-based Ammini Group. It is capable of generating 100,000 units of electricity daily, and is equipped with a supervisory control and data acquisition system (SCADA), through which remote monitoring is carried out and the project valued around Rs. 260 Crores (2016). The project components include PV modules of 265Wp capacity manufactured by Ammini Solar, and inverters of 1MW capacity manufactured by ABB It is coupled with a 2.1 MW solar plant that was commissioned in 2013. This plant was installed by Ammini Solar Private Limited. 8000 numbers of monocrystalline modules of 250Wp with thirty three numbers of 60 kW capacity Delta make string inverters were used in this plant, which is the first Megawatt scale installation of Solar PV system in the State of Kerala.

The plant system is without any battery storage as it is directly connected to the KSEB grid. CIAL gives as much power as it produces (during the day time) to the grid, and buys back the power from them as needed, especially at night.

== Expansion ==
CIAL has decided to double the installed capacity of solar power generation. Another 10,000 panels would be installed in the remaining space to generate an additional 2.40 MW power. Panels to be installed atop the building and the new park would help generate 4 MW and another 7 MW through panels to be installed over the three km-long irrigation canal would take the total installed capacity to 26.50 MW. On 12 December 2020 a 5.1 MW Solar Carport was inaugurated along with the revamped T2 terminal, making it the largest solar carport in an airport. This addition also took the total capacity to 80 MW.

== Environmental impact ==
This green power project will not result in any carbon dioxide emissions over the next 25 years. It will produce a clean source of energy equivalent to energy produced from coal-fired power plants burning more than 3 lakh metric tonnes of coal. This plant also provides a carbon offset equivalent of planting 30 lakh trees. CIAL sets an example by effectively utilizing the buffer zone area.

== See also ==
- Solar power in India
- List of photovoltaic power stations
- Photovoltaics
- Renewable energy
- Solar energy
