= Karode =

- village
- Location in Kerala, India Karode (India)
- Coordinates: 8°19′10.5″N 77°06′37.6″E
- Country: India
- State: Kerala
- District: Thiruvananthapuram

Government
  - Body: Gram panchayat

Population (2011)
  - Total: 31,918

Languages
  - Official: Malayalam, English
- Time zone: UTC+5:30 (IST)
- PIN: 695506
- Vehicle registration: KL-19
- Website: http://lsgkerala.in/karodepanchayat

Karode is a village in Thiruvananthapuram district in the state of Kerala, India.

== Demographics ==
As of 2011 India census, Karode had a population of 31918 with 15651 males and 16267 females.
