= Kumarakom =

- Village
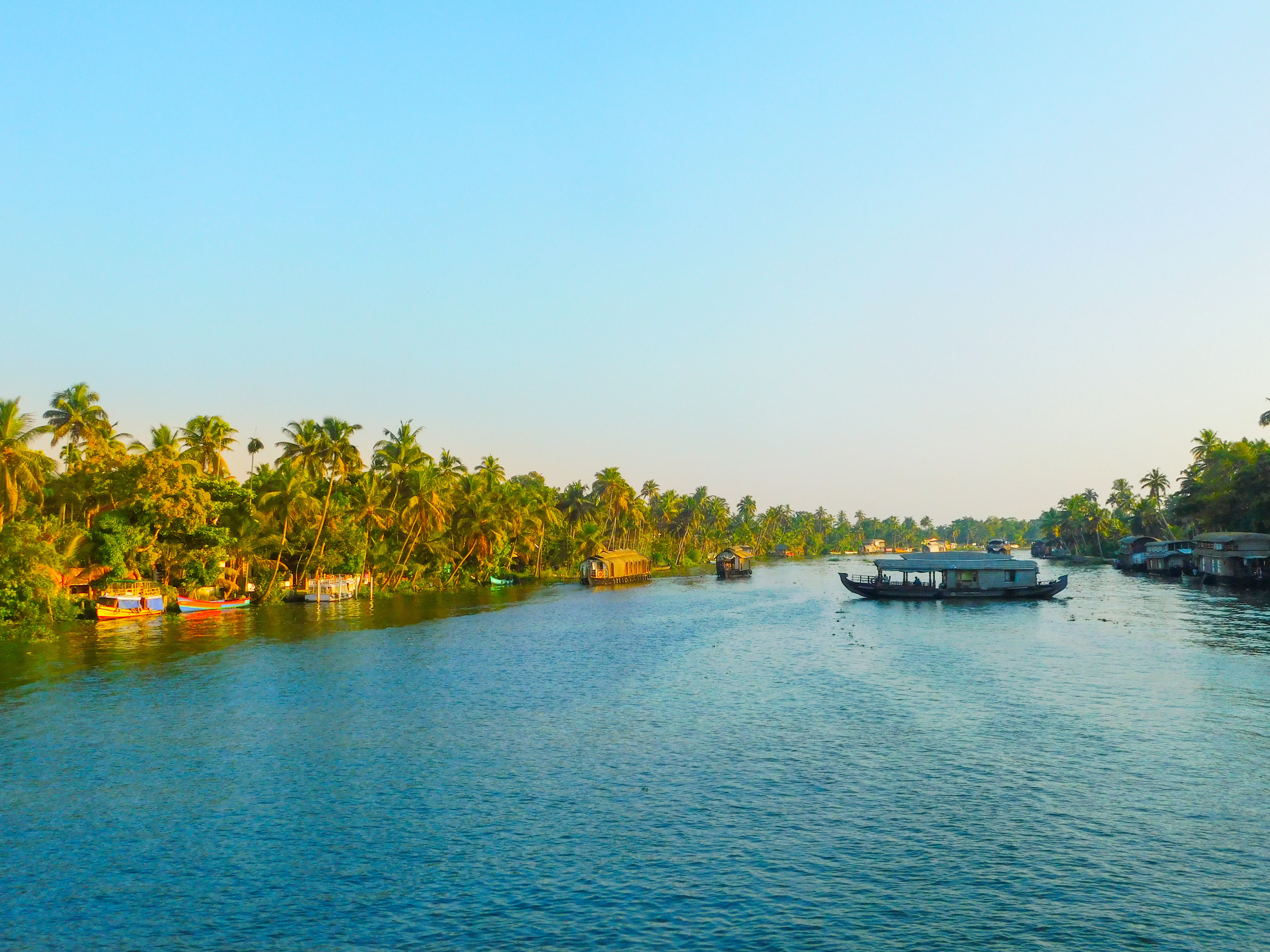
- Houseboat at Kumarakom lake

- Location in Kerala, India
- Coordinates: 09°35′42″N 76°25′49″E
- Country: India
- State: Kerala
- District: Kottayam

Languages
  - Official: Malayalam, English
- Time zone: UTC+5:30 (IST)
- Vehicle registration: KL-05
- Nearest city: Kottayam

Kumarakom is a tourism destination near the city of Kottayam in Kerala, India. It is near the Vembanad Lake, the largest lake in the state of Kerala. In January 2023 The New York Times mentioned Kumarakom's backwater tourism.

== Climate ==
Kumarakom has two monsoons-south west and north east.

== Boat race ==
Boat races include the Nehru Trophy boat race Alappuzha.

== In popular culture ==
Arundhati Roy's The God of Small Things is set in Ayemenem or Aymanam village, which adjoins Kumarakom. The explosive success of this novel has given some added tourism impetus to this area. The Taj Garden Retreat hotel complex is centered on a building that is called "History House" in the novel; it was built by British missionary Alfred George Baker, whom the locals called "Kari Saipu" (possibly an elided form of "Baker Sahib"), as in the novel. Four generations of Bakers lived in the house until 1962, speaking Malayalam, and even wearing the mundu. The Baker Memorial School, Kottayam, was started by a daughter of this family in 1925. The Baker family's house is in ruins in the novel, as it was in reality before was developed into a hotel and has been restored by the Taj group. The Ayemenem house, where Arundhati Roy spent part of her childhood (like the twins in the story), can also be visited in the village, which can be reached by boat along the Meenachil river that figures prominently in the story.

== Special tourism zone ==
Kumarakom has been declared a special tourism zone by the Kerala state government, as legislated for by Kerala Tourism Act, 2005.

== Awards and honours ==
It had won top honours including the UNWTO Ulysses Award for Innovation in Public Policy and Governance. The Kumarakom initiative had earlier won the National Award for Best Responsible Tourism Project and also the PATA Grand Award for Environment.
