= Bekal =

Town in Kasargod District, Kerala, India

- Town
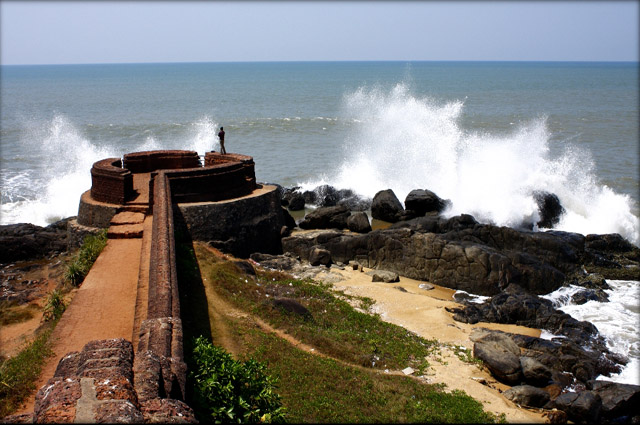
- Bekal Fort

- Location in Kerala, India Bekal (India)
- Coordinates: 12.4204°N 75.0231°E
- Country: India
- State: Kerala
- District: Kasaragod
- Taluk: Hosdurg

Government
  - Type: Panchayati raj (India)
  - Body: Pallikara Panchayat, Udma Panchayat
  - Deputy Superintendent of Police: C.K. Sunil Kumar

Languages
  - Official: Malayalam, English
- Time zone: UTC+5:30 (IST)
- PIN: 671318, 671319
- Telephone code: 04672
- ISO 3166 code: IN-KL
- Vehicle registration: KL-60
- Nearest city: Kanhangad
- Assembly constituency: Udma
- Lok Sabha constituency: Kasaragod

Bekal (Malayalam: [beːkːɐl]) is a small town in the Kasaragod district on the West coast of the state of Kerala, India.

== Location ==
Bekal is a town located 14 km (8.7 mi) south of Kasaragod town and 12 km (7.5 mi) north of Kanhangad on the State Highway 57. Bekal Fort is the largest fort in Kerala state situated adjacent to the beach. Shaped like a giant keyhole, the historic Bekal Fort offers a view of the Arabian Sea from its tall observation towers, which had huge cannons a couple centuries ago.

The state of Kerala is reviewing a plan to start seaplane services connecting Bekal with Kollam Ashtamudi, Kumarakom, Punnamada and famous Paravur backwaters. Bekal in Northern Kerala was one of the top ten travel destinations selected by Lonely Planet.

Local roads have access to NH 66 which connects to Mangalore in the north and Calicut in the south. The nearest railway station is Kanhangad on Mangalore-Palakkad line. There are airports at Mangalore, Calicut and Kannur.

== Transportation ==
Kerala State Highway connects to Kasaragod in the north and Kanhangad in the south. The nearest railway station is Bekal Fort Railway Station, Kotikulam Railway Station and Kanhangad Railway Station on Mangalore-Palakkad line. There are airports at Mangalore, Kannur and Calicut.
