= Kerala State Industrial Development Corporation =

Kerala State Industrial Development Corporation Limited (KSIDC)
- Company type: Public Sector
- Industry: Government
- Founded: 1961
- Headquarters: Thiruvananthapuram, Kerala, India
- Number of locations: Thiruvananthapuram, Kochi
- Area served: Industrial and Investment Promotion of the State
- Key people: Shri. [C. Balagopal(Bureaucrat)] Chairman; Shri. Vishnuraj P IAS Managing Director
- Products: Investment & Industrial Promotion
- Services: Promotes large and medium scale industries in Kerala Nodal agency for foreign and domestic investments in Kerala
- Owner: Government of Kerala
- Website: ksidc.org

Kerala State Industrial Development Corporation Ltd. is the industrial and investment promotion agency of the Government of Kerala (India), for the promotion and development of medium and large scale units in the State of Kerala. As the Nodal Agency for foreign and domestic investments in Kerala, KSIDC provides support for investors, besides processing various incentive schemes and facilitating interaction between the government and the industrial sector.

Established in 1961, KSIDC is led by a group of professionals from various fields including Engineering, Management, Finance and Law. It has two offices in Kerala - the head office at Trivandrum (Thiruvananthapuram) and a regional office at Kochi (Cochin), Ernakulam. Shri. C Balagopal is the Chairman of KSIDC and Shri. Vishnu Raj P IAS is the managing director of KSIDC.

== Areas of focus ==
KSIDC assists in identifying the infrastructure needs of the State, structuring projects to bridge the gaps and spearheading a balanced growth of the core competencies of the State. The key areas of KSIDC's focus includes:

- Identification of Investment Ideas
- Translating ideas into concrete proposals
- Feasibility Study, Project Evaluation
- Financial Structuring, Loan Syndication
- Assisting in Central and State Govt. Clearances
- Development and Administration of Growth Centers
- Industrial and Infrastructure development

As of 2020, KSIDC has promoted more than 700 projects in the State of Kerala with an investment outlay of over Rs.8000 crores providing employment to over 1 Lakh persons.
