= Department of Electronics and Information Technology (Kerala) =

Department of the government of Kerala, India

Department overview
- Jurisdiction: Government of Kerala
- Headquarters: Government Secretariat, Thiruvananthapuram
- Minister responsible: P.K. Kunhalikutty, Minister for Electronics and Information Technology
- Department executive: Seeram Sambasiva Rao IAS, Secretary to Government
- Child Department: Kerala State IT Mission
- Website: https://eitd.kerala.gov.in/

The Electronics and Information Technology Department is an administrative department of the Government of Kerala. It is responsible for policy formulation and implementation related to information technology and its development in the state of Kerala.

== Governance and administration ==
The department is under the leadership of a cabinet Minister for Electronics and Information Technology, and incumbent Minister is P. K. Kunhalikutty, the Industries Minister of Kerala, who also holds the charge.

The department is administratively headed by a Principal Secretary to the Government, an IAS officer. The Secretary is assisted by additional, joint, deputy, and under secretaries at the secretariat.

== Functions ==
The department is responsible for coordinating Government initiatives in the IT sector and for promoting and developing information technology in the State. The department is tasked with the E-governance. The department is also responsible for administration of the child agencies.

== Digital University ==
The Government of Kerala established a university exclusively for Information Technology and Electronics, the Kerala Digital University, in 2020 by upgrading the Indian Institute of Information Technology and Management, Kerala (IIITM-K).

== IT Parks ==
- Technopark, Trivandrum
- Technopark, Kollam
- Cyberpark, Kozhikode
- Technocity, Thiruvananthapuram
- InfoPark Kochi
- Infopark, Thrissur
- Infopark, Cherthala
- Techno-lodge

== IT Projects ==
- Akshaya project
- KITE Kerala (under General Education Department)

== Child agencies ==
- Centre for Development of Imaging Technology (C-DIT)
- Kerala State IT Mission (KSITM)
- Information Kerala Mission (IKM)
- Kerala State Electronics Development Corporation (KELTRON)
- Centre for Development of Advanced Computing (C-DAC)
- Kerala State Spatial data infrastructure (KSDI)
- Kerala State IT Infrastructure Limited (KSITL)
- The ICT Academy of Kerala (ICTAK)

== See also ==
- Government of Kerala
