= Technopark, Trivandrum =

Science park in India

Coordinates: 8.558°N 76.881°E

Technopark Thiruvananthapuram

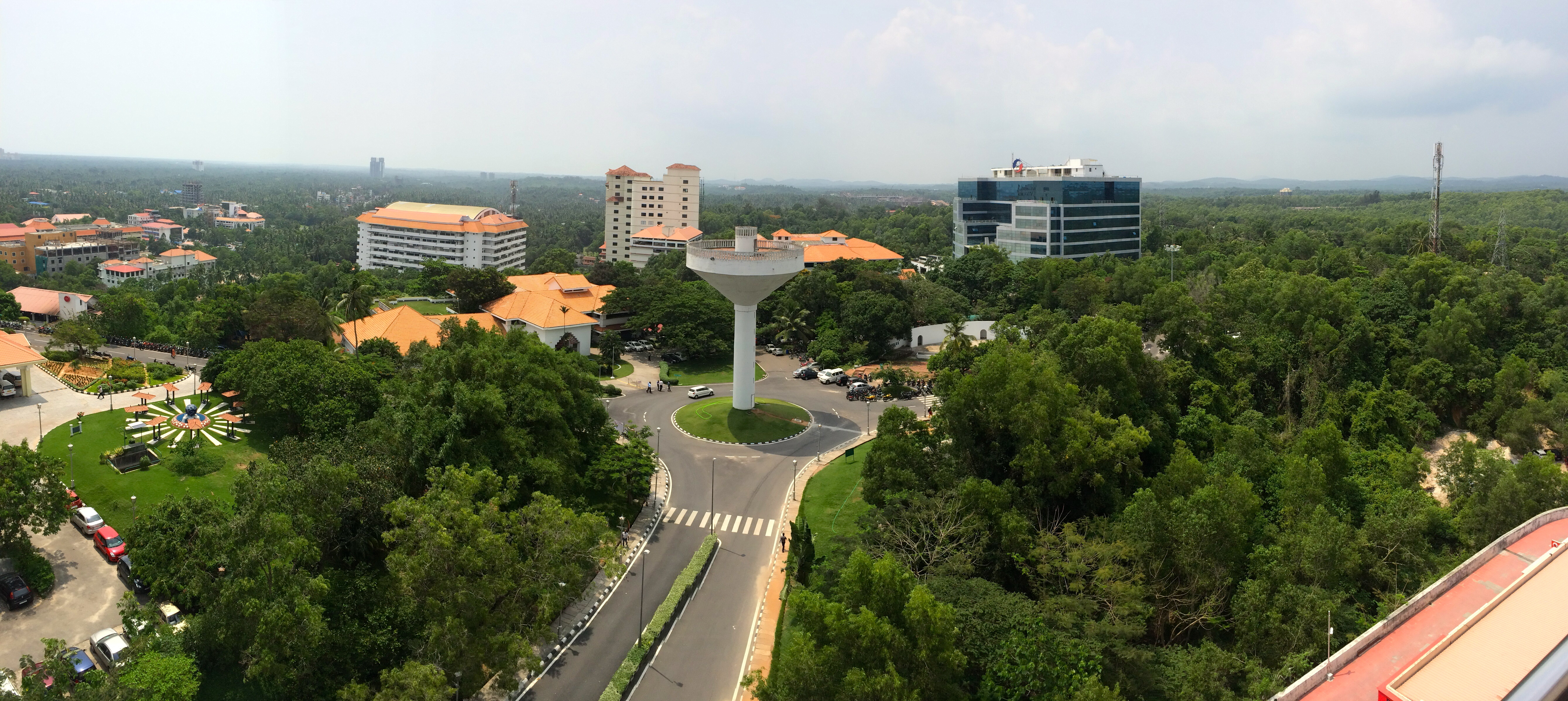
- Aerial view of Technopark Phase I campus in June 2014
- Type: Government owned
- Industry: Information Technology Business Park
- Genre: Infrastructure Service Provider
- Founded: July 1990 Dedicated to nation in November 1995
- Headquarters: Thiruvananthapuram, Kerala, India
- Number of locations: Thiruvananthapuram, Kollam
- Area served: 12.72 Million sq.ft.
- Key people: Minister for Information Technology, Chairman Seeram Sambasiva Rao IAS, Special Secretary (Electronics & IT) Sandip Kumar, IAS, CEO
- Owner: Department of Electronics and Information Technology, Government of Kerala
- Number of employees: 75,000
- Website: https://technopark.in

Technopark is a technology park in Thiruvananthapuram in the state of Kerala, India. Conceptualized in 1990 by the Government of Kerala, under chief minister E K Nayanar, it is the largest information technology (IT) park in Asia in terms of area.

Technopark has 12.72 million sq ft (1.182 million m^{2}) of built-up area, and is home to over 490 companies, employing more than 75,000 professionals, and still growing.

The policy of economic liberalisation initiated by the government of India in 1991, and the rapid growth of the global software industry during the 1990s, substantially contributed to this growth. As a result of the 2008 financial crisis and the Great Recession, the park saw a period of reduced growth in 2009–10, when exports were only 2.8% more than the previous year. During the 2016-17 financial year, the park recorded IT exports of Rs. 5,000 crores.

Technopark is owned and administered by the Government of Kerala and is headed by a chief executive officer. In addition to this, it has a governing council and a Project Implementation Board, both of which include top officials of the government. Administrative offices, including that of the CEO, are housed in the Park Centre building. Technopark also hosts a Technology Business Incubation Cell under Kerala Startup Mission.

Technopark houses domestic firms, joint ventures, and subsidiaries of foreign companies engaged in a wide variety of activities, which include embedded software development, smart card technology, enterprise resource planning (ERP), process control software design, engineering and computer-aided design software development, IT Enabled Services (ITES), process re-engineering, animation, and e-business.

== History and mission ==
Then Chief Minister of Kerala, E. K. Nayanar visited the Apple facility in the United States in 1989. This led to forming of Technopark, India's first IT park and still remains the largest in India. Nayanar laid the foundation stone on 1990 after it was registered under the Travancore Cochin Scientific and Charitable Societies Act. As of 2020, the IT park employs 70,000 people and provides indirect employment to lakhs. In March 1990, the Government of Kerala conceptualised Technopark as a facility to foster the development of high-technology industries in the state. Technopark was set up under the auspices of Electronics Technology Park, Kerala—an autonomous body under the Department of Information Technology of the government of Kerala.

Technopark's aim was to create infrastructure to support the development of high-technology companies. On 31 March 1991, the foundation stone for Technopark was laid by E K Nayanar, Chief Minister of Kerala, at a ceremony presided over by K R Gowri Amma, Minister for Industries. Technopark was formally dedicated to the nation by the then prime minister, P.V. Narasimha Rao, in November, 1995.

Since then, Technopark has been growing steadily both in size and employee strength. Park Centre, Pamba, and Periyar were the only buildings constructed in the beginning, by 1995. Since then, Technopark has periodically added new buildings, such as Nila (1997), Gayathri, and Bhavani. With the inauguration of the 850,000 sq ft (79,000 m^{2}) "Thejaswini", on 22 February 2007, Technopark became the largest IT Park in India. After that, Leela Group has built a facility, "Leela Infopark", that hosts MNCs like Allianz, Oracle Corporation, D+H, RM Education, and Zafin.

== Socio-economic impact ==
Technopark has become the single largest source of employment in Kerala, with over seventy thousand people directly working in the facility.

== Workforce ==
Technopark hosts about 470 companies, and a workforce that numbers more than 70,000 personnel, in the IT and ITES sectors: companies such as Allianz, Ernst & Young, Speridian Technologies, Infosys, Guidehouse India, Oracle Corporation, Quest Global, SunTec Business Solutions, Tata Consultancy Services (TCS), Tata Elxsi, Toonz Media Group, and UST Global, as well as Finastra, H&R Block, IBS Software Services, Nissan Digital, RM Education, Envestnet, Tech Mahindra and RR Donnelley.

== Institutions ==
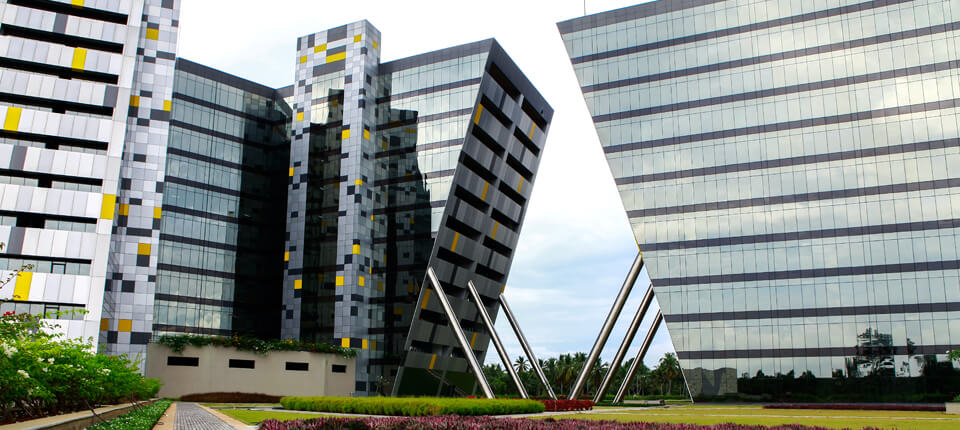
Buildings in Technopark Phase III

Technopark hosts two educational and research institutes. The Indian Institute of Information Technology and Management, Kerala, (IIITM–K) is an institution of higher education and research and development in applied Information Technology and Management. Portals for computational chemistry and agricultural information dissemination are among its areas of focus. IIITM–K is located at present in Park Centre.

The Asian School of Business (ASB) used to have its flagship post-graduate management programme in Technopark, before moving it to its own 16 Acre LEED-certified campus in 2011. The Asian School of Business is managed by a board of governors, which includes Tata Consultancy Services CEO S. Ramadorai and Infosys CEO Kris Gopalakrishnan.

== Infrastructure ==
Technopark aims to provide the infrastructure and support facilities needed for IT/ITES and electronics companies to function. In addition to office space, it provides utilities and connectivity, which is done either directly or through private partners. Besides, Technopark provides business incubation facilities for start-up firms as well as some social infrastructure for the personnel working in the park.

=== Buildings ===
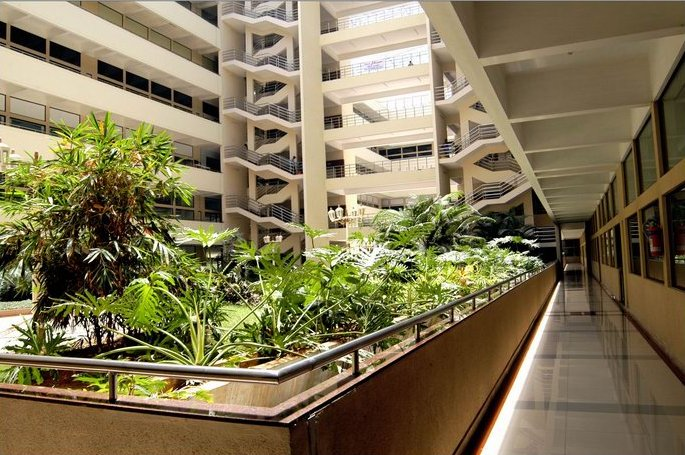
Interior of Bhavani building

Nila building

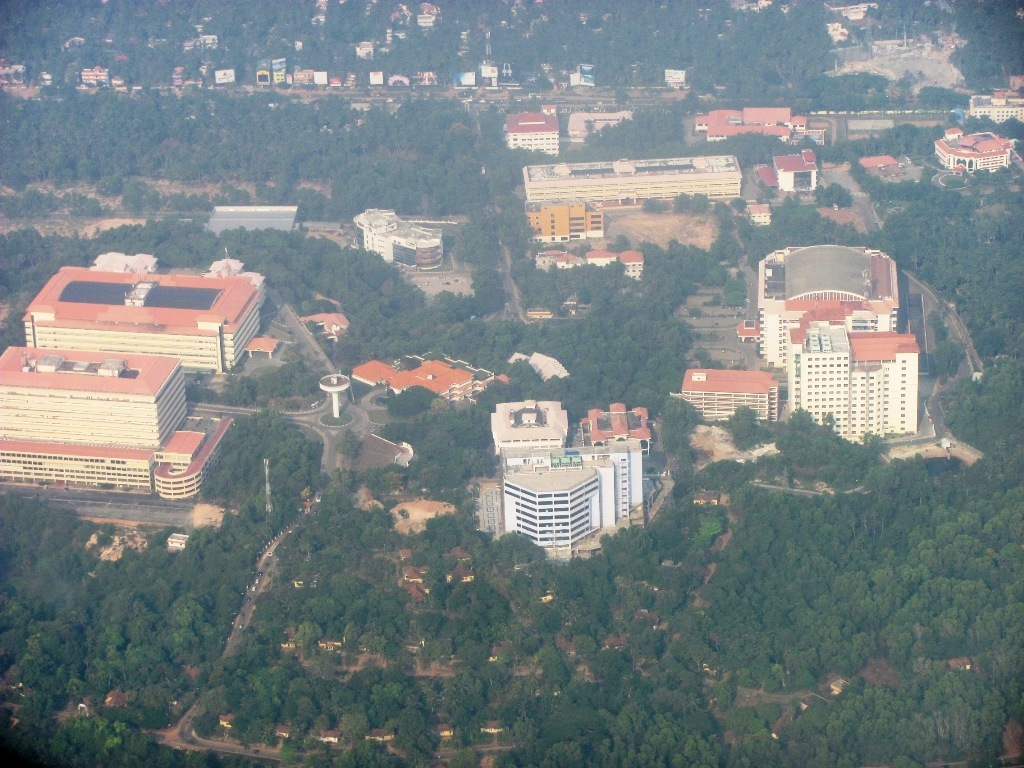
Amstor building

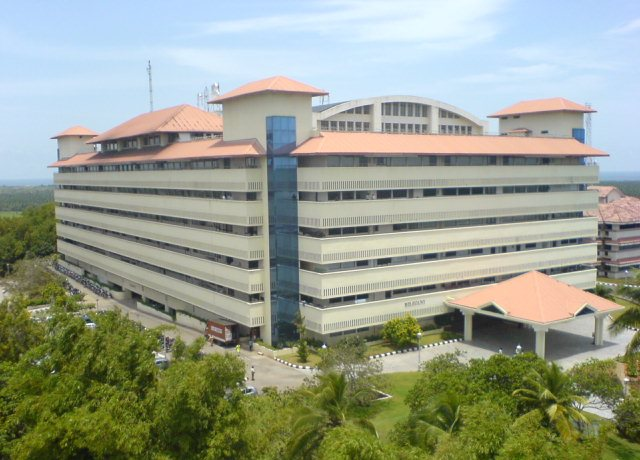
Bhavani building

There are currently about a dozen buildings on the Technopark campus intended for software development. Seven of the buildings are named after rivers in Kerala—the Pamba, the Periyar, the Nila, the Chandragiri, the Gayathri, Bhavani, and the Thejaswini, the seventh building, which was commissioned in February 2007, with over 600,000 sq ft (56,000 m^{2}) and 60,000 square metres (650,000 sq ft) of carpet area. There are also independent buildings of private enterprises inside the Phase I campus: Amstor House, Padmanabham, and M-squared. These buildings have an aggregate floor area of about 3,500,000 sq ft (330,000 m^{2}).

Key parameters of buildings in Technopark
Name	Number of floors	Total area (in thousand sq ft)	Number of elevators	Generator backup
Pamba	4	60	1	50%
Periyar	4	60	None	50%
Chandragiri	4	57	2	100%
Gayathri	3	129	4	100%
Nila	7	400	6	50%
Amstor	5	350	4	100%
Bhavani	6	480	6	100%
Thejaswini	12	850	8	100%
M-Squared Building	4	45	2	100%
TCS Peepul Park	4 to 5	325	N/A	100%
Tata Elxsi Neyyar	4	100	4	100%
IBS Campus	4 to 10	450	2	100%
Leela Info Park / Carnival Technopark	14	460	6	100%
Quest Global Towers	7	400	6	100%
IIITM Kerala	4		4	100%
N/A indicates no information available
10 sq ft.=~1 m^{2}.

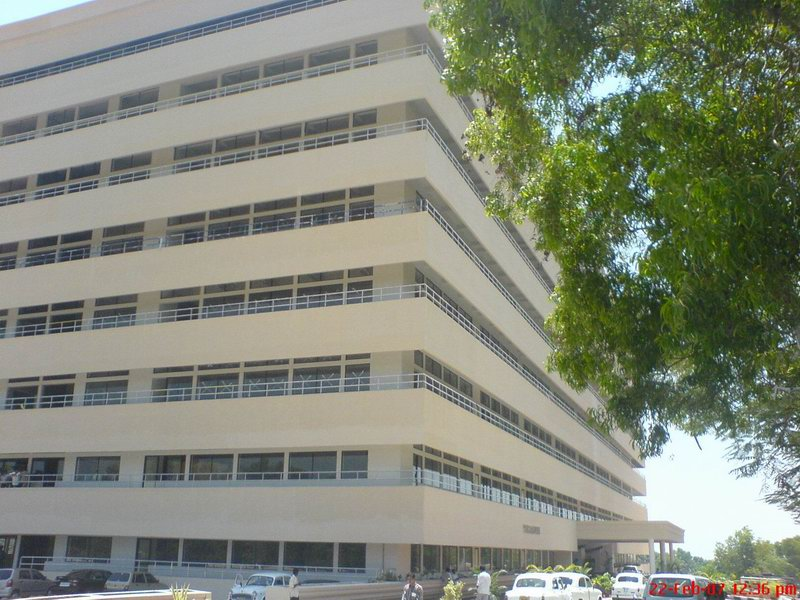
Thejaswini building

Other facilities in the campus include:

- Technopark Club – Includes a gym, swimming pool, restaurant, and sporting facilities.
- Technomall – a shopping complex
- Technopark guesthouse
- Private IT parks of individual companies
- Special Economic Zones (SEZ)
- Technology Business Incubator
- WiFi Solutions IT Rentals Infrastructure Service Provider

=== Utilities and support facilities ===
Technopark infrastructure facilities include power backup, uninterrupted water supply, and ambient air conditioning; for all buildings. 100% of electric power is available from the Kerala State Electricity Board Limited (KSEBL) and the diesel generators operate with less than 5% annual downtime (with at least 95% uptime, generating electricity). Technopark has its own 110kV electric transformer substation and a 25 mega volt-ampere dedicated internal power distribution system with built-in redundancies at all levels. The water supply is maintained through a dedicated water distribution system.

Technopark has other support facilities such as a satellite earth station, a 200-seater convention centre, a club, a guest house, a shopping complex (Techno-Mall), banks, ATMs, restaurants and conference rooms on campus. Furthermore, setting up of new units is accelerated by exemption from state-level clearances as well as through ready-to-use incubation facilities.

=== Transport facility ===
Technopark Express service is a public transport system for Technopark employees. It was inaugurated on 17 April 2017 by Hrishikesh R Nair, the then CEO of Technopark, Infopark, and Cyberpark.

=== Connectivity ===
Technopark offers multiple Internet service providers, including Reliance Infocomm, STPI, BSNL, Bhari, and VSNL. Leased-line fiber connectivity is available to all buildings on the campus, guaranteeing that connection breaks are a thing of the past.

Global Cloud Xchange—a subsidiary of 3i Infrastructure—has its FLAG global cable system at Thiruvananthapuram, providing direct connectivity to the Maldives and Sri Lanka. Technopark is connected through fibre link, with a self-healing redundant ring architecture, to Global Cloud Xchange's data center and gateway at Mumbai, directly connecting to FLAG, the undersea cable system backbone that connects 134 countries including the U.S., U.K., and other countries, in North America, Europe, the Middle East, South East Asia, and Asia Pacific.

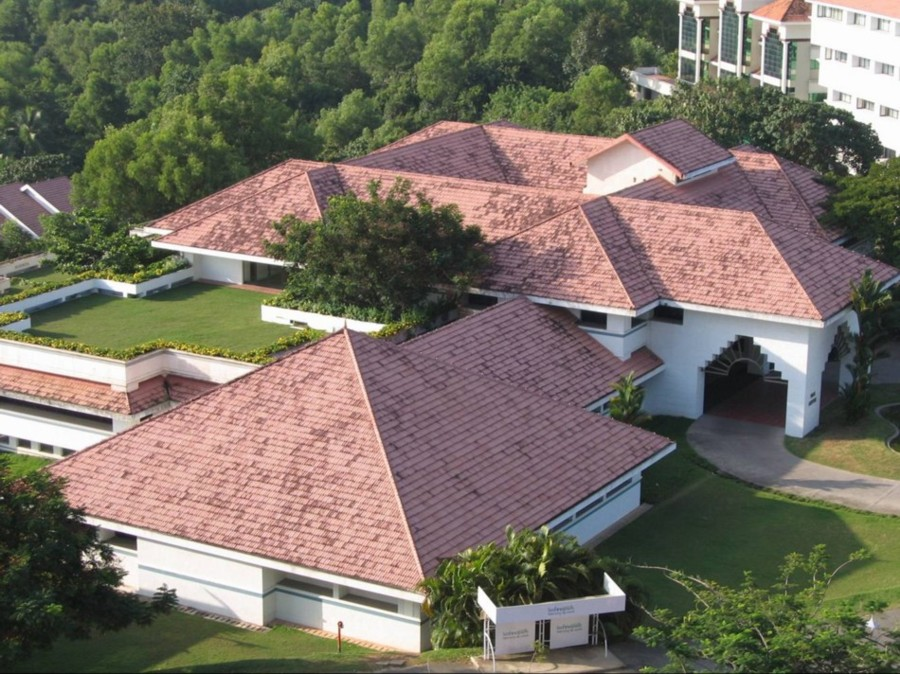
Park Centre, the administration office of Technopark

=== Technopark Business Incubation Centre (T-BIC) ===
The Kerala Startup Mission, formerly known as the Technopark Business Incubation Centre (T-BIC), aims to provide economical plug-and-play facilities to start-ups in the IT/ITES fields. This facility has given rise to over 47 successful ventures, many of whom have expanded by taking up space elsewhere in Technopark. T-BIC currently has 8,000 sq ft (740 m^{2}). (800 sq m.) at Park Centre, and this is being expanded with another 10,000 sq ft (930 m^{2}). (1000 sq m.) in the newest Technopark building, Thejaswini. One of the latest companies started at T-BIC is Entiresoft Technologies Private Limited.

== Expansion and new projects ==
=== Phase II ===
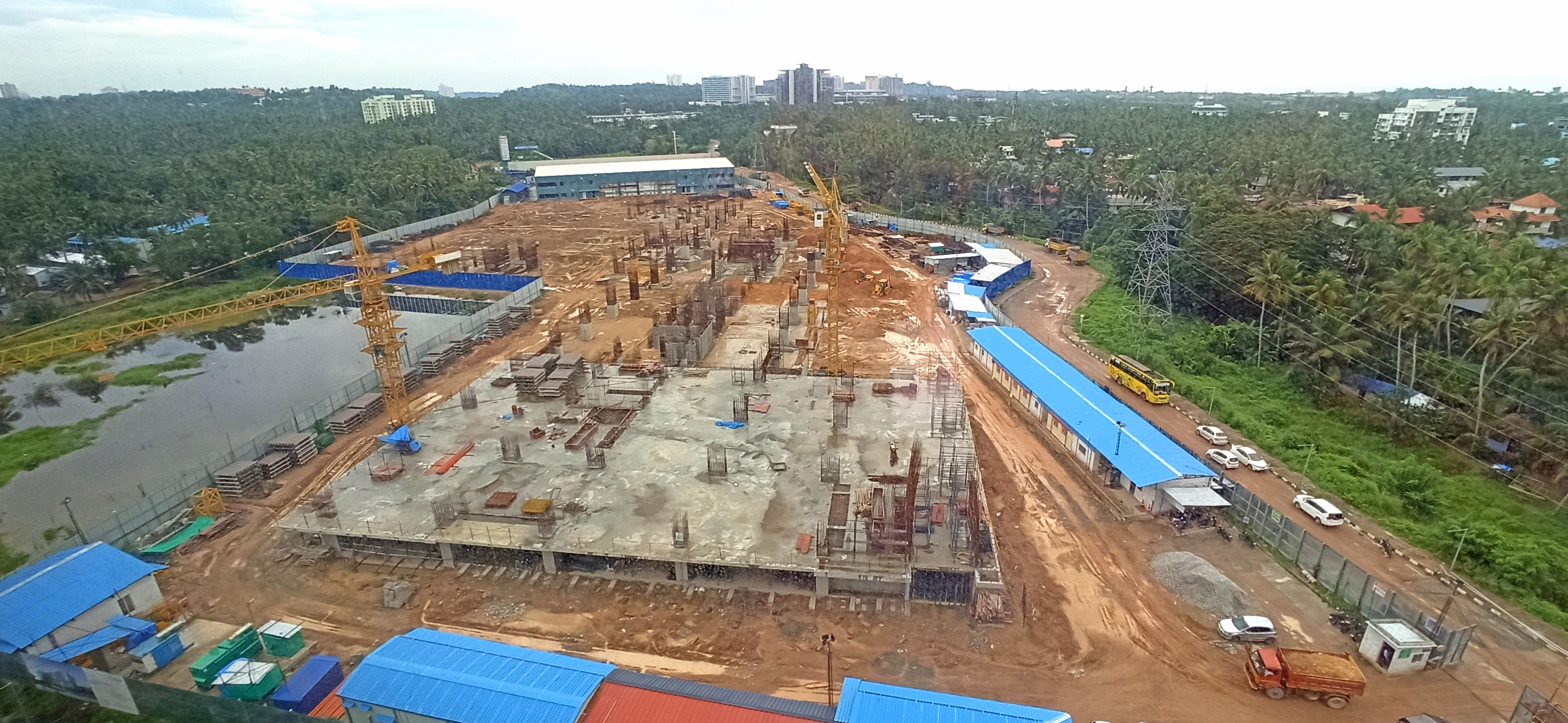
Technopark campus building being constructed by US-based Taurus Group

Technopark has acquired 86 acres (0.35 km^{2}) of land, for its Phase II expansion.

- Out of this, 50 acres (0.20 km^{2}) has been earmarked for Infosys and 36 acres (0.15 km^{2}) for UST Global.
  - Infosys is planning to create up to 2,500,000 square feet (230,000 m^{2}) of space to eventually accommodate up to 15,000 professionals. It plans to set up 600,000 sq ft (56,000 m^{2}) in the first phase.
  - UST Global was to set up a 32,000,000 square feet (3,000,000 m^{2}) campus to be completed by 2015. 800,000 square feet (74,000 m^{2}) of space was to be completed by January 2012. Work on the campus was started on 24 October 2007.
- Tata Consultancy Services has been allotted 25 acres (0.10 km^{2}) within the campus for their software development centre. This is in addition to the 14 acres (0.057 km^{2}) of land allotted to them for setting up their new training centre—Peepul Park.
- IBS Software Services is constructing a 450,000 sq ft (42,000 m^{2}) office on 5 acres (0.020 km^{2}) of land. The first phase of the campus was inaugurated on 23 October 2007.
- Tata Elxsi Limited, which is the product design arm of the US$68 billion Tata Group, has taken 3.5 acres (0.014 km^{2}) on which to build its design and development centre. The first phase of the campus was commissioned on 7 September 2007.
- The NeST group has also been allocated land to build a development centre, on which work has almost been completed.
- OXOMO Systems International is one of the fastest-growing IT company in the area, concentrating on software development, Digital Marketing, and IT outsourcing sectors.

=== Technopark Phase III ===
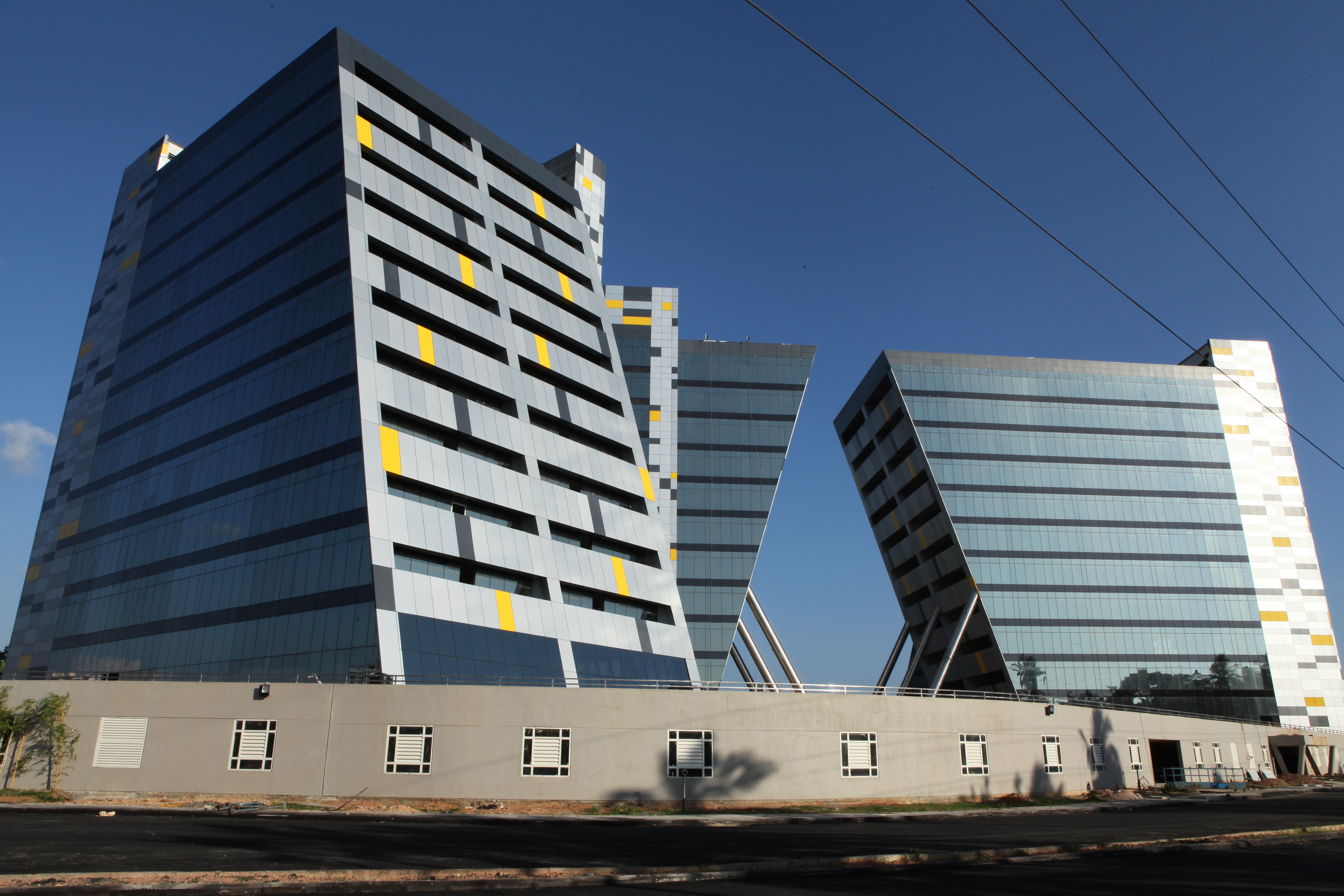
GANGA and YAMUNA of Technopark Phase III Campus

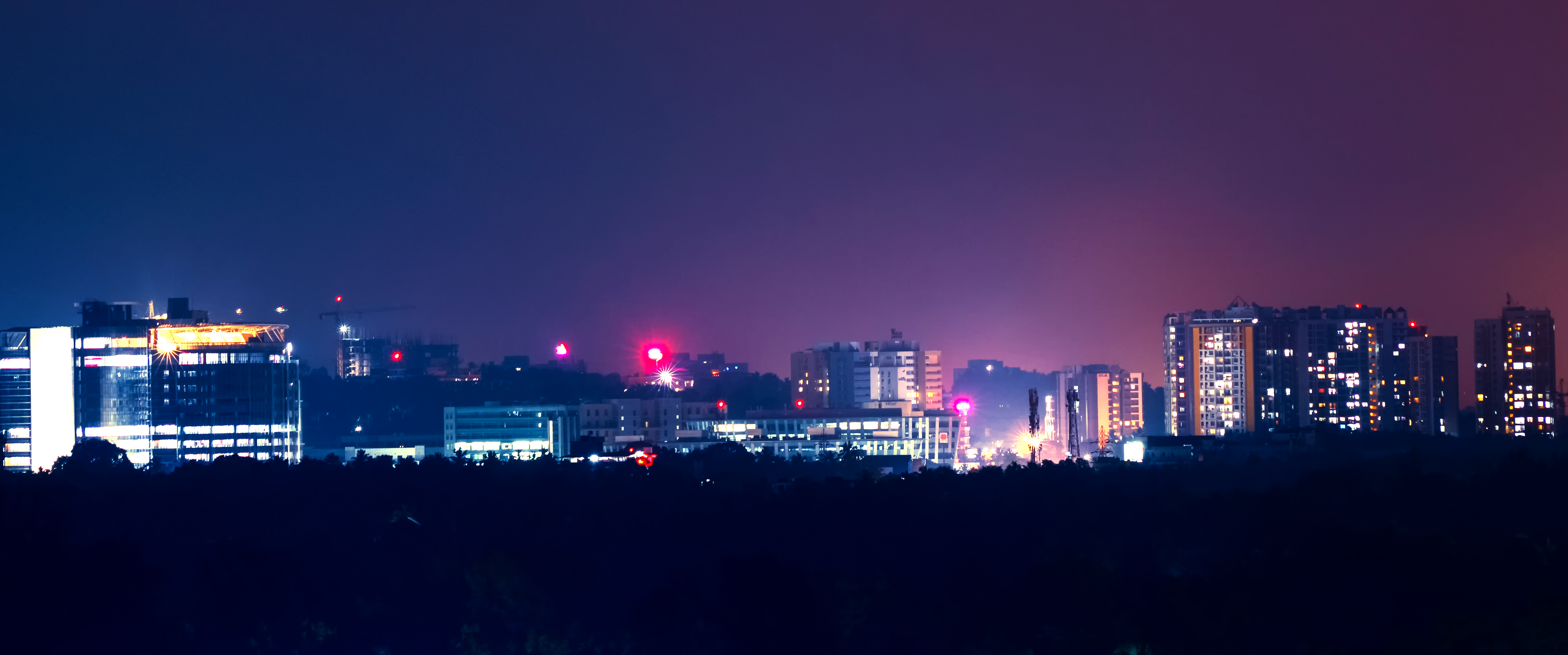
View towards Phase II Campus

Technopark has completed acquisition of 100 acres (0.40 km^{2}) of land for Phase III expansion. Firms like Larsen & Toubro and the Rahejas are planning major developments within and around Technopark as well. L&T has already announced its plans to set up a 35-acre (0.14 km^{2}) hybrid IT-and-residential park as part of Technopark Phase III. iGate (formerly Patni Computer Systems) has already announced that it will set up a Rs 150 crore ($US 32 million) development centre in Phase III.

The second and third phases of expansion of Technopark along with the ramping up of operations of the existing IT units are expected to see an investment of around Rs. 3000–4000 crore (US$0.75 billion) and an additional creation of 80,000–100,000 jobs.

Taurus Investment Holdings, along with its partners Embassy Group and Asset Homes, is building a mixed-use project that is to build 5,500,000 square feet (510,000 m^{2}) of floor space on 20 acres (8.1 ha) of land, as a part of Phase 3.

=== Phase IV expansion – Technocity ===
The fourth phase of Technopark is also referred to as the "Technocity" project. It involves a mixed use—IT, biotechnology, nanotechnology, commercial and residential development—spread over 500 acres (2.0 km^{2}) of land, about 5 km (3.1 mi) from the present campus. It will be a self-contained IT township with the potential to employ 100,000 people. The expected investment in the project is around Rs 60 billion (over US$1.5 billion), according to 2007 estimates.

Once Technocity's land acquisition is complete, Technopark will have an extent of close to 850 acres (3.4 km^{2}), making it one of India's largest IT satellite townships in terms of geographic area, comparable to that of projects like Mahindra World City in Chennai.

The government of Kerala has decided to partner with multiple private developers for Technocity and has formed a special company – Kerala State Information Technology Infrastructure Limited (KSITIL) – to take up the work. 204 acres (0.83 km^{2}) of the project area has already been acquired. A Request for Qualification was issued on 1 June 2008, and nine major developers, including international majors Emaar and Forest City Enterprises, have applied for qualification.

=== Special Economic Zones in Technopark ===
There are three Special Economic Zones (SEZs) inside Technopark. Each economic zone encompasses one of Phases I, II, or III. Phase IV will also become an SEZ once land acquisition is completed and will provide a range of economic benefits to the companies operating within Technopark.

=== Technopark Club ===
A sports and recreation club on the campus of Phase I provides diverse facilities for professionals to unwind. These include a gym; a swimming pool; and courts for basketball, badminton, table tennis, and beach volleyball. The club supports tour operators in organising recreational travel of employees and their families; it also has a massage parlour, Vaisakha, and a multi-cuisine restaurant.

=== Technopark Adventure Club ===
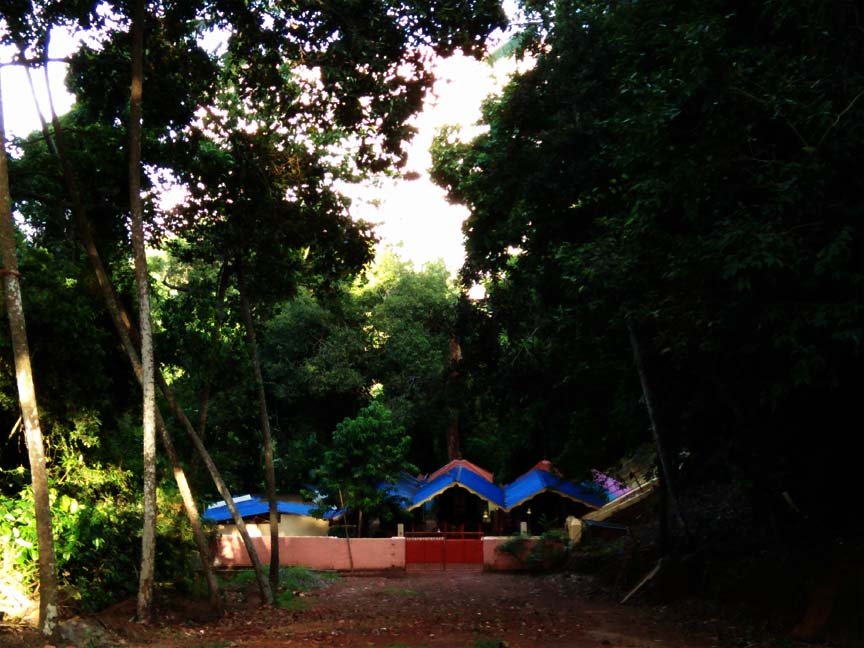
A small sacred grove inside the campus

The Technopark Adventure Club provides adventure activities to employees of Technopark and their families. It organises activities such as parasailing, rock climbing, rappelling, trekking and camping, paragliding. It administers a camp at Munnar, as well as corporate training camps.

=== Tech-A-Break ===
Tech-A-Break is Technopark's annual cultural extravaganza. Typically held over the course of a week, it kicks off with a Carnival parade and ends with performance by professional bands, dance groups, and musicians.

== In popular culture ==
The climactic scenes of the 1997 Malayalam film Superman were filmed in Technopark's Travancore Hall.

The 2009 Malayalam film Ritu was extensively shot on the Technopark campus.

== See also ==
- InfoPark, Kochi
- Kazhakoottam Railway Station
- Techno-lodge
- Technopark Kollam
- Digital Science Park, Thiruvananthapuram
- Technocity, Thiruvananthapuram
