= Aruna Sundararajan =

Former Telecom Secretary of India

Aruna Sundararajan IAS (Retd.)
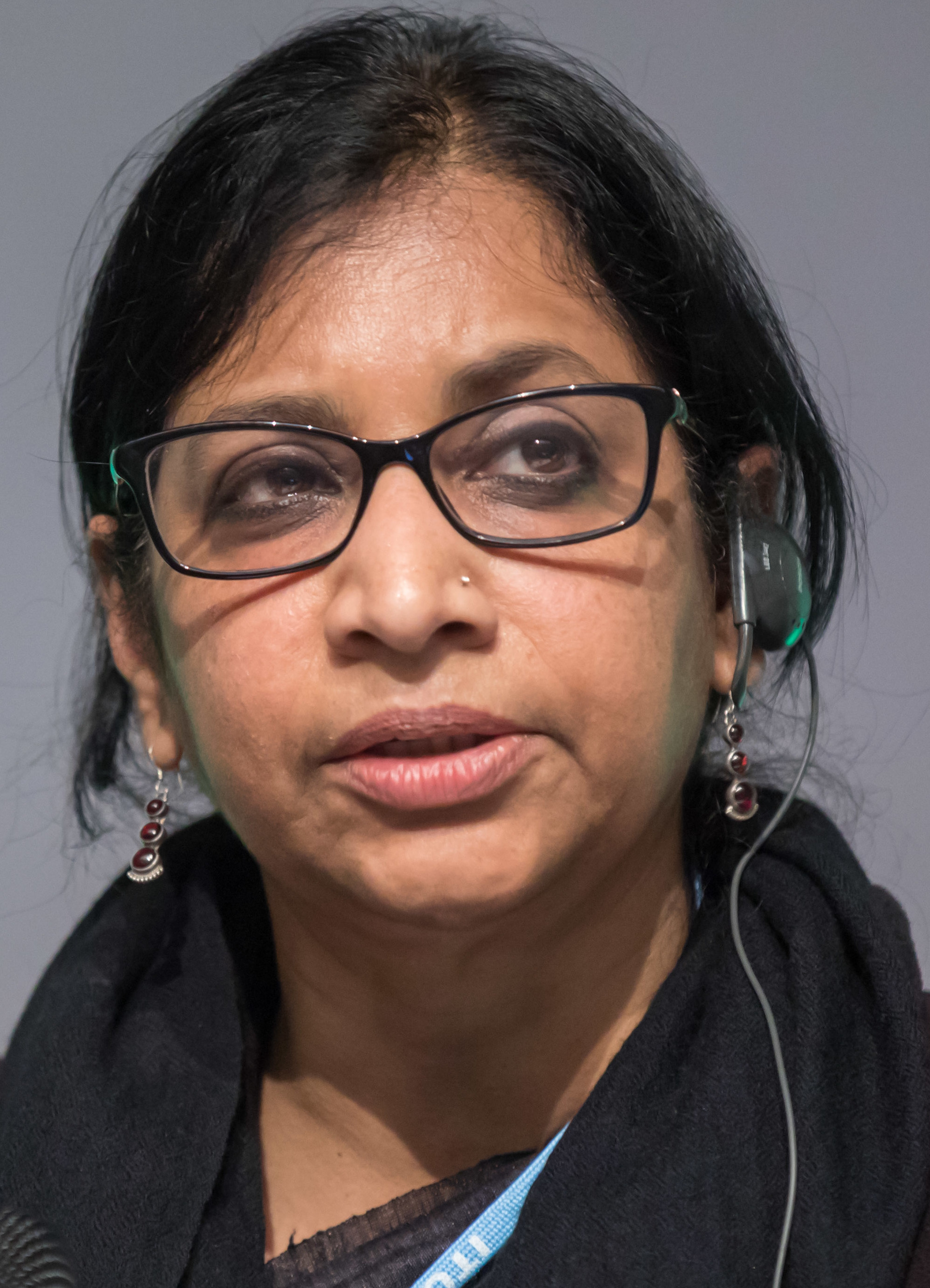

Telecom Secretary of India
- In office June 2017 – July 2019
- Preceded by: J.D Deepak
- Succeeded by: Anshu Prakash

Personal details
- Born: 12 July 1959 (age 66) Kerala, India
- Education: (M.A.) University of Madras (Diploma) (Public Admn.) École nationale d'administration
- Occupation: retired IAS officer
- Employer(s): Government of Kerala; Government of India
- Organization: Indian Administrative Service

Aruna Sundararajan (born 12 July 1959) is a retired 1982 batch Indian Administrative Service officer from Kerala cadre who served as the Telecom Secretary of India. She has over three decades of experience in a variety of leadership roles in the Central and State Governments, especially in Economic and Development Administration, Investment Promotion and IT/Telecom Domains.

== Career ==
Ms. Sundararajan was instrumental in establishing the IT department of Kerala way back in 1998. As Kerala's founding IT Secretary, she had conceived and spearheaded the Akshaya project, first started in the rural district of Malappuram, Kerala, India, and subsequently extended to the entire state. Akshaya was the largest e-literacy project of its kind where over 1 million people were trained in basic digital skills on a campaign mode. Akshaya also catalysed one of the largest known Internet Protocol (IP) based rural wireless networks in the world. Akshaya has received domestic and international acclaim as one of the most pioneering and digitally transformation projects globally. Ms. Sundararajan was also instrumental in establishing the IIITMK, and the InfoPark, Kochi, which changed the IT landscape of the state of Kerala and in initiating the SMART City project, Kochi. She had held many important positions including the Country Head of the Global E schools Initiative of the UN and CEO of the prestigious Common Service Centre Project under the National E-Governance Project, of the Government of India.

== Awards and honours ==
Ms.Sundararajan was honoured as one of the top professional women achievers by India Today in 2009 and by Forbes Business Magazine in Aug 2012. She was also honored with the USIBC Transformative Leadership Award 2017 for distinguished public service and her commitment to advancing U.S.-India cooperation and Digital India, constituted by the US-India Business Council.
