= 2020 Kerala gold smuggling case =

Smuggling case in India

- Venue: Thiruvananthapuram International Airport
- Location: Thiruvananthapuram, Kerala, India
- Type: Smuggling
- Inquiries: NIA, CBITC, ED
- Arrests: 8 (as of 1 November 2020)
- Suspects: Sarith Kumar, Swapna Suresh, Fazil Farid, Sandeep Nair, M.Sivasankar, Rashed Khamis Ali Musaiqri Alshemeli
- Charges: Smuggling

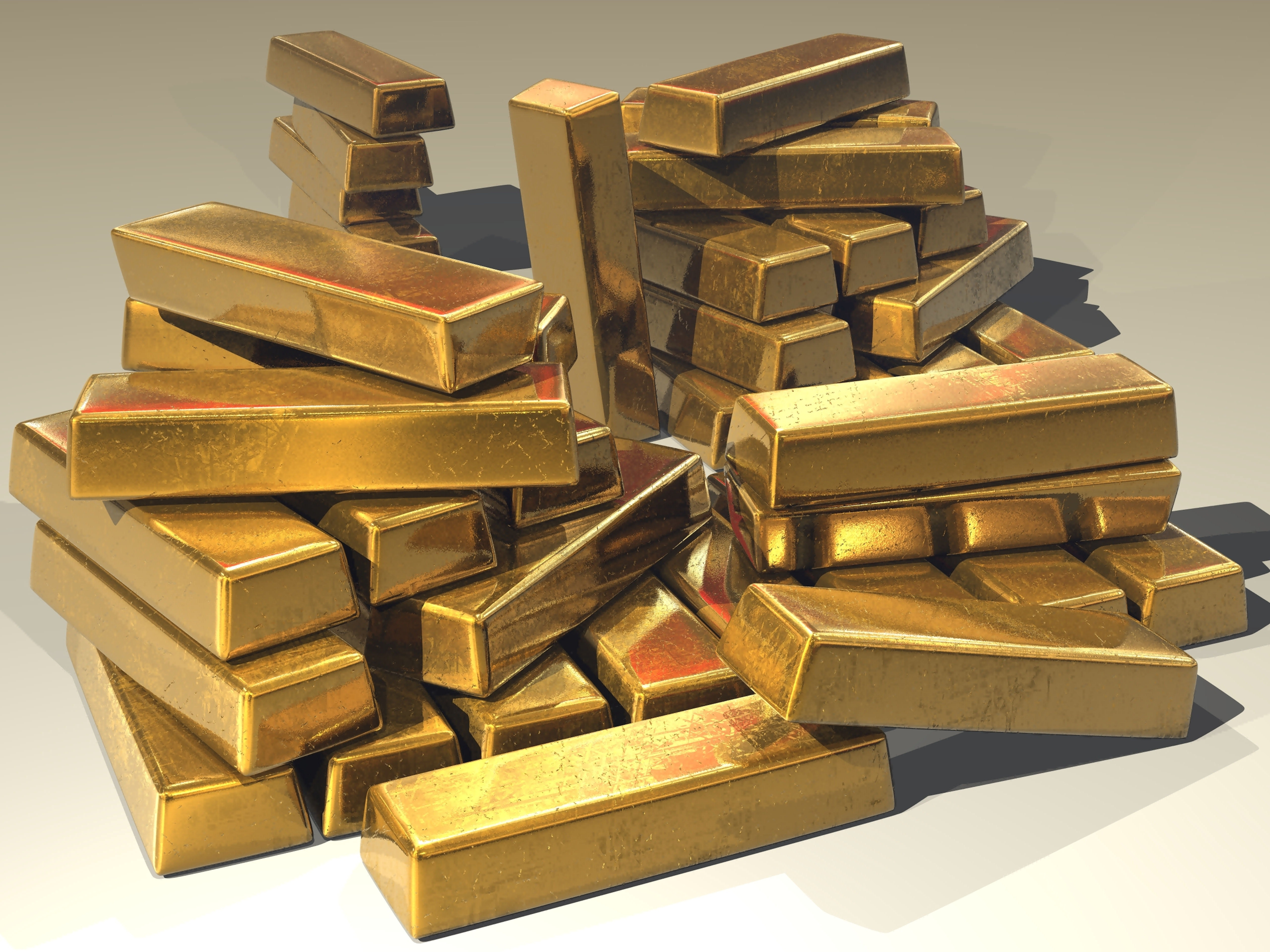
Gold smuggling was rampant in India until liberalisation, which repealed The Gold (Control) Act, 1968 that prohibited the import of gold except for making jewellery

On 5 July 2020, 30 kilograms (66 lb) of 24 carat gold worth ₹14.82 crores was seized by Central Board of Indirect Taxes and Customs at Thiruvananthapuram Airport from a diplomatic bag that was meant to be delivered to the UAE Consulate in Thiruvananthapuram.

M Sivasankar, the principal secretary to Kerala,in Pinarayi Vijayan lead LDF government, was suspended and removed from the post after preliminary inquiry confirmed that he had links with Swapna Suresh, one of the accused in the National Investigation Agency (NIA) probe.

== Background ==
Gold smuggling was rampant in India until liberalisation, which repealed The Gold (Control) Act, 1968 that prohibited the import of gold except for making jewellery.

In the 2011–12 period India's current account deficit burgeoned to 4.2% of its GDP. This was due to high prices of oil and gold, which the country imported in huge volumes. The government of India in response to this made a series of hikes in the import duty of gold. This created a lucrative ground for an upsurge in gold smuggling to the country from abroad, predominantly the Middle East. While most of the smuggled gold enters India from the UAE, it is also smuggled through the porous borders India shares with Nepal, Bangladesh, Bhutan, and Myanmar.

Multiple cases of gold smuggling were reported from Kerala in the past and in its initial days in the 1970s the smuggling was lower volumes transported through sea. However post 2012 there was a surge in gold smuggling into Kerala through airports. The prominence of Kerala Jewellery industry and high domestic demand for gold jewellery in state following Gulf migration by Keralites along with quick and high returns on engaging in Gold smuggling propelled Gold smuggling through Kerala. The smuggling and interception were more rampant through Calicut International Airport due to huge passenger traffic between the town and Gulf Cooperation Council nations which made concealment easier. In financial year 2013–14 the gold smuggled through Calicut airport was 70 kg in the previous year it was 12.5 kg only. The smuggling of gold using carriers were rampant in other nearby airports in region too such as Mangalore International Airport, Coimbatore International Airport, Cochin International Airport, Chennai Airport etc.

During the 2018–2019 fiscal year, customs had seized about 251 kg of gold from various airports in Kerala. In 2019–20, 540 kg was seized which was more than double compared to that of the previous year. About 802 cases, related to gold smuggling, were also registered in the same year. The various reports by Kerala Police suspect Koduvally town as a major hub used by smugglers. It is roughly estimated that around 70% of Gold that is smuggled through Calicut International Airport is handled by various players in the town. Over a period of time the smuggling activities has graduated from an economic offence to serious security threat to country, due to alleged cases of development of nexus between Smugglers and Non-state actors predominantly extremist organisations and violent mafia. It is also alleged that big jewellery brands from Kerala engage in trading smuggled gold by using small bogus outfits as front.

== Incident ==
On 30 June 2020, acting on an anonymous tip, the Customs officials at Trivandrum International Airport detained a diplomatic baggage from Dubai on suspicion of smuggling. Since the bag came under diplomatic immunity, opening it without following procedures was not possible, especially since a call claiming to be from secretary of the consulate general of the UAE consulate in Thiruvananthapuram asked the Customs to release the baggage.

On Sunday, 5 July 2020, the bag was opened in the presence of a senior officer from the high commissioner's office in Delhi and the consulate official whose name was on the baggage, to reveal the smuggled gold which weighed around 30 kg. The gold was concealed in baggage consisting of bathroom equipment. Further investigation about the call led the initial inquiry to Swapna Prabha Suresh, an ex-UAE consulate employee and state IT department consultant. The Indian officials said that it was first time in history that such a large scale smuggling attempt happened under the name of a foreign nation's diplomatic office.

== Investigation ==
On 10 July 2020, NIA took up investigation and registered FIR under Unlawful Activities (Prevention) Act against the 4 accused viz. Sarith Kumar, Swapna Suresh, Fazil Fareid, and Sandeep Nair. NIA subsequently arrested more persons connected with the case and seized many incriminating documents. Enforcement Directorate also initiated a probe into the case on the suspicion that the proceeds were used to fund terror activities. However, on 5 October, Swapna Suresh, the second accused was granted bail.

The accused was given statutory bail by the Economic Offences Court, Ernakulam, as the Customs could not file the final complaint within 60 days of arresting the accused.

On 15 October the NIA Special court granted bail for eight accused in the diplomatic baggage gold smuggling case while rejecting the application of two others.

Swapna Suresh, a former employee of UAE Consulate and one of the prime accused in the case, was a business development manager of a project undertaken by Space Park under Kerala State Information Technology Infrastructure Limited. She was appointed by PricewaterhouseCoopers as a temporary contractual employee. It is alleged that M Sivasankar recommended her for the post however no proof of the same has been found yet. It was also revealed during police investigation that she had faked her educational qualification because of which KSITIL decided to seek probe against PwC for appointing her. Swapna is also accused of aiding financial discrepancies in an apartment construction project in Vadakanchery. An internal vigilance investigation was ordered by the state government on these allegations. Immediately after this, a CBI probe was initiated at an unprecedented speed based on a complaint letter sent by Vadakanchery's Indian National Congress MLA stating that Foreign Contribution (Regulation) Act, 2010 was violated. However High Court stayed this investigation by the CBI after it was revealed that the project in question does not come under FCRA.

NIA identified K.T. Ramees, a businessman from Malappuram who was earlier arrested by the customs, as the kingpin of the operation. According to a report by India Today, Ramees is a relative of the former Education minister, Chakkeeri Ahamed Kutty, and Malappuram MP P.K. Kunhalikutty. According to customs, Ramees is also an accused in other unconnected cases involving poaching and smuggling.

Fazil Fareed, the third accused in the case, and the person who allegedly sent the consignment to the UAE consulate was arrested and questioned by the Dubai police. It is alleged that Fazil Fareed also produced some south Indian films.

== Bureaucrats questioned ==
- M Sivashankar, an IAS officer was in the centre of the scandal due to his association with the accused Swapna Suresh. Sivashankar was removed from the posts of Principal Secretary to the Chief Minister and Information Technology (IT) secretary after reports of his association with Swapna Suresh, charged by the National Investigation Agency in the smuggling racket. The court hearing the case has however expressed displeasure over the lack of evidence justifying the arrest of the IAS officer despite months of investigation and multiple rounds of questioning. It was also recorded in court that ED had pressured the officer to name political targets.

== TV journalist questioned ==
- Anil Nambiar, a TV journalist and coordinating editor of Janam TV has been questioned by Enforcement Directorate of India in connection with Gold smuggling on 27 August 2020. He was in touch with accused Swapna Suresh on 5 July, the day Customs recovered the smuggled gold. Two pages of a leaked document, part of the statement given by Swapna Suresh to the Customs and submitted in the Economic Offences Court in a sealed envelope appeared in the media. As per her statement, Anil asked her to get a press release issued from the consulate general claiming that it was not diplomatic baggage which contained gold, but a private baggage. But this plan could allegedly not be followed through by the parties involved.

== Reactions ==
Following the issue, Ahmed Al Banna, UAE's ambassador to India, told the media that he will coordinate with officials in Kerala for the investigation into the incident. UAE embassy released an official statement that said that the gold smuggling in Trivandrum and its diplomatic role had no role in the matter. The statement said the embassy "condemns the attempted misuse of diplomatic channels by an individual engaged in smuggling activity" and "firmly rejected such acts". However, the UAE consulate's admin attache left the country on 12 June 2020, even before National Investigation Agency could question him.

The Congress party demanded the resignation of Pinarayi Vijayan over the alleged involvement of his office in the case. Ramesh Chennithala, opposition leader in state legislative, stated that "the current government in the state has tarnished the image of Kerala worldwide". Mullappally Ramachandran, state chief of the congress party, demanded a probe by RAW. UDF, a coalition led by the Congress party, also organised an online sit-in protest.

Bharatiya Janata Party, the party leading the coalition ruling the country has organised hunger strikes seeking resignation of Chief Minister of Kerala. Several prominent leaders of the party including V. Muraleedharan, Minister of state for External Affairs, took part in the hunger strike.

CPI(M), the party ruling the state, accused that the central Minister of State for External Affairs V. Muraleedharan was trying to interfere with the investigation by claiming that the gold seized was not diplomatic cargo. His claim was allegedly proven wrong when the Finance Ministry informed the Parliament that the gold was smuggled through diplomatic baggage. CPI(M) state secretariat said that "Muraleedharan does not have the right to remain in office and should resign" and that "smuggling through diplomatic channels had become rampant after Muraleedharam assumed office". The party said that Swapna Suresh, the key accused had given a statement to the NIA that the head of Janam TV, Anil Nambiar, had asked her to tell the customs officials that the baggage was not a diplomatic one. The party also raised the fact that some members of the Customs investigation team were removed from the case after he was questioned. Chief Minister Pinarayi Vijayan stated that "Muraleedharan was not functioning as per the position he is holding".
