= Digital Science Park, Thiruvananthapuram =

First digital science park in India under construction

The Digital Science Park at Thiruvananthapuram, Kerala being constructed will be first digital science park in India. In the 2022−23 state budget, the Government of Kerala announced four science parks with an investment of Rs 1000 crore to utilize the achievements in the field of science and technology. The first park among those is being set up close to the Digital University of Kerala at Technopark Phase IV-Technocity. The foundation stone of the park was laid on 25 April 2023 by Prime Minister Narendra Modi.

== Overview ==
The park is being constructed on a 13.93-acre land near the Kerala University of Digital Sciences Innovation and Technology as part of the Technopark Phase IV-Technocity. It is India's first third-generation digital science park. The construction of the park is expected to be completed in 2026. It will create and use a communications network overlay built on a triple helix integrating universities, industry, and government. The park will initially support commercial and industry units as well as technological startups in the fields of robotics, artificial intelligence, smart hardware, electronics, sustainable materials etc. The park will have two buildings of total area 2 lakh square feet. While the second building would contain administrative functions as well as a centre for digital experiences, the first structure, with a floor area of 1.5 lakh square feet, will have five floors and house centres of excellence comprising research labs and digital incubators. The total cost of the project is estimated at Rs 1515 crore. Apart from the Rs 200 crore sanctioned by the state government, the remaining funds are raised from other sources including industry partners. ARM, a UK-based semiconductor and software design company, has signed an agreement with Kerala Digital University for academic, research and start-up related activities. The AI center at the park will focus on responsible AI hardware and software issues. Multinational American technology company NVIDIA will join as a partner of the project. The Universities of Manchester, Oxford and Edinburgh have signed MoUs with the Digital University to participate in the development of the park.

== Commencement of Operation ==
The formal commencement of operation of the Digital Science Park was inaugurated on 1 August 2023 by the Chief Minister of Kerala, Pinarayi Vijayan. The operations of the science [park is carried out the Kabani building of Technopark Phase IV at Technocity, Thiruvananthapuram.

== See also ==
- Technocity, Thiruvananthapuram
- Technopark, Trivandrum
- Kerala University of Digital Sciences, Innovation and Technology
