= Sajan Pillai =

Indian-American businessman and investor

- Born: Kerala, India
- Occupations: Chairman and CEO of McLaren Strategic Ventures
- Known for: Former CEO of UST

Sajan Pillai is an India-born American businessman and investor. He is the former CEO of UST, which he helped build into a company employing over 25,000 people. He is currently the founder, chairman, and CEO of McLaren Strategic Ventures.

== Career ==
Sajan Pillai was a part of the founding team of UST in 1999 and later became CEO. He is co-credited with building the firm into an information technology giant employing 25,000 people, catering to Fortune 500 companies, and generating revenue of more than $1 billion. As CEO, Pillai launched a program called Step It Up America, which trained minority women to work in STEM and IT sectors.

He retired from UST in 2019 to start McLaren Strategic Ventures and Season Two Ventures. As part of his investment venture, Pillai has invested $300 million towards development of chip design and product engineering projects in the United States.
