= Kerala State IT Mission =

Part of state government in India

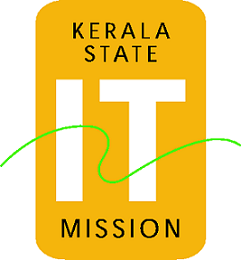
- Type: Autonomous Institution
- Industry: Information Technology, E-governance
- Founded: 1999; 27 years ago
- Founder: Government of Kerala
- Headquarters: Saankethika, Vrindavan Gardens, Pattom. P.O, Thiruvananthapuram, 695004, Kerala
- Key people: P.K. Kunhalikutty (Minister for Information Technology); Seeram Sambasiva Rao IAS (Special Secretary (E & ITD) / Chairman KSITM); Sachin Kumar Yadav IAS(Director)
- Parent: Electronics & Information Technology Department
- Website: https://itmission.kerala.gov.in/

Kerala State IT Mission (KSITM) is part of the Department of Electronics and Information Technology, Government of Kerala (renamed as the “Department of Information Technology, Artificial Intelligence and Future Technologies”). Its headquarters is at Thiruvananthapuram. Kerala State IT Mission is a team of professionals from the industry and the Government and is headed by the Director, with the Secretary-IT as the chairman.

The Governing body of KSITM is chaired by the Hon’ble Minister for IT. The Principal Secretary – IT is the chairman of the executive committee of KSITM. The Director KSITM is the Convener of the meetings of the General Body and executive committee.

KSITM performs diverse roles including, e-governance and development of human resources, disseminating information across citizens and Government, interfacing between Government and industry, bridging digital divide, investor interactions and achieving speed and transparency in governance. The activity of thrust is e-governance; conceptualization and implementation have been guided by citizen centricity and enhancing citizens’ efficiency. KSITM has a staff strength of about 150 plus employees.

== History ==
It was established in 1999 under the Department of Information Technology, Government of Kerala for providing managerial support for various initiatives for the government. It is a Society registered under the Travancore Cochin Literary Scientific & Charitable Societies Registration Act (Act 12 of 1955).

Directors
Sl. No.	Name	From	To
1	SEERAM SAMBASIVA RAO IAS		
2	CHITRA S IAS		
3	SNEHIL KUMAR SINGH IAS		
4	K MOHAMMED Y SAFIRULLA IAS		
5	VINAY GOYAL IAS		
6	ANU KUMARI IAS		
7	SANDEEP KUMAR IAS		
8	SACHIN KUMAR YADAV IAS		

== Unified Service Delivery Platform ==
The Unified Service Delivery Platform (USDP) is the core technological framework powering Nammude Keralam, a citizen-centric digital governance initiative of the Government of Kerala. The platform is designed to provide a single, integrated interface for accessing government services across multiple departments.

Through USDP, the portal consolidates more than 100 departmental and utility services into a unified digital system. The integration enables standardized service workflows, secure authentication mechanisms, and interoperability between departmental databases. The initiative aims to enhance efficiency, transparency, and accessibility in public service delivery by reducing fragmentation across government platforms.

== See also ==
- Akshaya project
