= Dreamz Infotainments =

Indian quiz society

- Type: Education
- Established: 2000
- Location: Kozhikode, Kerala, India
- Website: http://www.quizkerala.com/

Dreamz Infotainments Quiz Society is the first and the only registered quiz society in Kerala. The society was created to promote quizzing culture in Kerala by organizing contests, creating quiz books and conducting quiz workshops in India. Reverberates, the largest annual quiz contest in Kerala, is hosted by Dreamz Infotainments since 2006. Dreamz also hosts the regional round of World Quizzing Championship, conducted by the International Quizzing Association in Kerala since 2008.

== History ==
Dreamz quiz club was started in 2000 by a few youngsters from Kerala. It was registered as a society in 2009. The headquarters of Dreamz is in Singapore, and its registered office operates from Meenchanda, Kozhikode. The society is headed by quizmaster Snehaj Srinivas.

== Events ==
Dreamz Infotainments hosts quizzes in Kerala for schools, colleges and general public. The highest participation in the World Quizzing Championship in 2012 was in the Kozhikode regional event conducted by Dreamz Infotainments. Dreamz has conducted Arogyatarakam, helmed by Snehaj Srinivas, a series of health quizzes, in association with NRHM and C-DIT in 2012. A women's wing of Dreamz, named Qute Quizzica was established in 2011.

=== Reverberate ===
Reverberate is the annual quiz contest hosted by Dreamz Infotainments. It was first conducted in 2006. The first three editions were one-day events. The third and fourth editions were conducted over two days. The fifth edition was the longest; it lasted six days. The sixth edition of Reverberates was conducted along with the World Quizzing Championship's 2012 edition. After that University of Calicut decided to conduct the quiz series every year as an official event. The 2013 event had a total of 20 quizzes including the All Kerala inter University Quiz.
