= Dudgeon Offshore Wind Farm =

Offshore wind farm off the coast of Norfolk, England

Dudgeon Wind Farm
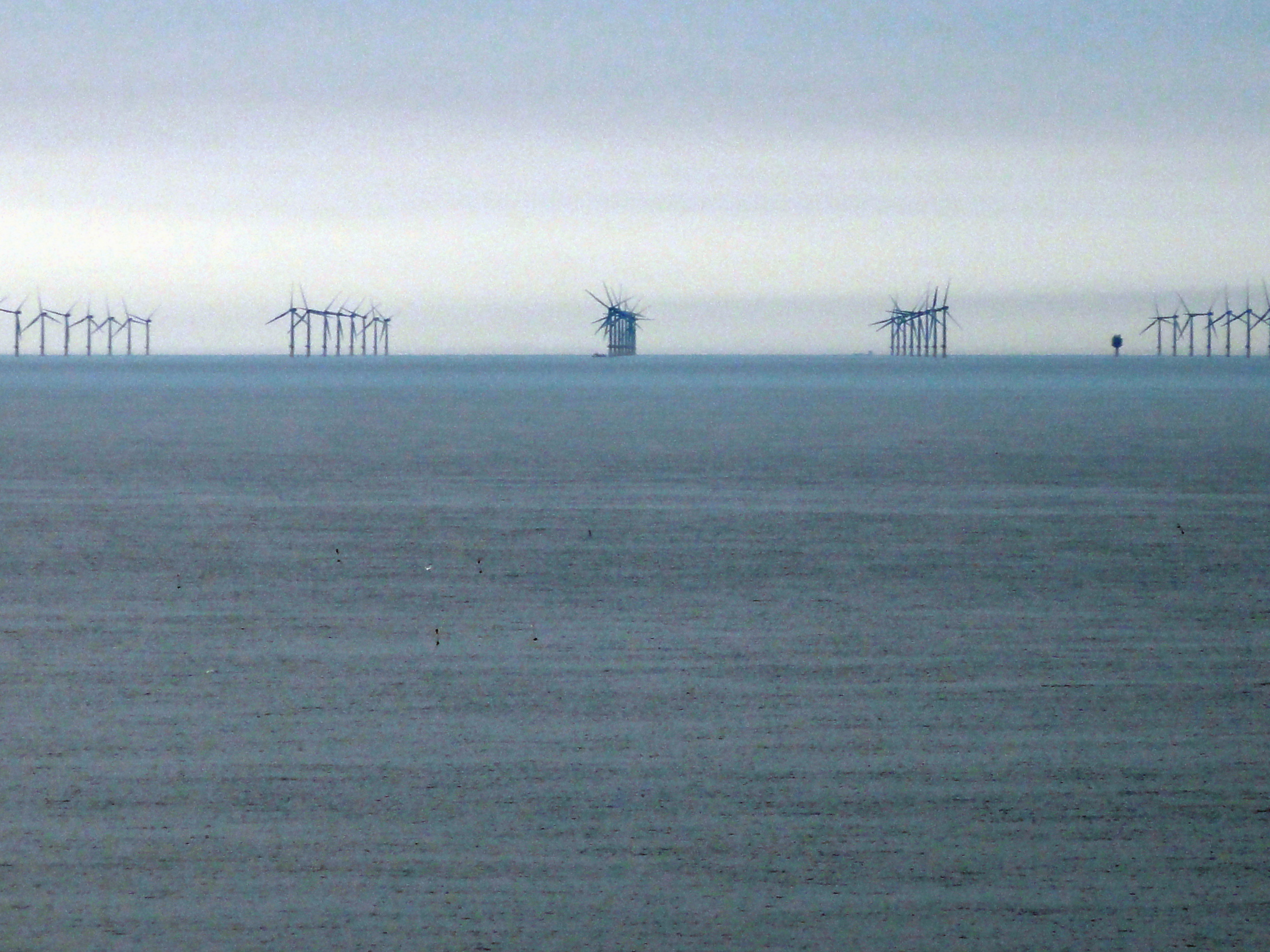
- Country: United Kingdom
- Location: 32km north of Cromer, Norfolk
- Coordinates: 53°14′56″N 1°23′24″E
- Status: Operational
- Commission date: October 2017
- Owners: Equinor; Masdar

Wind farm
- Type: Offshore
- Max. water depth: 18-25 m
- Distance from shore: 32 km (20 mi)
- Hub height: 110 m (360 ft)
- Rotor diameter: 154 m (505 ft)

Power generation
- Units operational: 67 × 6 MW
- Make and model: Siemens Gamesa SWT-6.0-154 (67)
- Nameplate capacity: 402 MW
- Capacity factor: 48%
- Annual net output: 1.7 TW·h

External links
- Website: dudgeonoffshorewind.co.uk

Wind farm layout

Dudgeon Offshore Wind Farm is an offshore wind farm 32 km north of Cromer off the coast of Norfolk, in the North Sea, England. It is owned by Dudgeon Offshore Wind Limited (DOW), a subsidiary of Equinor, Masdar and Statkraft. The site is a relatively flat area of seabed between the Cromer Knoll and Inner Cromer Knoll sandbanks and is one of the furthest offshore sites around the UK.

The project included constructing the wind turbines and their foundations, building an offshore substation and an onshore substation at Necton, installing power cables both undersea and onshore, as well as connection to the UK National Grid. This work is estimated to have cost in the region of £1.5bn. The wind farm was fully commissioned in October 2017. The estimated annual production is 1.7 TWh which corresponds to 410,000 homes each using 4,100 kWh/yr. With a nameplate capacity (peak power) of 402 MW this corresponds to a capacity factor of 48%, or an average power of approximately 200 MW.

== Planning ==
The project was originally developed by Warwick Energy Limited, who set up a subsidiary called Dudgeon Offshore Wind Limited. The wind farm planning application was filed in April 2009. The application was for between 56 and 168 turbines depending on final chosen design with a nameplate capacity of 560 MW.

In July 2012 the government gave planning approval for Warwick Energy to construct a wind farm to the capacity of 560MW. In October 2012 Statoil and Statkraft acquired the Dudgeon Offshore Wind Farm project through the acquisition of all shares from Warwick Energy. A review of the project was undertaken after the project was acquired by Statoil and Statkraft, and in December 2013 it was announced that the capacity of the wind farm would be reduced from 560MW to 402MW.

In January 2014 it was announced that two contracts had been awarded to Siemens for the engineering, supply, assembly, commissioning and service of 67 6MW wind turbines for the project. The rotor diameter of this turbine is 154 m, the hub height is 110 m and the highest point of the rotor is 187 m. Statoil and Statkraft made the final investment decision on 1 July 2014 and announced that they would proceed with the project.

In September 2014 it was announced that Masdar had purchased 35%, half of Statoil's shares, of Dudgeon Offshore Wind Limited. Statoil now holds a 35% share, Masdar a 35% share and Statkraft a 30% share in Dudgeon Offshore Wind Limited.

== Construction ==
Work began onshore in Norfolk to install the underground cables and construct the substations on March 26, 2015. The turbine foundations were laid in 2016, with turbine installation occurring in 2017, the first came on line in early February 2017 and last completed by September 2017.

Final commissioning occurred in October 2017.

== Service and maintenance ==
In late 2014 the Danish company Esvagt was awarded a 5-year contract for service and maintenance. The Service Operation Vessel (SOV) Esvagt Njord has handled the task, and as the first of this kind on a British offshore wind farm, all facilities like workshops, storage facilities and accommodation for up to 40 wind turbine technicians from Siemens and Statoil are located on the ship. The wind turbine technicians live on the ship and walk to work on the wind turbines via the Norwegian UpTime gangway system. The vessel was delivered to Great Yarmouth on 6 September 2016, from where it is operating.
