= Technocity, Thiruvananthapuram =

Indian technology park

Coordinates: 8°36′48″N 76°51′12″E

Technocity Trivandrum
- Type: Joint Sector
- Industry: Information technology Business Park
- Genre: Infrastructure Service Provider
- Headquarters: Pallipuram, Thiruvananthapuram, India
- Area served: 500 acres
- Key people: M Vasudevan, Senior Business Development Manager
- Owner: Government of Kerala
- Parent: Technopark Trivandrum

Technocity is a technology park that is an integrated township currently under construction in Thiruvananthapuram, India dedicated to electronics, software, and other information technology (IT). It was conceived in 2005 as the fourth phase of development of Technopark. Technocity is a complete IT City, spread across about 500 acres (200 hectares), which includes not just space for IT/ITES firms but also residential, commercial, hospitality, medical, and educational facilities. The project is a new self-dependent satellite city, which would not strain the resources and infrastructure of the city of Thiruvananthapuram.

The units in Technocity include a wide variety of companies engaged in a range of activities, which include embedded software development, enterprise resource planning (ERP), process control software design, engineering and computer-aided design software development, IT Enabled Services (ITES), process re-engineering, animation and e-business. The firms will include domestic companies as well as subsidiaries of multi-national organisations.

Technocity is being jointly developed by the Government of Kerala and private developers. The Government is represented by Technopark and a special company called the Kerala State Information Technology Infrastructure Limited (KSITIL). Individual phases of the project will be developed as Special Purpose Vehicles (SPVs) between KSITIL and individual developers. KSITIL plans to hold 26% equity share in all the SPVs. Once fully operational, Technocity is expected to create about 200,000 employment opportunities.

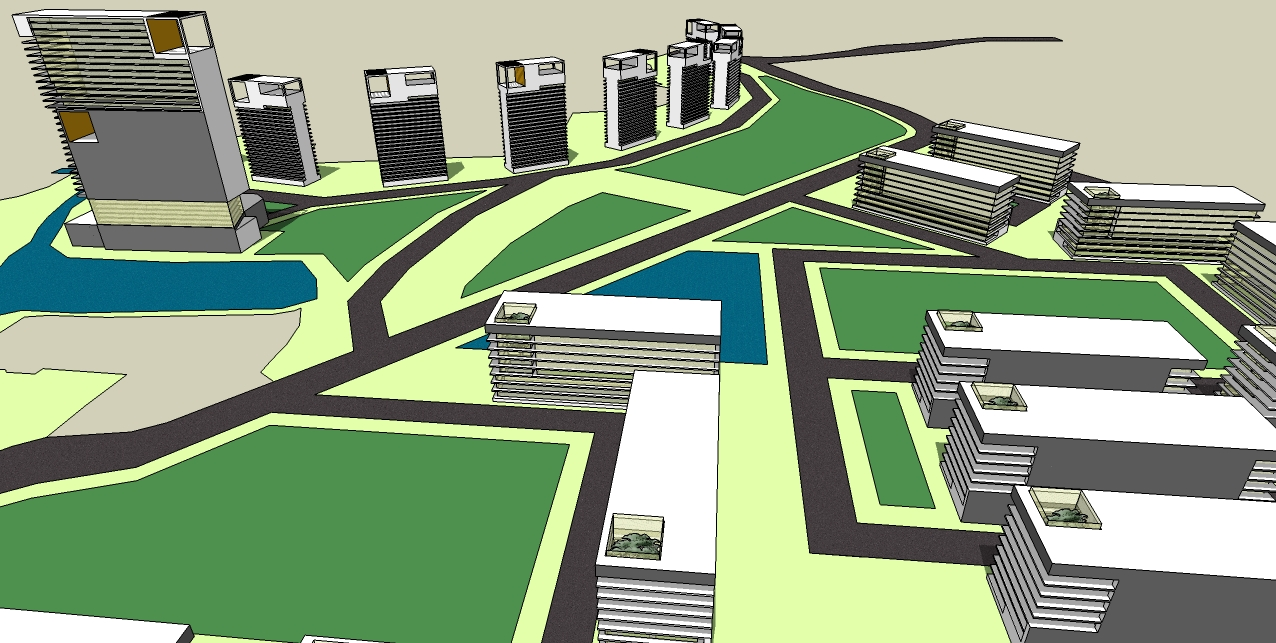
Artist's view of Technocity

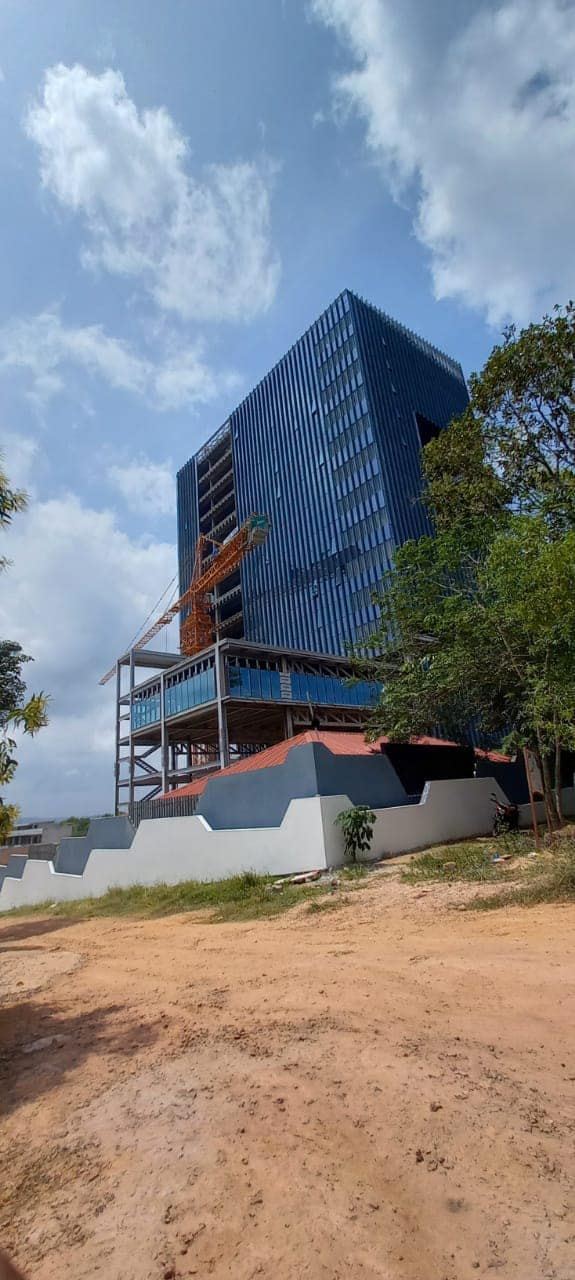
SunTec building in Technocity

== Infrastructure ==
Technocity provides infrastructure and support facilities for IT/ITES and electronics companies. This is done either directly or through private partners. In addition, Technocity, like Technopark, may provide business incubation facilities.

=== IT Space ===
Technocity will have up to 20 million square feet (1.9 million square meters) of built-up space within multiple buildings for its tenant organisations. This facility will be developed in phases across as many as 10 years.

=== Non-IT Space ===
Technocity is being developed as an Integrated Township and it will include residential space, commercial space, retail facilities, multiplexes, hospitals and schools.

=== Utilities and support facilities ===
Technocity will supply electricity through a 220 KV, 100 MVA dedicated internal power sub-station and distribution system with built-in redundancies at all levels. The water supply will be from a dedicated treatment plant while there will be a sewage treatment plant built especially for Technocity. All these facilities will be developed by KSITIL and Technopark for the entire area.

=== Connectivity ===
Thiruvananthapuram is connected to the National Internet Backbone and Technocity will be serviced by a variety of bandwidth providers, including Reliance Infocomm, Bharti Airtel, Videsh Sanchar Nigam and Asianet Dataline, through fibre optic lines in the campus.

FLAG Telecom—a subsidiary of Reliance Infocomm—has landed its FALCON global cable system at Thiruvananthapuram, providing direct connectivity to the Maldives and Sri Lanka. Technocity will be connected through fiber link, in self-healing redundant ring architecture to Reliance Internet Data Center and Gateway at Mumbai, directly connecting to FLAG, the undersea cable system backbone that connects 134 countries including the U.S., U.K., Middle East and Asia Pacific. This provides connectivity with the Middle East, South East Asia, Far East, Europe and North America.

== Institutions ==
Technocity will host at least two educational and research institutes. The Indian Institute of Information Technology and Management–Kerala (IIITM–K), which has now being upgraded to Kerala University of Digital sciences, Innovation, and Technology, has been allocated 10 acres (4 hectares) in Technocity to develop its own campus. IIITM–K is an institution of higher education, research and development in applied information technology and management. In addition to providing post graduate courses in Information Technology, IIITM–K has assisted in educational networking and in setting up web portals which benefit the community. Portals for computational chemistry and agricultural information dissemination are among its focus areas. IIITM–K is located at present in Technopark, Thiruvananthapuram.

The Asian School of Business (ASB) is an institution of post graduate management education. It was started in 2005. The ASB is currently located inside Technopark and plans to move to a campus in Technocity by 2020–21. ASB offers the full-time Post Graduate Programme in Management (PGPM). The Asian School of Business is managed by a Board of Governors which includes stalwarts of the Indian IT industry like Tata Consultancy Services CEO S. Ramadorai and Infosys CEO Kris Gopalakrishnan.

== Phases of Development ==
Technocity will be developed in multiple phases by a number of private developers in association with KSITIL and Technopark. The developers will chosen through global bidding as each phase becomes ready to be developed.

The proposed TCS Learning Campus in Thiruvananthapuram will be located on a 97-acre property in the Technopark area of the city. The campus will be built over an area of 6.1 million square feet and feature residential accommodation for students and faculty at the center.

=== Phase I ===
KSITIL has called for the Request for Proposal to develop about 60 acres (0.23 km².) of land as mixed-use IT/ITES park on 16 October 2008. This will be the First Phase of Technocity.

Nine major developers had qualified for the bid including the Indian subsidiary of the world's leading developer - Emaar Properties, a consortium of Forest City Enterprises and Sun Group, K.Raheja Corporation, Larsen and Toubro, Suzlon, Maytas Infrastructure and the Brigade Group.

=== Special Economic Zones in Technocity ===
There are plans for nine Special Economic Zones (SEZs) within Technocity. These will be developed by multiple developers in association with KSITIL and Technopark. One SEZ has been set apart for development by Technopark itself.

== See also ==
- Digital Science Park, Thiruvananthapuram
- Technopark, Trivandrum
