= Anshu Prakash =

Civil Servant

Telecom secretary
- In office 1 August 2019 – 30 September 2021
- Preceded by: Aruna Sundararajan
- Succeeded by: K.Rajaraman

Chief Secretary of Delhi
- In office 4 December 2017 – 18 November 2018
- Lieutenant Governor: Anil Baijal
- Chief Minister: Arvind Kejriwal
- Preceded by: M. M. Kutty
- Succeeded by: Vijay Kumar Dev

Personal details
- Born: 20 September 1961 (age 65) Delhi, India
- Education: St. Stephen's College, Delhi University; Faculty of Management Studies – University of Delhi
- Occupation: IAS
- Profession: Civil servant

Anshu Prakash (born 20 September 1961; IAST: Aṃśu Prakāśa) is a retired 1986 batch civil servant of the Indian Administrative Service (IAS) cadre of Arunachal Pradesh-Goa-Mizoram-Union Territories (AGMUT) cadre. He served as the Chief Secretary of Delhi from 4 December 2017 to 18 November 2018. He also served as secretary in the telecom department of the Ministry of Communications (India) from 1 August 2019 to 30 September 2021 .

== Education ==
Prakash completed his BA in economics from the St. Stephen's College at the University of Delhi, and also has an MBA degree from Faculty of Management Studies – University of Delhi at the University of Delhi.

== Career ==
Prakash has served in various key positions for both the Government of India and the governments of his cadre, such as Chief Secretary of Delhi, Principal Secretary (Health and Family Welfare), additional commissioner in the now-trifurcated Municipal Corporation of Delhi, chairman and managing director of Delhi Transport Corporation, secretary of New Delhi Municipal Council, Registrar of Cooperative Societies in the Government of NCT of Delhi, district magistrate and collector of a district in the Government of Goa, and as Additional Secretary and Financial Adviser in the Ministry of Rural Development, additional secretary in Department of Heavy Industries of Ministry of Heavy Industries and Public Enterprises, joint secretary in Ministry of Health and Family Welfare, and as a director in the Department of Economic Affairs of Ministry of Finance and Company Affairs in the Indian government.

He has also served as, on different occasions, as the private secretary of the Minister of Health and Family Welfare and the Minister of Information and Broadcasting.

=== Chief Secretary of Delhi ===
Prakash was appointed as the Chief Secretary of Delhi in December 2017, he assumed that office on 5 December 2017. He was transferred to the department of telecommunication on 18 November 2018.

== Controversies ==
Prakash was allegedly manhandled by members of the Delhi Legislative Assembly from the Aam Aadmi Party (AAP) in February 2018. AAP countered Prakash's claim by saying that he had stated "He is not responsible to the chief minister or the MLAs", adding that Prakash had "used bad language against some MLAs and left without answering any questions".
