= Gold business in Thrissur =

Business in Indian city

The Gold business in Thrissur is a major revenue earner for the economy of Kerala, India. About 500,000 kg of gold jewellery is manufactured every year in state, the majority of which is done in Thrissur, making the city a hub of gold business and gold jewellery manufacturing in Kerala and South India. All major jewellery groups in Kerala have manufacturing facility and showrooms in Thrissur.

== History ==
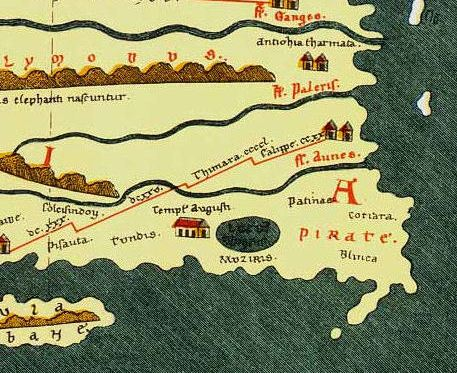
Muziris, as shown in the Tabula Peutingeriana, with a "Templum Augusti".

Thrissur's destiny with gold started a long way back with Roman and Arab traders in the lost port city of Muziris in Kodungallur. The bad days of goldsmiths started when Economic liberalisation in India began in 1990's. The repeal of the Gold Control Act, introduction of provisions relating to gold in the Foreign Exchange Regulation Act, 1973, and the grant of permission to Non-Resident Indians (NRIs) to bring in up to 5 kg, subsequently raised to 10 kg of gold on payment of a small duty in foreign exchange. This was the last nail in the coffin of the goldsmiths.

The de-regulated gold sector offered a huge opportunity for businesspersons from Thrissur and India. Some of the goldsmiths turned into businessman and later into wholesale dealers of gold jewellery. But the sector was lacking from employment problem. Most of the traditional goldsmith families next generation opted out from this old profession. Thus it attracted unskilled workers which in turn ran most of the jewellery business in Kerala now. But that change was short-lived. Craftsmen from West Bengal and Orissa were the main attraction in 2000 because of their skills.

== Employment ==
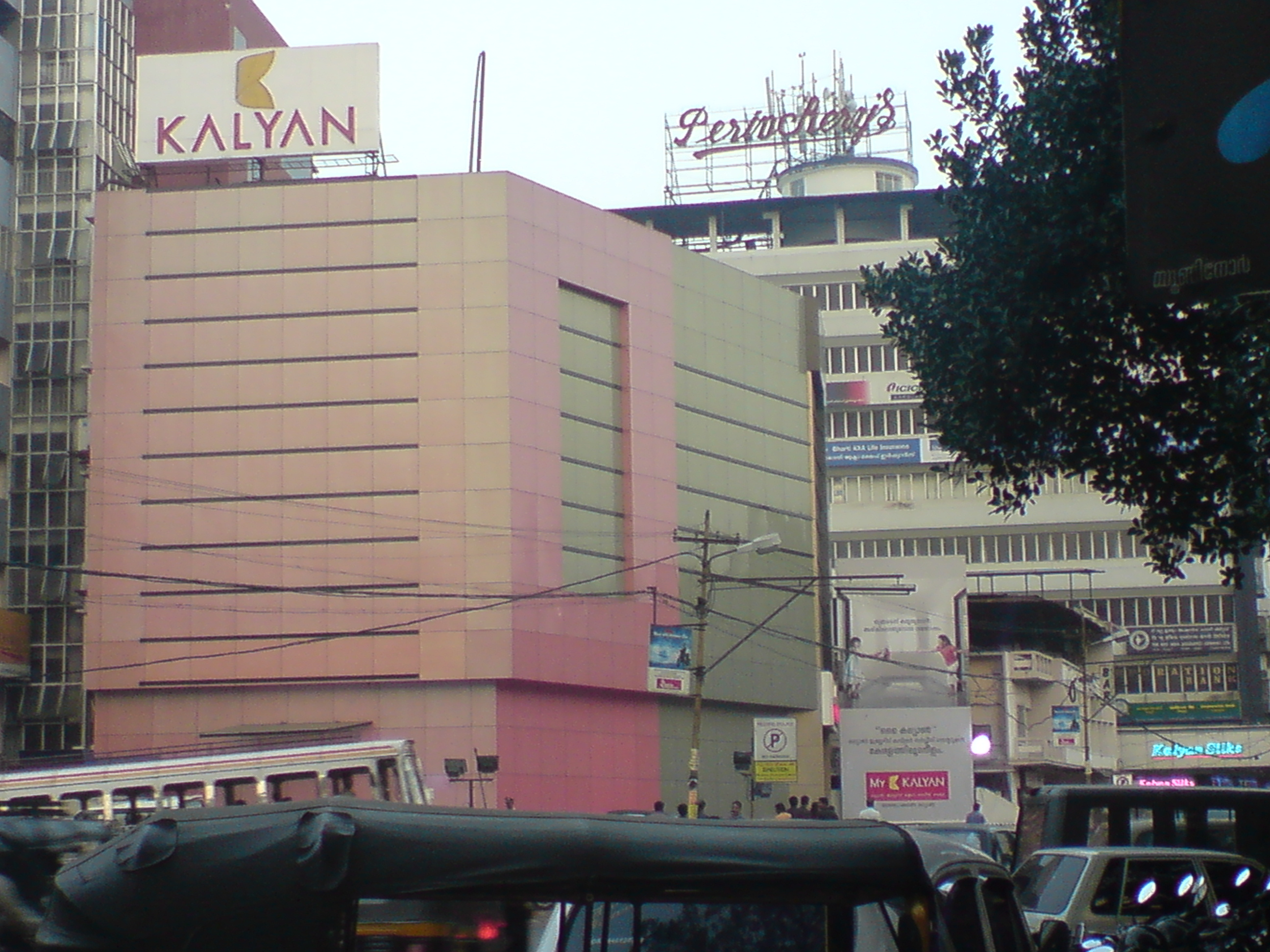
A showroom of Kalyan Jewellers in Thrissur city. The city is the hub of gold jewellery manufacturing in Kerala

There are around 3,000 gold ornaments manufacturing units in Thrissur city and 40,000-odd artisans and others work in these units. The industry provides direct and indirect employment to 200,000 people in Thrissur. The artisans based in these units, craft nearly 85 percent of one tonne gold which is used per day in Kerala. About 90 tonnes of gold was being used annually in Kerala for manufacturing of ornaments daily. According to Chief patron of the Jewellery Manufacturers' Association P V Jose there are over 6,000 jewellery shops in Kerala, most of which are in Thrissur. At least 20,000 workers from West Bengal and Orissa are employed in gold manufacturing units, according to him.

== Areas ==
Majority of the gold ornaments manufacturing units are artisan type located within a radius of 25 km mainly centered at Thrissur, Cherpu, Perinchery, Chevvur, Ammadam, Avinissery, Nallankara, Velur, Amballur, Vallachira, Kizhakkumpattukara and Ollur.

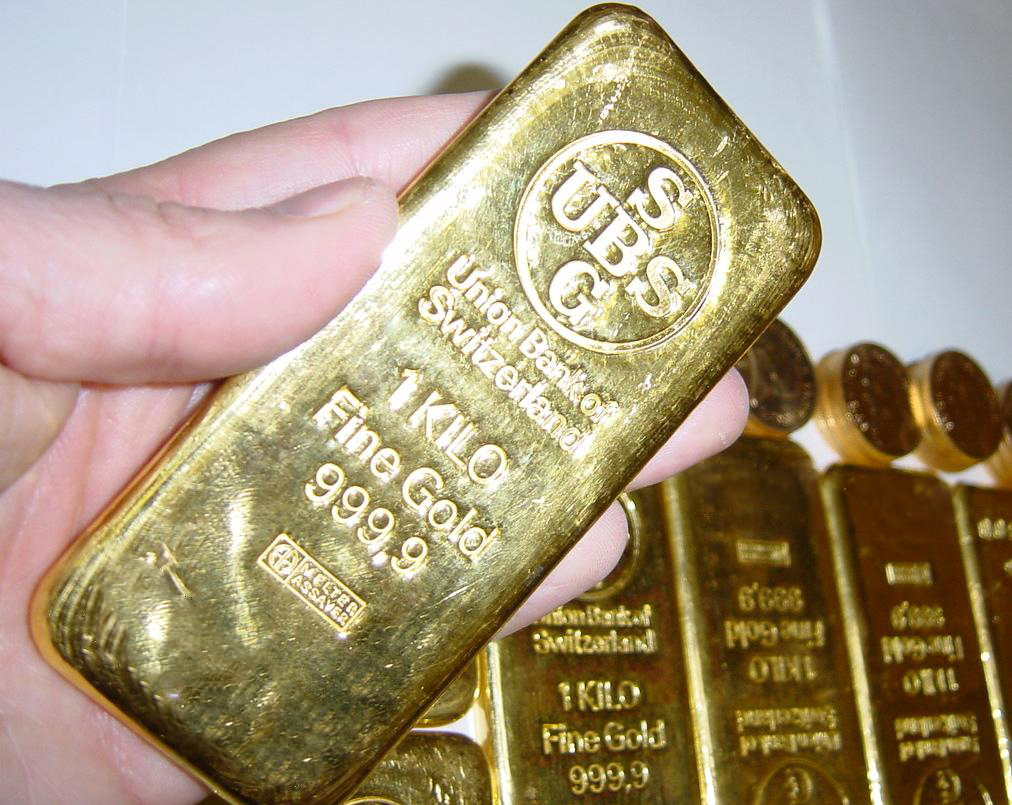
Swiss-cast 1 kg gold bar

- Gold jewellery manufacturing sector
  - Plain gold jewellery
  - Studded jewellery
  - Silver jewellery
  - Costume jewellery
  - Pearl jewellery
  - Diamond jewellery
- Imitation jewellery manufacturing sector
  - Copper based
  - Brass based
- Synthetic gem-cutting and polishing sector

== International Gemological Institute ==
The International Gemological Institute, the world's largest independent laboratory for testing and evaluating gemstones and fine jewellery, has started its first laboratory for South India region in Thrissur. It is also first satellite laboratory of IGI in India. The satellite laboratory has a staff of 15.

== Thrissur Gold Ornaments Cluster ==
Government of India under the cluster development programme of Ministry of Micro, Small and Medium Enterprises, prepared an action plan to build a cluster for gold ornaments in Thrissur in 2005. The consortium has 22 small scale industrial units as members engaged in the manufacture of good quality gold ornaments. It is situated at Nellankara, about 7 kilometres away from Thrissur. The consortia also started common marketing and procurement of raw materials. It also build a common platform in the name and style of Trichur Gold Manufacturers Society. The consortia organise common training programme for artisans and company owners, participation in jewellery shows and other programmes of common interest.
