= Vijay Kumar Dev =

Indian civil servant

Former Chief Secretary of Delhi
- In office 22 November 2018 – 20 April 2022
- Preceded by: Anshu Prakash
- Succeeded by: Naresh Kumar

Personal details
- Born: 8 March 1963 (age 63)
- Citizenship: India
- Occupation: Retd.IAS officer

Vijay Kumar Dev (born 8 March 1963) is a retired 1987 (AGMUT) (IAS) Indian Administrative Officer and former Chief Secretary of Delhi. He is serving as the State Election Commissioner of Delhi from 1 April 2022 till 7 March 2028.
