= Ammadam =

- village
- Location in Kerala, India Ammadam (India)
- Coordinates: 10°27′N 76°11′E
- Country: India
- State: Kerala
- District: Thrissur

Government
  - Body: Paralam Grama Panchayath

Languages
  - Official: Malayalam, English
- Time zone: UTC+5:30 (IST)
- PIN: 680563
- Telephone code: 0487
- Vehicle registration: KL-75
- Nearest city: Thrissur
- Climate: 23-32 (Köppen)

Ammadam (Ammayude Idam or Aa madom, literally meaning 'the place of mother') is a village in the Thrissur district of Kerala state in India, where traditional Ammadam is about 8 km (5 mi) away from the town of Thrissur. Until recently, the main occupation of the residents was farming or related to agriculture. The area is under the Parlam panchayat.

== Governance ==
Ammadam falls under The Paralam Panchayath, The Paralam panchayath is consolidation of 5 villages namely Ammadam, Kodannur, pallippuram, venginissery and Chenam.

Formerly Ammadam was under Cherpu constituency but now it is under Nattika.

== Demographics ==
According to the 1981 census of India, the village had 3,431 inhabitants, among whom 79.1% were literate and 20.4% belonged to a scheduled caste.
