= Centre for Development of Imaging Technology =

Government of Kerala undertaking

C-DIT
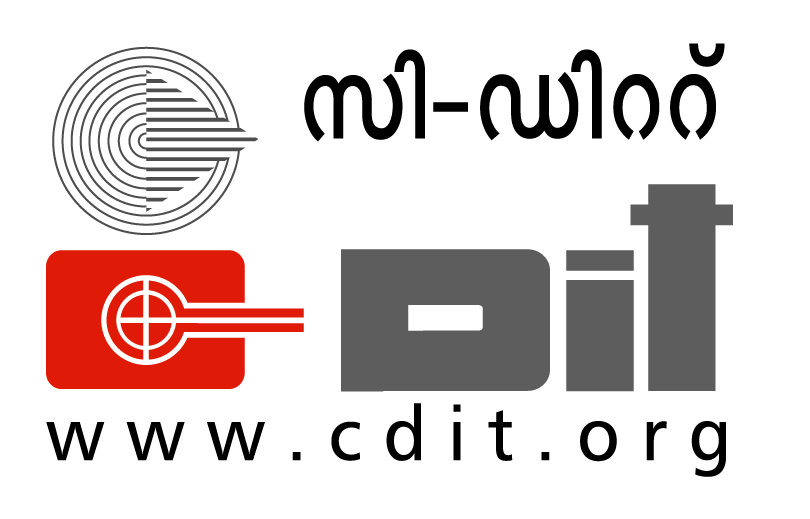
- Type: Autonomous Institution
- Industry: Software
- Founded: 1988; 38 years ago
- Founder: Government of Kerala
- Headquarters: Chithranjali Hills, Thiruvallam, Thiruvananthapuram, Kerala
- Key people: Dr. M. Abdul Rahiman (Director)
- Products: Hologram; Software; Imaging; Website
- Owner: Government of Kerala (Electronics and Information Technology Department)
- Website: cdit.org

The Centre for Development of Imaging Technology, abbreviated as C-DIT, was established by the Government of Kerala in 1988 for the advancement of research, development and training in imaging technology.

C-DIT has four groups, each specialising in a core area, viz. Communication Group, Technology Group, Education & Training Group and Operations Group. C-DIT functions as a provider to the departments and agencies under the government of Kerala in the areas of ICT applications and in supply of holography based security products.

== Location ==
C-DIT is situated near the campus of Chithranjali Hills, beside the Kerala State Film Development Corporation campus in Thiruvananthapuram, Kerala, India.

== Divisions ==
Information Systems Division

- Web Services Team
- Open Source Technology Team
- Software Engineering Team

Technology Division

- Optical Image Processing Team
- Technology Extension Team
- Communication Training Team

E-Governance and Research & Development Division

- E-Governance Team >>
- Research and Development Team
- Computational Linguistic Team

Visual Communication Division

- Advertisement Film Team
- Video Documentary Team
- Sutharykeralam and News Services
- Educational Informatics and New Media Team

Open Source Technology Team

- Unified web framework

Cybersri
