= 3i Infrastructure =

Investment business headquartered in Jersey

3i Infrastructure plc
- Type: Public
- Traded as: LSE: 3IN; FTSE 250 Component
- Industry: Investment
- Founded: 2007; 19 years ago
- Founder: 3i
- Headquarters: Jersey
- Key people: Richard Laing (chairman)
- Revenue: ▲£409 million (2026)
- Operating income: ▼£295 million (2026)
- Net income: ▼£295 million (2026)
- Website: www.3i-infrastructure.com

3i Infrastructure plc is an investment trust headquartered in Jersey. It is listed on the London Stock Exchange and is a constituent of the FTSE 250 Index.

== History ==
The company was launched by way of an initial public offering in 2007. Its early investments included Anglian Water Group and Oiltanking GmbH's terminal facilities in the Netherlands, Malta, and Singapore. Between 2010 and 2020, 3i Infrastructure invested in businesses such as Esvagt, Infinis and Wireless Infrastructure Group, a UK mobile infrastructure provider. Since 2021, the company’s new investments have included SRL Traffic Systems, a UK manufacturer and supplier of temporary traffic equipment, and Global Cloud Xchange.

About 29.2% of the company is owned by 3i Group plc.
