= Kodannur =

- village
- Location in Kerala, India Kodannur (India)
- Coordinates: 10.466309°N 76.184121°E
- Country: India
- State: Kerala
- District: Thrissur

Government
  - Body: Paralam Gram panchayat

Population (2011)
  - Total: 7,655

Languages
  - Official: Malayalam, English
- Time zone: UTC+5:30 (IST)
- PIN: 680563
- Vehicle registration: KL-75

Kodannur is a village in Thrissur district in the state of Kerala, India. It is almost 10 km from Thrissur city. This village include main three parts: 1. Chakkyarkadavu; 2. Thannikkyamunayam; 3. Sasthamkadavu. The Village is surrounded with paddy fields.

== Demographics ==
According to the 2011 India census, Kodannur had a population of 7655 with 3707 males and 3948 females.
