= Information and Communication Technology Academy of Kerala =

Indian non-profit organization

ICT Academy of Kerala
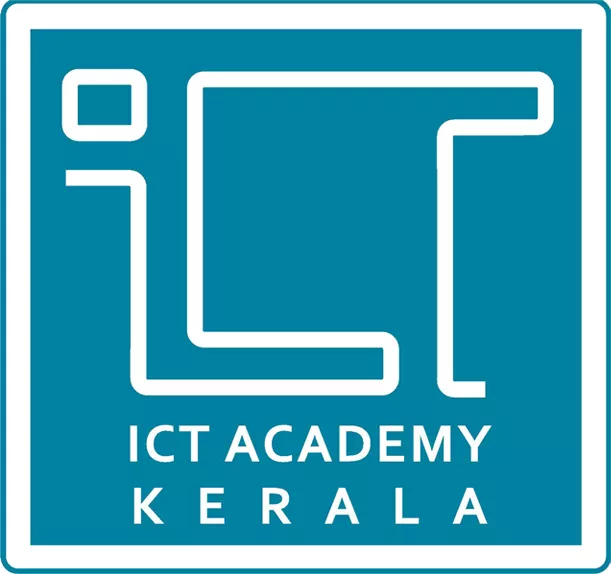
- Type: Non-Profit Organization
- Founded: 2008
- Headquarters: Kerala, India
- Area served: Thiruvananthapuram; Thrissur; Kozhikode
- Key people: Tony Thomas (Chairman); Muraleedharan Manningal (CEO)
- Website: https://ictkerala.org

Information and Communication Technology Academy of Kerala is an organisation established by Government of Kerala to enhance the quality of graduates in the information technology sector and to generate resources for increasing the employability of students. The project of setting up the Academy was initiated by Ministry of Information and Communications Technology, Government of India. Even though the proposal for setting up such an Academy was given formal approval in 2008, due to indecisiveness in choosing the implementing agency, the project continued to remain on paper. In December 2013, Government of Kerala appointed S.D. Shibulal, chief executive officer and managing director of Infosys, as the Chairman of the Board of Governors of the Academy. The Board of Director of ICT Academy of Kerala appoint Mr.Muraleedharan Manningal as the Chief Executive Officer. He joined on 20 October 2023 succeeded by Mr. Santhosh Kurup. The Registered office of ICT Academy of Kerala is at Thejaswini Building, Technopark Campus, Karyavattom, Trivandrum.

== Inauguration ==
ICT Academy was officially inaugurated by Chief Minister of Kerala Mr. Oommen Chandy on 24 June 2014 at a function held in Thiruvananthapuram in the presence of Education Minister P.K. Abdu Rabb, Additional Chief Secretary V. Somasundaram, and Higher Education Principal Secretary K.M. Abraham.

The Chief Minister also released the logo of the ICT Academy and Education Minister P.K. Abdu Rabb launched the academy’s website and learning management system called ‘Paatshala’.

== Training Programs ==
Effective Course Delivery in Physical, Online, and Hybrid modes The major programs are:

- Agentic AI
- Generative AI
- AI/ML
- Data Science
- Full Stack Development - MEAN/MERN Stacks
- Cyber Security
- Testing, Test Automation, SDET
- Cloud Computing - Azure, AWS, GCP
- DevOps
- LifeSKill Programs
- Leadership Development
- Faculty Development Programs
- Smart Governance to Govt Officials
