= GCX Managed Services =

Indian telecommunications company

- Type: Private
- Industry: Cloud Connectivity; Managed SD-Wan; Hybrid Networks
- Founded: 14 March 2014; 12 years ago
- Area served: Worldwide
- Products: SD-WAN SASE
- Owner: 3i Infrastructure (2022–present)
- Website: www.gcxworld.com

GCX Managed Services (GCX) is a company which provides network services for enterprises, new media providers and telecoms carriers. In September 2022, it was acquired by 3i Infrastructure for $512 million. In April 2025 the previously branded Global Cloud Xchange was rebranded into FLAG and GCX Managed Services (GCX) in 2025.

== Overview ==
GCX has principal offices in London, and Mumbai, and additional offices in Australia, France, Germany, Italy, the Netherlands, Singapore, Taiwan, the and the United States.

== History ==
Global Cloud Xchange was formed as part of the rebranding of certain businesses of RGBV, which includes FLAG Telecom Group Limited ("FLAG"), Reliance Vanco Group Limited ("Vanco") and Yipes Holdings, Inc. ("Yipes").

In 2003, the Reliance Group was acquired. In 2008, renamed FLAG as Reliance Globalcom Limited ("RGL"). RGL owns and operates various undersea and terrestrial fiber assets around the world, including the FEA cable system linking Europe to Asia via the Middle East and India. Before being acquired by Reliance Group, FLAG was listed on the NASDAQ National Market and London Stock Exchange. FLAG was first established in 1993 by a group of telecommunications companies led by Bell Atlantic.

In 2007, RGL acquired Yipes through one of RGL's wholly owned subsidiaries. Yipes is a US-based Ethernet Service provider which provides Ethernet and application delivery services for global enterprises. Established in 1999, Yipes has pioneered the Ethernet technology in metropolitan area networks.

In 2008, RGL acquired Vanco through one of its wholly owned subsidiaries. Vanco is a global Wide Area Network Operator. Vanco provides enterprise clients, directly or through partners, with optimized fully managed network solutions. Vanco was established in 1988 and its original parent company, Vanco plc, was listed on the London Stock Exchange before it was acquired by RGL.

In 2011, Reliance Globalcom set up world's first global Mediterranean gateway and hub in Europe set up with Hawk cable system.

In March 2014, RGL rebranded as Global Cloud Xchange (GCX) under the leadership of CEO, Bill Barney, to align with the company's strategic plan to deliver an integrated portfolio of infrastructure, data center and managed network services with cloud capabilities, especially across key emerging markets in Asia and the Middle East.

In March and June 2014, GCX announced plans for new subsea cables between Tokyo and California and between Mumbai and Singapore respectively, to bridge important gap and meet soaring bandwidth demands of new cloud-based applications and services.

In July 2014, GCX announced successful debut in the Global Capital Market by raising US$350M fixed rate notes maturing in 2019. The deal received an overwhelming response from the market, and was significantly oversubscribed.

In October and December 2014, GCX launched transformational Cloud X platform in Hong Kong and London. This new high performance enterprise-class platform delivers applications and content across the company's privately owned global fiber optic network.

In 2015, GCX launched Cloud X Fusion, providing low latency connectivity across developed and emerging markets in the US, Europe, Middle East and Asia, which gives enterprises security, reliability and predictability.

In July 2015, Reliance Communications (RCOM) expanded its next generation content and cloud delivery network – part of its subsidiary Global Cloud Xchange – to five additional cities in Delhi, Mumbai, Chennai, Bangalore and Hyderabad as part of a wider strategy to support future growth in the country. These Cloud Xchange nodes can help government departments access 240 times the amount of compute power currently available in government data centers, and over six times the high speed storage currently available in India.

In February 2016, Global Cloud Xchange (GCX) announced the launch of Cloud X in Sydney, enabling customers across Australia to have on-net access to public Cloud platforms such as AWS, Microsoft Azure, Softlayer, Google, Rackspace, VMWare and more than 20 others worldwide, as well as software services like Microsoft Office 365 and Google Apps for Work.

In May 2016, Global Cloud Xchange was named Best Managed Services Provider at the Telecom Asia Awards held in conjunction with the annual Telco Strategies in Kuala Lumpur, Malaysia.

In April 2017, Global Cloud Xchange partnered with Alibaba group's Alibaba Cloud Express to drive new business opportunities in enterprise segment.

In June 2017, Global Cloud Xchange partnered with Aegis Data, vScaler. GCX enables direct access to vScaler's Cloud Services platform via GCX's CLOUD X Fusion, delivering Next Generation application-specific Cloud Services to consumers and enterprises over the GCX Global Network.

In June 2017, Global Cloud Xchange won two Datacloud Awards. "Excellence in Connectivity for Data Centers" and "Excellence in Cloud Services" at the Datacloud Europe 2017 conference.

Also in June 2017, Global Cloud Xchange partnered with Sovereign to offer global connectivity to business enterprise customers.

In September 2019, the company filed for bankruptcy protection in a US court when it failed to pay $350 million of 7% bonds that matured in the beginning of August, 2019.

In February 2020, Global Cloud Xchange renewed multi-year contract with Autoneum, to enhance Autoneum's Internet infrastructure with enhanced connectivity to 55 production locations across 25 countries in Europe, North and South America, Africa, and Asia.

Global Cloud Xchange Announces Majority Emergence from Bankruptcy

In May 2021, GCX announced key findings from a Pioneer Consulting report evaluating the service life of its global subsea asset. The evaluation concluded at least five more years on GCX's oldest operating systems, plus longer life at increased capacity available for the foreseeable future.

In July 2021, GCX reported Free Cash Flow of $24.9 million, representing an $82.7 million improvement year-on-year, enabling the business to paydown nearly $10.5 million in debt. The combination of strong cash flow and deleveraging the business allows GCX to continue reinvesting toward future growth.

In April 2025, GCX was rebranded into GCX Managed Services and FLAG Networks and the Global Cloud Xchange name was retired.

== Global Network ==
GCX's managed network services platform connects approximately 27,000 sites in 158 countries through a combination of leased and owned infrastructure offered through a dedicated secure IP network. With a NOC in Mumbai, the functions of which include 24-hour monitoring, network operations, restoration coordination and technical support.

== Leadership ==
Senior Leadership

- Lorenzo Romano: Chief Executive Officer
- Michael Hartmann: Chief Revenue Officer
- Jonathan Wright: Chief Product and Marketing Officer
- Tom Gavin: Chief Technology Officer
- Brice Evin: Chief Financial Officer
