= UST (company) =

American technology company

- Formerly: UST Global (2007-2021); US Technology Resources (1998-2007)
- Type: Private
- Industry: Professional services; Information technology; Digital engineering; Product development
- Founded: 1998; 28 years ago
- Founder: Stephen Ross
- Headquarters: Orange County, California, United States & Thiruvananthapuram India
- Number of locations: 30 countries
- Area served: Worldwide
- Key people: Paras Chandaria (Executive Chairman); Krishna Sudheendra (CEO); Arun Narayanan (President)
- Services: Digital transformation; Technology and digital consulting; NextGen cloud infrastructure (private, public, hybrid cloud); Human-centered design; Cybersecurity
- Revenue: US$1.7B+ (2022)
- Number of employees: 30,000+
- Subsidiaries: CyberProof; UST HealthProof; UST Product Engineering; Cogniphi Technologies; Xpanxion
- Website: ust.com

UST, formerly known as UST Global & US Technology Resources, is an American provider of digital technology and transformation, information technology and services, headquartered in Aliso Viejo, California, United States. It has offices in the Americas, EMEA, APAC, and India.

== History ==
UST was founded by Stephen J. Ross in 1998 in Laguna Hills. G.A. Menon joined in 1999 as Non-Executive Chairman.

In January 2004, UST acquired eBuilt Inc.

In March 2012, Andare, a mobile applications company, was acquired by UST.

In January 2014, UST acquired Testhouse Consultores S.A., the Spanish arm of UK-based Testhouse Limited. In May 2014, UST acquired Kanchi Technologies, a Milwaukee-based engineering company, and Xpanxion, a technology firm. Xpanxion provides cloud-based business application development, mobile application development, software testing services, and technology and business consulting. In July 2014, UST invested in xTV, an online TV platform, and acquired Renaissance Solutions, a Singapore-based recruitment specialist.

In April 2015, UST acquired FogPanel to boost cloud infrastructure management.

In September 2017, UST invested in MyDoc, a Singapore-based digital healthcare firm, to drive population-wide digital health programs, including disease management and health data tracking.

In January 2018, Cyberproof, a cybersecurity company of UST, acquired Bisec, an Israeli startup that created a platform to help security teams collaborate. The following month, UST acquired American technology startup and Gartner Cool Vendor, Pneuron in an effort to improve its data analytics services. In June 2018, Temasek, Singapore’s sovereign wealth fund, invested US$250 million in UST, giving UST a US$1 billion-plus valuation. In September 2018, UST acquired SeviTech Systems, a chip design services firm based in Bengaluru.

In October 2019, UST acquired SCM Accelerators to help grow its SAP business. In November 2019, UST acquired Contineo Health, a healthcare technology consulting firm that specializes in electronic health records (EHR), ComplyUSA, a compliance assessment and privacy automation platform, and AI startup, Cogniphi Technologies.

In June 2020, UST invested €1.3 million in Ksubaka, a UK-based startup. The portfolio includes gamified tools to engage and keep customers safe post-covid. The following month, UST invested in Smart Software Testing Solutions, a software testing and product company, that utilizes SaaS platforms pCloudy and OpKey. In August 2020, UST invested in Tastry, an AI company that studies how human senses interpret product chemistry.

In July 2022, UST invested in Well-Beat, an Israeli company focused on patient-centred behavioural artificial intelligence (AI). In October 2022, UST HealthProof, a UST company, acquired Advantasure.

In August 2023, UTS acquired MobileComm, a major telecommunication company in US.

== Campuses ==
UST is based in Orange County, California, and has offices in more than 25 countries. It is based in the following regions: the Americas, EMEA, APAC, and India.

UST has started its expansion plans in India in the capital city of Kerala, Thiruvananthapuram, with the construction of its own campus, near Technopark. The campus is spread over 36 acres (150,000 m^{2}). The campus will also feature a 12-acre (49,000 m^{2}) waterbody channeling through the various blocks of the campus.

== Subsidiaries ==
=== CyberProof ===
CyberProof is a fully owned subsidiary of UST and founded in 2017 in Tel Aviv, Israel.

In January 2018, UST acquired BISEC, a cybersecurity company, for 5.8 million Dollars and integrated the technology into CyberProof.
