= Esvagt =

Danish shipping company

- Industry: Offshore
- Founded: 1981
- Headquarters: Esbjerg, Denmark,
- Key people: Kristian Ole Jakobsen & Søren Karas (CEO)
- Revenue: 1,081M DKK (2021)
- Number of employees: 1000+
- Parent: 3i Infrastructure
- Website: esvagt.com

Esvagt is Danish offshore shipping company providing safety and support at sea.

== History ==
Esvagt was founded in 1981. It supports the offshore wind and oil and gas industries with a wide range of specialised services: standby, emergency response and rescue vessels (ERRV), oil spill response, firefighting, tanker assistance, rig moves, supply services and inter-field transfer of cargo and personnel.

3i Infrastructure and AMP Capital acquired Esvagt from the Maersk Group and ESE Holding in 2015. It is now wholly owned by 3i Infrastructure.

== Vessels ==
Esvagt owns and operates a fleet of more than 40 vessels, including nine Service Operation Vessels (SOV). They developed SOVs in 2010 to provide accommodation and working spaces in support of the offshore wind industry.

=== Service Operation Vessels (SOV) ===
Esvagt SOVs
name	year	builder	design
Esvagt Alba	2021	New Havyard Shipyard, Norway	Havyard 831L SOV
Esvagt Albert Betz	2019-21	New Havyard Shipyard, Norway	Havyard 831L SOV
Esvagt Dana	2018	Zamakona Shipyard, Spain	Havyard 931 CCV
Esvagt Faraday	2015	Havyard Ship Technology, Norway	Havyard 832 SOV Design
Esvagt Froude	2015	Havyard Ship Technology, Norway	Havyard 832 SOV Design
Esvagt Havelok	2021	New Havyard Shipyard, Norway	Havyard 831L SOV Design
Esvagt Mercator	2017	Cemre Shipyard, Turkey	Havyard 831 SOV Design
Esvagt Njord	2016	Havyard Ship Technology, Norway	Havyard 832 SOV Design
Esvagt Schelde	2020	New Havyard Shipyard, Norway	Havyard 831L SOV Design

=== Multi-role ERRV ===
Esvagt ERRVs
name	year	builder	design
Esvagt Aurora	2012	Zamakona Shipyard, Spain	Ulstein SX123
Esvagt Bergen	2011		
Esvagt Connector	2000	Odense Steel Shipyard	
Esvagt Dee	2000	Odense Steel Shipyard	
Esvagt Don	2000	Odense Steel Shipyard	
Esvagt Heidi	2012	Ulstein Shipyard, Norway	Ulstein PX 121
Esvagt Innovator	2018	Cemre Shipyard	Havyard 832 MPV
Esvagt Leah	2012	Ulstein Shipyard, Norway	Ulstein PX 121
Esvagt Observer	1999	Odense Steel Shipyard	
Esvagt Server	2012	Singapore	
Esvagt Stavanger	2012	Armon Shipyard, Spain	Ulstein SX123

=== Standby ERRV ===
mostly 45.80 m length

Esvagt ERRVs
name	year	builder
Esvagt Cantana	2015	ASL, Singapore
Esvagt Capella	2004	
Esvagt Capri	2010	
Esvagt Carina	2007	ASL, Singapore
Esvagt Caroline	2008	ASL, Singapore
Esvagt Carpathia	2007	ASL, Singapore
Esvagt Cassiopeia	2008	ASL, Singapore
Esvagt Castor	2009	ASL, Singapore
Esvagt Celeste	2013	ASL, Singapore
Esvagt Celina	2013	ASL, Singapore
Esvagt Champion	2007	ASL, Singapore
Esvagt Charlie	1976 / 1991	
Esvagt Chastine	2015	ASL, Singapore
Esvagt Christina	2010	ASL, Singapore
Esvagt Claudine	2014	ASL, Singapore
Esvagt Cobra	2009	ASL, Singapore
Esvagt Contender	2008	ASL, Singapore
Esvagt Cornelia	2014	ASL, Singapore
Esvagt Corona	2004	
Esvagt Kappa	2002	
Esvagt Preserver	1966 / 2016	
Esvagt Sigma	2002	

=== Crew Change Vessel ===
Esvagt Beta 1991 / 2008 76.60 m
