= P. K. Kunhalikutty =

Indian politician (born 1951)

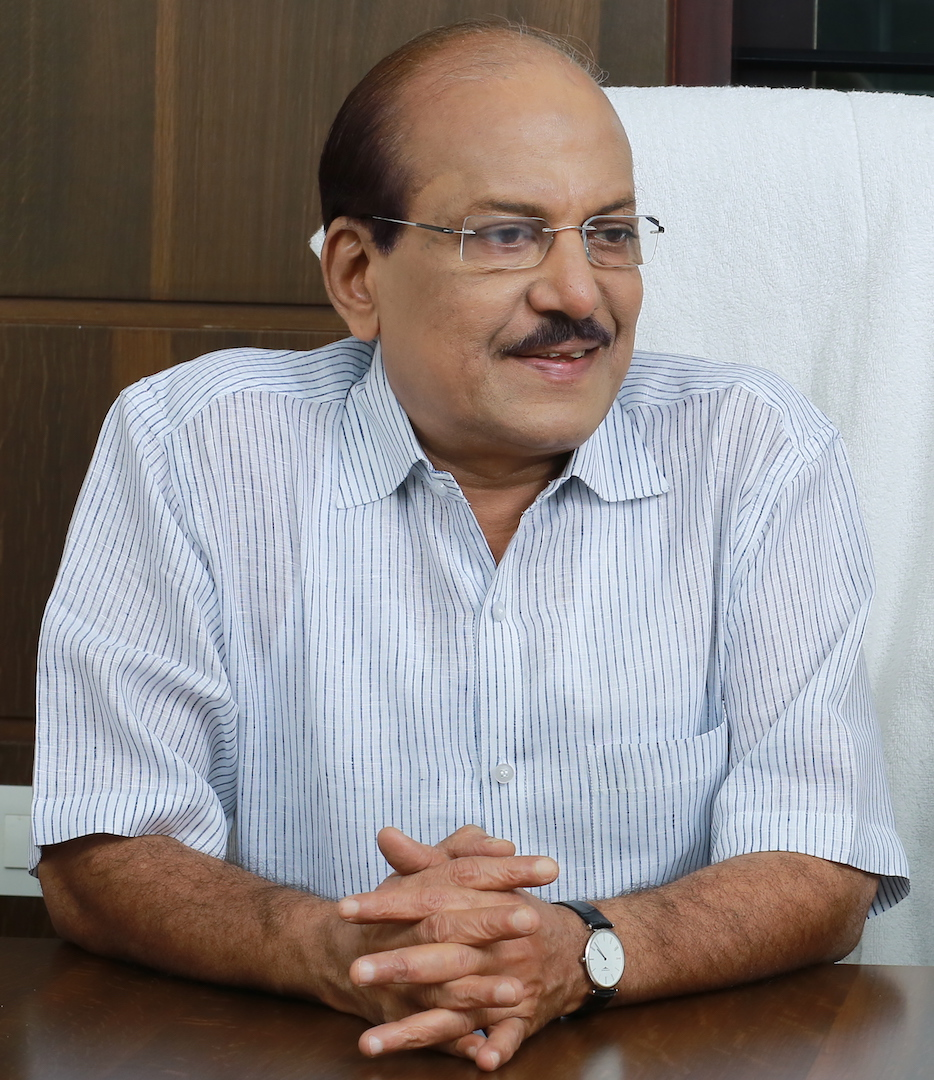
- Kunhalikutty in 2016

Minister for Industries and Information Technology, Government of Kerala
- Incumbent
- Assumed office 18 May 2026
- Governor: Rajendra Arlekar
- Chief Minister: V. D. Satheesan
- Portfolio(s): See list: Industries & Commerce; Electronics & Information Technology; Artificial Intelligence; Start ups; Mining & Geology; Handlooms and Textiles
- Preceded by: P. Rajeeve (Industries); Pinarayi Vijayan (Electronics & IT)
- In office 23 May 2011 – 19 May 2016
- Governor: R. S. Gavai; M. O. H. Farook; H. R. Bhardwaj; Nikhil Kumar
- Chief Minister: Oommen Chandy
- Portfolio(s): Industries; IT; Trade & Commerce; Mining & Geology; Wakf & Haj Affairs
- Preceded by: Elamaram Kareem
- Succeeded by: E. P. Jayarajan (Industries) Pinarayi Vijayan (Electronics & IT)
- In office 17 May 2001 – 04 January 2005
- Governor: R. L. Bhatia
- Chief Minister: A. K. Antony(2001-04), Oommen Chandy (2004-06)
- Ministry and Departments: Industries; IT; Social Welfare
- Preceded by: Susheela Gopalan
- Succeeded by: V. K. Ebrahimkunju
- In office 22 March 1991 – 9 May 1996
- Governor: B. Rachaiah; P. Shiv Shankar; Khurshed Alam Khan
- Chief Minister: A. K. Antony
- Ministry and Departments: Industries; Municipalities
- Preceded by: K. R. Gouri Amma
- Succeeded by: Susheela Gopalan

Member of the Kerala Legislative Assembly
- Incumbent
- Assumed office 4 May 2026
- Preceded by: P. Ubaidulla
- Constituency: Malappuram
- In office 2 May 2021 – 4 May 2026
- Preceded by: K. N. A. Khader
- Succeeded by: K. M. Shaji
- Constituency: Vengara
- In office 13 May 2011 – 17 July 2017
- Succeeded by: K. N. A. Khader
- Constituency: Vengara
- In office 19 June 1991 – 11 May 2006
- Succeeded by: K. T. Jaleel
- Constituency: Kuttippuram

Deputy Opposition Leader in Kerala Legislative Assembly
- In office 22 May 2021 – 23 May 2026
- Leader: V. D. Satheesan

Member of Parliament, Lok Sabha
- In office 17 July 2017 – 3 February 2021
- Preceded by: E. Ahamed
- Succeeded by: M. P. Abdussamad Samadani
- Constituency: Malappuram

Personal details
- Born: 1 June 1951 (age 75) Oorakam, Madras State, India (present-day Malappuram district, Kerala, India)
- Party: Indian Union Muslim League
- Children: 2

Pandikkadavath Kunhalikutty is an Indian politician, social worker, agriculturalist, entrepreneur and businessman who serves as the Minister for Industries & Information Technology in the Government of Kerala. He is a Member of Legislative Assembly from Malappuram Assembly Constituency. He also serves as National General Secretary of Indian Union Muslim League (IUML).

Kunhalikutty was born at Oorakam in Malabar district, Madras State in 1951. He entered public life through students and college union politics and served as Chairman of Malappuram Municipality at the age of 29 in 1980. He was elected to the Kerala state Legislative Assembly for the first time from the Malappuram Constituency in 1982. He went on to become Member of Legislative Assembly of Kerala eight times between 1982 and 2021. He also served as Minister for Industries in several Kerala Legislative Assemblies (under Congress leaders K. Karunakaran, A. K. Antony and Oommen Chandy). Kunhalikutty served as Kerala State General Secretary of Indian Union Muslim League from 2003 - 2006 and from 2007 - 2011.

Kunhalikutty is popularly known as "Kunjappa" among his supporters. He is known for his deep 'bonding' to United Democratic Front, the decades-old Congress-led pre-poll alliance in Kerala. As per Malayala Manorama daily, "the persuasive charm" of Kunhalikutty is widely respected by his political peers and rivals. He is also known for his 'vast experience in crafting strategic moves', and having 'weathered many a storm in his political career'. The Outlook magazine once described Kunhalikutty as "Indian Union Muslim League's backbone in Kerala politics."

== Background and career ==
P. K. Kunhalikutty was born on 1 June 1951 at Oorakam, Melmuri in present-day Malappuram District as the son of Pandikkadavath Mohamed Haji and K. P. Fathima Kutty. He completed his secondary education from G. V. H. S. S. Vengara. He has an under-graduate degree in commerce from Sir Syed College, Taliparamba. He was also educated at Farook College, Kozhikode. He is also a Post-Graduate Diploma holder in Business Management.

=== Personal life ===
Kunhalikutty is married to K. M. Ummul Kulza and the couple have two children. He spends his spare time in vegetable cultivation at a plot near his residence and in ornamental fish farming.

The chairman of Koyenco Group, P. P. Koya, is brother-in-law of P. K. Kunhalikutty.

== Political career ==
Kunhalikutty is also the National General Secretary of Indian Union Muslim League, (IUML). He earlier served as Kerala State General Secretary, Indian Union Muslim League from 2003 - 2006 and 2007 - 2011. He was National Treasurer, Indian Union Muslim League.

He is also serving presently as Director, Chandrika daily and Director, Muhammed Koya International Foundation. From May 2016 to April 2017, he served as Deputy Leader of Opposition, Kerala Legislative Assembly.

=== 1980 Malappuram Municipality chairman ===
Kunhalikutty entered politics through Muslim Students Federation (the MSF), the student wing of Indian Union Muslim League. He later became State Treasurer, Muslim Students Federation. He also served as Secretary, Farook College Students Union. He completed graduation at Sir Syed College, Taliparamba.

He subsequently served as chairman, Malappuram Municipality, at the age of 29, in 1980. The Indian Express later wrote, "he became the blue-eyed boy of the [respected] Panakkad Thangal family after displaying political acumen and charisma upon being elected Malappuram Municipality chairman in 1980". Rise of Kunhalikutty in Indian Union Muslim League after the 1980 victory was later described by the media as "meteoric".

=== Tenures in Kerala Legislative Assembly ===
Kunhalikutty has been elected to Kerala Legislative Assembly eight times, in 1982 and 1987, contesting from Malappuram Assembly Constituency, and in 1991, 1996 and 2001, from Kuttippuram Constituency and in 2011, 2016 and 2021 from Vengara Constituency. In the 2006 Left Democratic Front wave in Kerala, Kunhalikutty was defeated by K.T. Jaleel in Kuttippuram Constituency.

=== Career as Minister for Industries ===
Kunhalikutty served as Minister for Industries and Social Welfare from 1991 to 1995 in the K. Karunakaran Ministry (1991–95). As per observers, the selection was an indication of senior leader K. Karunakaran's regard for the "young League politician".

Kunhalikutty went on to serve as Minister for Industries and Municipalities from 1995 to 1996, and Minister for Industries, IT and Social Welfare from 2001 to 2004, in two A. K. Antony Ministries and Minister for Industries, IT and Social Welfare, from 2004 to 2005 in the Oommen Chandy Ministry. In 2011 he was the wealthiest member in the cabinet of Oommen Chandy and served as Minister for the remarkable IT Project Akshaya project in 2002.

U D F term	Chief Minister	Period	Portfolios
1991–1996	K. Karunakaran	1991–95	Industries and Social Welfare
1991–1996	A. K. Antony	1995–96	Industries and Municipalities
2001–2006	A. K. Antony	2001–04	Industries, Information Technology and Social Welfare
2001–2006	Oommen Chandy	2004–05	Industries, Information Technology and Social Welfare
2011–2016	Oommen Chandy	2011–16	Industries, Information Technology, Haj and Wakf and Mining and Geology
2026-2031	V. D. Satheesan	2026- Continues	Industries & Commerce, Information Technology, Artificial Intelligence, Start ups, Mining and Geology, Handlooms & Textiles

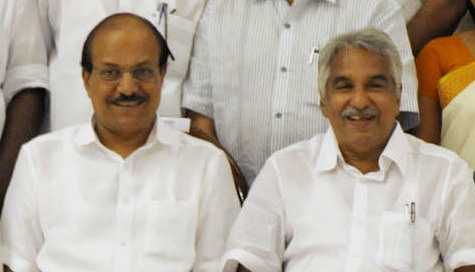
P. K. Kunhalikutty with Oommen Chandy (2012)

=== Member of Parliament ===
Kunhalikutty got elected as Member of Parliament from Malappuram Parliamentary Constituency in 2017 in a by-election. The election was a result of the death of former Minister of State for External Affairs and senior IUML leader E. Ahamed. Kunhalikutty won from all the seven Assembly constituencies of the Parliament Constituency. He was re-elected to Malappuram during the 2019 general elections.

He was a member of Standing Committee on Railways, Government of India. From May 2017 to January 2018, he was a member in Committee on Government Assurances, Government of India.

=== Return to Legislative Assembly ===
In February 2021, Kunhalikutty resigned from the Lok Sabha to contest the 2021 Kerala Legislative Assembly election. He is currently a Member of Legislative Assembly from Vengara Assembly Constituency.

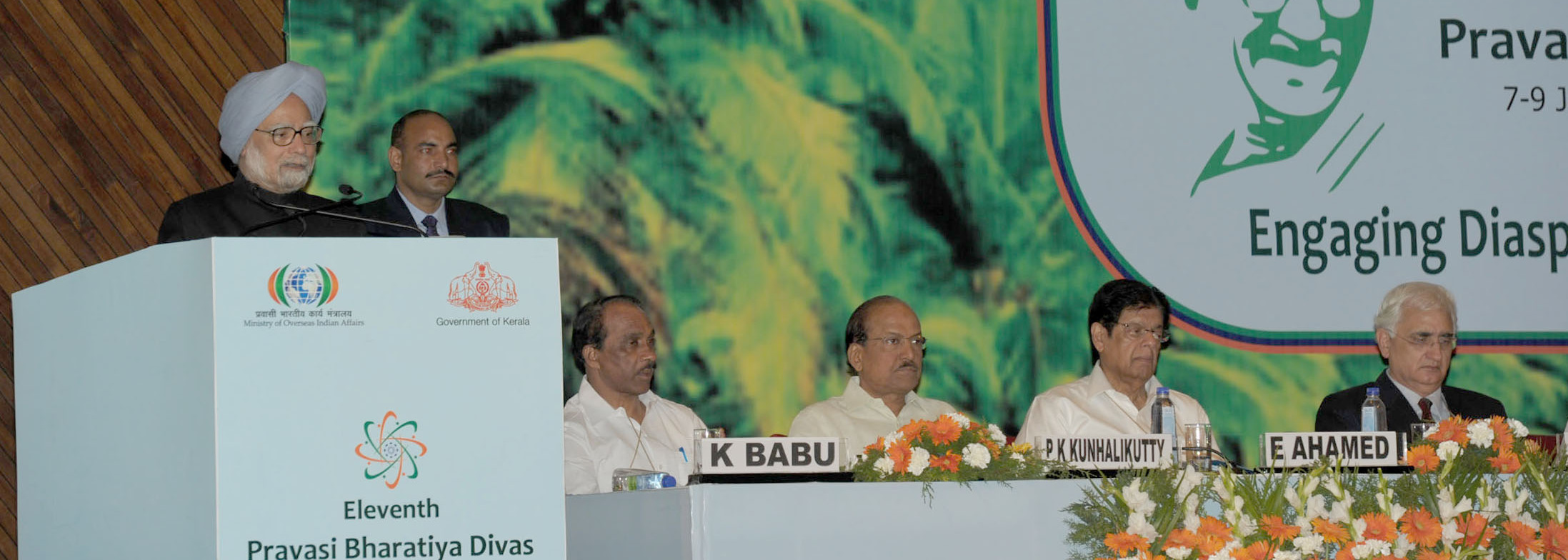
P. K. Kunhalikutty (third from right) with the then Prime Minister Dr. Manmohan Singh at the 11th Pravasi Bharatiya Divas (2013) in Kochi

== Controversies ==
P. K. Kunhalikutty experienced electoral defeat only in 2006 Kerala state assembly elections due to his involvement in the 1997 Ice cream parlour sex scandal. A closure report in the case was filed in the trial court later by the Special Investigation Team. There were severe allegations levelled in relation to this case including death of two girls in Kozhikode. The Supreme Court of India had in 2016 dismissed a petition from the opposition communists seeking a federal probe into the case.

There were allegations in relation to 2020 Kerala gold smuggling case that one of the key accused, K.T. Ramees is a relative of P.K. Kunhalikutty.

In 2018, he skipped a Lok Sabha session for attending a marriage in Dubai when parliamentary proceedings over Muslim Women (Protection of Rights on Marriage) Act, 2018 were taking place. He was heavily criticised for his behaviour as the bill was about the criminalisation of triple talaq in India.

In 2011, there was plea before Vigilance and Anti Corruption Bureau Court, Thrissur made by Andul Aziz from National Secular Conference to undertake a probe into wealth amassed by P.K. Kunhalikutty and his relatives. The plea had mention about investments made into Seashore Rolling Engineering Company owned by son of P.K. Kunhalikutty. The plea was dismissed by the VACB court due to inadequate evidences to support the claim.

== See also ==
- Indian Union Muslim League

Lok Sabha
Preceded by E. Ahamed	Member of Parliament for Malappuram; 17 April 2017 – 2021	Succeeded by M. P. Abdussamad Samadani
