= Akshaya project =

Computer literacy project in Kerala, India

- Mission statement: Reforming Kerala through digitization
- Type of project: Micro-enterprise
- Products: Computer Literacy
- Location: Kerala
- Owner: Kerala State IT Mission
- Founder: Government of Kerala
- Country: India
- Chief Minister: Pinarayi Vijayan
- Established: 18 November 2002; 22 years ago
- Funding: Government of Kerala
- Status: Active
- Website: www.akshaya.kerala.gov.in

The Akshaya project first started in the rural areas of Malappuram district of Kerala, India, and has now spread all around the state. The project was the first district-wide computer literacy project in India and one of the largest known Internet Protocol (IP) based wireless networks in the world. In November 2002, the state government of Kerala put into place a project, piloted in Malappuram, with the goal of at least one person in every family to be computer literate in that district. Malappuram is now what is said to be India's first E-literate District. The mission continues to make Kerala the first E-literate state in India.

== History ==
The project started in 2002 in Ariyallur, Malappuram district under the Kerala State IT Mission. The project came into being as a result of the efforts of the leaders P. K. Kunhalikutty (former State Industries and IT Minister ) and key role Abdurahiman Randathani With the encouragement of the then Kerala Chief Minister, A. K. Antony then Kerala Industries and IT Minister constituted a twenty committee of experts to make a e-literacy on establishing e-literacy project in the State.

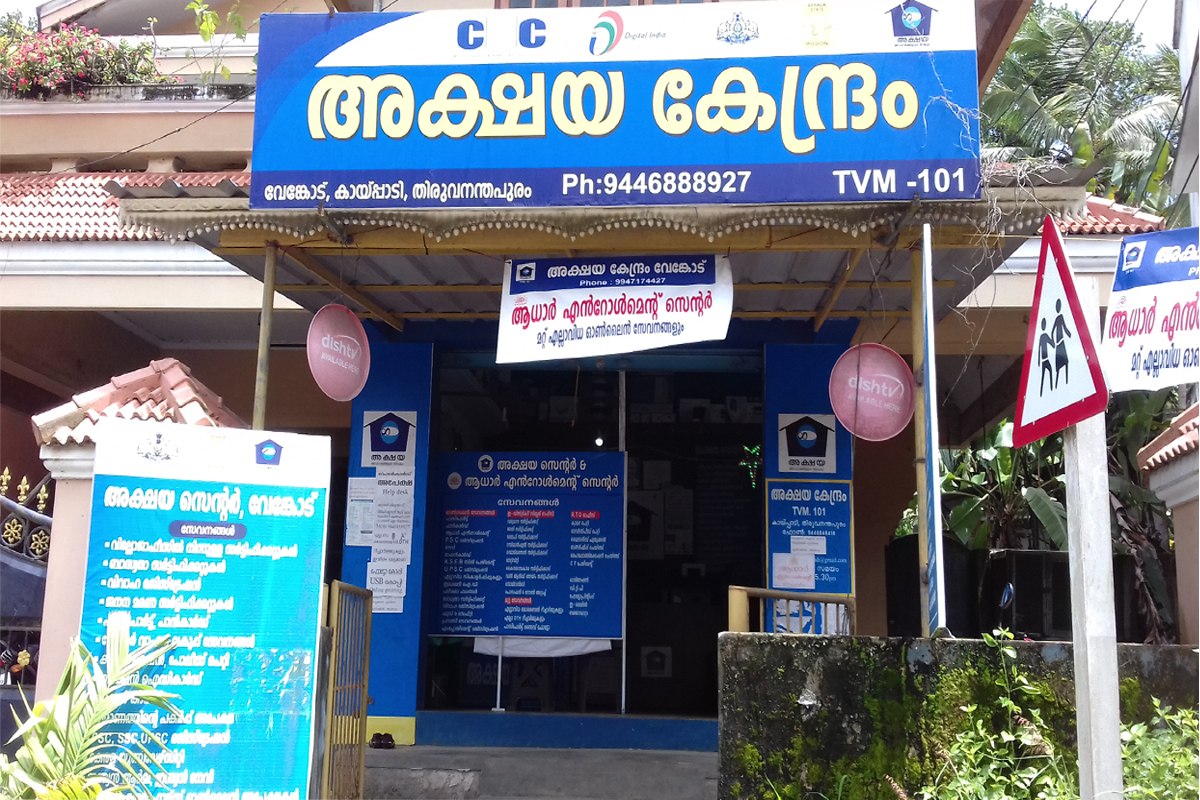
AKSHAYA Kendram In Vencode
