= Kerala University of Digital Sciences, Innovation and Technology =

State university in Kerala, India

Coordinates: 8°36′58″N 76°51′09″E

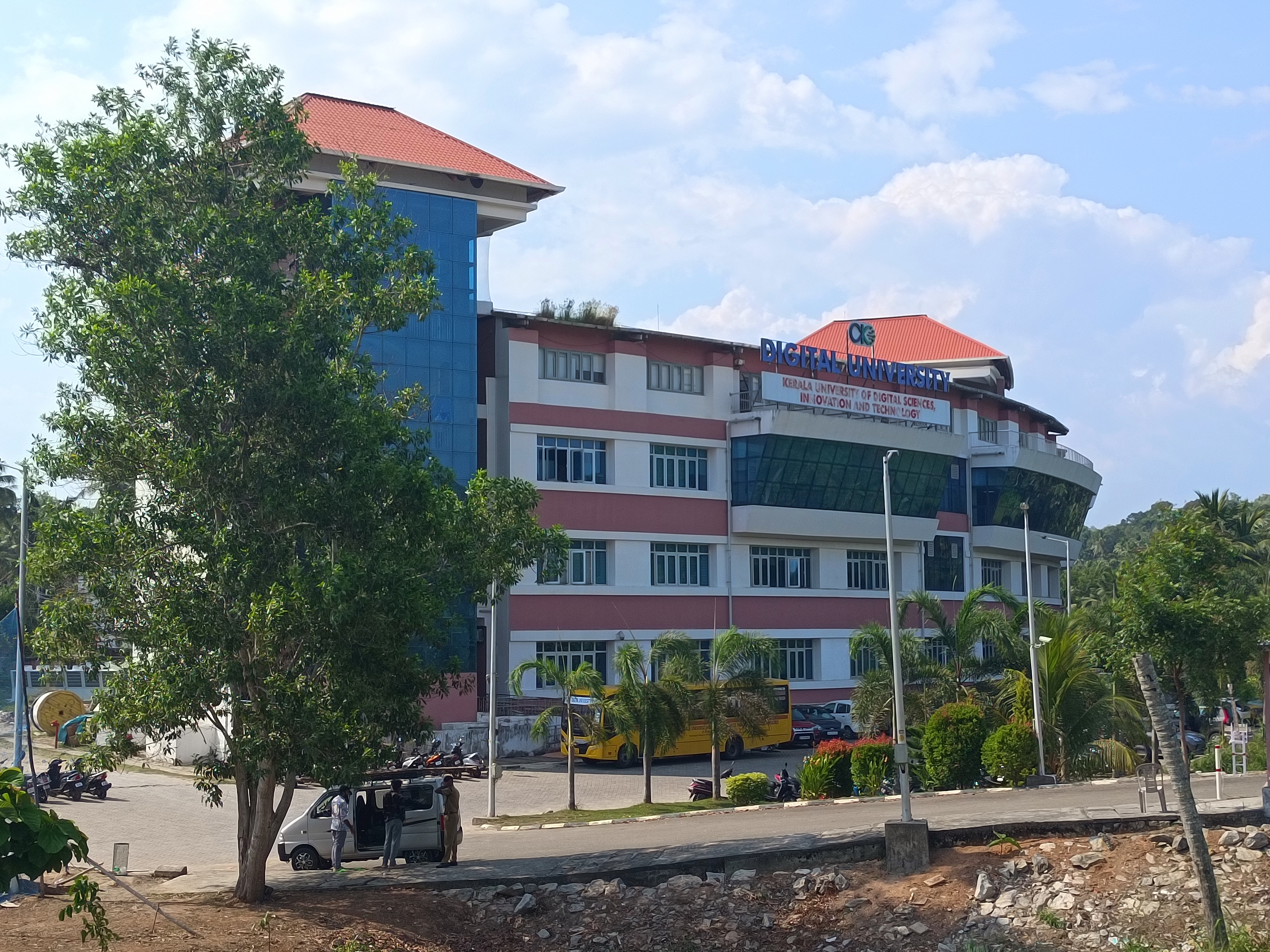
- Other name: Digital University Kerala (DUK)
- Former names: Indian Institute of Information Technology and Management, Kerala (IIITM-K)
- Motto: Curating a Responsible Digital World
- Type: State University
- Established: 1 July 2020; 6 years ago
- Chancellor: Governor of Kerala (ex officio)
- Vice-Chancellor: Dr. Saji Gopinath
- Pro Chancellor: P.K. Kunhalikutty, Minister for Information Technology (ex officio),
- Location: Thiruvananthapuram, Kerala, India
- Campus: Technopark Phase IV (Technocity), Pallippuram, Thiruvananthapuram district
- Website: duk.ac.in

Kerala University of Digital Sciences, Innovation and Technology, commonly known as Digital University Kerala (DUK), is a state university located at Technopark Phase IV (Technocity) in Pallippuram, Thiruvananthapuram district, Kerala, India. The university was constituted through the Kerala University of Digital Sciences, Innovation and Technology Ordinance, 2020 and later established under the Kerala University of Digital Sciences, Innovation and Technology Act, 2021 (Act 10 of 2021), which is deemed to have come into force on 1 July 2020.

== History ==
The Indian Institute of Information Technology and Management, Kerala (IIITM-K) was established in 2000 as a Government of Kerala institution. In 2020, IIITM-K was upgraded to a university through an ordinance promulgated by the Governor of Kerala, which was subsequently enacted as the Kerala University of Digital Sciences, Innovation and Technology Act, 2021.

== Campus ==
The university is located at Technopark Phase IV (Technocity), Pallippuram, Thiruvananthapuram, Kerala (PIN 695317).

== Organisation and governance ==
Under the founding ordinance, the Governor of Kerala serves as Chancellor (ex officio) and the state Minister in charge of Information Technology serves as Pro-Chancellor (ex officio). The university is constituted as a non-affiliating research and teaching university, with its governance and authorities defined in the ordinance and Act.

== Leadership ==
The Governor of Kerala is, by virtue of office, the Chancellor of the university and the Minister in Charge of Information Technology Department is the Pro-Chancellor of the university. The Government of Kerala had appointed Dr. Saji Gopinath as the first Vice-chancellor of the university.

== Vice chancellors of DUK ==
Vice chancellors of Kerala University of Digital Sciences, Innovation and Technology
No.	Name	Term of office		
No.	Name	Assumed office	Left office	Time in office
1	Dr. Saji Gopinath	8 July 2020	27 October 2024	4 years, 111 days
2	Dr. Ciza Thomas	27 November 2024	17 December 2025	1 year, 20 days
3	Dr. Saji Gopinath	18 December 2025	Incumbent	287 days

== Academics ==
Digital University Kerala offers postgraduate and doctoral programmes (including M.Tech, M.Sc, MBA and PhD), along with diploma and executive education programmes.

=== Schools ===
The university organises academic activities through schools, including:

- School of Computer Science and Engineering (SoCSE)
- School of Digital Humanities and Liberal Arts (SoDHLA)
- School of Digital Sciences (SoDS)
- School of Electronic Systems and Automation (SoESA)
- School of Informatics (SoI)

=== Earn While You Learn ===
The university implements an "Earn While You Learn" (EWYL) arrangement described by the university as paid internship opportunities for eligible students through university projects, aligned with the Government of Kerala's EWYL initiative.

== Centres and initiatives ==
The university hosts multiple centres and initiatives, including:

- Knowledge Centre
- Centre for Digital Innovations and Product Development (CDIPD)
- Centre for Executive Education and Continuing Studies (CEECS)
- Social Engagement Centre (SEC)
- Kerala Blockchain Academy (KBA)
- Cisco thingQbator
- Maker Village
- Digital Science Park

== Kerala Blockchain Academy ==
The institute also houses Kerala Blockchain Academy, second in the country. Kerala Blockchain Academy is also an associate member of the Hyperledger community.

== See also ==
- Technopark, Thiruvananthapuram
- Digital Science Park, Thiruvananthapuram
- Indian Institute of Information Technology and Management, Kerala
