= Kerala RRTS corridor =

Proposed Railway line in Kerala,India

The Kerala RRTS is a proposed railway network in Kerala.

== History ==
History of Kerala RRTS
Year	Event
2026 January	The Kerala Cabinet effectively shelved the SilverLine project and gave in-principle approval for a Thiruvananthapuram–Kasaragod Regional Rapid Transit System (RRTS) as an alternative after the Centre did not grant approval.

In January 2026, the Kerala Cabinet gave in-principle approval for a 583 km Regional Rapid Transit System (RRTS) corridor from Thiruvananthapuram to Kasaragod as a replacement for the stalled SilverLine plan after repeated refusals by the centre to sanction the latter. The RRTS proposal, modelled on the Delhi–Meerut RRTS corridor, aims to operate at speeds of approximately 160 to 180 km/h, mainly on elevated viaducts to minimise land acquisition and environmental disruption, and the transport department has been tasked with initiating consultations with the Union Government ahead of signing a memorandum of understanding.

In the Kerala Budget 2026–27, the state government allocated ₹100 crore for preliminary work on the RRTS project, with the Union Ministry of Housing and Urban Affairs reportedly extending support for its development, signaling early central engagement with the alternative scheme. Notably, it differs from the High-speed alternative corridor initially proposed by civil engineer E. Sreedharan as an alternative to K-Rail. Unlike other RRTS proposals that fall under the purview of the Railways act, the Kerla RRTS comes under the state ministry of housing and urban affairs and will fall under the Metro Act so that organisations such as the National Capital Region Transport Corporation (NCRTC) can help implement it. It is planned to use Namo Bharat trainsets.

Following a change in Government in the 2026 Kerala Election, the new Chief Minister of Kerala V.D Sateeshan officially cancelled the Silverline initiative. E. Shreedharan was reported to have received support from both the Union and state governments for the project, with DMRC as an additional consultant.

== Development ==
A study conducted by the Kerala Infrastructure Investment Fund Board concluded that an RRTS Corridor would be more economical to operate as compared to a high speed rail while being a practical and cost-effective solution to transportation in the state.The study also analysed rail traffic patterns to conclude that demand existed for medium distance journeys within the state.

The RRTS project will be built in four Phases, with a planned Operational length of 583 kilometers. Phase 1 will see the construction of the 284 km long Travancore Line from Thiruvananthapuram to Thrissur, and its integration with the planned Thiruvananthapuram metro and in-service Kochi Metro, with a targeted completion by 2033. This will be followed by Phase 2 called the Malabar Line from Thrissur to Kozhikode, alongside integration with the proposed Kozhikode Metro to be built by 2036. The Phase 3 & 4 lines will be built purely to augment capacity and extend the line to Kannur and Kasaragod.The project is estimated to cost approximately ₹1,92,780 crore.

The Kerala RRTS will be built on the Standard gauge on top of pillars, with embankments and tunnels used only where necessary. It will maintain an above ground clearance as various Metro systems in India. This viaduct model of the RRTS will reduce land acquisition costs, mitigates the obstruction of natural water flow, preventing the public opposition that has derailed the Silverline project. It is also envisioned to connect the four international airports in Kerala. Further extensions to Coimbatore via Palakkad,Kanyakumari via Thiruvanathpuram and Mangalore via Kasaragod are also planned.

E. Sreedharan, who was in charge of the development of K-rail, the SilverLine project has advocated for a 470-kilometer-long line that will cover the distance between Thiruvananthapuram and Kasargod within 3 1/2 hours. Twenty Stations will be built on this route.

In March 2026, the Central Government stated that they had not received the submission of a detailed project report from the state for additional financing for the project.

== See also ==
- Kerala High-Speed Rail
- SilverLine
- Golden Quadrilateral
- Amrit Bharat Station Scheme
