= Kerala High-Speed Rail =

Proposed high-speed rail corridor in Kerala, India

Overview
- Other name(s): Kerala High-Speed Railway; KHSR
- Status: Proposed
- Locale: Kerala
- Termini: Thiruvananthapuram; Kannur
- Stations: 23 proposed

Service
- Type: High-speed rail
- Rolling stock: B28 (Vande Bullet), E10 Series Shinkansen

Technical
- Line length: 473 km (294 mi)
- Character: Mostly elevated and underground
- Track gauge: 1,435 mm (4 ft 8 1/2 in) standard gauge
- Operating speed: 320 km/h (200 mph)

The Kerala High-Speed Rail, also referred to as the Kerala High-Speed Railway or KHSR, is a proposed high-speed rail corridor in the Indian state of Kerala. The proposal, associated with engineer E. Sreedharan, seeks to connect Thiruvananthapuram and Kannur through a mostly elevated and underground railway corridor.

The project emerged as an alternative proposal after delays and eventual cancellation of the SilverLine semi-high-speed rail project. It is separate from the Kerala government's proposed Regional Rapid Transit System corridor between Thiruvananthapuram and Kasaragod.

As reported in May 2026, the proposed corridor is about 473 km (294 mi) long, with a projected cost of about ₹60,000 crore. The proposal envisages a maximum design speed of 360 km/h (220 mph), an operating speed of about 320 km/h (200 mph), and an average commercial speed of about 280 km/h (170 mph).

== Background ==
Kerala has considered several proposals for faster north–south rail connectivity. The SilverLine project, promoted by K-Rail, proposed a semi-high-speed railway between Thiruvananthapuram and Kasaragod. The project faced opposition over land acquisition, environmental impact, cost and financial feasibility.

Following the delay of SilverLine, the Kerala government in January 2026 gave in-principle approval for a separate Thiruvananthapuram–Kasaragod Regional Rapid Transit System proposal. Sreedharan criticised the RRTS proposal, arguing that such systems were more suitable for shorter suburban corridors and could not replace a high-speed inter-city railway for Kerala.

In February 2026, Sreedharan opened a project office in Ponnani, Malappuram district, to work on a detailed project report for a high-speed rail proposal. The office was reported to include former Delhi Metro Rail Corporation officials.

== Proposal ==
The Kerala High-Speed Rail proposal was initially reported as a Thiruvananthapuram–Kannur corridor with possible extensions to other parts of Kerala and neighbouring states. Sreedharan stated that the project could provide faster travel across Kerala while reducing the land acquisition and displacement issues associated with SilverLine.

A revised proposal presented in February 2026 reportedly reduced the estimated cost from ₹86,000 crore to about ₹54,000 crore and proposed a 465 km (289 mi) corridor from Thiruvananthapuram to Kannur. The alignment included about 20 stations and was described as primarily elevated, with some underground sections.

In May 2026, reports stated that the updated proposal submitted to Chief Minister V. D. Satheesan envisaged a 473 km (294 mi) corridor costing about ₹60,000 crore. The proposed line would connect Thiruvananthapuram and Kannur in approximately three and a half hours.

== Status ==
Status of the Kerala High-Speed Rail proposal
Stage	Status	Description	Source
Concept proposal	Proposed	The high-speed rail corridor was publicly proposed by E. Sreedharan as an alternative to the earlier SilverLine project.	
Project office	Opened	A project office was opened in Ponnani, Malappuram district, for work related to the proposal.	
Revised alignment	Published	Sreedharan presented a revised alignment for the proposed corridor, including changes to the route and station list.	
Interim report	Submitted	Sreedharan submitted an interim report on the proposal to Chief Minister V. D. Satheesan in May 2026.	
State government review	Under consideration	The Kerala government was reported to be examining the proposal after scrapping the SilverLine project.	
Final approval	Not approved	No final approval, sanctioned detailed project report, funding closure or implementing agency had been reported as of May 2026.	
Construction	Not started	Construction had not started, and the project remained at proposal and review stage.	

== Route and alignment ==
The proposed corridor is planned to begin at Thiruvananthapuram and terminate at Kannur. The February 2026 alignment reportedly passed through Thiruvananthapuram Central, Thiruvananthapuram airport, Varkala, Kollam, Kottarakkara, Pathanamthitta, Thiruvalla, Kottayam, Vaikom, Ernakulam bypass, Nedumbassery airport, Thrissur, Pattambi, Malappuram, Karipur airport, Kozhikode, Koyilandy, Vadakara, Thalassery and Kannur.

A later revised alignment reportedly altered the northern section through hilly areas of Kozhikode and Kannur districts. Under the revised plan, stations at Balussery, Nadapuram and Koothuparamba were added, while earlier proposed stops at Koyilandy, Vadakara and Thalassery were dropped. Additional stations were also reported at Thrippunithura and Aluva in Ernakulam district and Chalakudy in Thrissur district, bringing the proposed total to 23 stations.

== Design and specifications ==
The proposal envisages a mostly elevated and partly underground corridor. Reports stated that the alignment would avoid large-scale embankments in order to reduce displacement and environmental impact.

The line is proposed to use standard gauge. The reported design speed is 200 km/h (120 mph), with a maximum operating speed of around 180 km/h (110 mph) and an average commercial speed of around 140 km/h (87 mph).

The trains are proposed to initially have 12 coaches and seating capacity for about 800 passengers. Platforms are proposed to be designed to accommodate 16-coach trains in the future.

== Cost and funding ==
The estimated project cost has changed across different versions of the proposal. In February 2026, the revised estimate was reported at around ₹54,000 crore to ₹56,500 crore. In May 2026, the updated proposal submitted to the Kerala government was reported at about ₹60,000 crore.

The May 2026 proposal reportedly suggested that 40% of the project cost, about ₹24,000 crore, would be raised through crowdfunding, while the remaining amount would be funded by the Union and state governments.

== Fares and ridership ==
Sreedharan reportedly proposed fares comparable to or lower than some existing inter-city transport options in Kerala. In February 2026, the proposed Thiruvananthapuram–Kannur fare was reported at ₹780. Other reports stated that the proposed fare structure would be lower than existing Vande Bharat Express services on comparable routes.

Manorama Online stated that Sreedharan expected about 45,000 passengers per day during the initial phase and up to five lakh passengers per day after full development of the project.

== Relation to SilverLine ==
The Kerala High-Speed Rail proposal gained public attention after the SilverLine project stalled. SilverLine had proposed a semi-high-speed corridor between Thiruvananthapuram and Kasaragod, but the project faced strong opposition over land acquisition, environmental issues and cost.

In May 2026, the United Democratic Front government led by Chief Minister V. D. Satheesan decided to scrap SilverLine and denotify land acquisition proceedings related to the project.

The KHSR proposal has been presented as an alternative to SilverLine, with supporters arguing that a mostly elevated and underground route could reduce the need for land acquisition.

== Relation to Kerala RRTS ==
The Kerala High-Speed Rail proposal is separate from the Kerala RRTS proposal. The RRTS proposal, approved in principle by the Kerala Cabinet in January 2026, envisaged a Thiruvananthapuram–Kasaragod regional rapid transit corridor.

Sreedharan criticised the RRTS proposal, stating that RRTS systems were designed for shorter suburban corridors and would not provide the average speeds required for state-wide inter-city travel. He argued that a high-speed rail corridor would be more suitable for Kerala's long north–south travel demand.

== Proposed extensions ==
Reports stated that possible future extensions could include a northern extension from Kannur to Mangaluru, a branch from Kozhikode to Kalpetta, feeder links towards Palakkad and Guruvayur, and southern extensions towards Parassala and Pamba.

These extensions had not received final approval as of May 2026 and remained conceptual.

== Reception ==
The proposal received support from some leaders of the Indian National Congress and the Bharatiya Janata Party, who argued that Kerala required a high-speed rail system and that Sreedharan's proposal could be more financially feasible than SilverLine.

The proposal also drew comparisons with the cancelled SilverLine project, with critics noting that any new corridor would still require detailed studies on cost, ridership, land acquisition, environmental impact and financial viability. As of May 2026, no final approval or sanctioned detailed project report had been reported.

== See also ==
- Silver Line (K-Rail)
- High-speed rail in India
- Regional Rapid Transit System
- Kerala RRTS corridor
- Transport in Kerala
- Kochi Metro
