= Payyanakkal =

Payyanakkal പയ്യാനക്കൽ
- Town
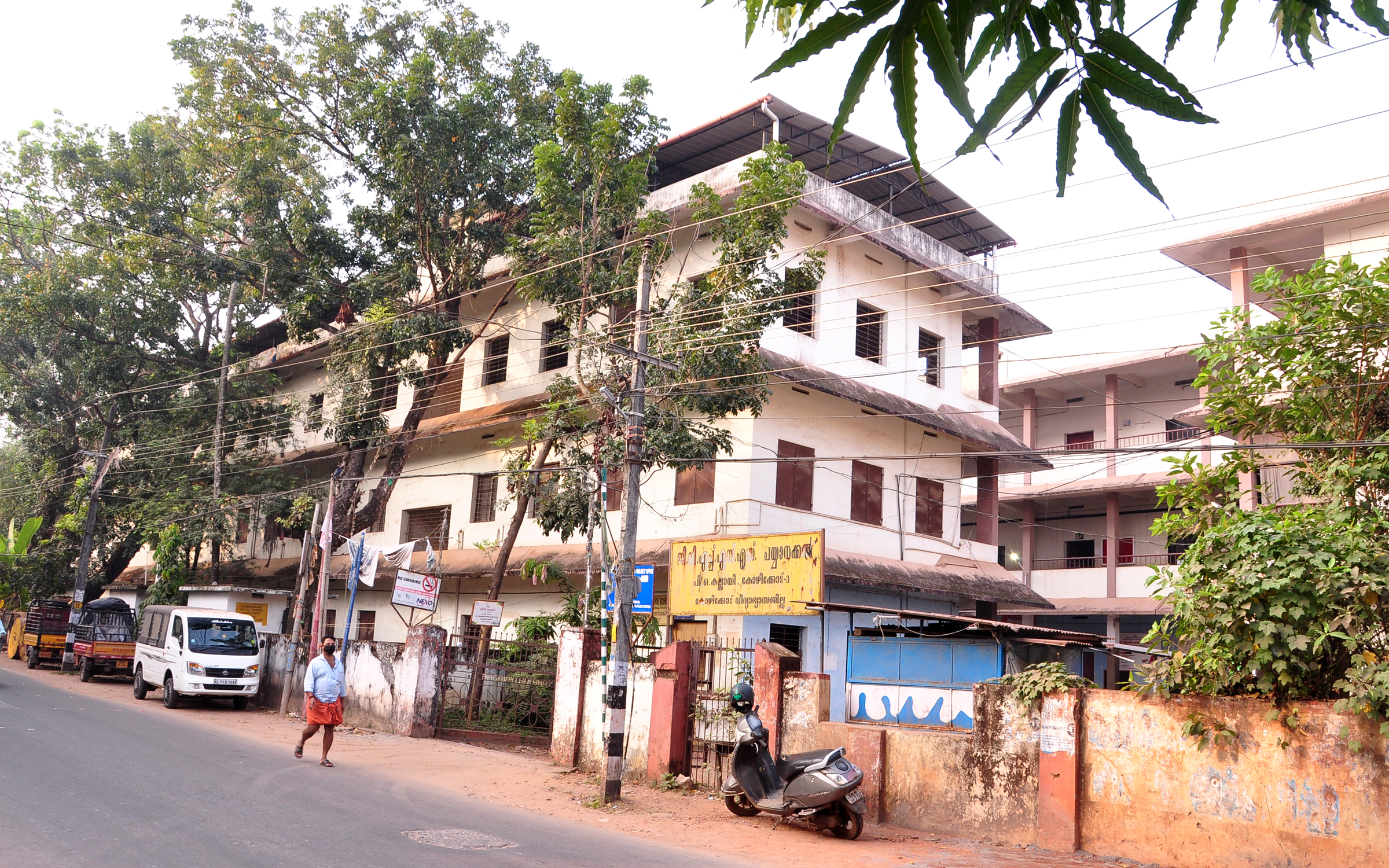
- Interactive map of Payyanakkal
- Coordinates: 11°13′22″N 75°47′12″E
- Country: India
- State: Kerala
- District: Kozhikode

Government
  - Body: Kozhikode Corporation
  - MP: M.K. Raghavan
  - MLA: Ahamed Devarkovil
- Time zone: UTC+5:30 (IST)

Payyanakkal is a small town in the south west area in Kozhikode Corporation, Kerala, India.

It is bounded by the Arabian Sea to the west, the Kallayi River to the north, a railway line to the east, and the old Beypore Panchayath boundary to the south. The Payyanakkal falls under Parliament Constituency Kozhikode.

Payyanakkal comprises places such as Chakkumkadavu, Kappakkal, Nadi Nagar, Koyavalappu and parts of Kallayi, Panniyankara & Kannanchery. Payyanakkal falls under Parliament Constituency Kozhikode represented by Sri. M.K. Raghavan and Kerala Legislature assembly "Kozhikode-South" represented by Sri. Ahamed Devarkovil. The entire Payyanakkal area (revenue ward 21) is represented in Kozhikode Corporaration by Sri. Musaffir Ahamed C.P. (Ward-54 Kappakkal), Smt. Jayasheela N (Ward-55) Payyanakkal) and Sri. Bijulal M (Ward-56 Chakkumkadavu).
