= Cheruvannur Nallalam =

Cheruvannur
- Census town
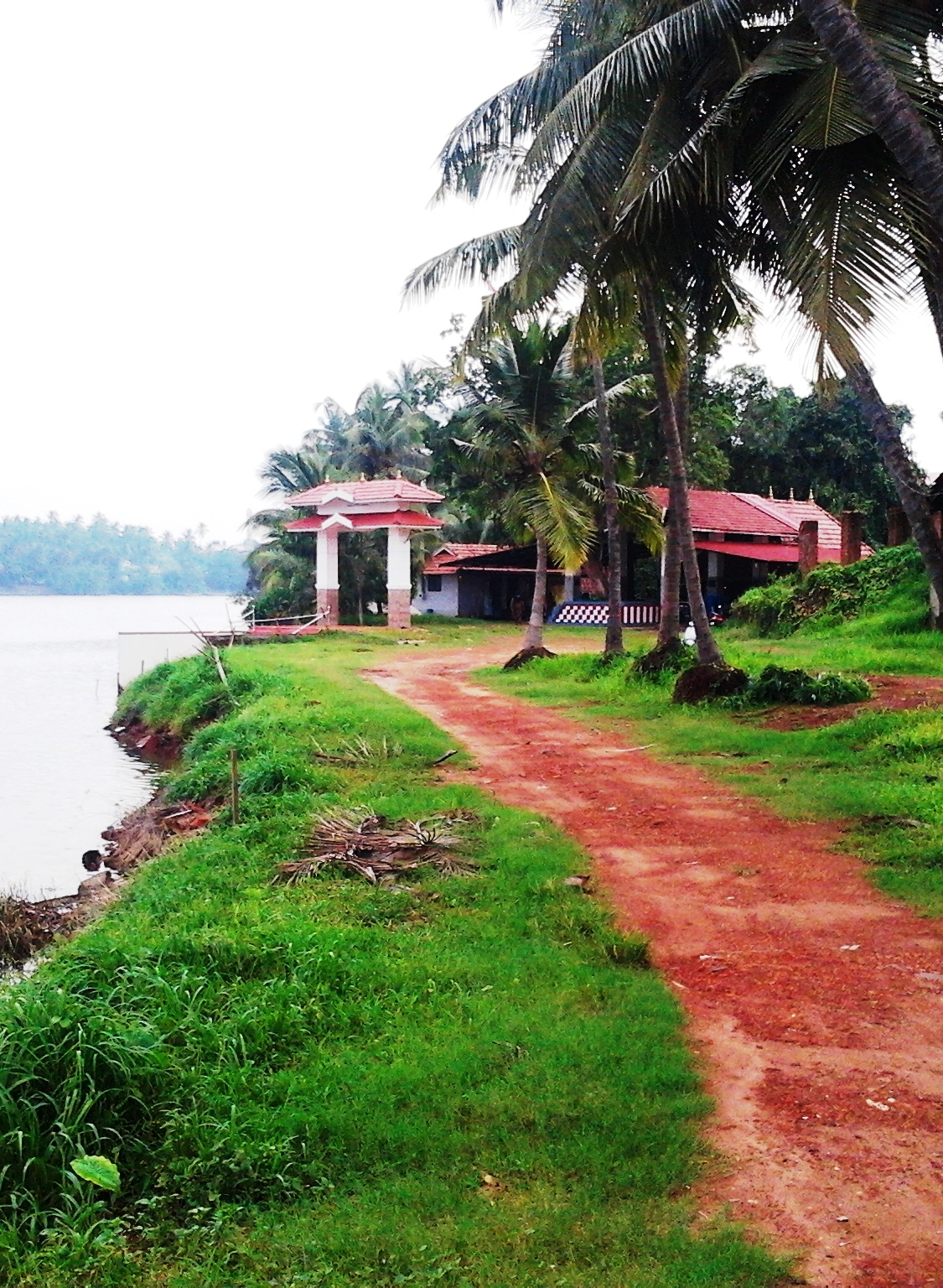
- Mamminikkadavu Temple
- Interactive map of Cheruvannur
- Coordinates: 11.195°N 75.820°E
- Country: India
- State: Kerala
- Region: South India
- District: Kozhikode

Area
  - Total: 10.31 km^{2} (3.98 sq mi)

Population (2011)
  - Total: 61,614
  - Density: 5,976/km^{2} (15,480/sq mi)

Languages
  - Official: Malayalam, English
- Time zone: UTC+5:30 (IST)
- Postal code: 673027
- Website: lsgkerala.in/cheruvannurnallalam

Cheruvannur is a census town and Cheruvannur-Nallalam Part of Kozhikode Corporation.

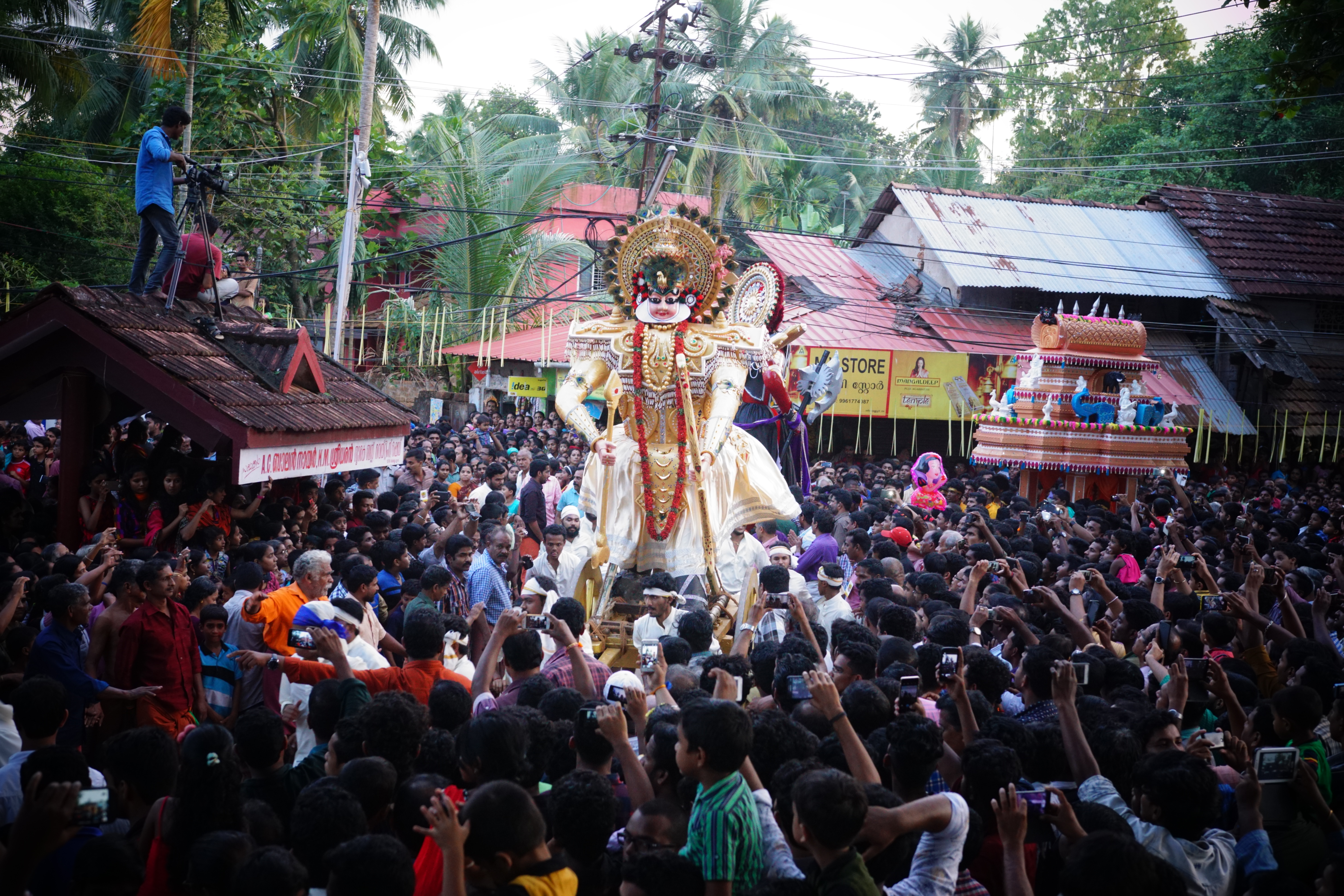
Cheruvannur festival

== Geography ==
Cheruvannur Nallalam municipality has a total area of 10.31 square kilometers. The adjoining local self-governing bodies are Olavanna, beypore, feroke and Ramanattukara Panchayaths and Kozhikode Municipal Corporation. The Chaliyar river, formerly known as Feroke River or Beypore River flows from east to west, through the southern side of Cheruvannur which separates the grama panchayat from Feroke and Ramanattukara. A man-made canal joining Chaliyar and Kallai River flows from southeast to northwest, through the north and east side of Cheruvannur Nallalam Panchayath, which separates the gram panchayat from Olavanna.

== Demographics ==
As of the 2001 India census, Cheruvannur has a population of 50556. Males constitute 49% of the population and females 51%. Cheruvannur has an average literacy rate of 92.7%, higher than the national average of 59.5%; with 96.62% of males and 88.91% of females literate.

== History ==
The history of Cheruvannur is related to the ayurvedic hospital named Chennur Aryavydyasala. Long ago, people from nearby villages came to the village for ayurvedic treatment. Later, when the panchayath was formed, it was named Cheruvannur panchayath, which later became a municipality.

== Economy ==
Due to the high amount of industrialization, more and more people from Tamil Nadu, Karnataka, Andhra, Orissa, and North and Central India have come to Cheruvannur. Nowadays people from outside Kerala have a crucial role in the economy of Cheruvannur.

== Industries ==
Cheruvannur and Feroke are the cradles of the tile industry in Kerala. The rapid rivers from the Western Ghats after passing through forests carry the clay, the raw material for tiles, pottery, and ceramic wares. Apart from the tile industry, there are a number of small- and medium-scale industries located in Cheruvannur, including footwear industries, food processing units, and machinery production units. Cheruvannur is one of the predominant industrial areas of Kozhikode. The number of tile factories and match factories located here, provide employment to thousands of workers. A steel complex is also located here.

== Suburbs ==
- Srambia, Sharadamandiram, Kolathara and Parappuram
- Vattakkinar, Kundayithode and Modernbazar
- Areekkad, Kannanchery, and Panniyankara

== Notable people ==
- Major Sandeep Unnikrishnan
