= Panniyankara =

Coordinates: 10°35′N 76°27′E

- suburb
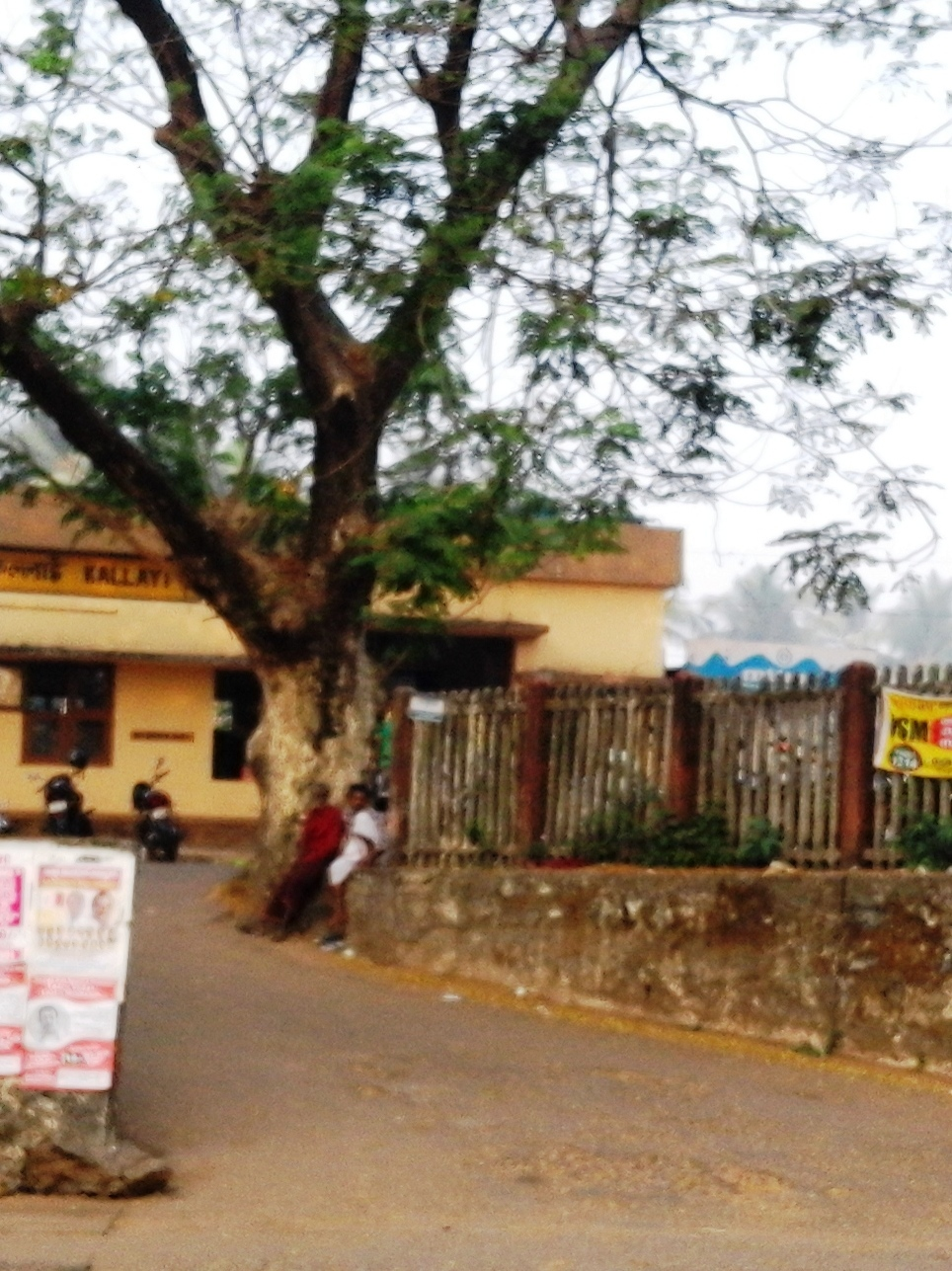
- Kallayi Railway Station, Panniyankara
- Interactive map of Panniyankara
- Country: India
- State: Kerala
- District: Kozhikode
- Elevation: 0.1 m (0.33 ft)

Malayalam, English
  - Official: Malayalam, English
- Time zone: UTC+5:30 (IST)
- PIN: 673 003
- Telephone code: 91 (0)495
- Vehicle registration: KL 11
- Nearest city: Kozhikode

Panniyankara is a suburb situated in Kozhikode district, Kerala, India. Panniyankara's surrounding cities include Kallai, Thiruvannur, Kannanchery, Vattakkinar, and Payyanakkal.

Panniyankara is proposed to have a monorail station once the Second phase of Kozhikode Monorail project is complete.

Panniyankara area is represented by Nirmala, an Independent Candidate from Kozhikode Corporation.

== Notable people ==
M. S. Baburaj (1929-1978), composer V. K. Krishna Menon (1896-1974), former Indian defence minister

== Major landmarks ==
- Parvathypuram Colony
- Princess of Wales Dispensary
- Panniyankara Police Station
- Madrassathul Alaviyya
- Government U.P.School, Kallai
- Panniyankara Library
- Odakkal Bhagavathy Temple
- Kizhakkemurigath sree bhagavathi temple
