= Sabarimala Railway =

Proposed railway line in the state of Kerala in India

Overview
- Status: Only reached Kalady
- Owner: Indian Railways
- Locale: Kerala
- Termini: Angamaly (Ernakulam); Erumeli (Kottayam)
- Stations: 20 (proposed)
- Website: www.sr.indianrailways.gov.in

Service
- Type: Regional rail Heavy rail Light rail
- Services: 1
- Operator: Southern Railway zone
- Depot(s): Kollam; Ernakulam
- Rolling stock: WDP-4

Technical
- Line length: 111 km (69 mi)
- Number of tracks: 1
- Track gauge: 1,676 mm (5 ft 6 in)

Sabarimala Railway is a proposed 111-kilometre (69 mi)-long railway line in Kerala, India, that will run from Angamaly to Erumeli. It was sanctioned in 1998 by Indian Railways. The line's name comes from the fact that it will provide a railway facility to pilgrims visiting the Sabarimala Temple (which number more than the total population of Kerala).

According to a memorandum of understanding signed between the state of Kerala and the Ministry of Railways on 27 January 2016, commercially viable railway projects will be identified and handed over to the Special Purpose Vehicle (SPV) to be fast-tracked on a 51:49 per cent equity basis. The SPV has discussed an extension to Punalur. The Sabari Railway project has been included under PRAGATI (PM-Proactive Government and Timely Implementation) and is monitored by the Prime Minister's Office.

The proposed railway line will relieve transportation problems in Idukki, Kottayam, and Pathanamthitta districts. Railways have agreed to start the project once the Kerala Rail Development Corporation gives a revised estimate for the project.

== Project details ==
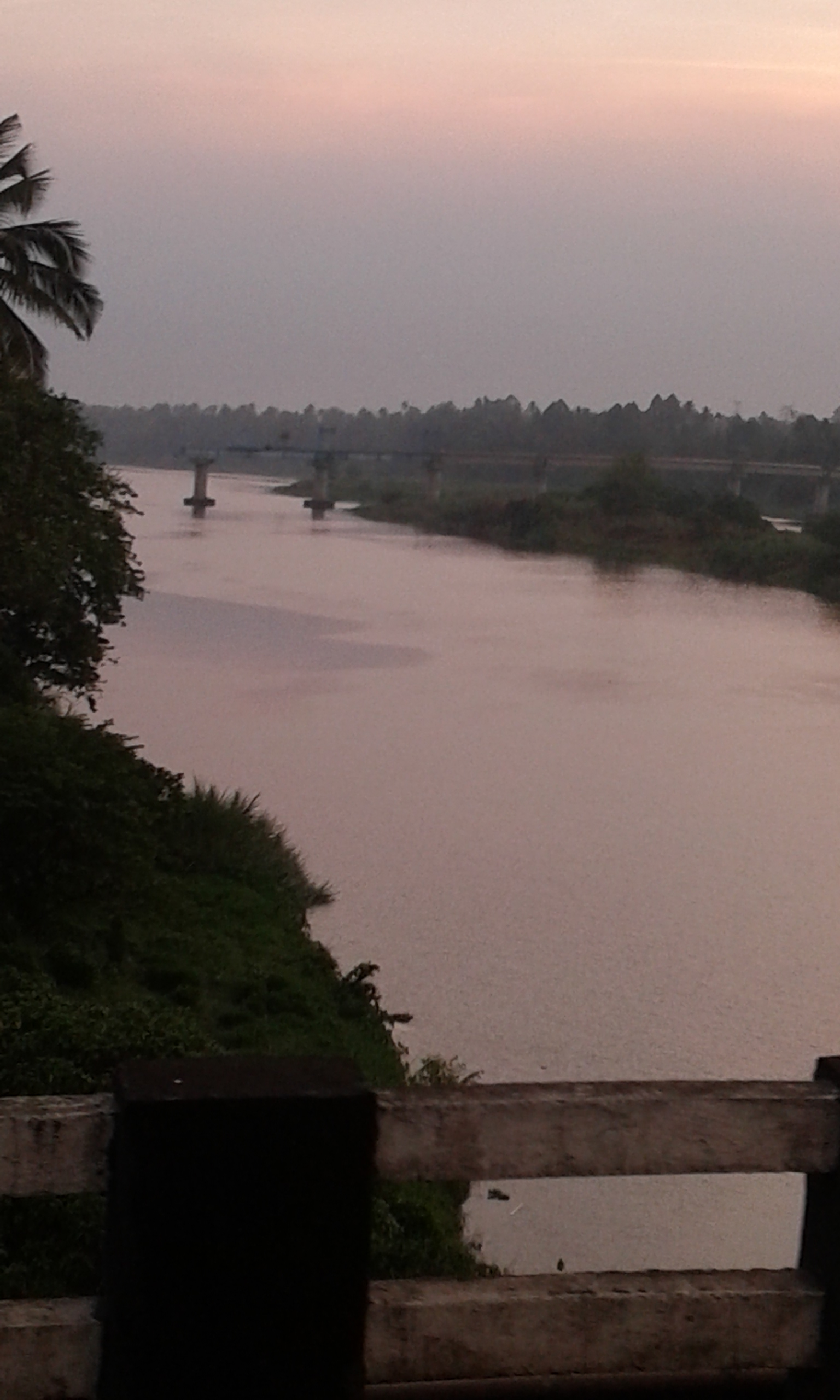
Sabarimala Railway construction across the Periyar river

The Sabarimala Railway is the first phase of a 250-kilometre-long Angamaly–Erumeli–Pathanamthitta–Punalur–Nedumangad–Thiruvananthapuram railway line, which will provide 25 new railway stations in five southern districts of Kerala. On 7 January 2021, the government of Kerala informed the Railway Board of its willingness to share 50% of the cost of the Angamali–Erumeli section. An amount of ₹2,000 crores was allocated to this project by the Government of Kerala through the 2021 state budget. The government has started land acquisition, and established special Thahasildhar offices at Perumbavoor and Palai in 2006 and at Muvattupuzha in 2010 for the process. The railway and revenue department have conducted a joint survey for the land acquisition of this railway line, laid a boundary stone for the acquired land, and notified for land acquisition up to the proposed Ramapuram station in Kottayam district. By 2010, 90% of railway line construction up to Kaladi railway station (a length of 7 kilometres (4.3 mi)) was completed.

The 111-kilometre (69 mi)-long Sabari Railway line was initially proposed in the 1997–98 railway budget. The project connects Angamaly to Erumeli—the gateway to the famous Sabarimala Temple—and serves as a third rail corridor for Kerala State, linking the Idukki district and suburbs in southeastern Kerala to the Indian Railways network. This new line has 14 stations, of which 10 are crossing stations and 4 are halt stations.

There is another proposal for a new line from Erumeli to Punalur for which a reconnaissance survey has been done by the railways. If completed, it will join the Kollam–Sengottai line, becoming a third route to Tamil Nadu from Kerala via that line.

== Stations ==
The Sabarimala Railway will traverse culturally, religiously, and commercially essential places and several tourist locations. The road traffic in this area has almost reached a saturation point, resulting in excessive delays and unpredictable roadblocks; the proposed railway line would alleviate these road travel hazards.

Sabarimala Railway

=== (phase 1) ===
- Angamaly Junction (railway station already exists)
- Kalady (railway station already constructed)
- Perumbavoor
- Odakkali
- Kothamangalam
- Muvattupuzha
- Vazhakulam
- Thodupuzha
- Karinkunnam
- Ramapuram
- Bharananganam for Pala
- Chemmalamattam
- Kanjirappally road
- Erumeli (Gateway of Sabarimala)

=== Proposed stations (phase 2) ===
- Erumeli Gateway of Sabarimala
- Sabarimala airport
- Ranni
- Pathanamthitta
- Konni
- Pathanapuram
- Punalur (railway station already exists)

=== Proposed stations (phase 3) ===
- Punalur (railway station already exists)
- Kadakkal
- Kilimanoor
- Venjaramood
- Nedumangad
- Kattakada
- Balaramapuram (railway station already exists)
- Vizhinjam Port

=== Station descriptions ===
1. Kalady is the birthplace of the humanitarian and philosopher Adi Sankaracharya. The place is home to many temples, including shrines dedicated to Sri Sankara, Sarada Devi, Sri Krishna, and Sri Ramakrishna. Festival celebrations here are solemn events that attract believers in large numbers. This location is called 'Crocodile Ghat' and attracts numerous visitors.

Marthoma Mandapam,at Malayattoor shrine hill church where relics of the Apostle St. Thomas are preserved, is also close to Kaladi. The Golden Cross at Kurishumudi is believed to have formed when St. Thomas knelt on a rock and signed a cross with his finger. Another sight at the hill is the permanent footprint and the marks of knees imprinted on the rock, which is believed to be that of St. Thomas. This hill shrine, over time, has emerged as one of the most famous and largest pilgrim centres in the name of St. Thomas in India, and thousands of devotees congregate here to get his blessings. A rice-based industrial cluster is located in Kaladi: 90% of the rice used in Kerala is processed through the industrial units at Kaladi.

1. Perumbavoor is home to 450 plywood manufacturing units. Irapuram KINFRA rubber industrial park is also found in Perumbavoor. Perumbavoor has 3.5 lakh migrant labours, working in various industrial units. The city is also a commercial center and the headquarters of Kunnathunaad Taluk. Thiruvairanikulam Temple is located near the Perumbavoor.It is also an important municipal town of Ernakulam district.
1. Kothamangalam is the gateway of famous tourist destination Munnar, Kashmir of east. Bhothathan kettu another tourist destination is around Kothamangalam. Kothamangalam is a Thaluk Headquarter and municipal town. Nellikuzhy, India' biggest furniture making cluster is adjacent to Kothamangalam.
1. Muvattupuzha is a growing urban centre and the headquarters of Muvattupuzha Taluk. Muvattupuzha is also a Municipal town. Several higher educational institutions are located here. KINFRA industrial park is situated in Nellad, near Muvattupuzha.
1. Thodupuzha is the commercial capital of Idukki district. Thodupuzha is a municipality has more than 50,000 population. It is headquarters of Thodupuzha taluk. Kinfra spices park at Muttam and Moolamattom FCI godown are very near to Thodupuzha town. It is also rapidly growing commercial center of central Kerala.
1. Barananganam for Pala the Tomb of St. Alphonsa, located in Bharananganam Shrine church near Pala. It is one of biggest pilgrim center of Kerala, visited by thousands of Christian devotees. It is also the gateway to famous hill stations like Vagaman, Elappara, and Illikkakallu.

Pala is one of the essential education centers of Kerala and the second largest commercial center of Kottayam district. It is the headquarters of Meenachil Taluk. Nearby ancient Christian pilgrim centers include Pala old church, Cherppungal church, Kizhathadiyoor church, and Lalam old church.

1. Kanjirapally is a center of rubber production in Kerala. It is also a commercial center and the headquarters of Kanjirapally Taluk. It will be the nearest railway station for tourist centers and hill stations like Thekkady, Peermedu, Parunthumpara, and Kuttikkanam.
1. Erumeli is the gateway to the Sabarimala shrine temple. Pettathullal, or Petta Kettu, is a historic ritualistic dance held annually at Erumeli. An essential element is 'Kanni Ayyappas', where the first-timers to Sabarimala must participate in the thullal by having an arrow.

Visiting the Vavar mosque at Erumeli by the Ayyappa devotees is an essential ritual of Sabarimala pilgrimage. Erumeli is also called the center of the religious fraternity of the country. A survey was conducted for the extension of the Sabari railway line to Punaloor via Ranni, Pathanamthitta, Konni, Pathanapuram, which would thereby connect it with Kollam–Sengottai railway line.

== Sabari Railway Project Timeline ==
1. Railway has conducted preliminary engineering survey for Angamali -Sabarimala railway during 1996.

2. Government of India has sanctioned the project in 1997-98 railway budget as item no.7 of pink book with total cost of Rs. 550 crores.

3. Railway has conducted final location survey of the project during 2002.

4. Railway board vide letter number 93/W1/Survey /SR/11 dated 7/1/2004 has informed the decision to terminate the project at Azhutha short of reserve forest due to the objections raised by Ministry of Environment.

5. Government of Kerala has published notification for the acquisition of land for the construction of Angamali -Sabarimala railway line project on 2005.

6. Government of Kerala has started Special Thahasildhar offices at Perumbavoor and Pala to acquire land for the project on 2006

7. Government of Kerala has included the Angamali - Sabari railway land acquisition on fast track vide G.O.(Ms)2/08/Trans dated 15/1/2008

8. Meeting conducted by Minister of state for railway with MPs on 7/12/2010 has decided to terminate the project at Erumeli instead of Azhutha on the bases of the recommendation of EIAS

9. Government of Kerala vide G.O. (Ms) 1/ 2021/Trans has decided to share the cost of the project with railways

10. Government of Kerala has withdrawn the cost sharing stand during the video conference of Hon. Prime Minister with Chief Secretary on Sabari Railway land land acquisition & inclusion of the project in PRAGATI platform.

11. Revenue Department, Government of Kerala has completed the Social Impact Assessment (SIA)Study to acquire land for Angamali-Sabarimala railway line project in Kunnathunad taluk during March 2019.

12. Through letter dated 26/9/2019 Railway has shared the decision to freeze the Angamali- Sabarimala project due to the with drown of state government from cost sharing commitment.

13. Even though draft Social Impact Assessment Study report of Angamali-Sabarimala railway line for Muvattupuzha and Kothamangalam taluk is prepared in 2020, hearing for the land owners and elected representative of the project is yet to be conducted.

14. After lot of deliberations and representations from the public, in 2021 Government of Kerala had again taken a decision to share 50% cost of the Project. Accordingly, Government of Kerala had issued a Government Order No. G.O (Ms)1/2021/TRANS dated 07.01.2021 for sharing 50% of the cost of the Project and the Railway Board had been informed regarding the same.

15. The Railway Board through letter No. 93/W1/Survey/SR/11 dated 19.02.2021 advised Kerala Rail Development Corporation Limited (KRDCL) to prepare the revised detailed estimate for the Project. Accordingly, KRDCL had taken action to prepare the detailed estimate.

16. Chief Minister has sent letter dated 18-9-2021 to the Railway Minister assuring the cost sharing of Angamali-Erumeli, Sabarimala rail way line project, requesting to defreeze the project and execute the project in two stages for minimizing further delay in project implementation .

17. Railway Board has directed the zonal offices to examine the possibility of providing railway connectivity to towns having more than 50,000 population. The inclusion of Nedumangad Municipality in the list has increased the chance for expansion of the Sabari railway to Thiruvananthapuram.

18. Revised detailed estimate of the Project amounting to Rs. 3454.09 Crores was submitted by KRDCL to Southern Railway on 09.06.2022 and the Detailed Project Report (DPR) of the Project was sent to Southern Railway on 18.06.2022.

19. Chief Minister has sent a reassurance letter dated 23/3/2023 to the Railway Minister on cost sharing of Angamli-Sabarimala railway line project.

20. Railway Board has instructed KRDCL to update the revised detailed estimate with the capacity for Vandebharat train service.

21. KRDCL has resubmitted the revised estimate of Angamali-Sabarimala railway line project amounting Rs. 3810.69 crores to Southern Railway on 1/7/2023

22. Joint representation of 26 MPs of Kerala has submitted to the Railway Minister, Government of India dated 2/8/2023 for a prioraty to Angamali-Sabarimala railway project implementation.

23. Southern railway wide letter dated 6/11/2023 the Chief Administrative Officer- finance has approved the revised estimate (amounting Rs. 3801 crores) of the new BG line between Angamali- Sabarimala ( Pink Book No. 7 of 1997-98 & Pink Book No. 2 of 2023–24)

24. Chief Engineer- Construction of Southern Railway, Ernakulam wide letter 21/12/2023 has informed the Transport Secretary, that the revised estimate worked out based on 50: 50 cost sharing has approved by the Chief Administrative Officer - Finance of Southern Railway and requested to update the revised estimate with the signature of a competent authority of government of Kerala before submitting the same to railway board.

25. Transport Secretary, Government of Kerala, wide letter dated 6/6/ 2024 has requested to Railway Board, chairman to extend Angamali -Sabari railway up to up comminng Vizhinjam port through Rail Sagar project via Pathanamthitta, Punaloor and Nedumangad.

26. Sri.Abdul Rahman, State Railway Minister, sent a letter to the Railway Minister, Government of India dated 16/6/2024 for the priority to construct Angamali Sabari Railway.

27. At a meeting on June 3–4, 2025, Union Railway Minister Ashwini Vaishnaw, Kerala CM Pinarayi Vijayan, and Kerala Railways Minister V Abdurahiman gave the green light to proceed with the project.
