= Kerala Rapid Transit Corporation Limited =

Transportation company in India

- Type: State owned SPV
- Industry: Public transport
- Founded: 5 December 2012; 13 years ago Thiruvananthapuram, Kerala, India
- Headquarters: Thiruvananthapuram, Kerala, India
- Area served: Kerala
- Key people: Dr Vinay Goyal IAS (Managing director)
- Services: Thiruvananthapuram Metro, Kozhikode Metro
- Owner: Government of Kerala
- Website: krtl.in

Kerala Rapid Transit Corporation Limited, abbreviated to KRTCL, is a special purpose vehicle (SPV) formed to implement light metro projects in Kerala. Kerala has light metro systems planned for the cities of Kozhikode and Thiruvananthapuram. The SPV is fully owned by the State Government and the Chief Minister is the Chairman of the company. The head office of KRTCL is at Thiruvananthapuram, with branches at Kozhikode and Thiruvananthapuram. Earlier it was Kerala Monorail Corporation Ltd. Since monorail was not financially viable, DMRC proposed light metro.

== History ==
Administrative sanction was given in October 2012 to begin monorail projects in Kozhikode and Thiruvananthapuram. KMCL was given control of the Thiruvananthapuram Monorail project on 26 November 2012. The government had handed over the Kozhikode Monorail project to the KMCL prior to that. The state government received approval to float KMCL from the registrar of companies and was incorporated on 5 December 2012. KMCL's first board meeting was held in Thiruvananthapuram on 18 December 2012. At the meeting, it was decided to open KMCL offices in the two cities.

On 12 June 2013, the State Cabinet gave clearance for an agreement to be signed between KMCL and DMRC, that would make the latter the general consultant for the monorail projects in Kozhikode and Thiruvananthapuram. The DMRC will receive a consultancy fee of 3.25% of the ₹ 5,581 crore (₹ 3,590 crore for Thiruvananthapuram and ₹ 1,991 crore for Kozhikode). The agreement was signed on 19 June 2013.

== See also ==
- Kozhikode Metro
- Thiruvananthapuram Metro
- Urban rail transit in India
