= Kerala Rail Development Corporation =

Public sector railway infrastructure company in Kerala, India

Kerala Rail Development Corporation Limited
- Type: Public sector undertaking
- Industry: Rail transport
- Founded: 3 January 2017; 9 years ago
- Headquarters: Thiruvananthapuram, Kerala, India
- Area served: Kerala
- Services: Railway infrastructure planning and development
- Owner: Government of Kerala and Ministry of Railways, Government of India
- Website: keralarail.com

Kerala Rail Development Corporation Limited, also known as K-Rail or KRDCL, is a public sector joint venture company established by the Government of Kerala and the Ministry of Railways, Government of India. The company is based in Thiruvananthapuram, Kerala, and is involved in the planning and development of railway infrastructure projects in the state.

KRDCL was incorporated on 3 January 2017. Its stated functions include preparation of detailed project reports, project surveys, obtaining statutory and administrative approvals, and implementing railway-related infrastructure projects in Kerala.

== Projects ==
=== Thiruvananthapuram–Kasaragod Semi-High-Speed Rail Upgrade (Broad Gauge Integration) ===
The Thiruvananthapuram–Kasaragod Semi-High-Speed Rail Upgrade will be a major transport modernization concept focused on cutting down travel times across Kerala by upgrading and augmenting the existing Indian Railways broad-gauge network. Moving away from standalone standard-gauge greenfield models, this strategy leverages the existing broad-gauge corridor to achieve operational speeds of 160 km/h, with a maximum design speed capability of 200 km/h. To navigate densely populated areas and regions where surface land acquisition is unfeasible, the framework incorporates engineering solutions such as elevated bypass viaducts and underground tunneling.

=== Thalassery–Mysore new broad-gauge line ===
The Thalassery–Mysore new broad-gauge line is a proposed railway line intended to connect Thalassery in Kerala with Mysore in Karnataka. The project has been examined as a possible inter-state rail link between northern Kerala and southern Karnataka. According to earlier project material published by KRDCL, the proposed line was estimated at approximately 240 kilometres (150 mi) in length.

Proposed specifications
Scope	Detail
Route	Thalassery to Mysore
Proposed length	240 kilometres (150 mi)
Gauge	Broad gauge
Status	Proposed

=== Nilambur–Nanjangud railway line ===
The Nilambur–Nanjangud railway line is a proposed broad-gauge railway project intended to connect Nilambur in Malappuram district, Kerala, with Nanjangud in Karnataka. The line has been proposed as a shorter rail connection between Kerala and Karnataka, particularly between central Kerala and the Mysore region.

Earlier proposals for a railway connection through this region date back to the colonial period. KRDCL has listed the project among proposed rail infrastructure works, with earlier project material describing a route length of approximately 176 kilometres (109 mi).

=== Ponnurunni coaching terminal proposal ===
KRDCL submitted a feasibility report to Southern Railway for a proposed coaching terminal at Ponnurunni in Kochi. The proposal involved redevelopment of railway land for passenger train handling, maintenance, stabling and related railway operations.

The feasibility study was reported to include plans for platforms, pit lines, parcel lines, stabling lines and other railway infrastructure. The proposal was intended to address operational constraints in the Kochi region, but it remained subject to railway approval and further implementation decisions.

=== Sabari railway line ===
The Sabari railway line is a proposed railway line from Angamaly towards Erumely, associated with improved rail access to the Sabarimala region. The project was sanctioned by Indian Railways in 1998 but has faced delays over funding, alignment, land acquisition and implementation issues.

KRDCL has expressed interest in participating in the project under the joint venture model for railway infrastructure development in Kerala.

=== Kozhikode–Sultan Bathery Rail Corridor ===
The Kozhikode–Sultan Bathery Rail Corridor is a proposed 73.5 km high-speed rail line conceptualized by E. Sreedharan and DMRC as the initial phase of Kerala's high-speed transit expansion. Aiming to bridge coastal Kozhikode with Wayanad in just 35 to 45 minutes, it serves over 50,000 daily commuters. The line stops at Koduvally, Adivaram, Kalpetta, and Sultan Bathery, offering potential future integration toward Mysuru.

To safely cross the fragile Western Ghats without ecological destruction, the design features a 20 km twin-tunnel system excavated 400 meters underground via Tunnel Boring Machines (TBMs) with portals positioned outside protected forest areas. Operating completely on solar power, the project incorporates emergency ambulance coaches and night-time roll-on/roll-off cargo transit.

Estimated at ₹15,000 crore, funding relies on a 60% combined Central-State contribution paired with 40% public crowdfunding. Environmental activists have extended conditional support pending hydrological and geological evaluations, while the proposal awaits ₹5 crore from the Kerala state government to draft its Detailed Project Report (DPR).

== Defunct projects ==
=== SilverLine semi-high-speed rail corridor ===
The SilverLine project was a proposed semi-high-speed rail corridor between Thiruvananthapuram and Kasaragod. The proposed corridor was planned to cover approximately 529.45 kilometres (328.98 mi) and was intended to reduce travel time between the two cities to about four hours. The project was proposed as a double-line railway corridor with trains designed for speeds up to 200 kilometres per hour (120 mph).

The proposal attracted public debate over land acquisition, environmental concerns, financing, and technical approval from railway authorities. As of 2026, the project had not received final approval from the central government and was reported as stalled. In January 2026, the Government of Kerala gave in-principle approval to pursue a separate Regional Rapid Transit System proposal between Thiruvananthapuram and Kasaragod after the SilverLine proposal did not receive central approval.

Proposed specifications of SilverLine
Scope	Detail
Route	Thiruvananthapuram to Kasaragod
Proposed length	529.45 kilometres (328.98 mi)
Proposed maximum speed	200 kilometres per hour (120 mph)
Proposed travel time	About 4 hours
Proposed number of stations	11
Status	Stalled / not approved

== Regional Rapid Transit System proposal ==
In January 2026, the Government of Kerala gave in-principle approval for a proposed Regional Rapid Transit System corridor between Thiruvananthapuram and Kasaragod. The proposal was reported after the SilverLine project failed to obtain central approval. The proposed RRTS corridor was described as a separate project and not a continuation of the original SilverLine alignment.

== See also ==
- Rail transport in India
- Transport in Kerala
- Kochi Metro
- Kerala Rapid Transit Corporation Limited
- Sabarimala Railway
