= Thiruvananthapuram Metro =

Metro project

Overview
- Owner: Government of Kerala
- Locale: Thiruvananthapuram, Kerala, India
- Transit type: Rapid Transit
- Number of lines: 2
- Number of stations: 38 (including 2 underground station)

Operation
- Began operation: TBD
- Operation will start: TBD
- Operator: Kochi Metro Rail Limited
- Character: Elevated, Underground
- Train length: 3 Coaches

Technical
- System length: 42.1 km (including 2 lanes)
- No. of tracks: 2
- Track gauge: 1,435 mm (4 ft 8 1/2 in) standard gauge
- Electrification: 750 V DC third rail
- Top speed: 80 km/h (50 mph)

Thiruvananthapuram Metro is a proposed rapid transit system in the city of Thiruvananthapuram, the capital of the Indian state of Kerala. Earlier, there was a plan to build a light metro system in the city. However, the plan was later changed to a conventional metro system.

== History ==
Thiruvananthapuram's first attempt to build a rapid transit system for the city failed, when its proposal to build a metro rail system was rejected by the Delhi Metro Rail Corporation (DMRC) in the 2000s. The Government of Kerala, then entrusted the National Transportation Planning and Research Centre (NATPAC), an autonomous research body under the State Government, to conduct the feasibility study of the proposal to build a monorail system in Thiruvananthapuram. The feasibility study was conducted by a core team comprising five scientists of NATPAC and various survey teams. Topographic studies, identification of stations and surveys were the main components of the study.

The state government had initially asked the state transport department to prepare a detailed project report (DPR). However, the DMRC was later entrusted with the task. DMRC principal advisor E. Sreedharan submitted the DPR to Chief Minister Oommen Chandy on 11 December 2012. A special purpose vehicle (SPV) was created in October 2012. The Thiruvananthapuram Monorail project was assigned to the KMCL on 26 November 2012. The government had handed over the Kozhikode Monorail project to the KMCL prior to that.

On 12 June 2013, the state cabinet gave clearance for an agreement to be signed between KMCL and DMRC. The DMRC will receive 3.25% of the ₹ 55.81 billion (₹ 35.90 billion for Thiruvananthapuram and ₹ 19.91 billion for Kozhikode) in general consultant fees. The agreement was signed on 19 June 2013.

Global tenders were floated for the Thiruvananthapuram Monorail. The deadline for technical bids was extended from 1 October 2013 to 15 October. However, a consortium led by Bombardier Transportation was the only firm that expressed an interest before the deadline. Pre-bid queries had also been made by Japanese firm Hitachi, Malaysian firm Scomi, and firms from the United Kingdom, South Korea, and China. The tender for the proposed project only received one bid, so a second tender had to be issued. The deadline for bids was extended again to 15 April.

Bombardier Transportation, Hitachi, Afcons, Scomi, and Larsen and Toubro expressed interest in the second round of tender submissions. A pre-bid meeting was held in New Delhi on 20 February 2014. Bidding on the Kozhikode and Thiruvananthapuram projects was delayed by the model code of conduct coming into effect prior to the 2014 Lok Sabha elections.

On 28 August 2014, the State Government decided to use Metro, instead of Monorail, in Thiruvananthapuram and Kozhikode, mainly due to cost overruns. Though slightly costlier, Metro has several advantages, such as easy raising of capacity, DMRC's expertise in the field and more companies who can bid for the project.

The new Thiruvananthapuram Metro is based on the Comprehensive Mobility Plan (CMP) for the city, which projected a high traffic volume in the future. According to the plan, the proposed Thiruvananthapuram Metro will have two corridors covering 42.1 km, connecting significant parts of the city. The Kochi Metro Rail Ltd (KMRL) submitted a DPR to the state government, marking a significant milestone in the development of this project.

In the 2025-2026 Kerala Budget, Finance minister KN Balagopal announced that work on the first phase of the Thiruvananthapuram Metro will commence in 2025-26, while plans are also being developed for the Kozhikode Metro.

The Detailed Project Report (DPR) for the proposed Thiruvananthapuram Metro project has been submitted by the Delhi Metro Rail Corporation (DMRC) to Kochi Metro Rail Limited (KMRL), the designated implementing agency for the project on 1st July 2026.

== Plan ==
The Thiruvananthapuram line will start from Technocity and terminate at Pallichal covering a distance of 27.4 km with 24 stations, along the old NH 47. Slight accommodations were made for the proposed flyovers at Kazhakuttam, Sreekaryam and Ulloor. Special spans are proposed where the line crosses the railway line at Railway Km 221/6-8. The car depot is located on a 12.5 hectares of Government land near the CRPF Camp at Pallipuram.

The second route of 14.7 km was planned from Killipalam to Kazhakoottam via Technopark, Lulu Mall, Chacka and Eanchakkal. Eanchakkal to Killipalam is proposed as underground lane.

=== Phase 1 ===
Route	Terminals		Length	Stations	Opening date
Route 1	Technocity	Pallichal	24.4 km	TBA	
Route 2	Kazhakoottam	Killipalam	14.7 km	TBA	
Total			39.1 km		2029

== Cost ==
The cost of the project, based in April 2012 prices, was ₹27.0256 billion (US$290 million) excluding taxes of ₹4.75 billion (US$51 million). The cost to construct each kilometre of the metro was estimated as ₹ 1617.1 million. The Design, Build-Operate-Transfer (DBOT) mode was proposed. The State and Union governments were to each pay 20% of the cost, and the rest was to be paid by other investors such as banks.

In the 2012 State Budget, finance minister K. M. Mani, allotted ₹200 million (US$2.1 million) for the Thiruvananthapuram project. The project will be financed in part by a 5% state government surcharge on petrol and diesel sales. The surcharge is expected to bring in ₹ 2.50 billion per year.

The operation and maintenance costs are divided into three major parts - staff costs, maintenance cost which include expenditure towards upkeep and maintenance of the system and consumables, and energy costs.

In 2015, the cost for the Technocity - Karamana section was revised to ₹ 4,219 crore.

== Rolling stock ==
Each train will be made up of 3 coaches on the formation - leading car / intermediate car / leading car. The length and width of the cars will be 18m and 2.7m respectively. The total length of train will be approximately 54m.

== Track Elevation development ==
The Thiruvananthapuram Corporation faced huge challenges for elevated Viaduct in the city. This caused as most of the suburbs of the cities have roads that don't have broader length. In July 2019 Kerala Chief Minister Pinarayi Vijayan addressed that the route will not bound the NH 66 (Kovalam Bypass); instead, it will enter the Thampanoor through Sreekariyam, Kesavadasapuram and Pattom, one of Thiruvananthapuram's busiest suburbs.

== Fare ==
Proposed fares for the metro vary from a minimum of ₹8 for two km to ₹30 for 18–24 km. However, the minimum fare projected for 2019 is ₹11 and the maximum ₹42.

== Monorail proposals ==
Representatives of Hyundai Rotem proposed in 2012 to use Maglev technology for setting up a mass rapid transport system in the city.

On 28 August 2014, the state government decided to build a conventional rail metro rather than a monorail, as with then under construction Kochi Metro, in both Thiruvananthapuram and Kozhikode, mainly due to the prohibitive costs cited by prospective manufacturers.

== Personal Rapid Transit ==
A Personal Rapid Transit (PRT) system in Thiruvananthapuram has been proposed by INKEL ltd. A shift of 40% of the car and auto rickshaw travellers to the new system is expected. The PRT will function as a feeder mode of transport to supplement the metro.

The project will be completed in two phases. The first will be from Pallipuram to Thampanoor and the second from Thampanoor to Neyyattinkara. Thirty-five stations are proposed and the track will pass through Vellayambalam, Palayam, Statue, Overbridge, East Fort and Thampanoor.

The approximate cost of the project is ₹ 60 crore per kilometre and it can be completed in 24 to 30 months.

Finance Minister K.M. Mani allocated ₹ 2.5 million in the 2012-13 State Budget for preliminary work on the PRT in Thiruvananthapuram and Kottayam.

The project is expected to be completed in 24 months from date of commencement.

== See also ==
- Kerala Mono Rail Corporation
- Thiruvananthapuram
- Kochi Metro
- Kozhikode Monorail
- Rapid transit in India
