= Kozhikode Metro =

Proposed mass rapid transport system (MRTS) in India

Overview
- Locale: Kozhikode, Kerala, India
- Transit type: Rapid Transit
- Number of lines: 1 (Phase I)
- Number of stations: 22 (Phase I)

Operation
- Operation will start: TBD
- Operator: Kochi Metro Rail Limited
- Character: Elevated
- Train length: 3 Coaches

Technical
- System length: 44 kilometres (27 mi)
- No. of tracks: 2
- Track gauge: 1,435 mm (4 ft 8 1/2 in) standard gauge
- Electrification: 750 V DC third rail
- Top speed: 80 km/h (50 mph)

Kozhikode Metro is a proposed rapid transit system for the city of Kozhikode, in India. In 2010, the State government explored the possibility of implementing a metro rail project for Kozhikode city and its suburbs. The proposal was to have a corridor connecting Meenchanda to the Kozhikode Medical College Hospital through the heart of the city. An inception report was submitted by a Bangalore-based consultant, Wilber Smith, on the detailed feasibility study on the prospect of implementing the Mass Rapid Transport System (MRTS) and Light Rail Transit System (LRTS) in the city. However, the project has been scrapped to be replaced by Kozhikode Metro project.

The Kozhikode Light Metro project was actively pushed by the UDF government under Chief Minister Oommen Chandy, with the foundation stone laid in March 2016 for a 13.3-km stretch. Chandy's administration aimed to mirror the success of the Kochi Metro by initiating works, but the project later faced delays and administrative changes after the LDF government took over.

The State Cabinet then decided to form a special purpose vehicle (SPV) to implement monorail projects in Kozhikode and Thiruvananthapuram, and administrative sanction was given in October 2012. The state government issued orders entrusting the Thiruvananthapuram Monorail project to the KMCL on 26 November 2012. The government had handed over the Kozhikode Monorail project to the KMCL prior to that. On 12 June 2013, the State Cabinet gave clearance for an agreement to be signed between KMCL and DMRC, that would make the latter the general consultant for the monorail projects in Kozhikode and Thiruvananthapuram. The DMRC will receive a consultancy fee of 3.25% of the ₹ 55.81 billion (₹ 35.90 billion for Thiruvananthapuram and ₹ 19.91 billion for Kozhikode). The agreement was signed on 19 June 2013.

However, due to cost overrun and the cold response from the bidders the project was put on hold. Bombardier Transportation was the only bidder for the project. The project was later scrapped and Light metro was proposed.

In the 2025-2026 Kerala Budget, Finance minister KN Balagopal plans to develop the Kozhikode Metro project after the completion of the Thiruvananthapuram Metro.

Later, the plans was changed to make a full fledged Metro instead of a lite Metro, citing the cost for building lite metro will be higher due to importing of components, but due to the regular Metro having robust production facility in india it would be the one having lower cost.

== History ==
=== The proposal ===
The Union Urban Development Ministry decided to consider the proposal for a Metro in Kozhikode after the success of the Delhi Metro and signed up for drawing the detailed project report (DPR) of the Rs.27.71 billion Kozhikode metro transport project with Delhi Metro Rail Corporation as a feasibility study for the introduction of suburban services in Kozhikode city. The Ministry decided to bear 50% of the cost of the preparation of the DPR for the city that comes under the population cut-off bracket. The preliminary feasibility study had been carried out by the National Transportation Planning and Research Centre (NATPAC) in association with the Kerala Road Fund Board in December 2008. Based on this feasibility report, the Board entrusted Wilber Smith to conduct the study in June 2009. Already, the NATPAC has submitted a metro rail project covering a total distance of 32.6 km from Karipur to the Kozhikode Medical College. The cost of the project was estimated at Rs. 27.71 billion and was expected be completed within five years. The monorail project which replaced the metro rail project was estimated to cost Rs 1,991 crore has received a bid from the lone bidder Bombardier consortium, and was almost double of the estimate. The project was scrapped and the Light Metro has been approved.

=== Proposed route ===
As per the proposal for Metro, it would start from Karipur Airport, touching Ramanattukara, Meenchanda, Mini- Bypass, Arayadathupalam and culminate at the Medical College. An estimated 2,083,000 people would get the benefits of the new transportation system by 2031. The project, which can be partly finished within three years, will be economically and technically feasible. However the detailed project report prepared by Delhi Metro Rail Corporation, the alignment for Kozhikode Monorail is retained for the Light metro project.

=== The funding ===
The Union government was in favour of implementing the project with private participation, ruling out its own financial involvement. The Ministry of Urban Development and the Planning Commission were also against government investment in the project, and refused to accept it as a project in line with the Delhi Metro and Chennai Metro. The political rivalry between the earlier Left Front government in Kerala and the UPA government at the Centre was a major reason for such developments and the slow down in the project. The change in government in Kerala changed that scenario, making the Kozhikode Metro one of the top priorities of the UDF government. But later, not to affect the Kochi Metro project The Kerala cabinet under the Chief Ministership of Oommen Chandy decided to give clearance only for the Kozhikode Monorail project, replacing the Metro rail project.

The newly proposed Light Metro is proposed to be implemented as government initiative expecting a viability gap funding from the central and state government. Remaining fund is expected to be sourced internally and externally form competent agencies.

== Proposes ==
The project was proposed to cover a distance of 14.2 km with 15 stations, from Medical College Hostel to Meenchanda. The car depot was proposed to be located about 500 metres (1,600 ft) east of the Medical College Hostel station on 5.20 hectares (12.8 acres) of vacant land owned by the government.

The monorail was proposed to be built in two phases. The first from Medical College to Mananchira and the second from Mananchira to Meenchantha. Approximately 10.65 ha (26.3 acres) of land was to be required for the project, of which 80% is government-owned land.

Phase	Terminals		Length (km)	Stations	Opening date
Phase I	Medical College	Mananchira			
Phase II	Mananchira	Meenchanda			
Total	Medical College	Meenchanda	14.20	15	

=== Stations ===
Kozhikode monorail was proposed to have a total of 15 stations.

Map of possible routes

#	Station Name	Opening	Connections
1	Medical College Hostel		None
2	Medical College		None
3	Chevayur		None
4	Thondayad		None
5	Kottuli		None
6	New Bus Stand		Private inter-city buses
7	KSRTC		KSRTC buses
8	Mananchira		None
9	Palayam		Private intra-city buses
10	Railway Station		Indian Railways
11	Pushpa		None
15	Kallayi		None
13	Panniyankara		None
14	Vattakkinar		None
15	Meenchanda		None

=== Planned future expansion ===
The government had planned to extend the monorail to Civil Station and West Hill. It would have required ₹600 crore (US$64 million) for the 6-kilometre (3.7 mi) stretch connecting Malaparamba and Civil Station.

== Rolling stock ==
Each train will be made up of 3 coaches on the formation - leading car / intermediate car / leading car. The length and width of the cars will be 18m and 2.8m respectively. The total length of train will be approximately 59.94 m.

Each train has a capacity of approximately 800 passengers. The metro is designed to carry 30,000 passengers per hour.

== See also ==
- Kochi Metro
- Urban rail transit in India
