= Silver Line (K-Rail) =

Proposed rail line in India

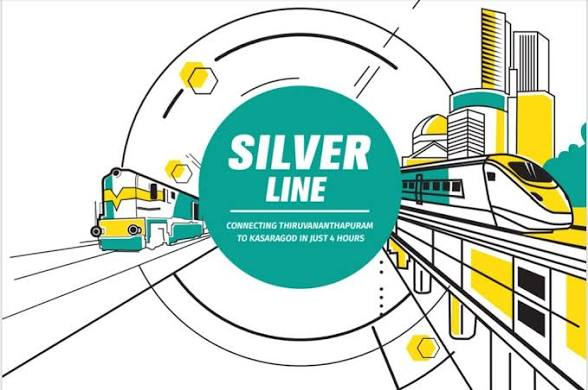

Overview
- Status: Shelved
- Owner: K-Rail (Kerala Rail Development Corporation)
- Locale: Kerala, India
- Stations: 11
- Website: keralarail.com

Service
- Type: Higher-speed rail
- Depot: Kollam

Technical
- Line length: 532 km (331 mi)
- Number of tracks: 2
- Character: Elevated, underground, surface and grade-separated, dedicated passenger tracks
- Track gauge: 1,435 mm (4 ft 8 1/2 in) standard gauge
- Electrification: 25 kV 50 Hz AC (Overhead lines)
- Operating speed: 200 km/h (120 mph) (average); 220 km/h (135 mph) (maximum)
- Signalling: ETCS Level 2

The Silver Line, also known as K-Rail, was a proposed semi-high-speed rail corridor in Kerala, India, intended to connect Thiruvananthapuram and Kasaragod. The proposed corridor was planned to cover approximately 530 kilometres (330 mi) with an operating speed of 200 kilometres per hour (120 mph), a maximum design speed of 220 kilometres per hour (140 mph), and structures designed for 250 kilometres per hour (160 mph). The project aimed to reduce travel time between Thiruvananthapuram and Kasaragod to under four hours, compared with the existing rail journey time of around 10 to 12 hours.

The proposed stations included Thiruvananthapuram, Kollam, Chengannur, Kottayam, Kochi, Thrissur, Tirur, Kozhikode, Kannur, and Kasaragod. The project later stalled amid public opposition, technical objections, and delays in receiving approval from the central government. In January 2026, the Government of Kerala gave in-principle approval to a Thiruvananthapuram–Kasaragod Regional Rapid Transit System proposal, which was reported as an alternative to the stalled Silver Line project. The project is temporarily halted by the state government till the Central government approval.

The Detailed Project Report of the project is being prepared by K-Rail (Kerala Rail Development Corporation Limited), a joint venture company between Ministry Of Railways and Government of Kerala.

The railway line aims to ease transport congestion between the northern and southern regions of the state, whilst also improving travel times and mitigate climate change. The project includes a roll-on/roll-off (RORO) train service that conveys road vehicles, and enhanced feeder public transport services from stations. In November 2022, the Kerala government recalled the revenue officials, who were deployed to conduct a social impact assessment study for land acquisition due to massive protests.

== Background ==
Kerala has 162,000 kilometres (101,000 mi) of roads which is 4.2% of India's total length. The existing railway network in the state is also not suitable for faster travel. The average speed of journey by rail and road in the state is about 30% to 40% lower than in the neighbouring states.

The journey becomes even slower in the rainy seasons because of deterioration in the condition of the roads and railway lines. Because of the adverse terrain, there is little scope of economically raising speed of trains on the existing railway line in the corridor. With the above in mind, the Government has decided to build the Thiruvananthapuram - Kasaragod corridor as a Semi high-speed line, covering the coastal region which is the most densely populated region of the state.

Kerala, being a densely populated state, most of the commuters depend on the conventional modes of transport. The proposed Silver Line (SHSR) will bring about a remarkable change in local commute, by improving the travel time and quality of transportation. There will be a substantial reduction in road accidents due to the reduction of congestion on roads. This also includes the last mile connectivity using aggregate services and feeder services, which will transform the people's perception towards public transportation. The Silver Line (previously called as SHSR) will also be duly integrated with the existing Indian Railway network for the benefit of interstate and long distance travellers.

== Environmental and social impact ==
The studies regarding the environmental impact have not yet been completed. Environmentally, materials like manufactured sand, rock and wood materials need to be considered.

Transport systems bring enormous benefits to society providing access and mobility that are essential for modern societies and economic growth. However, transport activities have many undesirable external impacts as well, such as CO_{2} emissions, congestion, accidents, land use and many more. The urge to fight these challenges is therefore pushing economies towards more efficient, and sustainable solutions.

Silver Line is claimed to be a suitable alternative as it saves time, resources, and helps in reduction of carbon footprint by relying on renewable energy sources for its stations, providing last-mile connectivity to and from the station using electric vehicles (EVs), and facilities for parking/charging EVs at the stations. The proposed RORO services also contribute in reducing pollution and congestion compared to road transport of goods vehicles.

== History ==
History of Kerala Semi High-speed rail
Year	Event
2009 February	Kerala Finance Minister Thomas Isaac announced Thiruvananthapuram-Kasaragod high-speed rail corridor
2010 February	Initial planning for Kerala HSR by Chief Minister V. S. Achuthanandan
2011 September	Special-purpose vehicle formed for the project extending up to Mangalore by CM Oommen Chandy
2012 June	DMRC submitted a feasibility study report with an est. cost of ₹127 billion (US$1.3 billion)
2014 October	CM Oommen Chandy's stated that the project is now stalled due to protests
2016 June	Kerala Government, headed by CM Pinarayi Vijayan, asked DMRC to submit the DPR
2019 January	Government of Kerala decided to wind up Kerala HSR project, found unviable due to high project cost
2019 May	Survey report by France-based Systra said a semi high-speed rail project across Kerala could be financially viable est. cost ₹56 billion (US$580 million)
2019 December	Government of Kerala named the Semi-High Speed Rail Project as 'Silver Line'. Estimated cost ₹56,443 crore
2020 January	Hyderabad-based GeoKno India Private Limited completed an aerial survey for Kerala 'Silver Line' project
2020 January	Kerala Government decided to set up land acquisition cells in 10 districts to acquire 1,226.45 hectares for 'Silver Line' project
2020 April	On 16 April, the Kerala Rail Development Corporation (K Rail) Board approved the DPR of 'Silverline Kerala'. One additional station(Kochi Airport) added in the route.
2020 June	On 10 June, the Government of Kerala approved the revised alignment of 57.5 km Vadakara-Thalassery stretch of 'Silverline Kerala' to reduce displacement and avoid bifurcating Mahe.
2020 October	The project proposal has been tabled before the Railway Board for approval
2021 February	Ministry of Railways and Railway Board have not approved the project yet. Finance Minister wrote to the Kerala CM for speeding up the land acquisition and financial plan related discussions with JICA for the Kerala Silverline project.
2021 May	Housing and Urban Development Corporation Kerala granted ₹3,000 crore loan for acquiring land for the first phase (Kochuveli to Chengannur) developments.
2022 November	The state government decided to temporarily halt the SilverLine project till the Centre gives approval.
2026 January	The Kerala Cabinet effectively shelved the SilverLine project and gave in-principle approval for a Thiruvananthapuram–Kasaragod Regional Rapid Transit System (RRTS) as an alternative after the Centre did not grant approval.
2026 May	The UDF government’s Kerala Cabinet officially cancelled the SilverLine project, citing lack of central approval, environmental concerns, financial viability issues, and public opposition.

The Thiruvananthapuram–Mangalore high-speed rail corridor was mooted in the 2009-10 budget speech of the LDF government. The project was cleared by the State Cabinet in February 2010. The Kerala State Industrial Development Corporation (KSIDC) was appointed as the nodal agency to develop the project.

In September 2011, a special purpose vehicle, the Kerala High Speed Rail Corporation Ltd. (KHSRC) was formed to implement the project. The Ministry of Railways has stated that the project is feasible and has expressed full support for the project. The Delhi Metro Rail Corporation (DMRC) conducted the pre-feasibility study of the project. The KHSRC requested the DMRC to submit a detailed project report (DPR) for the project by November 2012. However, the DPR faced several delays.

In February 2014, the Indian media reported that the state government shelved the project. The Times of India quoted unnamed sources as stating, "It has not been scrapped officially, but it is at a dead stage. The estimated project cost has almost doubled now, and the more the delay, the costlier the project would become." The cost of constructing the project was estimated to be ₹1.80 lakh crore (US$19 billion), much higher than the originally estimated ₹1 lakh crore (US$10 billion). 80% of the cost was proposed to be funded by JICA, and the remaining 20% by the State and Central governments.

In March 2014, T. Balakrishnan, Chairman and Managing Director of KHSRCL, denied that the project had been scrapped. In October 2014, Kerala Chief Minister Shri Oommen Chandy stated that the government wished to implement the project, and that the project was stalled due to protests. He also stated that the survey had been completed and the project would be implemented only with the support of people.

In June 2016, the newly elected Left government asked the DMRC to complete the DPR. The DMRC submitted the detailed project report (DPR) to the state government in July 2016. The DMRC proposed constructing a 430-kilometre (270 mi) line from Kochuveli in Thiruvananthapuram up to Kannur, with an option to extend the line up to Mangalore in a later phase. The Union Government approved the DMRC's draft report on 9 July 2016.

In August 2016, the KHSRCL announced that it would conduct survey to determine public opinion of the proposed alignment. The survey is intended to prevent any possible protests over land acquisition and suppress dissent from opponents of development projects in the state. The results of the survey, published in February 2017, found that 86% of the 13,447 people interviewed across 110 assembly constituencies in 11 districts were in favour of the project. Only 9% of those surveyed opposed the project, while 5% remained neutral. 73% of the respondents were aware of the project before being interviewed. Of those who had not heard of the project, 82% expressed support, while 88% of those who were aware expressed support. Supporters of the project believe that it will reduce travel time, reduce greenhouse gas emissions and accidents, and generate development in the state. Opponents of the project argue that the project will result in large-scale displacement of people as a result of land acquisition, take away the livelihood of farmers whose land is acquired, waste a large sum of money, and reduce the number of trees.

In 2019, a survey by French consultant company Systra found that the Kochuveli-Kasaragod rail corridor could be financially viable. Systra found that the project can recoup 6% of its cost every year after linking Thiruvananthapuram and Kochi airports. The state agency, Kerala State Remote Sensing and Environment Centre (KSERC), is supposed to submit the survey report by March 2020. After land acquisition order, a detailed project report (DPR) will be prepared by the Government of Kerala.

In January 2026, the Kerala Cabinet gave in-principle approval for a 583 km Regional Rapid Transit System (RRTS) corridor from Thiruvananthapuram to Kasaragod as a replacement for the stalled SilverLine plan after repeated refusals by the Centre to sanction the latter. The RRTS proposal, modelled on the Delhi–Meerut RRTS corridor, aims to operate at speeds of approximately 160 to 180 km/h, mainly on elevated viaducts to minimise land acquisition and environmental disruption, and the transport department has been tasked with initiating consultations with the Union Government ahead of signing a memorandum of understanding. In the Kerala Budget 2026–27, the state government allocated ₹100 crore for preliminary work on the RRTS project, with the Union Ministry of Housing and Urban Affairs reportedly extending support for its development, signaling early central engagement with the alternative scheme.

== Project details ==
Project Specifications
Project title	Silver Line
Total distance	532.185 km (330.684 mi)
Travel time	less than 4 hours
Maximum speed	220 km/h (140 mph)
Maximum operating speed	200 km/h (120 mph)
Number of stations	11
Proposed project cost	₹63,940.67 crore (US$6.6 billion)
Tracks	2 (up & down)
Rolling stock	9 coaches initially
Expected daily ridership	67,740 pax

In August 2021, the Revenue Department of Thiruvananthapuram published a list of survey numbers for land confiscation. Kerala Infrastructure Investment Fund Board approved a loan of Rs 2100 crores for buying these lands from respective owners of these plots.

Estimated time duration
Proposed Station	Distance	Time duration
Thiruvananthapuram	Start	0 min
Kollam	55 km	24 min
Chengannur	109 km	48 min
Kottayam	149 km	1 hr 3 min
Kochi	195 km	1 hr 26 min
Kochi Airport	220 km	1 hr 35 min
Thrissur	259 km	1 hr 54 min
Tirur	317 km	2 hr 19 min
Kozhikode	358 km	2 hr 37 min
Kannur	449 km	3 hr 16 min
Kasaragod	532 km	3 hr 52 min

== Plan ==
Kerala will get a special railway corridor along its 532-kilometre (331 mi) length, as the state government is set to build a ₹66,079 crore (US$6.9 billion) rail line that will enable semi-high speed trains ply between upstate Kasaragod and the capital city of Thiruvananthapuram. The semi-high-speed corridor from Thiruvananthapuram to Kasargode would not have any level crossings. K-Rail will have to acquire about 1,200 hectares (3,000 acres) for the project that will have the rails elevated along urban stretches. The trains will run at a maximum speed of 200 kilometres per hour (120 mph). They will initially have nine coaches, and the number will be subsequently enhanced to 12. The travel charge is projected to be ₹2.75 per km (2.4¢ US/mi), and there will be an annual hike of 7.5 per cent.

K-Rail expects a ridership of 67,740 passengers a day. It estimates to carry 1,330 travellers in one direction at peak hours. For meeting the expenses of the ₹66,079 crore (US$6.9 billion) project, ₹34,454 crore (US$3.6 billion) will come as loans. The Centre and state will need to provide ₹7,720 crore (US$800 million) each. The Kerala government will spend ₹8,656 crore (US$900 million) on land acquisition and allied matters. The rest of the expenses will be met through other loans by the union and state governments. The rail line will pass through 11 of the state's 14 districts, and will stop at ten stations. Up its northward course from Thiruvananthapuram, these stations will be Kollam, Chengannur, Kottayam, Kochi, Kochi Airport, Thrissur, Tirur, Kozhikode and Kannur before reaching Kasaragod. The SilverLine corridor will be 100% green project. K-Rail is set to adopt last-mile connectivity, with multi-modal integration, system-driven e-vehicle public transport system, charging as well as parking stations, which would take the state to next generation of urban mobility. The project will also adopt the latest world-class rail system technology like signalling system of ERTMS level-2 with automatic train control system, ticketing, communication, fully air-conditioned rolling stock with modern passenger amenities. The main depot for the line will be located near the Kochuveli terminus.

== Protests ==
There are many protests against K Rail initiative due to access of private land without a proper compensation and assent. Several people were arrested for non-cooperation.

== See also ==
- High-speed rail in India
- Vande Bharat Express
- K-Rail (Kerala Rail Development Corporation)
