= Kannanchery =

- town
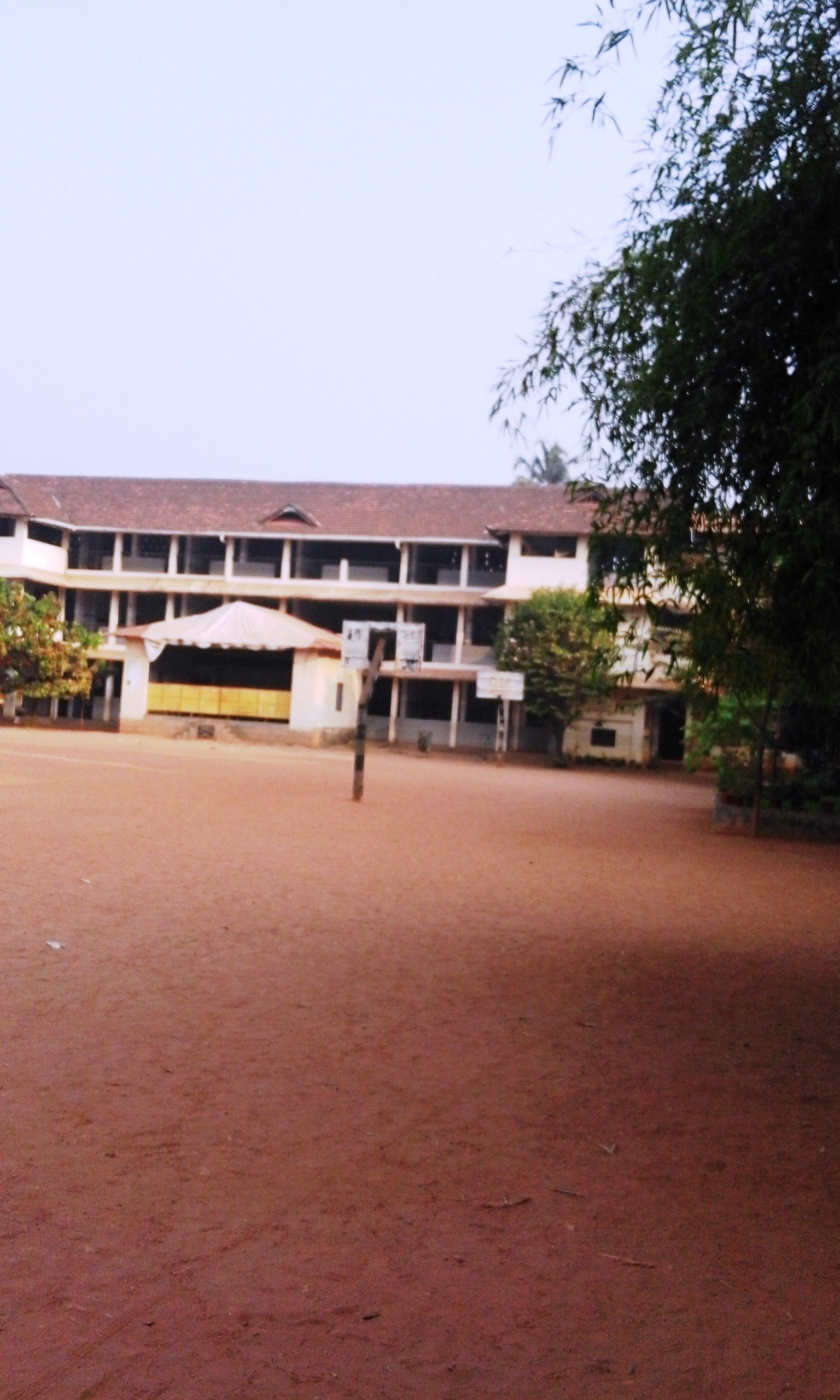
- Ramakrishna Mission Highschool, Kannanchery

- Location in Kerala, India
- Coordinates: 11°13′0″N 75°47′0″E
- Country: India
- State: Kerala
- District: Kozhikode

Languages
  - Official: Malayalam, English
- Time zone: UTC+5:30 (IST)
- PIN: 673003
- Telephone code: 0495
- Vehicle registration: KL-11
- Nearest city: Kozhikode
- Literacy: 96.8%
- Website: www.kozhikodecorporation.org

Kannanchery is a suburb in Kozhikode City, situated 4 kilometers from its center.

== Description ==
Kannanchery or (Kannancheri) is a developing suburb in Kozhikode city. Kannancheri is famous because of the Kannancheri Sree Maha Ganapathi Temple and its festivals and rituals. It is located in the middle of Vattakinar, Thiruvannur, Panniyankara and Meenchanda. There are two mosques and up to 7 small and main temples are located in this place. There is one huge pond near the Kannancheri SreeMaha Ganapathy temple and another small pond at Kottiyaat Sree Bhagavathi Temple.

This place once used to be a weaver's village. This street/theru was given to weavers by zamoothiri king. Now many people have migrated from various places and they all are trying to make this place developed and are undergoing good manners. Two bus waiting sheds are in place, Nearest railway station is at Kallai. There are few education institutions located in this area. Mr. Nambidi Narayanan and Shri. Nirmala is the present ward councillor of Kannanchery.

== Education institutions ==
- Kannanchery Government LP School
- Ramakrishna Mission School
- Bright Academy
- Excel Pre-Primary School
