= Kallayi River =

River in Kerala, India

Coordinates: 11°13′N 75°47′E

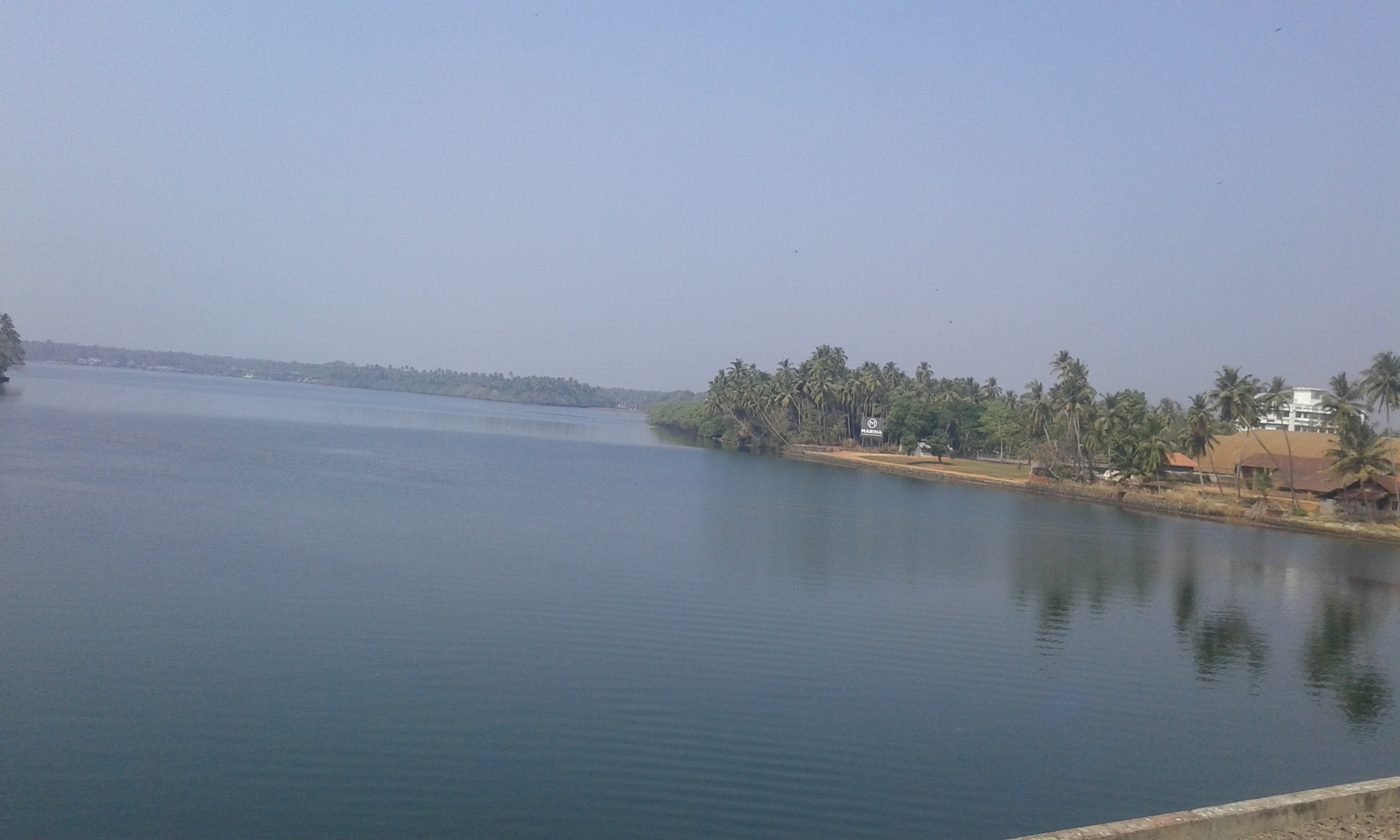
Kallai River

Kallayi is one of the rivers in Kerala, India. It originates in Cherikkulathur in the Western Ghats, at an elevation of 45 metres (148 ft) and is 22 km (13.7 mi) long. It is linked to the Chaliyar by a man-made canal on the south side of the small timber village of Kallayi lying on its banks. The Kallayi was known for its timber businesses, but now many of these have been closed down.

Its basin is located in the Kozhikode district.
