= Kallayi =

Kallai
- town
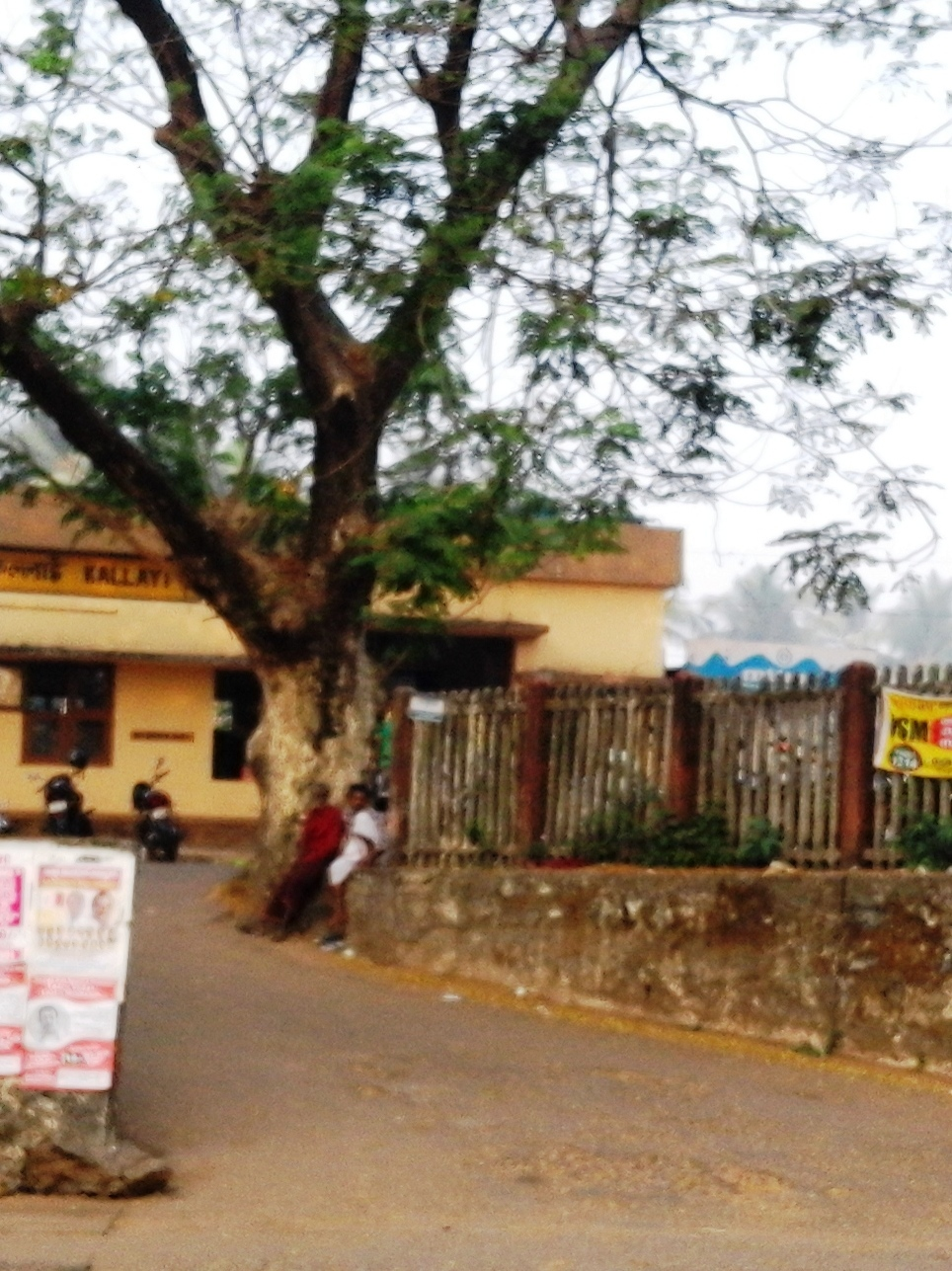
- Kallayi Railway Station
- Interactive map of Kallai
- Coordinates: 11°42′0″N 75°32′0″E
- Country: India
- State: Kerala
- District: Kozhikode

Languages
  - Official: Malayalam, English
- Time zone: UTC+5:30 (IST)
- Vehicle registration: KL-11

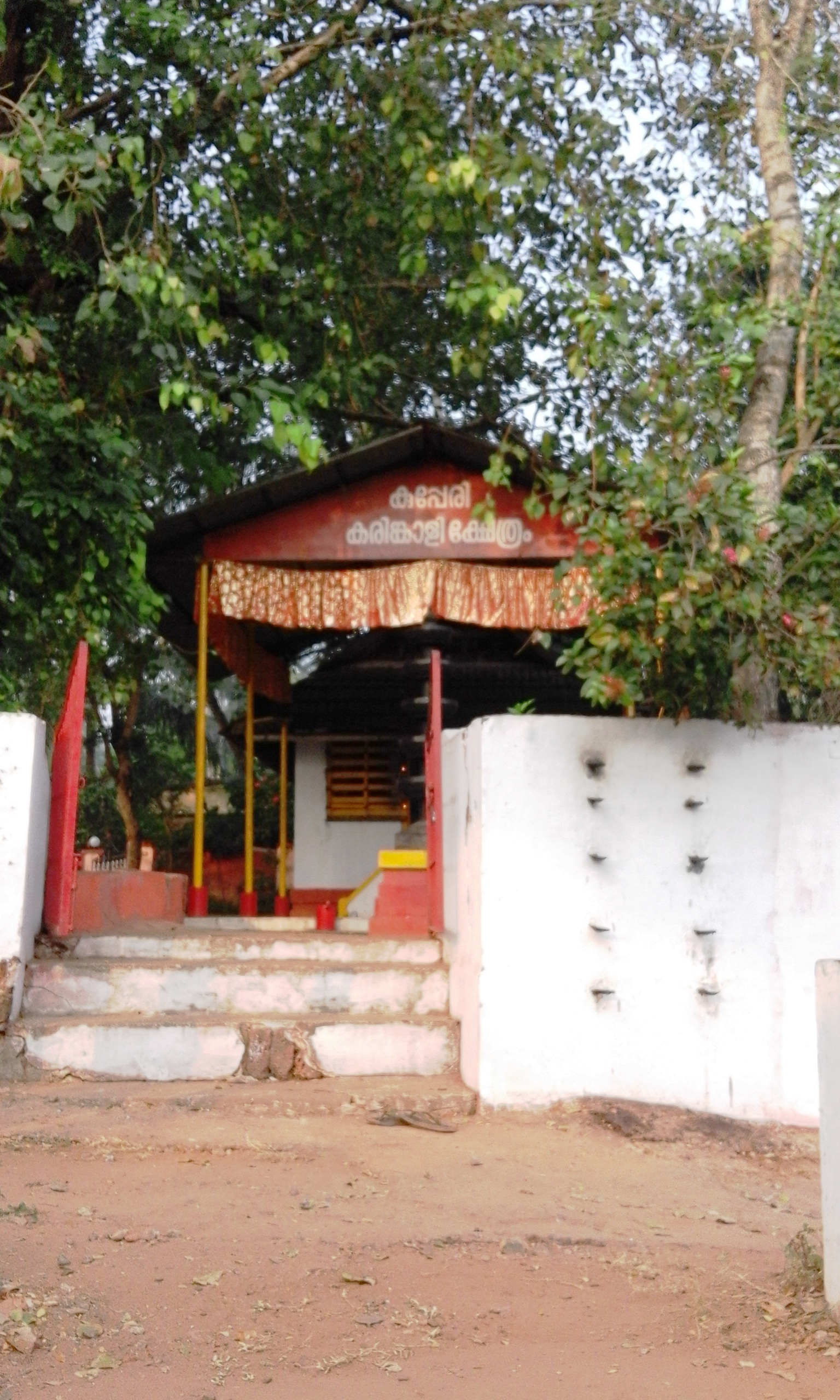
Kupperi Karinkali Bhagavathi Templenear Kallayi Railway Station

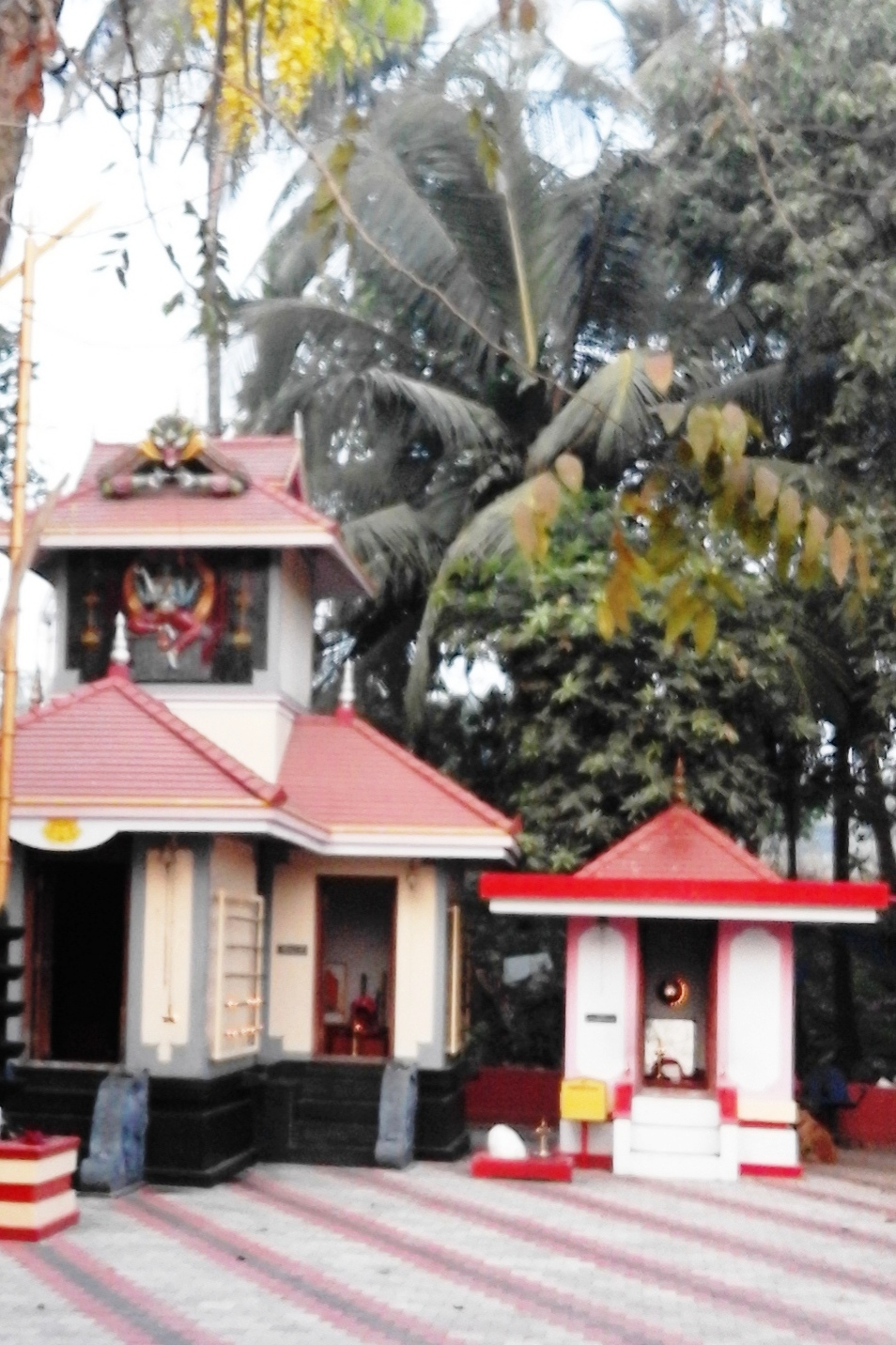
Kuttichathan Kavu, Premier Bus stop, Kallayi

Kallai (or Kallayi) is a suburb of Kozhikode on the banks of Kallai River which links with the Chaliyar river on the south by a man-made canal. It is in the Kozhikode district of Kerala in south India and is noted for timber trading.

During the late 19th century early 20th centuries, the Chaliyar River was extensively used as a waterway for carrying timber from the forest areas in and around Nilambur to the various mills in Kallai near Kozhikode (Calicut). Rafts made of logs were taken downstream during the monsoon season to Kallai, where these were sawn to size in the timber mills dotting the banks of the river.

During this period, Kallai was one of the most important centers in the world for the timber business. The place was noted for woods of superlative strength and durability like teak, rosewood etc. Towards the second half of the 20th century, the activity declined drastically as tree felling was banned or strictly controlled with a view to stop deforestation. Many mills still operate in Kallai, though with far less output. Many have now closed down.

Kallai Road starts from Palayam junction in the very heart of old Kozhikode. The first junction towards the south is Pushpa Junction which connects to Mankavu on the east and Kuttichira Beach on the west. The road continues to the south with landmarks like Paico Bookstall, Marzook College and the Kallayi Library. Panniyankara junction has a unique colonial building built in 1902 and called Princess of Wales Dispensary which is now converted into a homeopathy clinic. Panniyankara police station stands opposite to this clinic. Kannanchery, Nallalam and Areekkad are the next towns in the Kallayi Road. The SAIL-SCL steel factory and VKC Hawaii and the major industries in this area.

== Meenchantha ==
Meenchantha is a T-shaped junction near Kallai. It connects to Kozhikode City on the south and South Kerala on the southern side. The eastern diversion goes to Mankavu and Arayidathu-Palam junctions. The 'bypass road' to Mankavu and Arayidathupalam starts from Meenchantha. This road goes by Thiruvannoor, Mankavu Junction and Puthiyara before joining Mavoor Road at Arayidathupalam junction. The road going to the southeast connects to Malappuram and other cities of south Kerala. Small towns like Kolathara and Cheruvannur Nallalam are located here. The southern part of Meenchantha is heavily industrialized with many automobile giants like Toyoto and Indus maintaining mega showrooms and workshops there. The eastern diversion from Meenchantha is called The Bypass Road or the Meenchantha Bypass. It connects Meenchantha with little towns like Thiruvannoor, Mankavu and Puthiyara and finally reaches the eastern side of Kozhikode city at Arayidathu-palam.

== Vattakkinar Junction ==
650 metres to the west of Meenchantha junction lies the legendary Vattakkinar junction where the branch road to Beypore starts. 'Vattakkinar' means the round well in Malayalam. Kottiyott Shree Bhagawathi Temple and Meenchantha Juma Masjidh are located in Vattakkinar junction. YMRC Road to the west of Vattakkinar junction connects to the Payyanakkal beach. Vattakkinar is also famous for the Ramakrishna Mission where the renowned poet, Kunhunni lived all his life as a bachelor.

== Important Landmarks ==
- Vattampoyil town
- Salafi Masjid
- Pushpa Junction
- St. Patrick School
- Kurumba Bhagavathi Temple, Bunglavu
- Government Arts & Science College
- Fire and Rescue Center
- Ladder Kerala- Builders in Calicut
- National Child Development Council
- Kottakal Arya Vaidya Shala
- Jayalakshmi silks

== See also ==
- Timber rafting
- Kozhikode
- Chaliyar river
- Kallai river
