= Economy of Kochi =

Economy of a city in Kerala, India

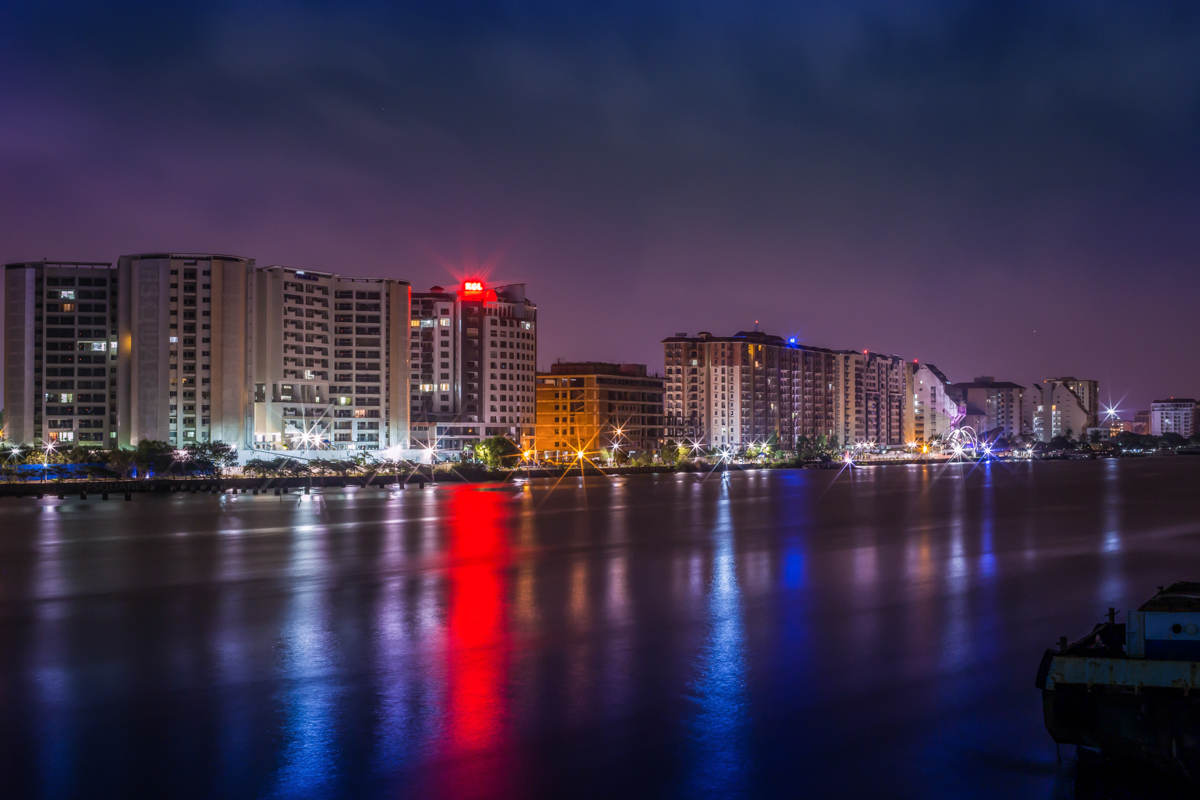
Marine Drive

Kochi is widely regarded as the financial and commercial capital of Kerala. The city and the district of Ernakulam district contributes the highest GDP to economy of the state of Kerala.

== Synopsis ==
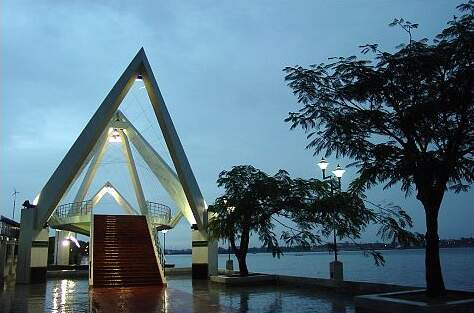
Contemporarily designed walkway and bridges at Marine Drive represents the modern face of Kochi.

The economy of Kochi can be classified as a business economy with emphasis on the service sector. Major business sectors include Real estate, manufacturing, shipbuilding, Port and Maritime, Food Processing, chemical industries, information technology (IT), Tourism, health services, and banking. The High Court of Kerala is situated in the city. Consequentially, legal services are a major contributor to the economy. To tap the potential of the natural harbour at Kochi further, a marina and an international container transshipment terminal have been built. The city used to house Kerala's stock exchange, the Cochin Stock Exchange. Federal Bank, the fourth largest Private-sector bank in India, is headquartered at Aluva. As in most of Kerala, inward remittances from abroad by Non Resident Indians (NRI) is a major source of income. In the 2009 rankings of ease to start and operate a business, Kochi was ranked sixteenth, above Kolkata Exports and allied activities are also important contributors to the city's economy. Tourism has of late, become a major contributor to the city's income. The Headquarters of the Southern Naval Command of the Indian Navy is situated at Venduruthy about 5 kilometers south of the city centre. The state government has given priority to the establishment of IT and BPO enterprises to exploit the opportunities that have arisen in the field.

== Major industries ==
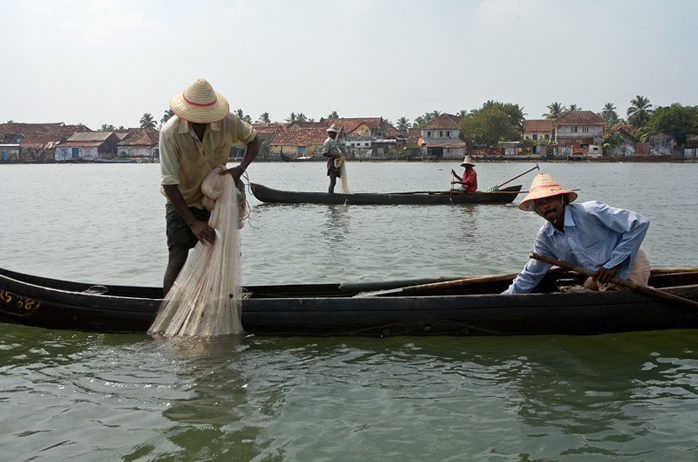
Fishermen fishing in traditional boats in the backwaters. Kochi is a major exporter of seafood.

=== Chemical industry ===
Eloor, situated 17 km north of the city, is an island of 11.21 km^{2} and is the largest industrial belt in Kerala. There are more than 247 industries viz. Fertilisers and Chemicals Travancore (FACT), Travancore Cochin Chemicals, Indian Rare Earths Limited, Hindustan Insecticides Limited, Carborundum Universal, PCBL Chemical and many others manufacturing a range of products like chemical-petrochemical products, pesticides, rare-earth elements, rubber processing chemicals, fertilizers, zinc/chromium compounds and leather products.

=== Ship building ===
The Cochin Shipyard in Kochi is one of the largest ship building facility in India. Cochin Shipyard was incorporated in the year 1972 as a fully owned Government of India company. In the last three decades the company has emerged as a forerunner in the Indian shipbuilding & Shiprepair industry. This yard can build and repair the largest vessels in India. It can build ships up to 1,100,000 tonnes deadweight (DWT) and repair ships up to 1,250,000 DWT. The yard has delivered two of India's largest double hull Aframax tankers each of 95,000 DWT. CSL has secured shipbuilding orders from internationally renowned companies from Europe & Middle East and is nominated to build the country's first indigenously built Air Defence Ship. The Cochin Shipyard also builds ships for the Indian Navy.

Shipyard commenced ship repair operations in the year 1982 and has undertaken repairs of all types of ships including upgradation of ships of oil exploration industry as well as periodical lay up repairs and life extension of ships of Navy, UTL, Coast Guard, Fisheries and Port Trust besides merchant ships of SCI & Oil and Natural Gas Corporation. The yard has, over the years, developed adequate capabilities to handle complex and sophisticated repair jobs. Recently Cochin Shipyard won a major repair orders from ONGC. The order for major repairs of three rigs viz Mobile Offshore Drilling Unit (MODU) Sagar Vijay, Mobile Offshore Drilling Unit (MODU) Sagar Bhushan and Jack Up Rig (JUR) Sagar Kiran was secured by CSL against very stiff international competition.

=== Oil refining ===
Kochi is home to the largest public sector refinery in India, BPCL Kochi Refinery. Formerly known as Cochin Refineries Ltd., the first unit came on stream in September 1966 with a capacity of 50,000 barrels per day. In 2006, Kochi Refinery was acquired by the Bharat Petroleum Corporation Limited, India's second-largest state-owned downstream oil producer. The refinery is situated at Ambalamugal, around 12 km (7.5 mi) east of the city centre. Today, the refinery has a crude oil refining capacity of 15.5 Million Metric Tonnes per Annum (MMTPA). For niche Petrochemical products, a Propylene Derivative Petrochemical Project was commissioned by the Hon’ble Prime Minister of India on 14 February 2021 and the commercial production of niche petrochemicals commenced from 14 April 2021.

=== Information technology ===
Kochi is one of the leading Tier-II destinations for IT and ITES companies in the country. The availability of 15 Gbit/s bandwidth, through undersea cables such as FLAG, SAFE and SEA ME WE 3 ensures seamless data flow, and lower operational costs compared to other major cities in India, has been to its advantage. InfoPark, promoted by the Government of Kerala, is the primary hub of IT/ITES companies in Kochi. Smart City Kochi, Muthoot Technopolis etc. are some of the other IT/technology parks housing numerous IT companies in the city. The established scene of information technology in Kochi is validated by the presence of national and international majors such as TCS, Wipro, IBM, Accenture, IQVIA, Cognizant, EY, KPMG, Baker Hughes, Deloitte, Xerox, Tech Mahindra, UST, Persistent Systems, KPIT Technologies. InfoPark alone houses 582 companies, employs over 72,000 people and contributed to over ₹11,400 crores ($1.31 Bn) in IT exports in 2023-2024 fiscal. It is estimated that the city employs over 120,000 people in the IT sector.

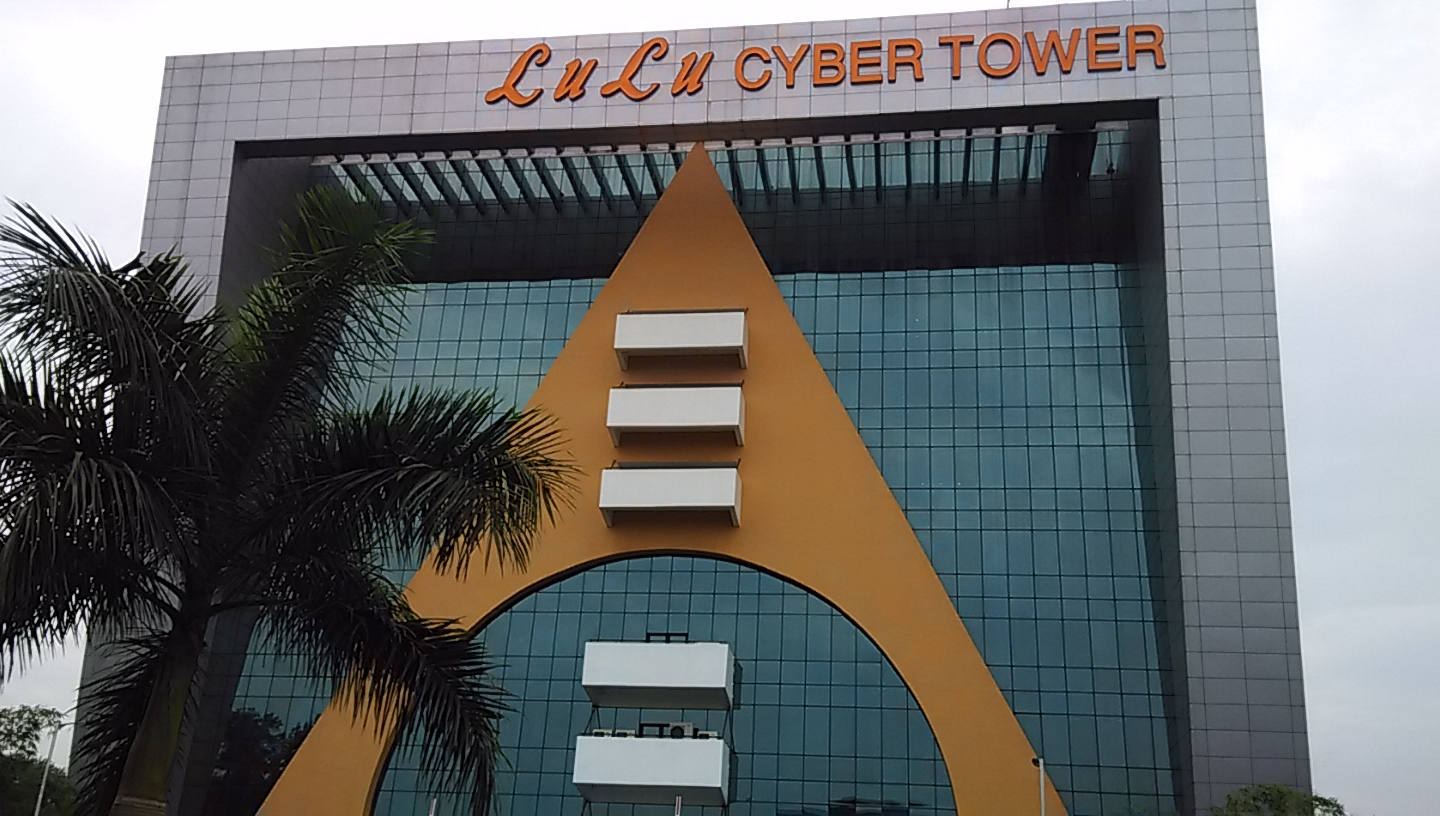
LuLu Cyber Tower 1

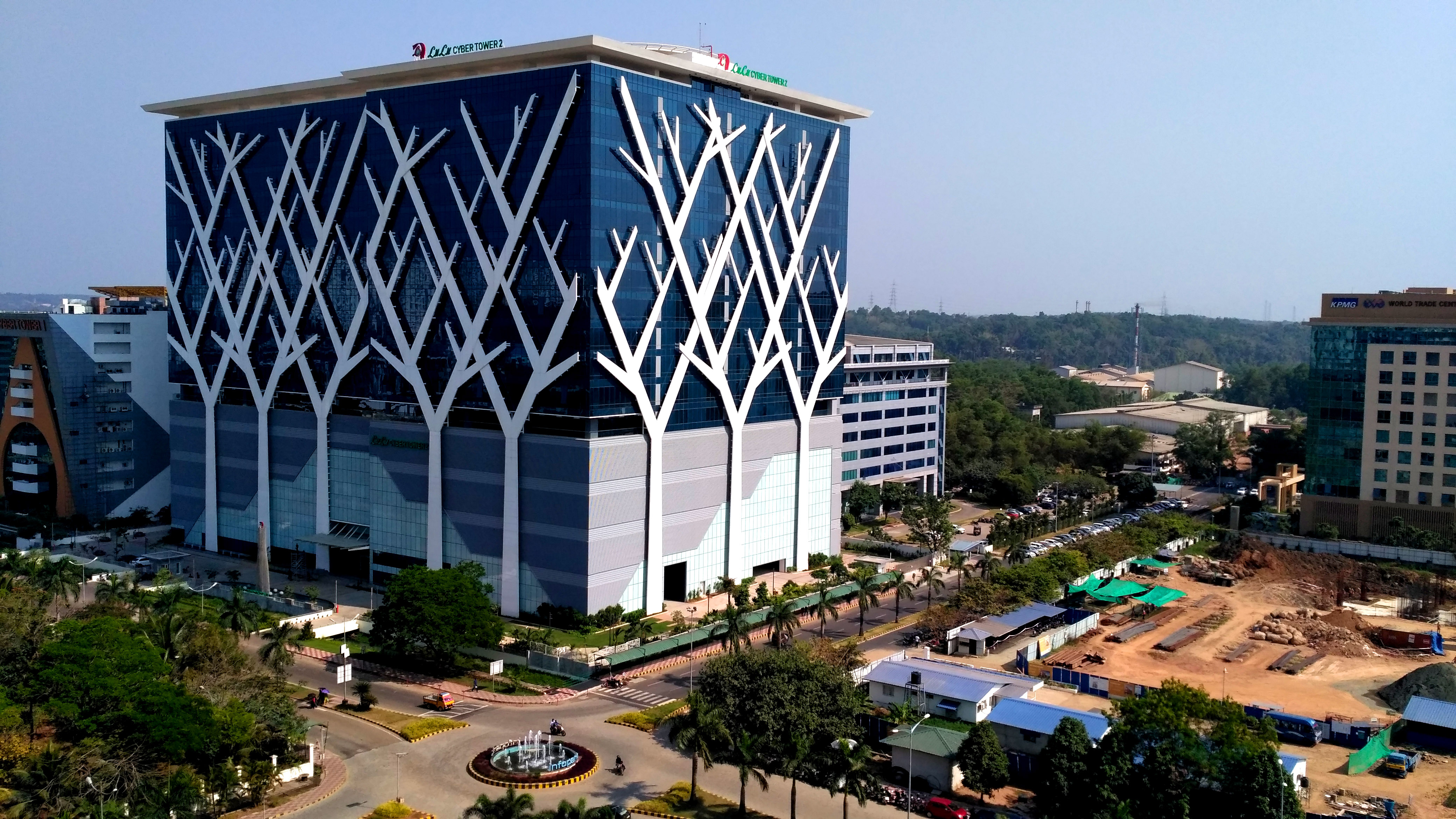
Lulu Cyber Tower 2

=== Electronics hardware ===
Kochi has a well-established electronics industry. Some of the home grown electrical & electronics companies include V-Guard Industries, FCI OEN Connectors and SFO Technologies, the largest manufacturer of photonics devices in India. The Government of Kerala has announced a project to build an industrial park named Electronic City spanning an area of 340 acres, to cater to the electronic hardware industries. The private operator NeST is building a Special Economic Zone specifically for electronics hardware spanning an area of 30 acres. Kochi also houses manufacturing plants of Amphenol, American major in fibre optics, Aptiv, one of the world's largest automotive technology suppliers and Belden Inc..

=== Medical Device ===
Kerala boasts over 70 medical device manufacturing units, indicating a robust industry presence. The state benefits from a highly skilled workforce, with over 20,000 engineering and technical graduates annually. The major medical equipment manufacturers based out of Kochi includes "Agappe Diagnostics", one of the leading Indian manufacturer of diagnostic reagents and equipment and "DentCare", one of the world's largest manufacturers of Dental prosthesis.

=== Food Processing ===
Kerala is a major hub of spices and accounts for 75% of spices exports from India and is a major producer of coconut, tea and cashew. In addition, Kerala is home to 75% of India’s EU-certified seafood units, hundreds of units primarily located in the Kochi-Aroor belt, making it a major exporter of high-quality seafood. Kochi is home to the International Pepper Exchange, where black pepper is globally traded. The Spices Board of India is also headquartered at Kochi. The Cochin fishing harbour, located at Thoppumpady is a major fishing port in the state and supplies fish to the local and export markets. Central Government establishments like the Coconut Development Board, the Coir Board, the Marine Products Export Development Authority (MPEDA) and the Spices Board are also located in the city. KUFOS (Kerala University of Fisheries and Ocean Studies) first university in India exclusively dedicated to studies in fisheries and allied disciplines is also located in the city.

Kochi is one of the major hubs in food technology in the country housing numerous companies in the sector. The city is home to Synthite Industries, world’s largest producer of spice extracts. The city also houses food processing units of global majors such as McCormick & Company, Orkla ASA, Olam International, MANE SA etc.

=== Retail ===
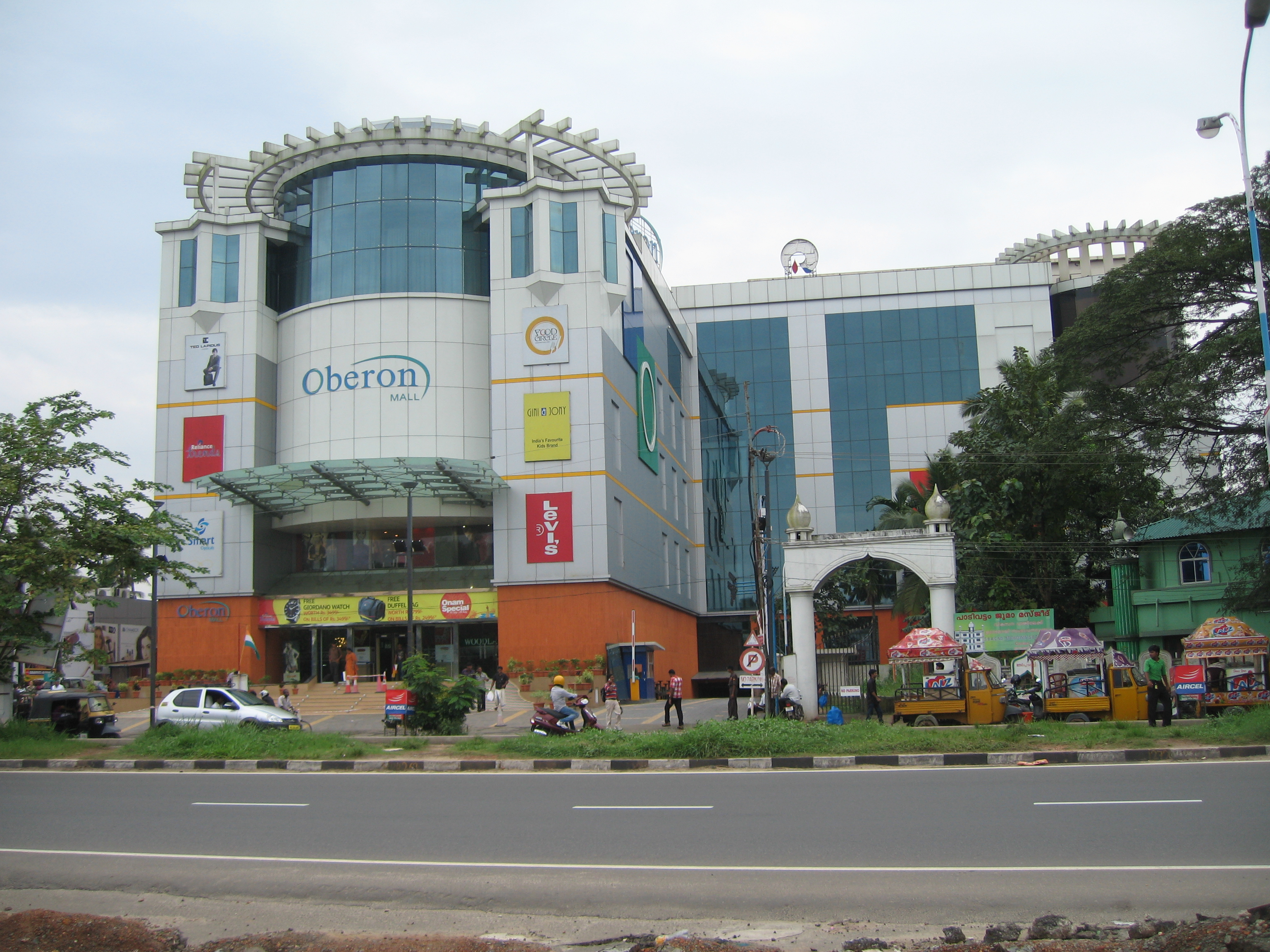
The Oberon Mall is the first full format shopping mall in the state of Kerala

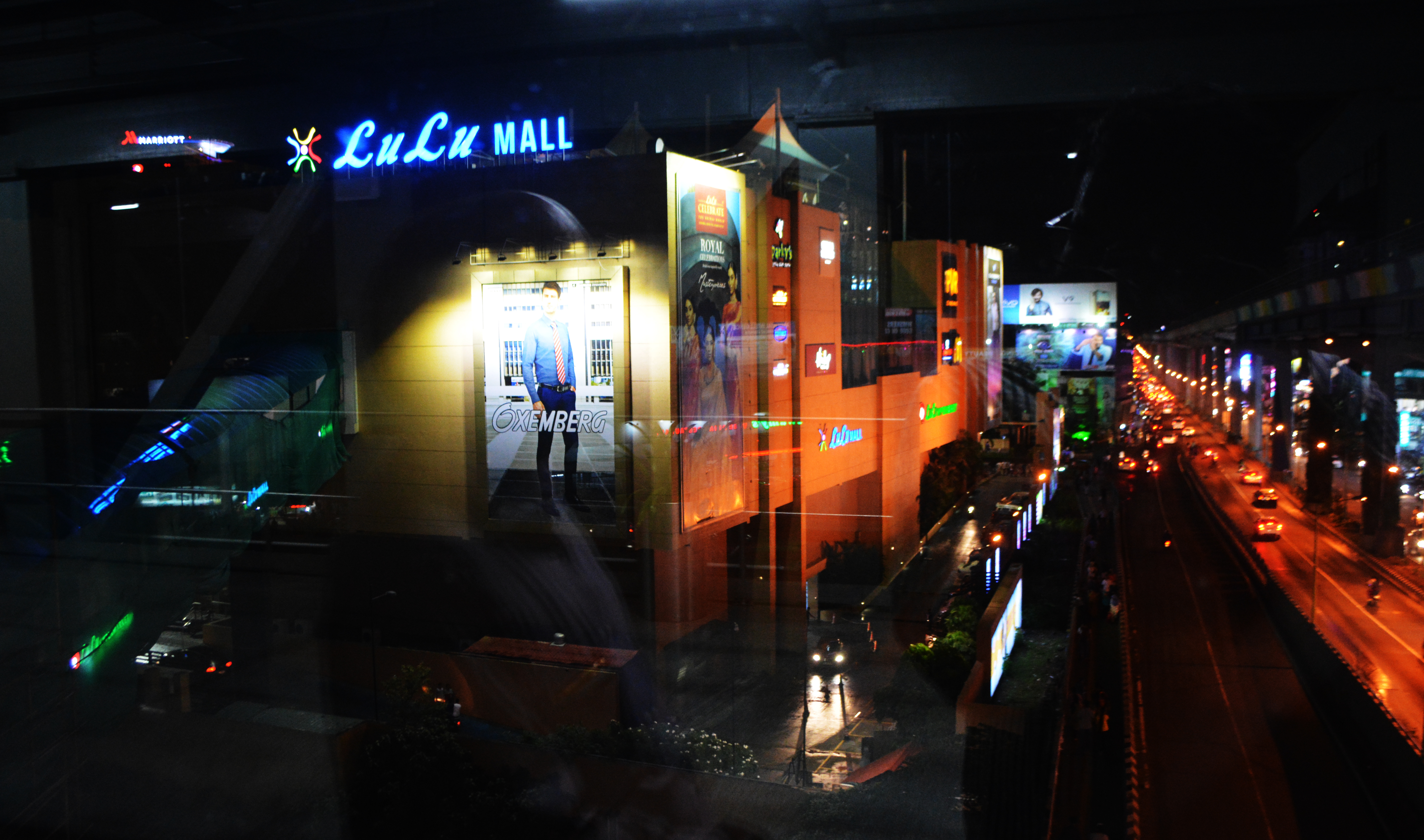
Lulu Mall view from Edapally Metro station at Kochi, Kerala, India

Kochi is the biggest centre for shopping in Kerala. The city houses stores of major national and international brands and retail chains across the city. The major retail ventures in Kochi are gold, textile, furniture, home accessories and home appliances. There are a number of textile stores that exceed 50,000 sq ft (4,600 m^{2}) of retail space..

Kochi houses the highest number of shopping malls in the state of Kerala. Oberon Mall is the first full format mall in the state. The Lulu Mall Kochi is one of largest shopping malls in India and is one of the most visited locations in the state. Other major shopping locations include Forum Mall Kochi, Centre Square Mall, Abad Nucleus Mall etc.

Malls in Kochi

- Lulu International Mall
- Centre Square Mall
- Oberon Mall
- Gold Souq Grande
- Nucleus Mall
- Grand Mall
- Bay Pride Mall
- Forum Mall Kochi
- Q1 Mall

=== Plywood ===
Perumbavoor is a major town in the Kochi metropolitan area. Spread over several panchayats like Rayamangalam, Vazhakulam, Asamannoor, Vengola, Kottappady, Koovappady and many other places in the Perumbavoor municipality, the town is famous for Asia's Largest plywood industries. The plywood sector employs about two lakh people directly and about three and a half lakh indirectly in a sector with over 1,400 units. This industry includes units that manufacture not only plywood but also veneer and sawn or bandsaw. All the units operate within a radius of 15 km (9.3 mi). The industry has started growing here over the past two decades. Initially, there were only 10 companies. But later, as more people entered the sector and set up more units, the business picked up. The industry witnessed a major change when rubber wood became available in abundance due to fluctuations in rubber prices. The plywood is also imported from foreign countries like Vietnam, Laos and China. some more Eucalyptus timber is also imported from countries like Brazil. There is no market for plywood in Kerala. Places like Maharashtra, Karnataka, Tamil Nadu and parts of North India are the biggest markets for plywood. This industry is now the backbone of Perumbavoor's economic potential. Another unique feature of the industry is that 90 percent of the workers in the units are migrants. The crisis that hit the construction industry during the period from 2003 to 2004 led to a large influx of migrant workers into the plywood industry.

== Special economic zones ==
There are four special economic zones (SEZs) in the city, Cochin Special Economic Zone, InfoPark and SmartCity in Kakkanad, and Puthuvype in Vypin. Electronic City is a proposed SEZ for electronic hardware manufacturing to be built in Kalamassery by NeST Infratech.

== Governmental institutions ==
Union Government establishments like the Coconut Development Board, the Coir Board and the Marine Products Export Development Authority (MPEDA) have head offices located in the city.

Kochi is the seat of the High Court of Kerala, the highest court of Kerala and the Lakshadweep.

== History ==
=== Prehistoric to Chera period ===
Cochin was preceded by the Vempalinad fiefdom, which was part of the Kulasekhara empire.

=== Independent period ===
Cochin became independent of the Kulasekhara empire in 1102 AD. It gained prominence as a trading port after the destruction of Muziris in 1341. It attracted Arab, Chinese and European maritime traders. Chinese fishing nets have been in use by the Cochinite fishing industry since 1350.

=== Portuguese period ===
Portuguese traders built a factory in Cochin after obtaining permission from the Cochinite government in 1500. In return for defending Cochin against invasion by Calicut in 1503, Portugal was permitted to establish a military base in Cochin, and built Fort Emmanuel at the site of what is now Fort Kochi. Cochin became the capital of the newly formed Portuguese India, and the kingdom became a puppet state of Portugal.

=== Dutch period ===
In 1662, the Dutch Republic launched an invasion of Cochin during a succession crisis, and completed it by February 1663. The Cochinite king, Rama Varma II (1658–1662) of the Tanur branch, was killed in battle, his successor Goda Varma was deposed, and the Dutch-backed pretender, Vīra Kērala Varma V of the Mutha Tavazhi branch, was installed as the new Raja of Cochin. The Portuguese traders and colonists were expelled from Cochin. On 20 March 1663, Dutch East India Company and the Raja of Cochin signed a treaty under which the company had a monopoly on purchasing on pepper and cinnamon produced in the kingdom. Another treaty in the following year exempted the company from the payment of import taxes. Further treaties eroded the power of the government and turned the kingdom into a puppet state of the company. Bolgatty Palace was built by Dutch traders after the Dutch conquest of Cochin.

=== Mysorean period ===
After the Mysorean invasion of Cochin, the government of Cochin had to pay a one-off tribute of 1 lakh Ikkeri pagodas, and an annual tribute of 30,000 pagodas and four elephants to Mysore.

=== British period ===
Trade in at port increased substantially after the British Empire took control of Cochin. To develop Cochin port, Robert Bristow was brought to Cochin in 1920 by Lord Willingdon, Governor of Madras.

=== Present period ===
In the early 2000s, the city witnessed heavy investment, and experienced a GDP growth rate of 8.3%.

== See also ==
- Marine Drive, Kochi
