= Chitrapuzha River =

River in Kerala

Chitrapuzha River is a tidal tributary of the Periyar River. It is flowing through the Ernakulam district of Kerala.

It is passing through areas of Irumpanam, Tripunithura, and Kakkanad of Ernakulam district.

== Overview ==
It runs between industrial hubs like Udyogamandal and Ambalamugal.

The river has about 16 small perennial streams and also 9 canals. It receives water flows from upstream areas of Kadambrayar via Brahmapuram.

== Controversies ==
The river faces severe stress from heavy industrial and domestic effluent discharges by nearby establishments (such as BPCL Kochi Refinery, FACT, and HOCL).

Studies on the water quality index of Chitrapuzha River indicate that the water is largely unfit for drinking or irrigation due to heavy metal accumulation, low dissolved oxygen, and high biochemical oxygen demand (BOD).

Periodic spikes in faecal coliform bacteria (exceeding Central Pollution Control Board bathing limits) and recurring instances of fish kills from industrial sewage discharges have prompted local action councils and residents to demand urgent river rejuvenation.
