= Cochin Refineries Limited Ground =

Multi purpose stadium in Ambalamugal, Kochi, Kerala, India

Coordinates: 11°39′53.75″N 76°11′25.18″E

- CRL Ground
- Interactive map of Cochin Refineries Limited Ground
- Full name: Cochin Refineries Limited Ground
- Location: Ambalamugal, Kochi, Kerala, India
- Owner: Cochin Refineries Limited
- Operator: Cochin Refineries Limited
- Capacity: 3,000

Construction
- Groundbreaking: 1992
- Opened: 1992

Website
- ESPNcricinfo

Cochin Refineries Limited Ground or CRL Ground is a multi-purpose stadium in Ambalamugal, Kochi, Kerala, India. The ground is mainly used for organizing matches of football, cricket and other sports. The ground is owned and managed by Cochin Refineries Limited. The ground has a capacity of 3,000 and School End, Fact End are two ends of the ground.

The stadium has hosted a Ranji Trophy match in November 1992 when Kerala cricket team played against Goa cricket team until 1989 but since then the stadium has hosted non-first-class matches.
