= Cyber City Kochi =

Proposed Special Economic Zone near Kochi, India

Coordinates: 10.049°N 76.350°E

Cyber City
- Type: Private sector
- Industry: Information technology business park
- Genre: Special Economic Zone
- Founded: 17 February 2011
- Headquarters: Kochi, India
- Owner: Adani Group

Cyber City, Kochi, also known as Adani Cyber City, was a proposed Special Economic Zone information technology park in the city of Kochi, Kerala, India. It was promoted by Adani Group and is located near HMT at Kalamassery. The SEZ was to be built over a land area of 70 acres (28.3 ha). Construction was expected to start on 17 February 2011, and the first phase was scheduled to be within two years. The current status of the project is uncertain as the work never commenced as planned.

According to the rules governing a Special economic zone, 70% of the built-up area would be processing area for IT and ITES business, primarily for export. The remaining 30 per cent is categorised as a non-processing zone and will feature shopping malls, convention centres, apartment complexes and other lifestyle needs, developing it into a full-fledged township.

The first phase consists of a built-up space of 1,000,000 sq ft (92,900 m^{2}), to be built in two years. Once completed, it would house a built-up space of 10,000,000 sq ft (929,000 m^{2}).

== Location & Connectivity ==
The planned township is on 70 acres of land bought from HMT Limited. It is located 17 km from the city centre and 22 km from Cochin International Airport, among an area where a number of other similar developments are being planned. the distance to NH 47 is 5 km.

The VSNL’s communication gateway is located less than 7 km from the park. This gateway handles around 70% of the country’s data traffic. The proximity to the SAFE and SEA-ME-WE 3 cables dropping zone and direct optical fibre link to the gigabyte router of VSNL, enables the park to offer 100% uptime data connectivity to units. Kochi offers Pacific and Atlantic route of connectivity to the US.

== Infrastructure ==
70% of the built up area of the township will be used for IT and ITES industries. The remaining 30% will be non processing area, used for residential, commercial and entertainment purposes.

== See also ==
- Economy of Kochi
- Smart City
- Infopark, Kochi
- Electronics City, Kochi
- Cyber City Gurgaon
