= Assault on T. J. Joseph =

2010 assault in Kerala, India

2010 assault in Kerala
- Location: Muvattupuzha, Kerala
- Date: 4 July 2010; 08:30 IST (UTC+05:30)
- Attack type: Religious violence, Islamist terrorism
- Injuries: 3
- Perpetrator: Popular Front of India

The assault on T. J. Joseph occurred on 4 July 2010. T. J. Joseph, a professor of Malayalam at Newman College, Thodupuzha, a Christian minority institution affiliated with Mahatma Gandhi University had his wrist disarticulated on allegation of blasphemy, by members of Popular Front of India, an Islamic organisation in India. The then Minister of Home Affairs of Kerala, Kodiyeri Balakrishnan, made a statement that while the government was aware that a local Dar-ul Khada set up by All India Muslim Personal Law Board was operating to resolve civil disputes, no complaints had been received that it was passing "Taliban-style" orders.

== Background ==
T. J. Joseph, a professor of Malayalam language at Newman College, Thodupuzha, set a question in the Malayalam internal examination paper for second-year BCom students in March 2010. In the examination, question number 11 asked students to punctuate a dialogue between a character and God, given below:

Original text in Malayalam question paper

മുഹമ്മദ്:	പടച്ചോനേ പടച്ചോനേ
ദൈവം:	എന്താടാ നായിൻ്റെ മോനേ
മുഹമ്മദ്:	ഒരു അയില അതു മുറിച്ചാൽ എത്ര കഷണമാണ്
ദൈവം:	മൂന്നു കഷണമാണെന്ന് എത്ര തവണ പറഞ്ഞിട്ടുണ്ടെടാ നായേ

ISO 15919 transliteration

Muhammadŭ:	paţaccōnē paţaccōnē
daivaṃ:	ěntāţā nāyiṉṯě mōnē
Muhammadŭ:	ǒru ayila atu muṛiccāˤ ětra kaṣaṇamāṇŭ
daivaṃ:	mūnnu kaṣaṇamāṇěnnŭ ětra tavaṇa paṛaññiţţuṇţěţā nāyē

English translation

Muhammed:	O god O god
God:	What do you want son of a dog
Muhammed:	If I slice a mackerel how many pieces will there be
God:	How many times have I told you it will be three pieces you dog

The passage was adapted from a lecture by Malayalam film director P. T. Kunju Muhammed that was in his book, Thirakathayude Reethisasthram (Methodology of Screenplay), published by Kerala State Institute of Languages. In the original text, Kunju Muhammed explains a scene in his 1999 film Garshom, in which the character Nasarudheen, an NRI who has returned to India, is madly talking to himself. Kunju Muhammed based the character Nasarudheen on a person with schizophrenia he had met near the road who was talking to God.

T.J. Joseph named the character 'Muhammed' in the question paper, which was a reference to the author P.T. Kunju Muhammed, but it also made the text open to misinterpretation as a dialogue between God and the Islamic Prophet Muhammad.

The local edition of the Madhyamam newspaper reported the incident, sparking off the controversy alleging blasphemy. Several Muslim organisations protested the alleged defamation of Muhammed. The Campus Front, the Popular Front of India's student wing, launched an agitation against the professor. Student groups affiliated to the Indian National Congress and the Indian Union Muslim League also marched towards the college in protest. Copies of the question paper were circulated in sensitive areas by various Muslim organisations.

An all-party meeting called by the District Collector decided to recommend action against the professor responsible for incorporating the question that reportedly hurt the religious sentiments of the community.

The state police registered a case under Section 295 of the Indian Penal Code (for causing communal hatred) against the professor who subsequently absconded. The police then issued a lookout notice for him and arrested him a week later. He was then released on bail in April. The Newman College authorities also suspended him from the college and apologised for the mistake. His son was taken to hospital after being beaten up in police custody.

== Attack ==
On 4 July 2010, a group of eight people in a Maruti Omni waylaid the professor near his home at Muvattupuzha. According to Joseph's sister, Stella Joseph, around eight people armed with swords and knives came in a van and waylaid their vehicle. They pulled out the lecturer after smashing the windscreen. They then chopped off his right hand and stabbed him in the left thigh. When they tried to stop the assault, she and her mother were attacked by the assailants who then detonated bombs and fled the scene. According to police, the attack was carried out by an eight-member team consisting of Savad of Asamannoor, Pareeth of North Vazhakkulam, Shobin of Kothamangalam, Nazar of Aluva, Shajil of Muvattupuzha, Shamsuddin of Perumbavoor, Shanvas and Jamal.

== Aftermath ==
A neighbour rushed Joseph to Nirmala Hospital where first aid was administered, while the severed hand was collected and packed in ice. Joseph was taken to the Specialists Hospital in Kochi where he underwent an operation that lasted 16 hours.

Joseph gave a media interview from his hospital bed, where he stated that he had used an extract from a university-approved book on the Malayalam language, and that his opponents did not give him an opportunity to explain the situation. He said that the naming of the village madcap as Muhammad had been done as a tribute to the original author, P. T. Kunju Muhammed. Joseph's family made a statement that they forgive the attackers.

On 24 July 2010, his suspension from the college was revoked by the Mahatma Gandhi University which described the issue as an "unintentional error". The attack on the teacher and his financial conditions were also considered.

On 4 September 2010, the management of college terminated Professor Joseph from service with effect from September for hurting the religious sentiments of a community. Joseph, who expressed grief over the management decision, calling it unexpected. He said that the management had given the highest punishment to him and his family. Terming the action of the management as irrational, pro-Left writers, cultural forums and teachers unions came in support of the Joseph.

PFI leader Anas won the Vanchinad division of Vazhakkulam block in Ernakulam district in the civic body elections, while he was in judicial custody and lodged in the Viyyur central jail in connection with the case.

On 19 March 2014, Joseph's wife Salomi (48) was found dead, having hanged herself at her residence. She had resorted to the extreme measure due to mental pressure over her husband not having been reinstated by the college. The family had been failing to make both ends meet with no regular income for a lengthy period of time.

== Investigation ==
The state police arrested two activists of the Popular Front of India, Asharaf and Jaffer, on the same day Joseph was attacked. According to the police, Asharaf had been privy to the entire operation, and had arranged the vehicle used by the assailants. The vehicle was then reportedly handed over to Jaffer for dismantling.

On the night of 4 July, Aluva ASP J. Jayanath conducted a raid at the house of Mansoor, Eranakulam District Secretary of the Popular Front of India at Kunnathery, Aluva and seized documents and CDs which revealed the connection of PFI activists with the attack. The State police was criticised when some of the officers of Ernakulam range made a deal with the Popular Front of India for ending investigation in the case. The move was reported to be thwarted by the involvement of state internal affairs minister. According to DGP Jacob Punnoose a new investigation team under Thrissur Crime Branch SP P.N. Unniraja was made in charge of investigation Punnoose also informed that the crime was well-organised with pumping in money.

The Kerala State Police on 9 July 2010 issued 'look out notices' for three accused who absconded after the attack.

On 8 July 2010, a team led by Aluva ASP J Jayanath unearthed a gun from the house of Ayoob, a leader of the Popular Front of India.

The state police also raided the houses and offices of Popular Front of India and its political arm Social Democratic Party of India (SDPI) at Muvattupuzha, Kothamangalam Perumbavoor, Chalakudy, Thrishur, Angamaly, Aluva, Cochin and Ernakulam.

The Kerala state police seized explosives, country-made bombs, weapons and incriminating materials. A CD linked to al-Qaeda has also been seized from a PFI activist Kunjumon. The police eventually booked him under anti-terrorism laws. It is reported to be a propaganda CD with brutal killing and torture of westerners. According to Police, the CDs have been in used condition and were used to train PFI activists to commit the crime. It also showed that the organisation had contact with international bodies. The CDs have been reported to be brought from either Afghanistan, Pakistan or the Gulf countries.

Judicial First Class Magistrate Court, Muvattupuza, declared the absconding Popular Front of India leaders, K K Ali and Nazar as proclaimed offenders.

A dentist, an active PFI worker, had been arrested on charges of sedition. Dr Raneef, a native of Aluva near Kochi, had given first aid to one of the assailants who was injured during the attack. Two books that speak against democracy have been recovered from the doctor, who had been associated with extremist activities since 2002. Copies of one of the seized books, Islam and Democracy, had been recovered from a Students Islamic Movement of India (SIMI) camp held in 2006 at Aluva.

On 21 July 2010, the Kerala police arrested the Popular Front of India leader, who was suspected to be one of the conspirators behind the attack on the professor. Yunus, 33, a divisional leader of the PFI, was arraigned as the fourth accused in the case.

Based on the confessions of Yunus, cases of conspiracy have been registered against Shiyas, divisional secretary of PFI's Nellimattam unit in Ernakulam district and Mohammed Ali of Muvattupuzha, while a case has been registered against Latheef of Aluva and MoideenKutty of Valancherry in Malappuram district for harbouring some of the accused involved in the attack on Joseph.

On 13 August 2010, The Aluva police led by ASP J. Jayanath arrested six activists of the Popular Front of India while they were holding a meeting and attempting to distribute propaganda booklets. 320 copies of the book "Asavarnarkku Nallathu Islam", which contained material tarnishing Hindu and Christian religions, were seized from the hall where the meeting was being held.

On 15 August, police arrested Niyaz against whom a lookout notice had been issued in the case relating to the attack as he was travelling in a train from Tamil Nadu to Kerala. He was arrested when the train reached Shoranur. Niyas reportedly owned the Lancer car recovered by Aluva police from Kunjunnikkara on 29 July.

On 17 August, a police team led by Debesh Kumar Behera, ACP (South) raided Nanma books in Court Road, Kozhikode and a huge cache of books and compact discs containing incriminating and anti-national content were seized at the publishing firm.

P Abdul Hameed, Kerala state general secretary of the Popular Front of India, was questioned by the Special Investigation Team probing the hand-chopping case in Ernakulam on 17 August. Earlier on 16 August, Prof P Koya, chief editor of Thejas daily and member of PFI supreme council, was questioned at the Aluva police club by the SIT.

On 19 August Special Investigation Team (SIT) officials questioned Nazeruddin Elamaram, President of the Popular Front of India at Muvattupuzha.

Shamsuddin, one of the attackers in the team, who hails from Perumbavoor was arrested from Palakkad by the police on 20 August. Based on the information provided by him police arrested Jamal from the Beemapally area in Thiruvananthapuram on 28 August. Announcing Jamal's arrest, SP P N Unnirajan, heading the SIT informed the newsmen that the trial of the case would be conducted in the special court in Ernakulam where the NIA cases were also handled.

On 26 August the National Investigation Agency (NIA) informed the Kerala High Court that they are not planning to investigate the case as charges framed by the police does not cover anti-national terrorist activities. On the same day SIT questioned M Usman, managing director of Thejas daily.

KK Ali, who purchased the van which was used by the attackers, from Lawrance of Thrissur, two weeks prior to the attack was arrested by SIT from Pollachi on 30 August.

Police arrested Shobin, a B-Tech graduate of Kothamangalam, and Shanavaz alias Shemy of Valluvalli near North Paravur, from the Coimbatore railway station on 6 September.

On 6 September 2010, the Kerala Government informed the state high court that investigators found no evidence of a connection between the Popular Front of India with Hizbul Mujahideen, Lashkar-e Taiba (Let) or al-Qaeda.

On 8 September the Kerala High Court dismissed the bail applications of seven activists of Popular Front of India- Siyad, Sikander, Kamarudeen, Abdul Lateef, Moideen Kutty, Shiyas and Mohammed Ali. Turning down their bail pleas, Justice V Ramkumar said the objective of the activity was to disturb harmony and tranquility of the society and to create fear. It would be held to be a terror activity.

On 15 September the Kerala government transferred four cases registered against PFI activists to the Internal Security Investigation Team (ISIT) which probes terrorism-related incidents.

On 17 September the Kerala High Court gave bail to Dr. Raneef. The complaint of Dr Raneef that the police conducted a raid at his residence and hospital to come out with allegedly incriminating CDs, leaflets etc. as he refused to oblige the Aluva ASP J. Jayanath to become an approver by confessing that he was a conspirator in the hand chopping case, was accepted by the court while considering his bail application.

On 7 October police arrested Pareeth of Vazhakkulam, who was directly involved in the attack from Mangalore in Karnataka. Some reports suggest that Pareeth, who was hiding in Mumbai actually surrendered before the police in a deal with PFI.

On 3 January 2011 the Ernakulam Additional Sessions Court Judge V Shersy granted bail for the two main accused. Prime accused Jaffar (29) and second accused Ashraf (37) were granted bail on strict conditions. On the same day the Supreme Court bench comprising Js Markandey Katju and Dhyansudha Misra upheld the bail granted to Dr Raneef (ninth accused) by the Kerala High Court.

On 14 January police filed a charge sheet against 27 activists of the PFI accusing them of attempt to murder and other offences like IPC Sections 201 (causing disappearance of evidence), 202 (intentional omission to give information of offence), 212 (harbouring offender), 143 (unlawful assembly), 148 (rioting armed with deadly weapon), 120(B) (Criminal conspiracy) and 323 (causing hurt).

On 10 January 2024, after 13 years of absconding, one of the main accused Savad was arrested from a rented house in Kannur. He was produced before the NIA Special Court in Kochi on 11 January 2024.

== Response ==
The Kerala State Assembly raised its voice in unison to strongly condemn the hacking of T. J. Joseph, by fundamentalist elements on the following day.

Various Muslim organisations including the Indian Union Muslim League (IUML) condemned the attacks as "against the tenets of Islam". A rally under the banner of Muslim Aiykyavedi (Muslim United Front) was organised the next day in Muvattupuzha and Perumbavoor. They also blocked the local police station at Perumbavoor demanding the release of arrested Popular Front of India leaders. The protest though was dismissed by other Muslim organisations as a ploy by the Popular Front of India and challenged it to name any other organisation involved in the protest. A meeting of all the major Muslim organisations in Kerala proclaimed that the hand chopping incident has been a shame to the Muslim community in Kerala. They have also decided to isolate radical outfit like Popular Front of India.

The Kothamangalam diocese demanded National Investigation Agency inquiry into the entire incident. The Bishop of Kothamangalam diocese, Mar George Punnakottil issued pastoral letters condemning the attack on Professor and demanding nabbing of culprits. The pastoral letter also defended the dismissal of the professor from the college. Prayer meetings and silent protest marches were also organised in various churches and locations. Christian organisations like Global Council of Indian Christians and Catholic Bishops' Conference of India (CBCI) condemned the act and demanded that the attackers be brought to justice soon and be exemplarily punished. The Newman fraternity made a public appeal to extend a helping hand to Prof. T. J. Joseph. However, the Catholic authorities of the college dismissed him from the job and defend their action.

The Bharatiya Janata Party set up a four-member panel headed by Mr Harin Pathak (senior Supreme Court lawyer), Pinky Anand, Wilfred Misquita (Goa BJP vice-president) Advocate Balasubramanium Kamarasu. The Committee met with the members of family of Prof. Joseph to get a first-hand report on the sequence of events during the attack. They demanded a probe by the National Investigation Agency (NIA) into the incident. Mr Harin Pathak alleged that the Kerala Government had failed miserably in combating terror and the State was becoming a breeding ground for terrorist activities. Pathak also demanded that outfits like the NDF and Popular Front of India should be banned and the State Government produce a white paper on the investigation into terror activities in the state. He also noted that his party would highlight the gruesome attack on Prof. Joseph in the upcoming session of the Indian Parliament.

== Media ==
The Hindu in its editorial said "Freedom of expression has increasingly come under attack from religious fanatics in democratic and secular India and it is the duty of society and the political system to intervene more effectively to defend those who are targeted even if they express unpopular views". The Hindu also noted in its editorial that "The act of a gang that cut off the hand of a college teacher, by wielding an axe on a thoroughfare in Kerala in broad daylight, had Talibanism writ all over it. This act of barbarism, however, points to the rise of bloodthirst driven by religious fundamentalism that certain fringe elements may be seeking to impose on the State. That it was a planned operation carried out with brutal intent adds to the shock.".

Littérateur M.N. Karasseri, himself a retired professor and someone who keeps tabs on Muslim politics, noted in an Outlook article, "The Muslim youth today are looking for idealism and adventure. They are being misguided by the proponents of Maududism that espouses a do-or-die battle for ensuring hukumathe ilahi (the rule of Allah). The SDPI (Socialist Democratic Party of India), Jamaat (Jamaat e Islami Hind) and several other outfits subscribe to this philosophy. If the rest of society does not realise the inherent danger, more Taliban-model reprisals will follow".

Progressive Muslim writer Hameed Chennamangaloor says in an article in The Economic Times, "the circumstances are ideal for fanatics to convince their community members here that the problems their community faces in Iraq or Afghanistan are their own problems. The fact is that the problems of even the Muslims in Kerala are quite different from their community members in northern states. Some of these groups have more funds than even mainline political parties like the Congress or the CPM, and can hire any number of hands".

Speaking of the extremists, at a press conference in Delhi, Kerala Chief Minister V.S. Achuthanandan controversially said: "They want to turn Kerala into a Muslim-majority state in 20 years. They are using money and other inducements to convert people to Islam. They even marry women from outside their community in order to increase the Muslim population."

Syed Hyderali Shihab Thangal, president, Muslim League said that the extremists have done considerable damage to the community and that they have to be isolated.

== Book ==
Autobiography of Prof. T J Joseph titled Attupokatha Ormakal was published by DC Books in January 2020

== Court decision ==
=== Acquittal of Joseph ===
On 15 November 2013 Joseph was acquitted of all charges by a court in Kerala.

=== Conviction of attackers ===
In July 2013, criminal charges were brought against 37 people, of which 31 subsequently underwent trial in a special National Investigation Agency court, with the remaining 6 absconding.

On 8 May 2015, the court convicted 13 of the defendants, all activists of PFI, 10 of whom were sentenced to 8 years in jail, and 3 of whom were sentenced to 2 years in jail. A fine of ₹ 8 lakh was imposed on the convicted, to be paid to Joseph as compensation. The court acquitted the remaining 18 defendants due to insufficient evidence.
