= Kerala Books and Publications Society =

- Abbreviation: KBPS
- Formation: August 1978
- Purpose: Printing the textbooks of SCERT syllabus
- Headquarters: Kakkanad, Kochi
- Location: Kerala
- Official language: Malayalam
- Website: https://www.kbps.kerala.gov.in/

The Kerala Books and Publications Society is a society owned by the Government of Kerala headquartered at Kakkanad, Kochi. It is registered under the Travancore - Cochin Literary, Scientific and Charitable Society registration Act, 1955. It was established for printing the entire textbooks of SCERT syllabus required by the school children in the state and is functioning on a no loss no profit basis.

== Overview ==
The Society started commercial production in August 1978. The Society is also carrying out the printing of various Government Department & Universities and lottery tickets.

The Society's Press at Kakkanad was established in 3.97 hectares of land at Kakkanad near Civil Station. It is the biggest multicolour offset printing unit in Government Sector with a Harris M-300 High Speed Multicolor Web offset printing machine, four Web Offset colour Printing Machines, four Sheet fed Offset Printing Machines, three HMT Letterpress machines and a Label Printing Machine. It also has a Muller Martini Saddle stitcher imported from Switzerland.
