= Choice Paradise, Kochi =

Residential skyscraper in Kerala, India

- Interactive map of the Choice Paradise, Kochi area

General information
- Status: Completed
- Type: Residential
- Location: Tripunithura, Kochi
- Coordinates: 9.9569367°N 76.3518472°E
- Construction started: 2008
- Completed: 2010
- Opening: 2012
- Owner: Choice Group

Height
- Roof: 137 metres (450 ft)

Technical details
- Floor count: 40
- Lifts/elevators: 4

Website
- http://www.choiceconstructions.in

Choice Paradise is a residential skyscraper located at Tripunithura, Kochi, Kerala, belonging to the Choice Group. As of August 2026, it is the second tallest building in Kerala after Lulu IT Twin Towers. It can withstand earthquakes to the intensity of 7.2 on the Richter Scale. It was commissioned by actor Mohanlal in 2012. The construction started in 2008 and completed in 2010.

== See also ==
- List of tallest buildings in India
- List of tallest buildings in Kochi
- Lulu IT Twin Towers
