= SmartCity =

SmartCity may refer to:

- SmartCity Malta
- SmartCity, Kochi
- Smart city, an urban development vision
