= Department of Housing (Kerala) =

Government Department of Kerala, India

Department overview
- Jurisdiction: Kerala, India
- Headquarters: Secretariat, Thiruvananthapuram
- Annual budget: ₹141.3941 crore (US$15 million) (2026–27, revised)
- Minister responsible: Mons Joseph, Minister for Housing
- Department executives: Rajamanickam IAS, Secretary to Government; A. Geetha IAS, Housing Commissioner
- Parent department: Government of Kerala
- Child agencies: Kerala State Housing Board; Housing (Technical Cell) Department
- Website: housing.kerala.gov.in

The Department of Housing is an administrative department of the Government of Kerala responsible for formulating and implementing housing policies and programmes in the state.

The headquarters of the department is located at the Kerala Government Secretariat in Thiruvananthapuram, Kerala.

== History ==
The establishment of the Kerala State Housing Board marked a major step in planned housing development. In later years, large-scale mission-mode initiatives were introduced to address homelessness and inadequate housing conditions across rural and urban areas.

== Functions ==
The Department of Housing is entrusted with the following responsibilities:

- Formulation of housing policies and regulatory frameworks
- Implementation of state-sponsored housing schemes
- Coordination with central government housing programmes
- Slum development and rehabilitation
- Promotion of affordable and sustainable housing
- Oversight of housing-related institutions and agencies
- Rent control
- All policy matters relating to housing development in general including house site development -Nodal department for all housing schemes.

== Ministerial team ==
The Department of Housing is headed by a Cabinet Minister of the Government of Kerala. The incumbent Housing Minister is Mons Joseph.

The administrative head of the department is Secretary to Government (Housing), an officer of the Indian Administrative Service, assisted by Additional Secretaries, Joint Secretaries, Deputy Secretaries and other officials in the Secretariat.

The department functions in accordance with the Rules of Business of the Government of Kerala.

== Agencies ==
=== Kerala State Housing Board ===
The Kerala State Housing Board is a statutory body functioning under the Housing Department. It is responsible for planning, designing and executing housing projects across the state, including group housing schemes, rental housing and infrastructure development.

The board implements housing projects for various income groups and also undertakes redevelopment and rehabilitation projects.

=== LIFE Mission] ===
The Livelihood, Inclusion and Financial Empowerment (LIFE) Mission is a flagship housing programme of the Government of Kerala aimed at providing free houses to landless and homeless families. Operating under the Department of Housing, the mission integrates resources from state, central and local governments.

LIFE Mission focuses on ensuring housing with basic amenities such as sanitation, drinking water and electricity.

=== Kerala State Nirmithi Kendra ===
The Kerala State Nirmithi Kendra (KSNK) is an autonomous agency under the Housing Department, Government of Kerala, promoting cost-effective and sustainable building technologies through technical support and consultancy across the state. It is headed by a Director, appointed by the government.

== Housing schemes ==
Major housing schemes implemented or coordinated by the department include:

- LIFE Mission Housing Scheme
- State-sponsored affordable housing projects
- Centrally assisted housing programmes
- Slum rehabilitation and redevelopment schemes

=== State sponsored schemes ===
- LIFE Mission – Houses for landless and homeless families
- Kudumbashree Housing Schemes – Slum improvement and urban poverty housing projects
- Jawaharlal Nehru National Urban Renewal Mission – Urban housing and infrastructure programme, including Basic Services for Urban Poor and Integrated Housing and Slum Development Programme
- Basic Services for Urban Poor – Housing and basic services for urban poor
- Integrated Housing and Slum Development Programme – Housing and infrastructure for slums and small towns
- Indira Awaas Yojana – Rural housing for BPL families
- Fisheries Department Housing Schemes – Housing and repair for fishermen families
- Innovative Housing Scheme for Urban Poor – Rental housing for low-income and migrant workers
- Saphalyam Housing Scheme – Flats for landless and houseless families
- Grihasree Housing Scheme – Financial assistance for Economically Weaker Section/LIG house construction
- One Lakh Housing Reconstruction Scheme – Reconstruction of houses under the previous One Lakh Housing Scheme
- Sainik Welfare Housing Scheme – Grants for ex-servicemen, war widows, and dependents

== See also ==
- Government of Kerala
- Kerala State Housing Board
