= Lulu IT Twin Towers =

Twin tower skyscraper in Kochi, India

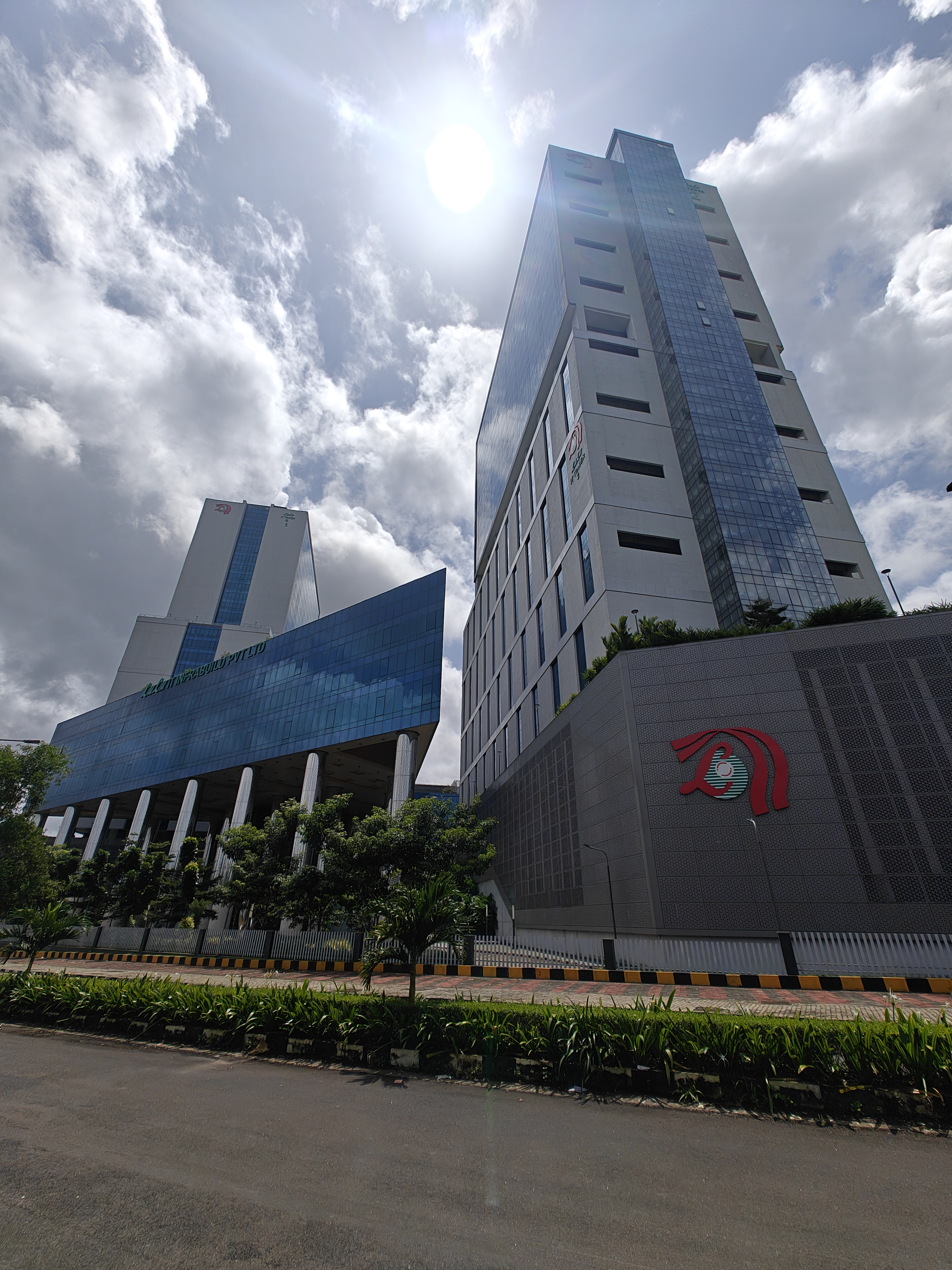

General information
- Status: Completed
- Location: Kakkanad, Kochi, Kerala
- Coordinates: 10.0123°N 76.3723°E
- Construction started: 2019
- Completed: 2025
- Owner: LuLu Group International

Height
- Height: 152 metres (499 ft)

Technical details
- Floor count: 33
- Floor area: 3,500,000 sq ft (325,000 m^{2})

Design and construction
- Architect: RSP India
- Developer: Lulu IT Infrabuild Private Limited
- Main contractor: Tata Projects Limited

Lulu IT Twin Towers are a pair of IT office complex skyscraper in Kochi, India. Built between 2019 and 2025, it consists of two twin towers standing at 152 metres (499 ft) with 33 floors. Located in Smart City in Kakkanad, and built at a cost of ₹1,500 crore, the total construction area of the towers are approximately 3,500,000 sq ft (325,000 m^{2}). Lulu Twin Towers were inaugurated on 28 June 2025 and are among the tallest twin skyscrapers in South India. It is also the tallest building in Kerala.

== Overview and facilities ==
The Lulu IT Twin Towers are located at Smart City Kochi Kakkanad and covers an area of 12.74 acres .The project was initially known as Sands InfinIT Towers and was developed by Sands Infrabuild, a company later renamed as Lulu IT Infrabuild. The two towers have a combined total of 3.5 million square feet of office space. The individual towers have 29 office floors and rise to 152 meters. The towers can house at least 30,000 employees.

The complex has a food court and an auditorium with a capacity to seat 600 people. The auditorium can be broken into three separate halls by using collapsible partitions. Between the two towers, there is an amenity block with an outdoor gym, several sports courts, a skateboard park, and seating areas. There is a child care center on the grounds as well.

The two towers use both traditional and robotic forms of parking. The traditional parking garage can hold 1,300 cars, while the robotic parking garage can hold up to 3,200 cars. The parking structure includes 67 elevators and 12 escalators.

The towers allow for both large businesses and small businesses. Large businesses can take an entire floor while small businesses can use a plug and play system. One entire floor is set aside for use by start up businesses.

== See also ==
- List of tallest buildings in Kerala
- List of tallest twin buildings and structures
