= Attupokatha Ormakal =

2020 autobiography by T. J. Joseph

- First edition
- Author: Prof. T.J. Joseph
- Original title: Attupokatha Ormakal
- Translator: Nandakumar K.
- Language: Malayalam
- Genre: Autobiography
- Publisher: D.C. Books
- Publication date: 06 February 2020
- Publication place: India
- Pages: 432
- ISBN: 9789352828531

Attupokatha Ormakal is an autobiography by T. J. Joseph, written in Malayalam language, published in 2020 by DC Books.

== Plot ==
Attupokatha Ormakal is based on Joseph's biography and interpretation about his controversial 2010 assault.

== Translation ==
The book was translated to English by Nandakumar K., titled A Thousand Cuts.
