= List of tallest buildings in Kerala =

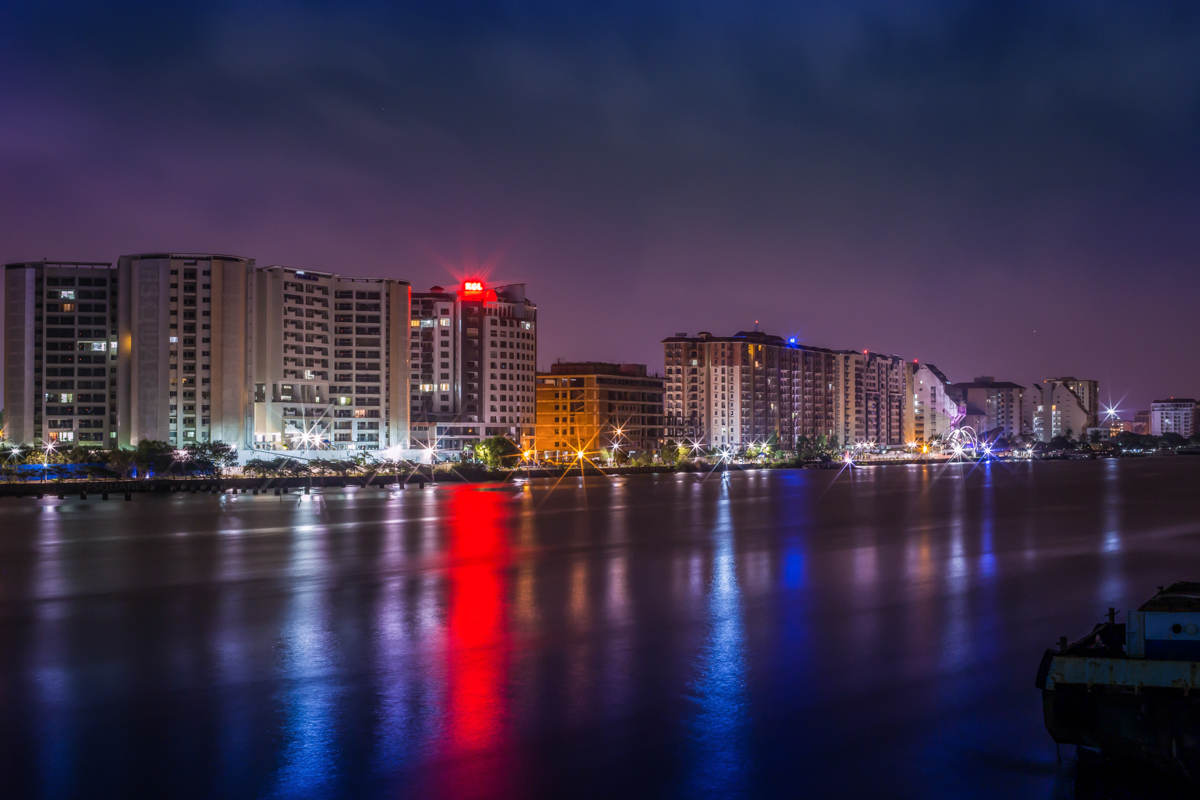
Kochi Marine Drive Skyline

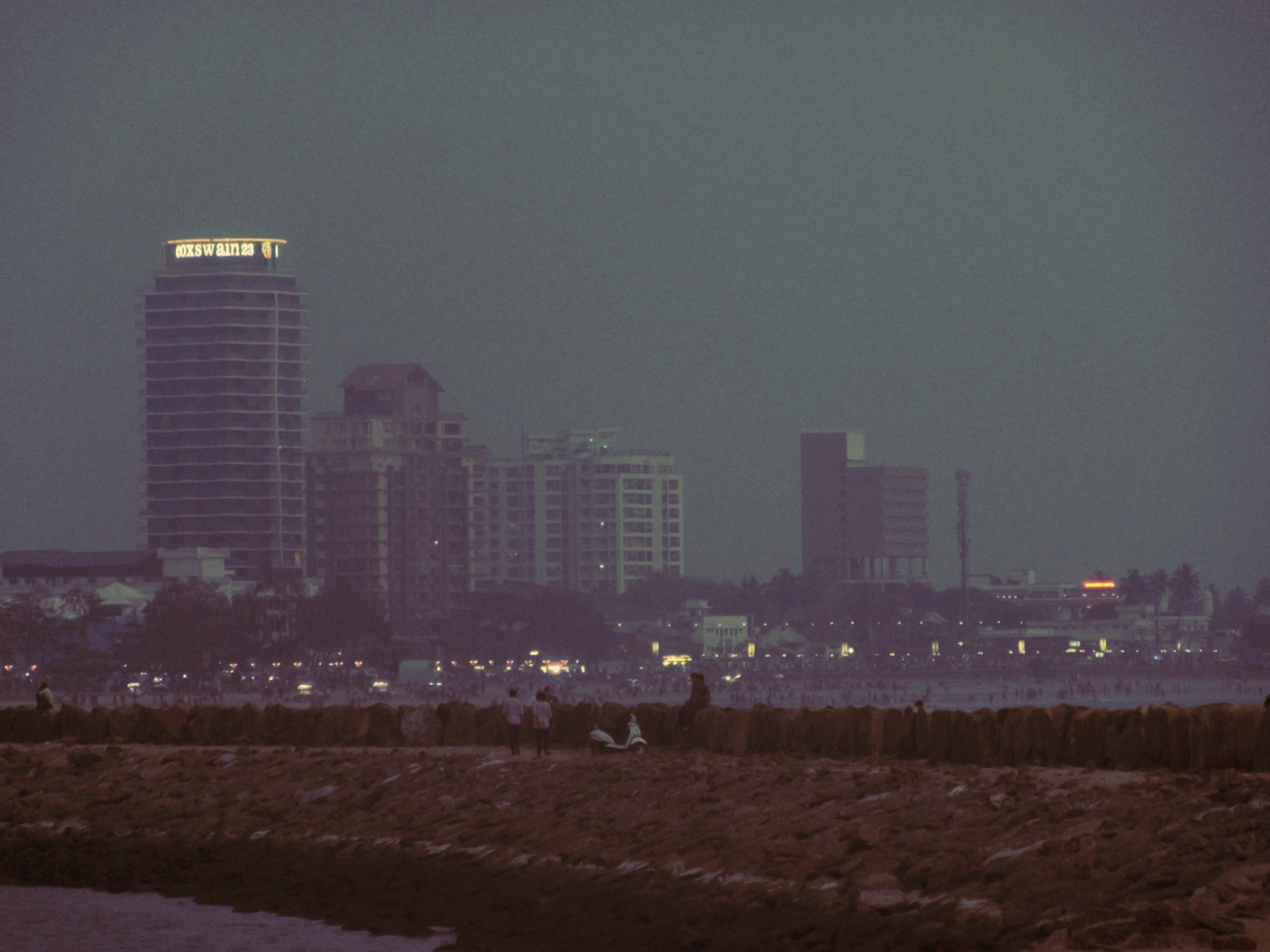
Kozhikode beach skyline

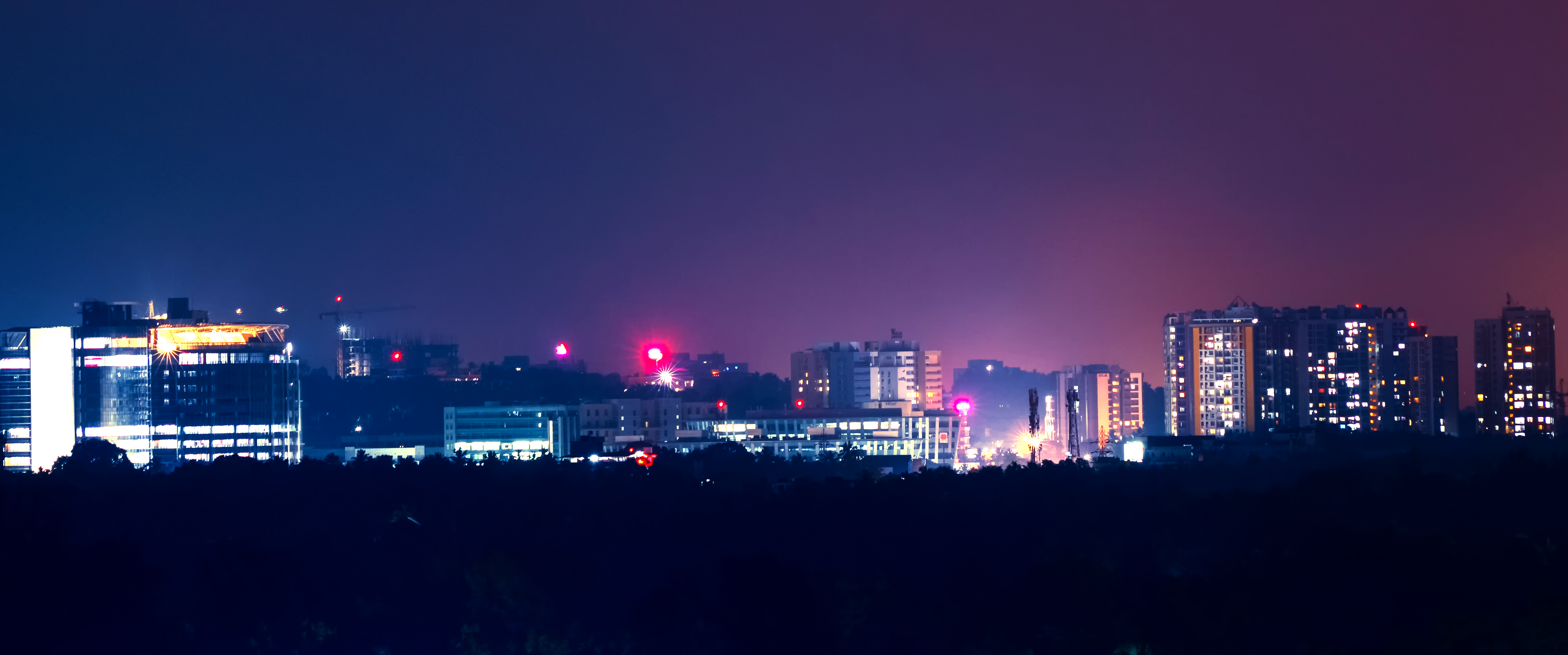
Thiruvananthapuram Techno Valley Skyline

This list of tallest buildings in Keralam ranks high-rises in Keralam, India according to their height. Keralam is one of the southern states of India. As of September 2026, the Galaxy Atmosphere in Kozhikode is the tallest building in Keralam with 50 floors and a height of 167 metres (548 ft). After completion Asset Golden Sands in Calicut will be the tallest building in Keralam at a height of 240 meters and 70 floors.

Rank	Name	City	Height	Floors	Year
1	Galaxy Atmosphere	Kozhikode	167 metres (547.90 ft)	50	2026
2	Lulu IT Twin Towers	Kochi	152 metres (499 ft)	30	2025
3	Choice Paradise, Kochi	Kochi	137 metres (449 ft)	40	2012
4	Galaxy Magnus Opus	Kozhikode	130 metres (427 ft)	38	2020
5	Nikunjam iPark	Thiruvananthapuram	123 metres (404 ft)	35	2012
6	Hilite Olympus	Kozhikode	122 metres (400 ft)	33	2026
7	MIR Jade Heights 1 n 2	Kochi	119 metres (390 ft)	33	2019
8	Tata Tritvam Tower 6	Kochi	102 metres (335 ft)	30	2017
9	Riviera Grand	Kozhikode	102 metres (335 ft)	27	2018
10	Chandys Tall County	Kottayam	99.85 metres (328 ft)	30	2017
11	Sobha Jade, Sobha City	Thrissur	98 metres (322 ft)	28	2013
12	Sobha Sapphire, Sobha City	Thrissur	98 metres (322 ft)	28	2013
13	Sobha Tapaz, Sobha City	Thrissur	98 metres (322 ft)	28	2013
14	Galaxy Ritz Marina	Kozhikode	97.5 metres (320 ft)	25	2016
15	AWHO Tower 1	Kochi	97 metres (318 ft)	28	2017
16	AWHO Tower 2	Kochi	97 metres (318 ft)	28	2017
17	Tata Tritvam Towers 1	Kochi	97 metres (318 ft)	28	2017
18	Tata Tritvam Towers 2	Kochi	97 metres (318 ft)	28	2017
19	Tata Tritvam Towers 3	Kochi	97 metres (318 ft)	28	2017
20	Tata Tritvam Towers 4	Kochi	97 metres (318 ft)	28	2017
21	Tata Tritvam Towers 5	Kochi	97 metres (318 ft)	28	2017

== Upcoming projects ==
This lists ranks buildings in Keralam which are under construction or proposed and will rise at least up to a height of 95 metres (312 ft) from the ground.

Rank	Name	City	Height	Floors	Status
1	Asset Golden sands	Kozhikode	240 metres (787 ft)	70	Proposed
2	Hilite WTC Residential	Kozhikode	236 metres (774 ft)	65	Under construction
3	Calinova Arena, Cyberpark	Kozhikode	214 metres (702 ft)	53	Proposed
4	Joy Alukkas Gold Tower	Thrissur	189 metres (620 ft)	49	Under construction
5	Galaxy Atmosphere	Kozhikode	167 metres (548 ft)	50	Under construction
6	Sobha Bellevue	Kozhikode	160 metres (525 ft)	45	Under construction
7	Galaxy Celeste Riviera	Kozhikode	138 metres (453 ft)	40	Under construction
8	Purva Grand Palms (4 Towers)	Kochi	137 metres (449 ft)	41	Under construction
9	HiLite Cyber Tower	Kozhikode	130 metres (427 ft)	28	Under construction
10	Artech Marina Kollam	Kollam	130 metres (427 ft)	40	Proposed
11	Asset Grand Terrace Kollam	Kollam	130 metres (427 ft)	33	Proposed
12	Hilite Olympus II	Kozhikode	122 metres (400 ft)	34	Under construction
13	Rahna Townspace	Thrissur	120 metres (394 ft)	35	Proposed
14	Parinee Paradise (4 Towers)	Kochi	114 metres (374 ft)	34	Proposed
15	Artech Ferns (Artech Builders)	Kollam	110 metres (361 ft)	34	Proposed
16	Purva Moonreach	Kochi	107 metres (351 ft)	32	Proposed
17	Prestige Ocean Pearl (4 Towers)	Kozhikode	102 metres (335 ft)	30	Under construction

== See also ==
- List of tallest buildings in India
- List of tallest buildings in Asia
- List of tallest buildings in Mangalore

== Upcoming projects ==
This lists ranks buildings in Keralam which are under construction or proposed and will rise at least up to a height of 95 metres (312 ft) from the ground.

Rank	Name	City	Height	Floors	Status
1	Asset Golden sands	Kozhikode	240 metres (787 ft)	70	Proposed
2	Hilite WTC Residential	Kozhikode	236 metres (774 ft)	65	Under construction
3	Galaxy Atmosphere	Kozhikode	167 metres (548 ft)	50	Under construction
4	Sobha Bellevue	Kozhikode	160 metres (525 ft)	45	Under construction
5	Galaxy Celeste Riviera	Kozhikode	138 metres (453 ft)	40	Under construction
6	Purva Grand Palms 1 (Purva Grand Palms)	Kochi	137 metres (449 ft)	41	Under construction
7	Purva Grand Palms 2 (Purva Grand Palms)	Kochi	137 metres (449 ft)	41	Under construction
8	Purva Grand Palms 3 (Purva Grand Palms)	Kochi	137 metres (449 ft)	41	Under construction
9	Purva Grand Palms 4 (Purva Grand Palms)	Kochi	137 metres (449 ft)	41	Under construction
10	Artech Marina Kollam	Kollam	130 metres (427 ft)	40	Proposed
11	Hilite Olympus II	Kozhikode	122 metres (400 ft)	34	Under construction
12	Rahna Townspace	Thrissur	120 metres (394 ft)	35	Proposed
13	Parinee Paradise 1 (Parinee Paradise)	Kochi	114 metres (374 ft)	34	Proposed
14	Parinee Paradise 2 (Parinee Paradise)	Kochi	114 metres (374 ft)	34	Proposed
15	Parinee Paradise 3 (Parinee Paradise)	Kochi	114 metres (374 ft)	34	Proposed
16	Parinee Paradise 4 (Parinee Paradise)	Kochi	114 metres (374 ft)	34	Proposed
17	Artech Ferns (Artech Builders)	Kollam	110 metres (361 ft)	34	Proposed
18	Purva Moonreach 1 (Purva Moonreach)	Kochi	107 metres (351 ft)	32	Proposed
19	Prestige Ocean Pearl-1	Kozhikode	102 metres (335 ft)	30	Under construction
20	Prestige Ocean Pearl-2	Kozhikode	102 metres (335 ft)	30	Under construction
21	Prestige Ocean Pearl-3	Kozhikode	102 metres (335 ft)	30	Under construction
22	Prestige Ocean Pearl-4	Kozhikode	102 metres (335 ft)	30	Under construction
23	Elkor Platina	Malappuram	102 metres (335 ft)	30	Under construction

== See also ==
- List of tallest buildings in India
- List of tallest buildings in Asia
- List of tallest buildings in Mangalore
