= Electronics City, Kochi =

Special Economic Zone in India

Coordinates: 10.057°N 76.360°E

Electronics City
- Type: Private Sector
- Industry: Electronics Hardware Business Park
- Genre: Special Economic Zone
- Headquarters: Kochi, India
- Owner: NeST Infratech Pvt. Ltd.

Electronics City, Kochi, also known as NeST Electronic City, was a proposed Special Economic Zone targeting electronics hardware manufacturing, promoted by NeST group located at Kochi, India. The SEZ was to be built over a land area of 30 acres (12.1 ha) in Kalamassery on a budget of ₹2500 Crores.

The notified processing area will extend to 2,000,000 sq ft (185,800 m^{2}), dedicated to Electronics Hardware Manufacturing, Software Development and IT Enabled services. It also accommodates a non processing area of 1,500,000 sq ft (139,400 m^{2}) occupied by a shopping mall with multiplex and an international convention centre, as well as residential apartments and condominiums.

== Location and connectivity ==
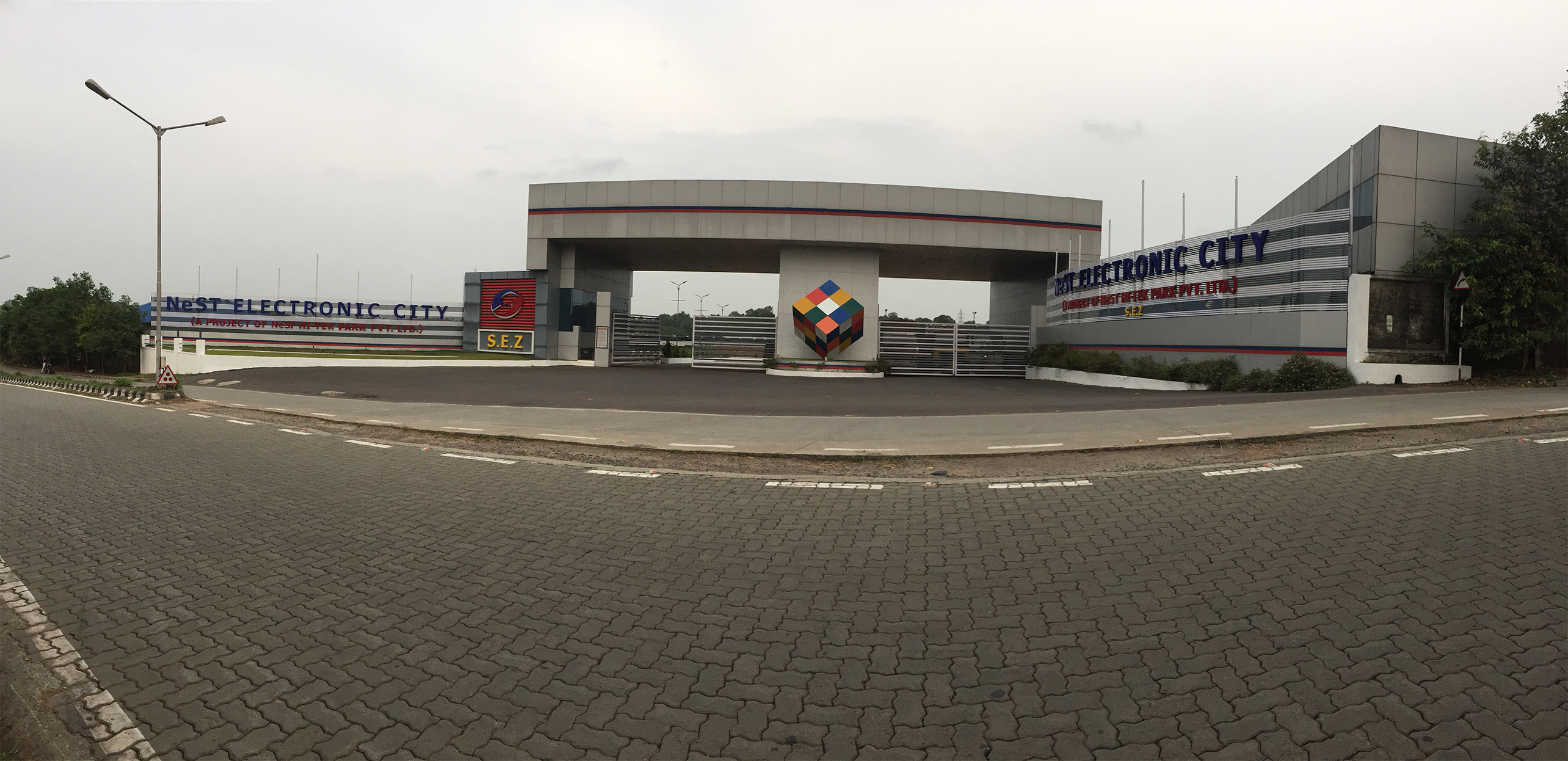
Electronic City entrance

The township is located 17 km from the city centre and 22 km from Cochin International Airport, among an area where a number of other similar developments are being planned. The distance to NH 544 is 5 km.

The VSNL’s communication gateway is located less than 7 km from the park. This gateway handles around 70% of the country’s Network traffic. Two Submarine cables, namely SAFE and SEA-ME-WE 3 have their landing points at the gateway. Kochi offers Pacific and Atlantic route of connectivity to the US.

== Infrastructure ==
70% of the built up area of the township will be used for IT and ITES industries. The remaining 30% will be non processing area, used for residential, commercial and entertainment purposes.

== See also ==
- Economy of Kochi
- Infopark, Kochi
- Smart City
- Marine Eco City, Kochi
