= Marine Eco City, Kochi =

Under construction mixed-use development in Kochi, India

Marine Eco City

General information
- Status: Under construction
- Type: Mixed Use
- Location: Marine Drive , Kochi, Kerala, India
- Groundbreaking: March 2026
- Cost: ₹2400 crores ($251 million)
- Owner: Government of Kerala

Design and construction
- Developer: Kerala State Housing Board; National Buildings Construction Corporation

Marine Eco City is a mixed-use development under construction at Marine Drive in the city of Kochi, Kerala, India. The project is developed by the Kerala State Housing Board, which comes under the Government of Kerala, in partnership with the National Buildings Construction Corporation. Planned on a 17.9-acre site, the foundation stone for the project was laid in March 2026.

== Overview ==
The Marine Eco City is being developed at 17.9 acres of land situated adjacent to the Goshree Junction and the BPCL Housing Complex at Marine Drive in Kochi. The Kerala State Housing Board (KSBH) proposed and subsequently modified the design for the development more than a decade earlier. In September 2023, the KSHB signed an agreement with NBCC (India) Limited for the development of the project. NBCC would act as the project management consultant for the development. The Government of Kerala had included the developmental project in its 2025-26 budget with an estimated cost of 2,400 crores.

The development of the Marine Eco City is proposed in 3 stages. The first stage proposes the development of a residential-cum-commercial tower on 3.16 acres, consisting of 152 apartments and retail and office spaces. The adjacent tower will have a parking block. The residential component will consist of 80 three-bedroom and 72 four-bedroom apartments. The estimated cost for the phase is around ₹480 crore.

The remaining 14.74 acres will serve as the basis for the subsequent developmental stages. Within this stage, a three-building development will comprise 105 rooms, a five-star category hotel, and a convention center. Within phase three, six residential towers, roughly 952 apartments of which 538 will be three-bedroom and 414 will be four-bedroom, will be constructed. Each tower will consist of a lower ground level, ground level, and twenty-eight upper levels. The total built-up area of the second and third phases is roughly 44.2 lakh square feet, inclusive of parking.

The foundation stone for the project was laid by Kerala Chief Minister Pinarayi Vijayan on 12 March 2026 through an online ceremony held at the KTDC Convention Centre in Bolgatty.

== See also ==
- Kochi
- Kerala State Housing Board
