= SmartCity Kochi =

IT based special zone in Kochi city

Coordinates: 10.008°N 76.371°E

SmartCity, Kochi
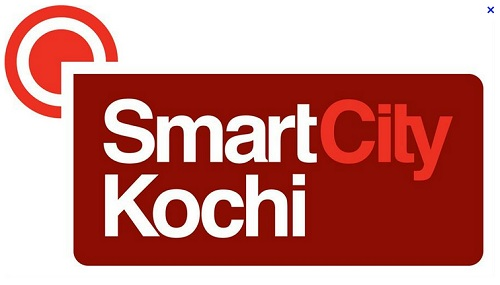
- Industry: Information Technology Business Park
- Genre: Infrastructure Service Provider
- Headquarters: Kochi, Kerala, India
- Key people: Manoj Nair, CEO
- Owner: 16% Government of Kerala, 84% Dubai Holding
- Number of employees: 10,000
- Website: www.smartcity-kochi.in

SmartCity Kochi is an information technology special economic zone in Kochi, Kerala, India. A joint venture company named Smart City (Kochi) Infrastructure Pvt. Ltd. was formed by Government of Kerala (16% holding) and Dubai Holding (84% holding) to implement the project. The project is spread over an area of 246 acres (99.6 ha) and envisions a minimum 8.8 million sq ft of built up space out of which at least 6.21 million sq ft will be specifically for IT/ITES/allied services. The project is expected to create over 90,000 direct jobs.

The Phase 1 of the project, consisting of a 6,50,000 sq. ft. IT tower named SCK-01 and associated infrastructure, was inaugurated on 20 February 2016, by the then Chief Minister of Kerala, Oommen Chandy. SmartCity Kochi is one of the first two projects of SmartCity's vision to build a large network of knowledge-based industry townships across the world. Other being SmartCity Malta, whose first phase was inaugurated in October 2010. As of 2026, SmartCity has a total built-up area of 5.7 million sq.ft and houses more than 50 companies which includes Fortune 500 corporations such as Baker Hughes and Ernst & Young, employing close to 10,000 professionals.

== History ==
The project was originally initiated by P.K. Kunjalikkutty the IT Minister in the UDF government in 2004. Later when Oommen Chandy was the Chief minister, the government invited the Dubai Internet City officials for a feasibility study and later the Memorandum of Understanding (MoU) was signed in year 2005. Due to protest from opposition parties who alleged that the agreement is not in the best interests of the state and due to upcoming state assembly election, the government could not go ahead with the project.

After V. S. Achuthanandan took over as the chief minister, he invited the Dubai Internet City team for another round of discussions. He proposed new suggestions and altered the earlier MoU signed by the Oommen Chandy government. On 13 May 2007, the officials of the Government of Kerala and TECOM Investments signed the updated framework agreement. Then for the next four years, the project was in a standstill mode due to few unresolved differences between state government and TECOM. The main hurdle was TECOM's demand for selling rights on the 12% free-hold land. Government was ready to give the 12% free-hold land only inside the SEZ, which made it impossible for TECOM to sell that portion to a third party under the SEZ policy by the Government of India.

These issues were resolved on 2 February 2011, in a meeting between Chief Minister V. S. Achuthanandan and His Excellency Ahamed Humaid Al Tayer, member of the Supreme Fiscal Committee for Dubai World Group and Dubai Holding Group, UAE. This breakthrough was arrived as a result of the mediation by the Vice Chairman of Norka-Roots and a renowned businessman from the state M. A. Yousuf Ali.

== Progress of the project ==
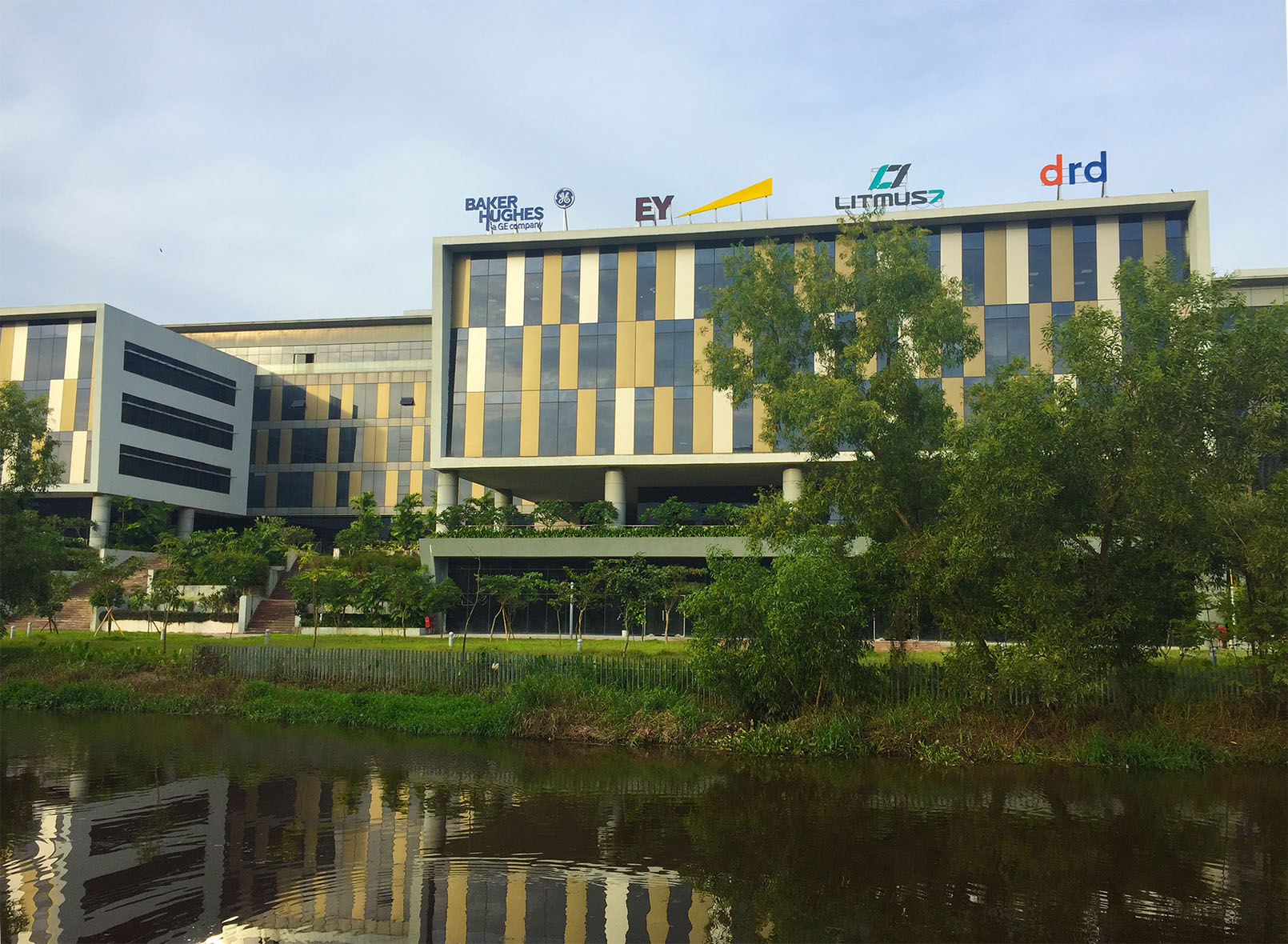
The inaugural IT building SCK-01 in Phase 1

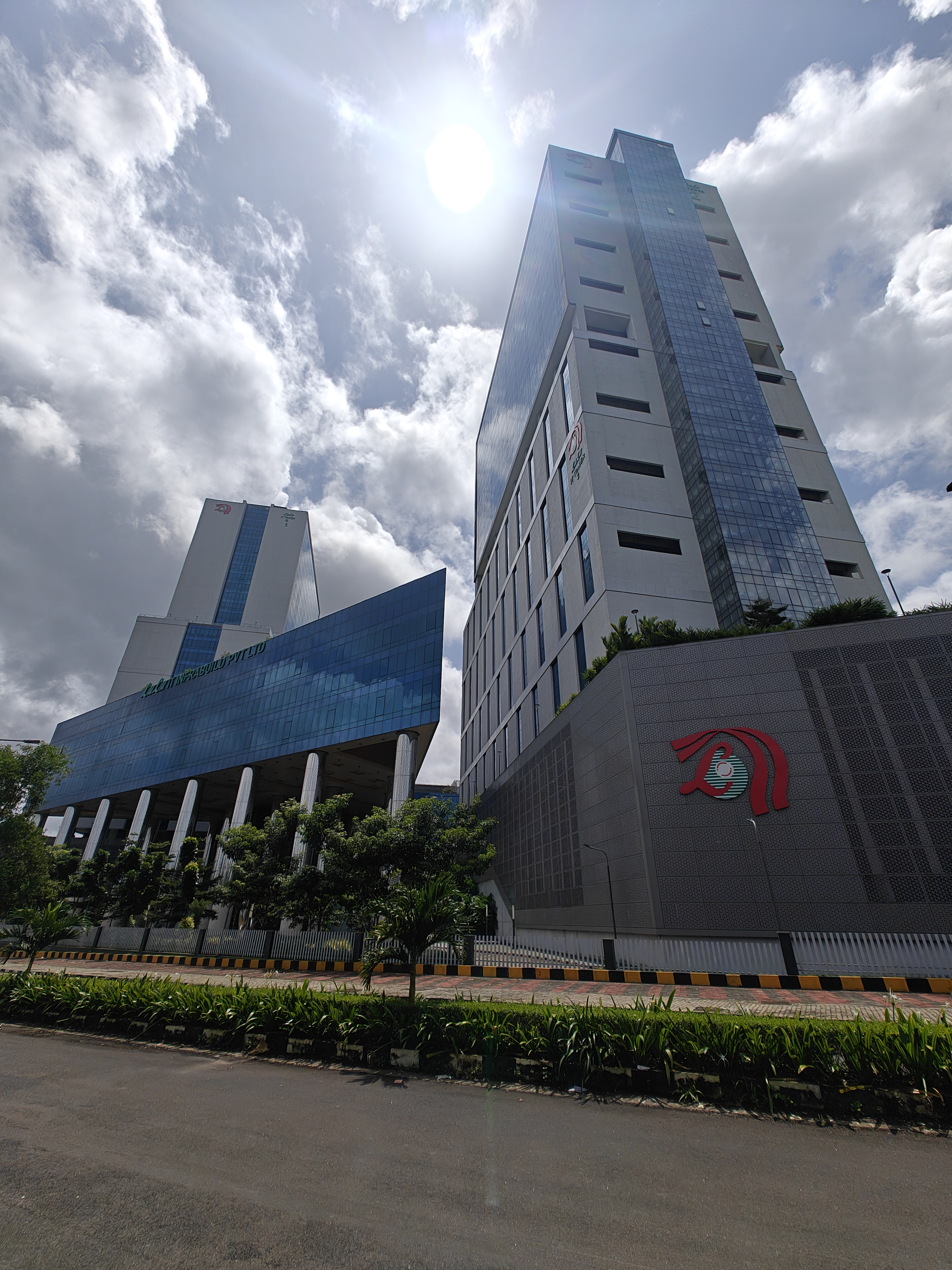
LuLu Twin towers in Phase 1

After the breakthrough on the disputes in February 2011, the project has gained momentum and is in the construction stages now. Construction of SmartCity was launched by the Chief Minister Mr. Oommen Chandy on 8 October 2011 in a glittering event held at site. The SmartCity Experience Pavilion, which locates the offices for the administrative and project management team, was launched on 9 June 2012. The Phase I of the project was inaugurated on 20 February 2016, by the then Chief Minister of Kerala, Oommen Chandy.

Ministry of Commerce have granted a single SEZ status for entire 246 acres of land in December 2011. There were few issues in getting a single SEZ status as the land is separated by a waterbody. Approval for the project as a single SEZ was important to avail the benefits of a multi-purpose SEZ.

The first phase which started operations in May 2016, involves a four storied building with 6,50,000 sq. ft. space, which is one of India's largest LEED Platinum rated IT buildings.

The second phase, which includes development in excess of 6 million sq. ft., is currently in progress and expected to be completed by 2021. The development is carried out with the support of various co-developers who have signed agreements with SmartCity Kochi. Sands Infra, a subsidiary of Abu Dhabi-based LuLu Group, is constructing 32-storied twin towers which are slated to become India's tallest IT towers. The development encompasses 3.7 million sq.ft of built up area with the potential to generate jobs in excess of 30,000 when fully occupied. Further developments include the construction of 1.2 million sq.ft of built-up space across the two towers by Bangalore-based Prestige Group, 1.5 million sq.ft by Dubai-based Holiday Group, 4,00,000 sq. ft. by Maratt Ltd and a modern school with the capacity to accommodate over 3000 students by Dubai-based GEMS Education, world's largest private provider of K-12 education. Phases three, four and five are also under discussion as the potential investors are planning to build ready-to-move-in residential plots with an estimated amount of Rs.4000 crore.

Buildings in SmartCity
Building	Phase	Available Size	Year of commission
Operational
SCK-01	Complete	650,000 sq ft (60,400 m^{2})	2016
GEMS Modern Academy	Complete	200,000 sq ft (18,600 m^{2})	2019
MariApps	1	185,000 sq ft (17,200 m^{2})	2021
Prestige Cyber Green-1	1	877,630 sq ft (81,500 m^{2})	2022
LuLu IT Twin Towers	Complete	3,500,000 sq ft (325,200 m^{2})	2025
Maratt Tech Park	Complete	531,000 sq ft (49,300 m^{2})	2026
Under Construction
MariApps	2	60,000 sq ft (5,600 m^{2})	2027
Prestige Cyber Green-2	2	621,000 sq ft (57,700 m^{2})	2025
SOTI Inc Campus	1	350,000 sq ft (32,500 m^{2})	2028
Arya Bhangy IT Campus	1	300,000 sq ft (27,900 m^{2})	2028
Smart Biz Bay	1	50,000 sq ft (4,600 m^{2})	2028
Holiday Group IT Tower	1	1,470,000 sq ft (136,600 m^{2})	2028

== Agreement ==
According to the agreement signed by the Government of Kerala and Tecom investments, the project expects an investment of ₹2000 Crore. The project would be spread over 246 acres (99.6 ha). On completion, SmartCity Kochi would be one of the largest IT parks in the country. The project is expected to have minimum 8,800,000 sq ft (820,000 m^{2}) of built up space with a minimum of 6,200,000 sq ft (580,000 m^{2}) set aside for IT/ITES/allied services. It was to be the first SmartCity project in India and second in the world by the Tecom Investments group.

== Location and connectivity ==
SmartCity Kochi is located approximately 12 kilometres (7 mi) from downtown Kochi and 22 kilometres (14 mi) from the Cochin International Airport. It is located in Kakkanad, which is the Ernakulam district headquarters. The project site is located adjacent to InfoPark, Kochi, one of the state owned IT parks in Kerala. The presence of InfoPark, SmartCity, KINFRA Park, etc., makes the region of Kakkanad a very important center for IT/ITES in the state of Kerala.

PeakAir Pvt Ltd handles a major portion of the data traffic inside SmartCity and has a Data Center inside SmartCity, which provides the park with 100% uptime data connectivity. Other major bandwidth providers such as Vodafone, Tata Communications, BSNL, Reliance, Bharti Airtel and Power Grid Corporation of India are also present in the park.

== See also ==
- Dubai Internet City
- Lulu IT Twin Towers
- Infopark, Kochi
- Electronics City, Kochi
- Cyber City, Kochi
- Marine Eco City, Kochi
