= Saddle stitcher =

A gathering and stitching machine or saddle-stitcher is a printing postpress machine used to collate and stitch multiple signatures. The machine then cuts the stapled signatures so that the booklets may be opened.

Numerous companies produce saddle-stitchers, among them Heidelberger and Muller Martini.
