= Centre Square Mall, Kochi =

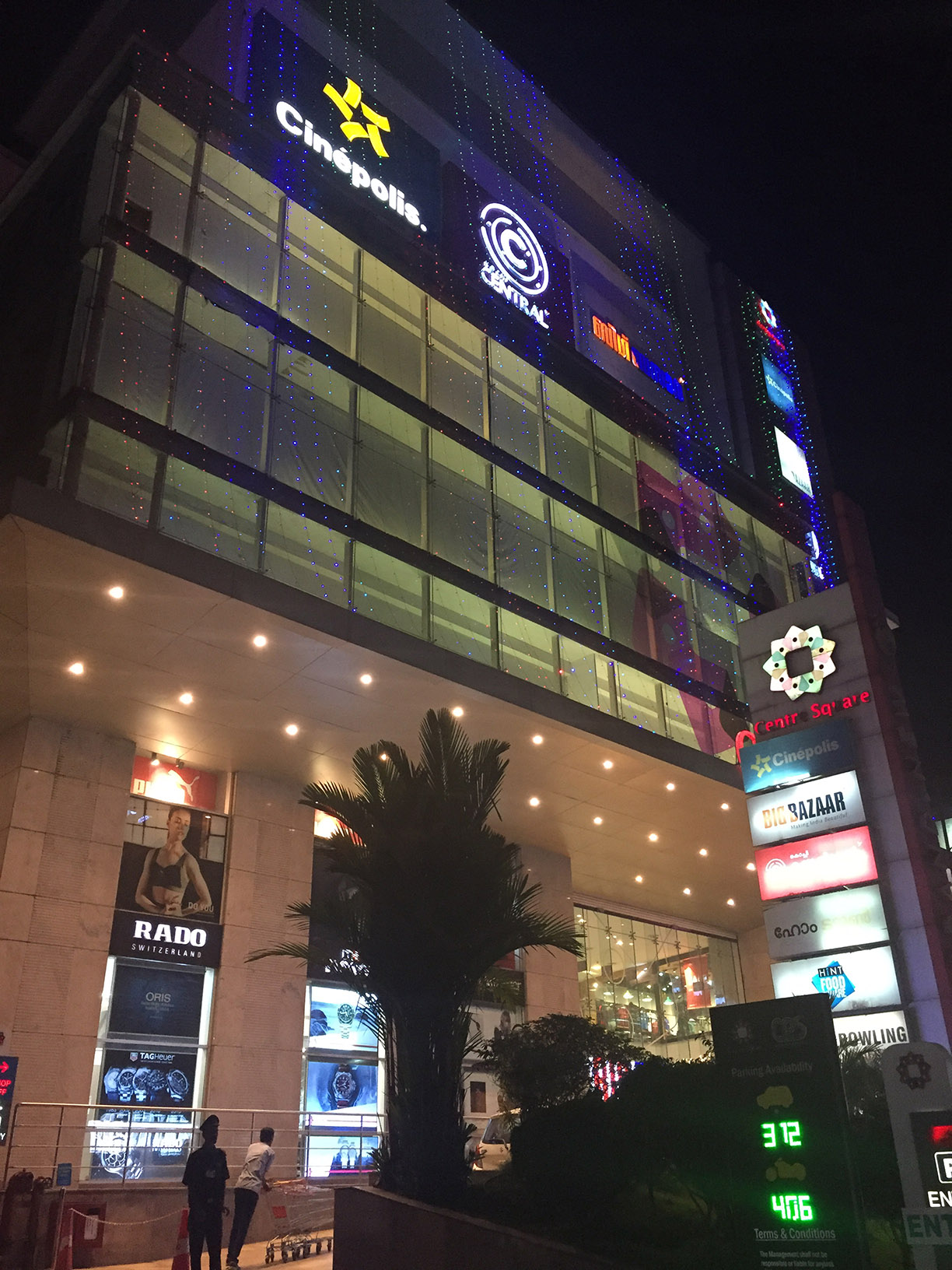
- Location: Kochi, Kerala, India
- Coordinates: 9°58′40.71″N 76°17′0.44″E
- Address: 40/6972, Rajaji Junction, M.G Road, Kochi - 682035
- Opened: 5 September 2013; 13 years ago
- Owner: Peevees Projects
- Architect: Cherian Varkey Construction Company
- Num. of stores: 89
- Num. of anchor tenants: 3
- Floor area: 630,000 square feet (59,000 m^{2}) (Total built up area)
- Floors: 7
- Website: www.centresquarekochi.com

Centre Square Mall is a shopping mall in the city centre of Kochi in Kerala, India, launched in 2013. Located on MG Road, the mall is spread over 2.5 acres and is owned and operated by Peevees Projects. Anchor stores include Centro, Smart Bazaar, Playaza and Reliance Trends.

== Location ==
Centre Square is located at the heart of the city on the Mahatma-Gandhi Road, MG Road, Kochi, Kerala. The nearest Kochi metro station is "Maharajas College" (walking distance of around 550m).

== Features ==
- Centro store spread over 4 floors
- Smart Bazaar spread over 2 floors
- Anchor stores & other lifestyle retail
- Food Court with multi cuisine outlets
- Cinepolis multiplex with an IMAX screen
- 3 level basement parking
