= Muthoot Technopolis =

Coordinates: 9.9930168°N 76.2906607°E

Muthoot Technopolis is an information technology park at Kochi, India. It has a built up space of 350,000 sq ft (33,000 m^{2}) which has been fully occupied by Cognizant, Williams Lea and Sutherland Global Services. It is the Plot #1 in CSEZ

Muthoot Pappachan Group is planning on expansion in Kochi with phase II of the project and further developments in the vicinity. Muthoot also runs the Muthoot ceramics which is behind the Muthoot Technolpolis in Cochin Special Economic Zone, though CSEZ area is separated with Technopolis by wall.

== See also ==
- Economy of Kochi
- Cochin Special Economic Zone
