= Marine Products Export Development Authority =

Statutory body in India

Statutory body overview
- Formed: 24 August 1972 (53 years ago)
- Preceding Statutory body: Marine Products Export Promotion Council (1961 – 1972)
- Type: Statutory body
- Jurisdiction: Government of India
- Headquarters: Kochi, Kerala, India
- Minister responsible: Piyush Goyal, Minister of Commerce and Industry
- Statutory body executives: P. Jawahar, IAS, Chairman; Dr. Ram Mohan M K, Director
- Parent department: Department of Commerce
- Website: mpeda.gov.in

The Marine Products Export Development Authority (MPEDA) is a statutory body established in 1972 under the Ministry of Commerce and Industry, Government of India to promote and regulate the export of marine products. It is headquartered in Kochi.

MPEDA has regional offices, sub regional divisions, and desk offices across various cities in India, and trade promotion offices at New Delhi, Tokyo, and New York.

== History ==
It was constituted on 24 August 1972 by the provisions of the Marine Products Export Development Authority Act 1972 (No.13 of 1972) under the Ministry of Commerce and Industry, Government of India, replacing the erstwhile Marine Products Export Promotion Council established in September 1961. Its mandate is to promote the export of marine products from India and to serve as a regulating authority for ensuring sustained and export quality seafood.

== Services offered by MPEDA ==
- Registration of infrastructure facilities for seafood export trade
- Collection and dissemination of trade information
- Projection of Indian marine products in overseas markets by participation in overseas fairs and organising international seafood fairs in India
- Implementation of development measures vital to the industry like distribution of insulated fish boxes, putting up fish landing platforms, improvement of peeling sheds, modernisation of industry such as upgrading of plate freezers, installation of IQF machinery, generator sets, ice making machineries, quality control laboratory etc.
- Promotion of brackish water aquaculture for production of prawn for export
- Promotion of deep sea fishing projects through test fishing, joint venture and equity participation
