= Cochin Special Economic Zone =

Special economic zone in Kochi

Coordinates: 10.005°N 76.344°E

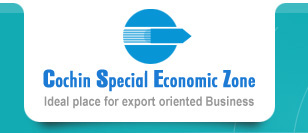
- Type: Government owned
- Industry: Multi-product industrial park
- Genre: Infrastructure service provider
- Founded: 1984
- Headquarters: Kochi, India
- Number of locations: 160+
- Owner: Government of India
- Number of employees: 15,000+
- Website: www.csez.com

The Cochin Special Economic Zone (CSEZ) is a multi-product special economic zone located at Kochi, Kerala. It is established in an area of 41.7 hectares (103.0 acres) in Kakkanad.

It is a multi-product zone, with industrial units operating in Electronics Hardware, Engineering, Gem & Jewellery, IT & ITES, Agro & Food Processing, Textile & garments, Plastic & Rubber etc. Currently it has around 160 units operating employing more than 15,000 people. In FY2011-12, the total exports from the zone stood at ₹ 29,961 crore, recording a 63% rise in exports compared to the previous financial year.

For the current financial year 2012–13, as on 30 September 2012, the total exports from CSEZ stand at ₹ 16,306 crore, ranking it the third among SEZs in the country.

CSEZ was originally started as one of the first Export Processing Zone in India, and was later converted into a Special Economic Zone in 2003, when that system was introduced. It is operated by the Government of India, Ministry of Commerce, under the CSEZ Authority, and headed by a Development Commissioner. It is the first integrated industrial park in Kerala.

The land area of the existing zone in Kochi has been fully utilized for ir. As part of expansion of CSEZ, a proposal to set up phase II of the Zone in 125 acres of land adjacent to the Info park in Cherthala has been mooted.

== Facilities ==
CSEZ offers standard design factory floors, and plots of land for building custom buildings. There is a dedicated building for IT/ITES units, built with private participation. Power distribution, Telephone connectivity, Water supply and sewage processing are managed by the zone authority. There is on site customs facilities for easy processing of import and export.

Most of the procedures for starting a unit is handled by the zone authority, except a few regulatory approvals from the government. The Central Board of Excise and Customs have an office dedicated for the units in the CSEZ on the premises, and all the customs procedures for import and export can be done in the unit itself. Consignments are inspected and sealed on premises, and does not require customs processing at the port entry/exit points.

The zone operates a 25MVA/110KV electrical substation exclusively for the use within the zone. This is fed from the main grid of the Kerala State Electricity Board. The zone is a licensee of power distribution, and supplies power to the units via the network of underground cables. The zone is exempt from the power-cuts normally applied to the consumers at the time of shortages.

BSNL have established a 1000 line 5ESS telephone exchange exclusively for the zone. It supports all the facilities available to PSTN, ISDN and DSL customers. The cellular operators have base stations on site, and the private telecom operators also provide telephone and high speed internet services. The international gateway of VSNL is located very close to the zone, and have established an access centre on the premises of the zone. The CSEZ authority have established an optical fiber network that serve all the buildings, where the units can avail the connectivity for data and internet access. The zone has also set up a video conferencing facility that could be availed by the units.

The Zone has its own integrated water supply system. Water is drawn from the Kadamprayar river and treated at a facility within the Zone. The system capacity is 1.5 million litres per day. A Common Effluent Treatment facility of one million litre per day capacity is established to process all the sewage and effluents let out from units. Zone units are required to send all their sewage and effluent to this treatment plant. Units are encouraged to undergo ISO 14000 certification.

There is a warehouse admeasuring an area of 24000 sq.ft. for the temporary storage requirements of CSEZ units. The Zone has an efficient drainage network and an incinerator for disposal of solid waste within the zone. The Zone also has a 35m3 capacity bio-gas plant to treat vegetable/seafood waste.

The Muthoot Technopolis is an IT Park building within the zone.

== History ==
The Government of India resolved to set up CEPZ, the predecessor of CSEZ, on 28 June 1983. Construction started on 1 May 1985 with an estimated cost of ₹ 15 Crores. The official notification for the establishment happened on 26 August 1986. The first board meeting to consider the applications for setting up units was held on 7 June 1986. M/s D. V. Deo, a manufacturer of essential oils and oleoresins, conducted the first export in October 1986.

The zone is originally envisaged to support industries operating in the fields of Electronics, Computer Software, Readymade Garments, Spices, glass products, wood products, leather products, rubber products, coir-based products, food-processing, pharmaceuticals, light engineering goods, sports goods, printing, gems and jewellery, electrical appliances, hand tools, automobile parts etc. There was a minimum stipulated value addition of 30%, with an option to reduce it to 20% for deserving cases.

During the first year, i.e. 1986–87, the zone recorded a total export of ₹ 94 lakhs, which grew to ₹ 120.31 Crores in 1995–96. The net foreign exchange earnings in this period was ₹ 200 Crores. The liberalization of the economy from 1991 boosted the performance of the zone considerably. By the next decade, the total exports has grown to ₹ 696 Crores. By the year 2009–10, the total turnover grew to ₹ 17124 crores.

Even though the zone was envisaged to leverage on the cheap labour and the locally available raw materials to facilitate the units, it saw the establishment of a few units in advanced technologies. AMP Tools, a subsidiary of AMP Inc. set up a unit to produce advanced tooling, which commenced operation in July 1992. NortPak Fiber Optics set up a unit to manufacture fiber optic switches and multiplexers in April 1993. Sun Fibre Optics started manufacturing fiber optic networking products in April 1991.

In recent years, the norms for value addition had been changed, facilitating the operation of gem and jewellery manufacturing units. The leading exports had been from this class in the recent years, followed by Electronics Hardware. The traditional items like readymade garments and rubber products had been on comparative decline.

== Units in CSEZ ==
CSEZ currently have 160 units functioning within employing around 15,000 people.

== See also ==
- Special Economic Zone
- Free trade zone
- List of SEZs in India
