= Kerala State Housing Board =

Agency overview
- Formed: 1971
- Jurisdiction: Government of Kerala
- Headquarters: Thiruvananthapuram
- Minister responsible: Mons Joseph, Minister for Revenue and Housing
- Agency executives: P Prasad, Chairman; A. Geetha IAS, Secretary and Housing Commissioner
- Parent department: Housing Department, Government of Kerala
- Website: www.kshb.kerala.gov.in

Kerala State Housing Board (Abbreviation: KSHB) is a Kerala governmental group that provides direction and planning in housing activities. It was established under Act 19 of 1971.

== History ==
Before the board, governmental and non-governmental agencies executed house building projects without co-ordination. Housing Minister's Conferences in 1957 and in 1961 recommended the establishment of a Housing Board/Corporation in every state. The Trivandrum City Improvement Trust Act in 1960 provided the framing and execution of housing projects to the city of Trivandrum. The town planning act 1108 (Act IV of 1108) applies only to the city of Travancore-Cochin area while the Madras Town Planning Act, 1920 (Madras Act VII of 1920), applies to the Malabar area. They contain certain provisions for framing and executing housing projects. Those provisions proved inadequate to meet the requirements.

Hence the Government considered it necessary to enact a comprehensive law applicable to the whole State providing organized direction and planning in the preparation and execution of housing and improvement projects and for a State Housing Board to co-ordinate the State's various housing projects. The Kerala State Housing Board Ordinance, 1970 (24 of 1970) was enacted and the Housing Board was constituted in 1971, by merging Trivandrum City Improvement Trust.

== Organisation ==
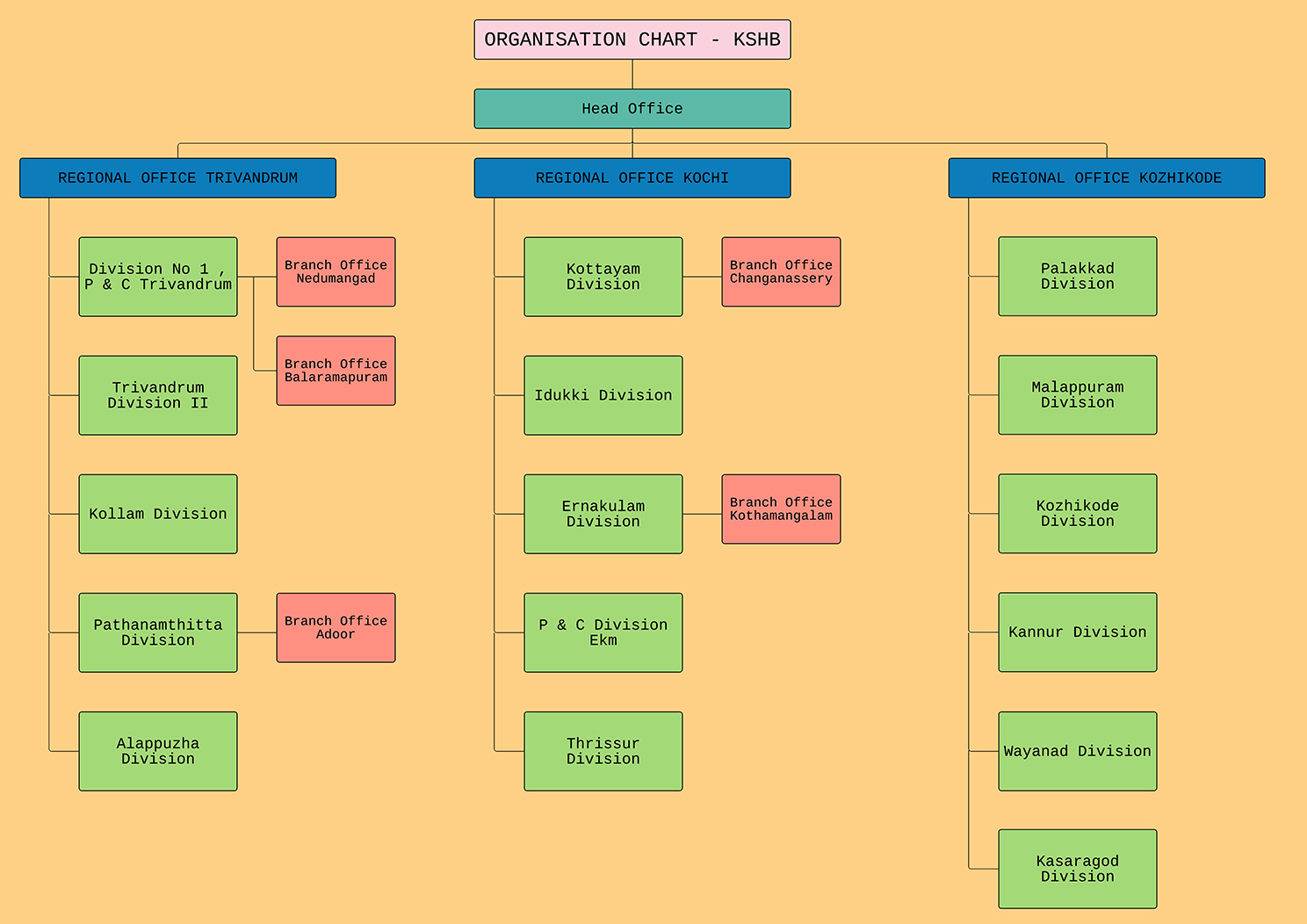
Organisation chart of KSHB

The Housing Board is governed by a Director Board headed by a Chair. Official members are appointed by the Government of Kerala and non-official members are nominated by the State Government. The Housing Commissioner is the ex-officer Secretary of the Kerala State Housing Board. Administration is vested in the Board, constituting 17 members, namely the Chair, Housing Commissioner cum ex-officer secretary, 4 official members and 11 non-official members. The KSHB consists of 39 offices with its head office at Thiruvananthapuram. The three Regional offices are at Thiruvananthapuram, Kochi and Kozhikkode and 14 division offices in all 14 districts. Two project divisions are in Trivandrum and Kochi. The Technical wing consists of 175 Engineers led by the Chief Engineer while the ministerial wing consists of 350 officers/ staff up to the Additional Secretary.

== Projects ==
KSHB implemented various housing construction and lending projects for various income groups. It includes Economically Weaker Section (EWS), Low Income Group (LIG), Middle Income Group (MIG) and High Income Group (HIG). It further organized general improvement projects such as commercial office complexes, Government-directed rental housing, slum improvement, housing complex for EWS, rehabilitation housing, revenue towers etc.

Housing projects
project	No. of Units	Remarks
M N One Lakh Housing project	12822	Renovation of houses constructed in 1971-72
Rajiv One Million Housing project	5000	in 120 Panchayat
Latur Rehabilitation project	168	For earthquake victims in Maharashtra
Slum Clearance project-Chengalchoola	418	Chengalchoola in Thiruvananthapuram
Tsunami Housing project	3624	
Wayanadu ST	270	
SC Housing project	1672	
Rehabilitation project Bangladesh Colony	216	Santhinagar Kozhikode

=== MN One Lakh House ===
This project was launched in early 1972. It was the first major attempt in India to provide adequate accommodation to very poor, landless agricultural labour families who had not received homesteads under the Kerala Land Reforms Act, 1963 as amended in 1969. The entire amount spent for the purchase of land and development of house-sites was received as subsidy from the Government of India.

=== Innovative Housing ===
A housing project was formed in the 11th five-year plan, under 2nd years programme (2008-2009). It was proposed to construct residential flats on government land for the displaced labourers in the EWS of urban area. The sites were Thrikkakara, Ernakulam and Poojappura, Trivandrum.

=== Rajiv One Million Housing ===
Rajiv One Million Housing Project was introduced in 1971. Under this project 1% of houses constructed for EWS was reserved for Physically Handicapped Persons.

=== Tsunami Housing ===
A tsunami affected Kerala coastal areas in 2004. KSHB was designated as the lead agency for the provision of coastal housing and re-settlement. The Government entrusted the construction of houses to KSHB. The Board constructed 1204 houses at Thiruvananthapuram (31), Kasaragod (270), Kannur (128), Kozhikode (567), Malappuram (208), temporary shelters at Kollam (200).

=== Suraksha Housing ===
The project is to give financial assistance for homeless EWS in urban and rural areas. Assistance was to be given to persons owning at least 2 cents of land to construct a house by themselves. The project has an option to associate Voluntary Agencies and NGOs to assist the construction.

Many projects were further implemented to waive housing loans in 2009.

=== Housing for NoRKs ===
In 2017 the KSHB planned to launch a special project for Non-Resident Keralites (NoRKs) employed abroad. The government came out with a package to provide accommodations for the five-lakh odd homeless in the State. The project took cues from the one lakh housing project, Laksham Veedu Padhathi.

== See also ==
- Housing Department, Government of Kerala
- Housing and Urban Development Corporation
