= Kakkanad =

Kakkanad കാക്കനാട്
- Location in Kerala, India Kakkanad (India)
- Coordinates: 10.017°N 76.344°E
- Country: India
- State: Kerala
- District: Ernakulam
- Elevation: 28 m (92 ft)

Languages
  - Official: Malayalam, English
- Time zone: UTC+5:30 (IST)
- Lok Sabha Constituency: Ernakulam

Kakkanad is a major industrial and residential area in Kochi in the Indian state of Kerala. It serves as the administrative headquarters of Ernakulam district and is one of Kerala's major information technology and business hubs. Located around 7 km (4.3 mi) east of the city centre, Kakkanad is home to major technology parks, including Infopark and SmartCity Kochi, as well as several government institutions and educational establishments. It also houses multiple industrial projects including the Cochin Special Economic Zone and KINFRA.

Historically a cluster of villages surrounded by paddy fields and wetlands, Kakkanad experienced rapid urbanization from the late 20th century onward. The establishment of government offices and the growth of the information technology sector transformed the area into one of the fastest-growing parts of the Kochi metropolitan region.

== Administration ==
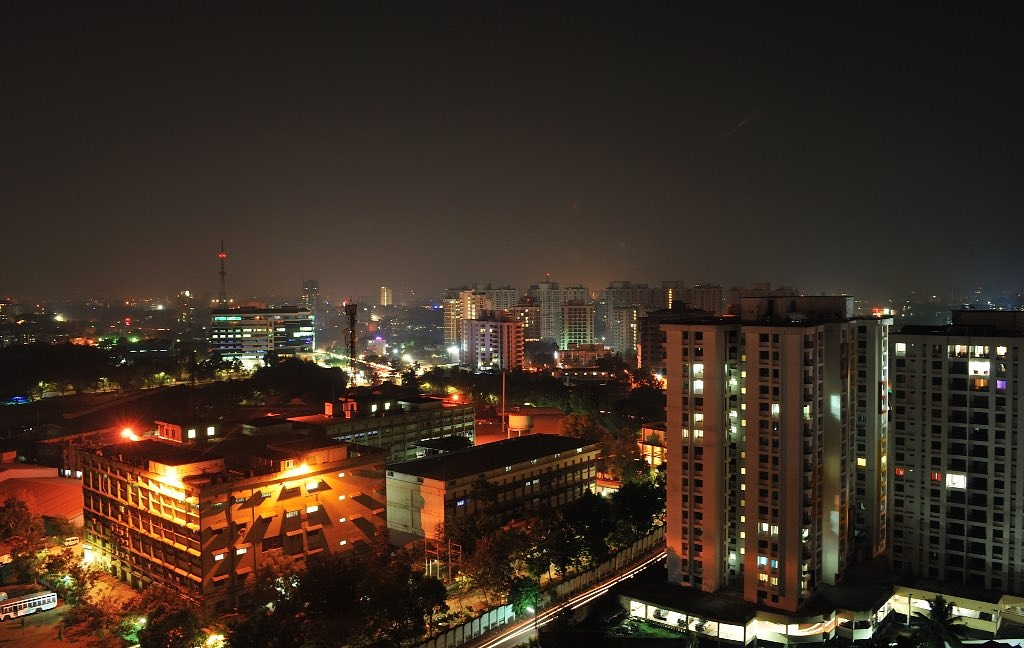
Kakkanad at night

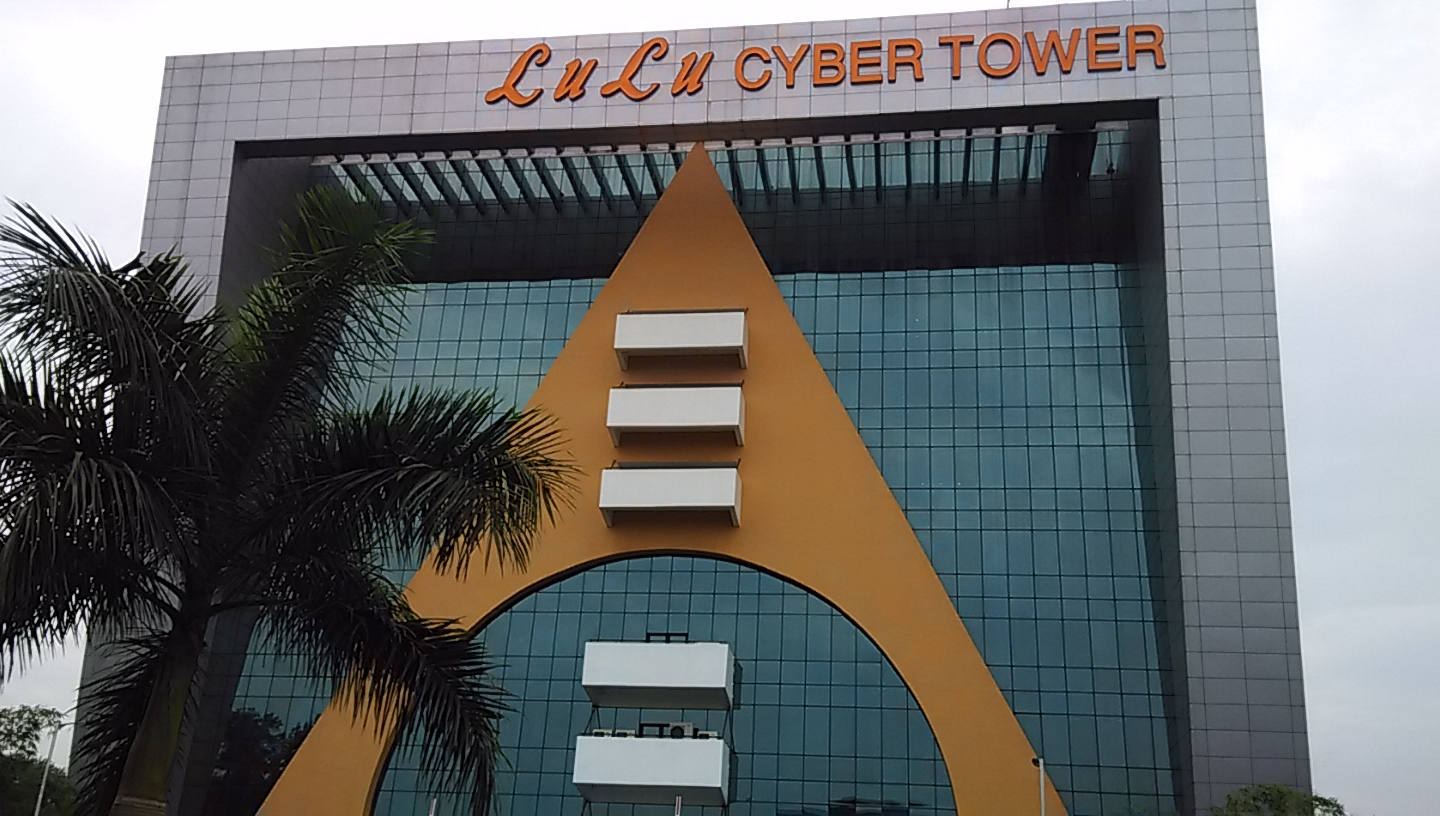
Lulu Cybertower

Being the administrative hub of Ernakulam district, Kakkanad is home to several state as well as central government offices namely, the Civil Station (hosting the District Collectorate, the RTO etc.), the District Panchayat office, the Airman Selection Board, Siksha Bhavan (office of the Central HRD Ministry), Kendriya Shram Sadan (office of the Regional Labour Commissioner) etc.

== History ==
Kakkanad is located near Thrikkakara, the capital of the mythical King Mahabali.

In verse 273 of Naṉṉūl, a 13th-century book on Tamil grammar, Sankara Namasivayar recites a venpa that describes the twelve districts of Tamil Nadu where Koduntamil is spoken, as Thenpandi Nadu, Kutta Nadu, Kuda Nadu, Karka Nadu, Venadu, Poozhi Nadu, Pandri Nadu, Aruva Nadu, Aruva Vadathalai, Seetha Nadu, Malai Nadu and Punal Nadu. "Karka Nadu" is believed to be a reference to Kakkanad. The old name of kakanad is karkanad-thrikakara.

== Industry ==
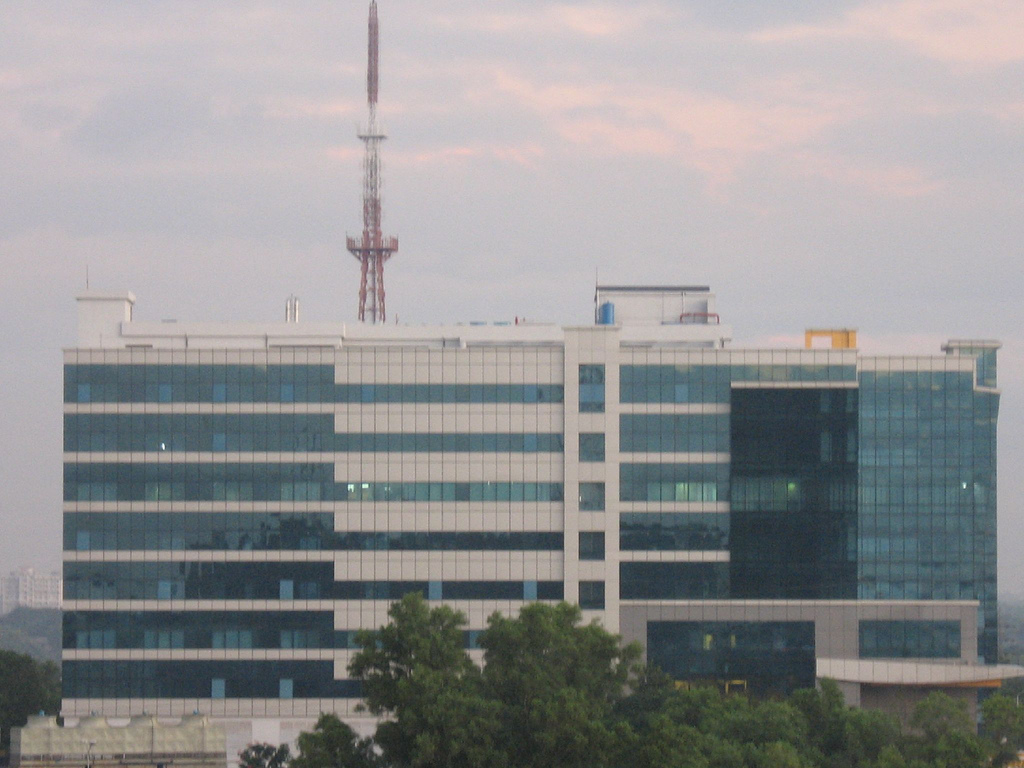
Technopolis

Kakkanad is home for a portion of the industrial base of Kochi. It is home for the Cochin Special Economic Zone (CSEZ). Carborundum Universal Ltd has a unit near the technopolis. Industrial projects like Fashion City are proposed in Kakkanad. This has led to several builders setting up projects here.

Kakkanad is home for the largest IT Township in India, the Smart City, the second largest IT industrial park in Kerala, Infopark. Kakkanad is also home for a Software Export Promotion Zone (SEPZ). The international submarine cable systems landing in Kochi has their nodes installed in Kakkanad. CSEZ houses Cognizant Technology Solutions, Williamslea, WRENCH Solutions, and the Sutherland Global Solutions.

Kakkanad houses the following IT Parks:

- Smart City
- Infopark
- Muthoot Technopolis
- KINFRA HiTech Park

− All these together account for 25% of IT exports from Kerala.

The Kerala Books and Publications Society has its press near Kakkanad. The press is the biggest multicolor offset printing unit within the Government of Kerala.

== Localities ==
- Edachira
- Chittethukara
- Nilampathinjamugal
- Thuthiyoor
- Palachuvadu
- Mavelipuram

== Media ==
Kakkanad is also the broadcasting hub of Kochi. It is home for the terrestrial relay station of the national television broadcaster, Doordarshan. Prasar Bharati, the corporation controlling the public broadcast, has a marketing division at Kakkanad. Kakkanad also hosts the state-owned All India Radio. Red FM's Regional office is also at Kakkanad.
