= Asamannoor =

- village
- Location in Kerala, India Asamannoor (India)
- Coordinates: 10.112921°N 76.5517132°E
- Country: India
- State: Kerala
- District: Ernakulam
- Taluk: Kunnathunad
- Elevation: 30 m (98 ft)

Population (2011)
  - Total: 19,311
- Time zone: UTC+5:30 (IST)
- 2011 census code: 627945

Asamannoor is a village in the Ernakulam district of Kerala, India. It is located in the Kunnathunad taluk.

== History ==
It came into existence in 1953 with six wards and seven ward members. Besides the general seat, the first ward was having a reserved seat also. Its duration was three years. The first president was K. Keshavappisharadi (two years) and then S.N. Nair. Since 1957 administrator rule is in operation.

== Demographics ==
According to the 2011 census of India, Asamannoor has 4714 households. The literacy rate of the village is 84.57%.

Demographics (2011 Census)
	Total	Male	Female
Population	19311	9574	9737
Children aged below 6 years	1806	889	917
Scheduled caste	1869	905	964
Scheduled tribe	21	14	7
Literates	16332	8322	8010
Workers (all)	7568	5467	2101
Main workers (total)	6171	4738	1433
Main workers: Cultivators	660	555	105
Main workers: Agricultural labourers	884	551	333
Main workers: Household industry workers	110	81	29
Main workers: Other	4517	3551	966
Marginal workers (total)	1397	729	668
Marginal workers: Cultivators	122	75	47
Marginal workers: Agricultural labourers	396	224	172
Marginal workers: Household industry workers	55	34	21
Marginal workers: Others	824	396	428
Non-workers	11743	4107	7636
