= Kochi Refinery =

Crude oil refinery in Kochi, India

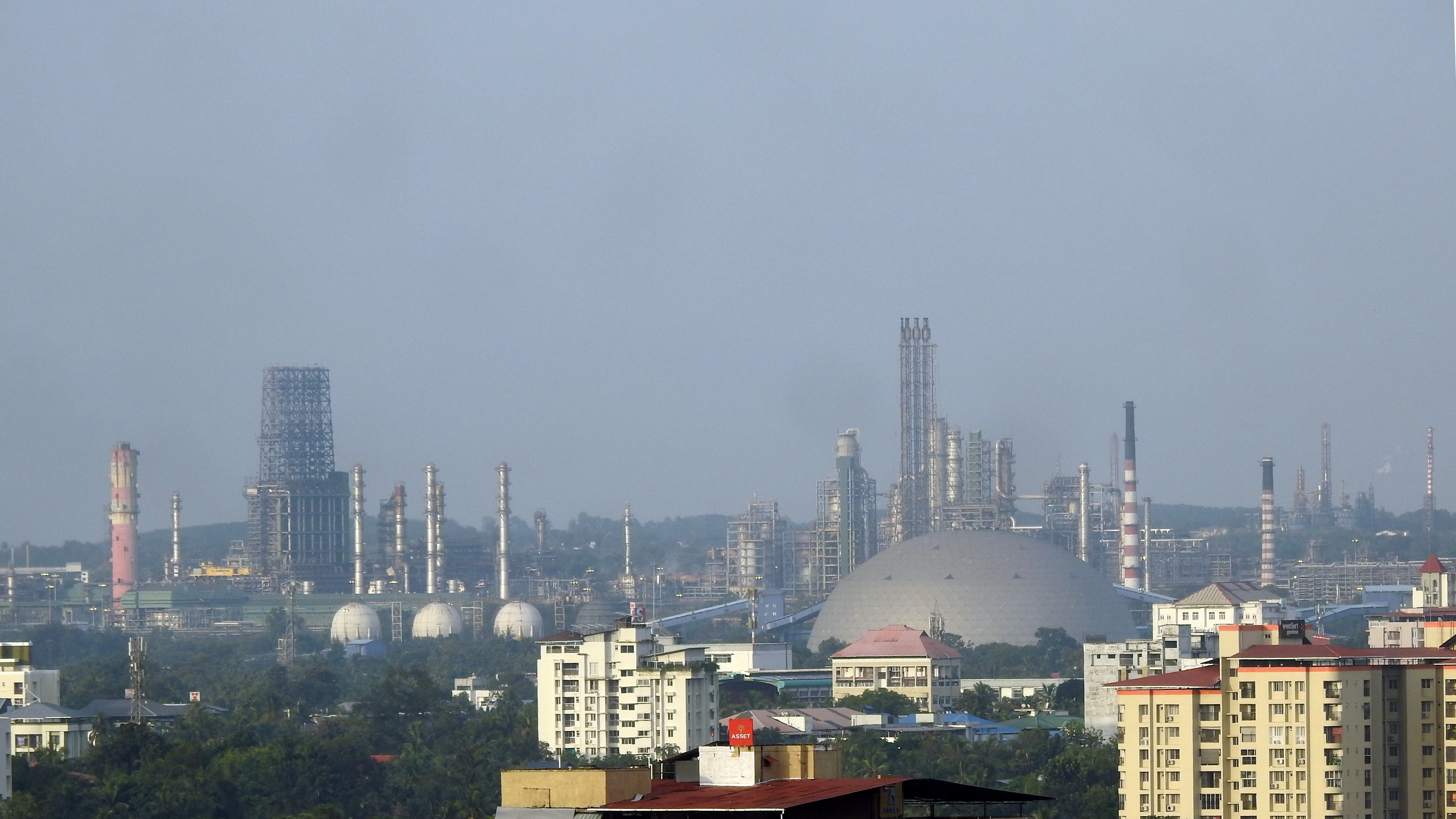
- The refinery as seen from Ernakulam.
- Interactive map of Kochi Refinery
- Location: Kochi, India; 09°58′39″N 76°22′32″E

Refinery details
- Owner: Government owned
- Opened: 27 April 1963
- Website: www.bharatpetroleum.in/bharat-petroleum-for/refineries/kochi-refinery

Kochi Refinery Limited (KRL) is a crude oil refinery in the city of Kochi in Kerala, India. It is the largest public sector refinery in India with a production capacity of 15.5 million tonnes per year. Formerly known as Cochin Refineries Limited and later renamed as Kochi Refineries Limited, it was acquired by Bharat Petroleum Corporation Limited in the year 2006. The refinery is situated at Ambalamugal, around 12 km (7.5 mi) east of the city centre.

== History ==
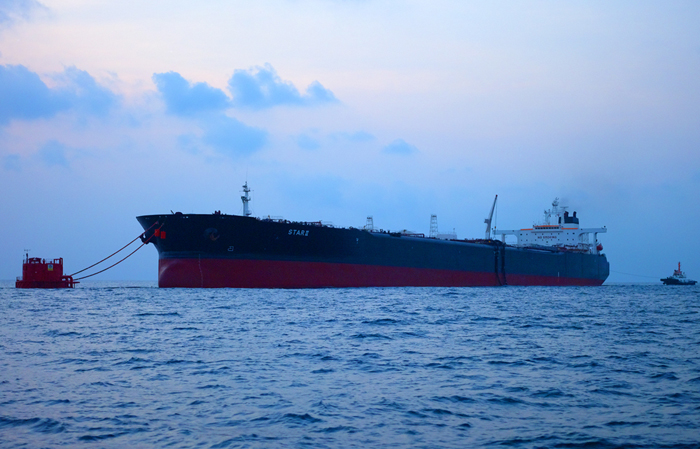
A ship arrived at Kochi Refinery

Kochi Refinery started when Government of India, Phillips Petroleum Company of USA and Duncan Brothers & Company Limited of Calcutta signed an agreement for the construction of a petroleum refinery in south India, in Kochi, Kerala.

The company was formally registered, as Cochin Refineries Ltd (CRL), on 6 September 1963 at Kochi. Phillips Petroleum International Corporation was the prime contractors for the construction of the refinery. Construction work started in March 1964 and the first unit came on stream just after 29 months in September 1966. The Prime Minister of India Ms.Indira Gandhi inaugurated it on 23 September 1966.

In 2006, Kochi Refinery was acquired by the Bharat Petroleum Corporation Limited.

== Awards ==
- Certificate of Excellence for outstanding achievement in pollution control by Kerala State Pollution Control Board.
- 'Green Manufacturing Excellence Award 2014' by M/s Frost & Sullivan for the year 2014.
- Safety Award 2013 for the meritorious performance in the field of Safety, in Category-A among very large industries, from Factories & Boilers Department- Govt. of Kerala.

== Capacity ==
The refinery had an original design capacity of 2.5 million tonnes per year which was increased to 3.3 million tonnes per year in 1973. Production of liquefied petroleum gas (LPG) and aviation turbine fuel (ATF) commenced after this expansion.

Refining capacity was further enhanced to 4.5 million tonnes per year in November 1984 when a fluidized catalytic cracking unit (FCCU) of 1 million tonnes per year capacity was added.

In Dec 1994, refining capacity was increased to 7.5 million tonnes per year along with revamp of FCCU to 1.4 million tonnes per year. A fuel gas de-sulphurisation unit was installed as part of this project to minimise sulphur dioxide emission. CRL entered into petrochemical sector in 1989 when aromatic production facilities with a design capacity of 87,200 tonnes per year of benzene and 12,000 tons per annum of toluene was commissioned. In the year 2000, a 2 million tonnes per year Diesel Hydro De-sulphurisation (DHDS) plant was added to reduce the sulphur content in diesel.

In August 2010, the refining capacity was further increased to 9.5 million tonnes per year.

A captive power plant of 26.3 MW was commissioned in 1991. An additional captive power plant of 17.8 MW was commissioned in 1998 thus making the refinery self-sufficient in power.

An LPG bottling plant of capacity 44,000 tonnes per year was commissioned in 2003. A Bitumen Emulsion plant of 10000 tonnes per year capacity has also been commissioned in 2004.

A Biturox Bitumen Oxidation Unit of 378,000 tonnes per year capacity was successfully commissioned and started-up in 2008.

== Merger with BPCL ==
Bharat Petroleum Corporation Limited (BPCL) acquired the Government of India's shares in KRL in March 2001. Consequent to the merger Order dated 18 August 2006 issued by Ministry of Company Affairs, the refinery has been amalgamated with Bharat Petroleum Corporation, henceforth to be known as BPCL-Kochi Refinery.

== Competency ==
Today Kochi Refinery is a frontline entity as the unit of the Fortune 500 company, BPCL.

With a turnover of around US$2500 million, the refinery aims to strengthen its presence in refining and marketing of petroleum products and further grow into the energy and petrochemical sectors.

Kochi Refinery is engaged in Refining and marketing of petroleum products. Beginning with a capacity of 50,000 barrels per day (7,900 m^{3}/d)(bpd), today the Refinery has a refining capacity of 310,000 bbl/d (49,000 m^{3}/d). The Company entered the petrochemical sector with benzene and toluene in 1989.

Kochi Refinery produces all fuel based refinery products viz liquefied petroleum gas, naphtha, petrol, diesel, kerosene, aviation turbine fuel, gas oil, fuel oil, and bitumen. The foray into direct marketing began since 1993 through marketing its aromatic products: benzene and toluene.

The company entered the International Petroleum business stream when its first parcel of Fuel Oil was exported in January 2001. Since then the company has exported around 100 parcels. In the last financial year the refinery exported products worth over US$280 million.

== Speciality Products ==
Kochi Refinery makes Speciality products for domestic markets Viz. Benzene, Toluene, White Spirit, Poly Iso Butene & Sulphur.

Kochi Refinery offers supplies of any grade Fuel Oil (both 180 cst and 380 cst) and Low Aromatic Naphthene (High Paraffinic) to the international market.

Kochi Refinery also produces speciality grade bitumen products like Natural Rubber Modified Bitumen, Bitumen Emulsion etc.

The Fuel Oil has been bench marked in the Singapore and Dubai Fuel Oil markets.

Currently Kochi Refinery is known as BPCL Kochi Refinery (BPCL KR). KR had undergone a capacity expansion which made it a 15.5 million tonnes per year refinery. This project called Integrated Refinery Expansion Project will also mark KR's foray into petrochemical business. It is a 20,000 crores rupees project.

== SPM ==
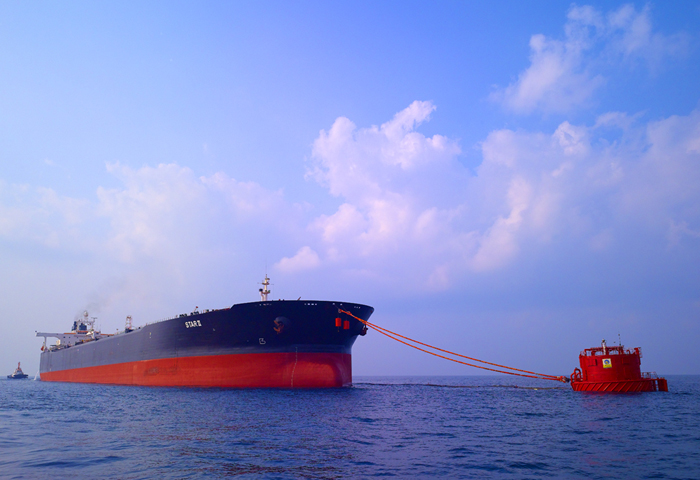
The SPM facility at offshore Kochi.

An offshore crude oil receipt facility consisting of an offshore single point mooring (SPM) facility and an associated shore tank farm (situated in Vypin). This was commissioned in December 2007. The refinery is equipped to receive crude oil in Very Large Crude Carriers (VLCCs).

== See also ==
- List of oil refineries in India
