= Ambalamugal =

Ambalamugal is an industrial suburb in the city of Kochi, Kerala, India. Situated around 12 km from the city centre, the area is heavily industrialised. Kochi Refineries and Hindustan Organic Chemicals are located here. In 2010, it was declared "critically polluted" by the Ministry of Environment and Forests, which placed a moratorium on approval of new projects.
