= List of special economic zones in India =

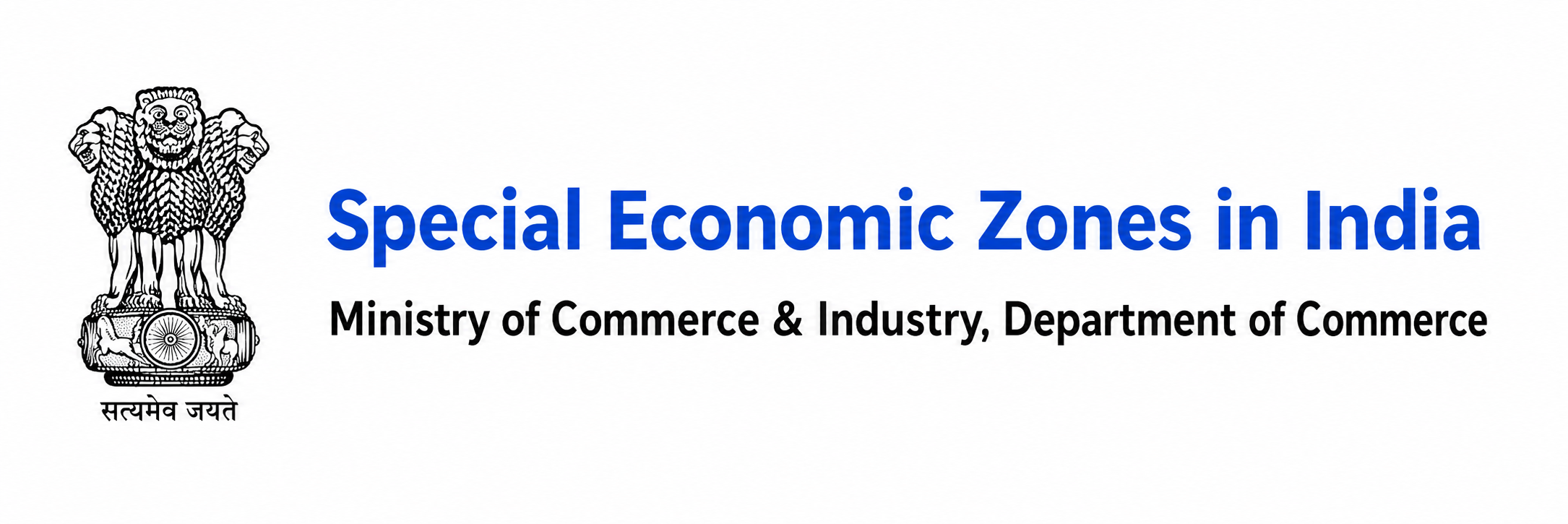
Special Economic Zones in India

A Special Economic Zone (SEZ) is a region with more relaxed economic regulation than the country as a whole. India has specific legislation governing its SEZs.

India was among the first countries in Asia to recognise the effectiveness of the Export Processing Zone (EPZ) model in promoting exports. Asia's first EPZ was established in Kandla in 1965. To overcome various shortcomings such as the multiplicity of controls and clearances, absence of world-class infrastructure, and an unstable fiscal regime, and with the aim of attracting larger foreign investments, the Special Economic Zones (SEZs) Policy was announced in April 2000.

In December 2022, the Union Minister of State for Electronics and Information Technology, Rajeev Chandrasekhar, in a written reply to a question in the Rajya Sabha, informed that Special Economic Zones exported software worth ₹5.3 lakh crore in 2021–22.

== State-wise distribution ==
State-wise distribution of SEZs (as on 31 December 2020)
State/Union Territory	Approved	Notified	Operational
Andhra Pradesh	32	27	20
Chandigarh	2	2	2
Chhattisgarh	2	1	1
Delhi	2	0	0
Goa	7	3	0
Gujarat	28	24	20
Haryana	25	22	7
Jharkhand	2	2	0
Karnataka	63	52	34
Kerala	29	25	19
Madhya Pradesh	12	7	5
Maharashtra	51	45	37
Manipur	1	1	0
Nagaland	2	2	0
Odisha	7	5	5
Puducherry	1	0	0
Punjab	5	3	3
Rajasthan	5	4	3
Tamil Nadu	56	53	48
Telangana	63	56	34
Tripura	1	1	0
Uttar Pradesh	24	21	14
West Bengal	7	5	7
Total	425	359	265

== List of State-wise Exporting SEZs ==
A list of functional Special Economic Zones in India has been published.

List of State-wise Exporting SEZs (as on 31 March 2017)
S. No.	SEZ Name	Location	DC Name	Type	State	Notification Date	Notes
1	Visakhapatnam Special Economic Zone	Visakhapatnam	Vishakhapatnam Special Economic Zone	Multi Product	Andhra Pradesh	15.03.1989	
2	Apache SEZ Development India Private Limited, Nellore	Tada Mandal, Nellore District	Vishakhapatnam Special Economic Zone	Footwear	Andhra Pradesh	08.08.2006	
3	Hetero Infrastructure Private Limited, Vskp	Nakkapalli, Vishakapatnam	Vishakhapatnam Special Economic Zone	Pharmaceuticals	Andhra Pradesh	11.01.2007	
4	Divi’S Laboratories Limited, Vskp	Chippada, Visakhapatnam	Vishakhapatnam Special Economic Zone	Pharmaceuticals	Andhra Pradesh	17.01.2006	
5	Brandix India Apparel City Private Ltd., Vskp	Achutapuram, Visakhapatnam	Vishakhapatnam Special Economic Zone	Textile And Apparel	Andhra Pradesh	10.04.2007	
6	Jawaharlal Nehru Pharma City, Ramky Pharma City (India) Pvt. Ltd, Vskp.	Parawada Mandal, Visakhapatnam	Vishakhapatnam Special Economic Zone	Pharmaceuticals	Andhra Pradesh	10.05.2007	
7	Mas Fabric Park (India) Pvt. Ltd., Nellore	Nellore	Vishakhapatnam Special Economic Zone	Textile And Apparel	Andhra Pradesh	06.11.2007	
8	M/S. Bharatiya International SEZ Ltd	Nellore	Vishakhapatnam Special Economic Zone	Leather Sector	Andhra Pradesh	04.05.2009	
9	Andhra Pradesh Special Economic Zone	Atchuthapuram, Visakhapatnam	Andhra Pradesh Special Economic Zone	Multi Product	Andhra Pradesh	12.04.2007	
10	M/S. Apiic Ltd., Naidupeta	Nellore	Vishakhapatnam Special Economic Zone	Multi Product	Andhra Pradesh	16.02.2009	
11	Parry Infrastructure Company Private Limited, Kakinada	Kakinada	Vishakhapatnam Special Economic Zone	Food Processing	Andhra Pradesh	20.12.2007	
12	Sricity Pvt. Ltd., Chittoor	Chittoor	Vishakhapatnam Special Economic Zone	Multi Product	Andhra Pradesh	20.09.2007	
13	Iffco Kisan SEZ	Nellore, A.P	Vishakhapatnam Special Economic Zone	Multi Product	Andhra Pradesh	19.04.2010	
14	Dr. Reddy's Laboratories Ltd	Srikakulam	Vishakhapatnam Special Economic Zone	Pharmaceuticals	Andhra Pradesh	24.04.2009	
15	Apiic Ltd	Village Annagi And Bodduvanipalem, Maddipadu And Korispadu, District Prakasham	Vishakhapatnam Special Economic Zone	Building Products	Andhra Pradesh	08.09.2009	
16	Apiic, Madhurwada, Hill No. 2	Visakhapatnam	Vishakhapatnam Special Economic Zone	IT/ITES	Andhra Pradesh	28.12.2006	
17	Apiic Ltd. (IT/ITES) Madhurwada, Hill No. 3	Visakhapatnam	Vishakhapatnam Special Economic Zone	IT/ITES	Andhra Pradesh	11.04.2007	
18	Apiic It SEZ Kakinada	Kakinada	Vishakhapatnam Special Economic Zone	IT/ITES	Andhra Pradesh	30.11.2011	
19	Apiic Ltd & L&T, Keesarapalli	Nakkapalli, Visakhapatnam	Vishakhapatnam Special Economic Zone	IT/ITES	Andhra Pradesh	15.01.2007	
20	Rajiv Gandhi Technology Park, Phase-1 Chandigarh	Chandigarh	Noida Special Economic Zone	Electronics Hardware, And IT/ITES	Chandigarh	19.5.2006	
21	Rajeev Gandhi Technology Park, Phase-2, Chandigarh	Chandigarh	Noida Special Economic Zone	Electronics Hardware, And IT/ITES	Chandigarh	12.9.2007	
22	Lanco Solar Pvt.Ltd	Vill.-Mehrumkhurd & Chawardhal, Chhattisgarh	Vishakhapatnam Special Economic Zone	Semiconductors	Chhattisgarh	31.01.2011	
23	Kandla Special Economic Zone	KaSEZ, Kutch	Kandla Special Economic Zone	Multi-Product	Gujarat	1.11.2000	
24	Surat Special Economic Zone	Sachin, Surat	Kandla Special Economic Zone	Multi-Product	Gujarat	01.11.2000	
25	Adani Mundra Port	Mundra	Kandla Special Economic Zone	Multi-Product	Gujarat	23.6.2006	
26	Surat Apparel Park	Vanz, Surat	Kandla Special Economic Zone	IT/Apparel	Gujarat	31.01.2005	
27	Dahej SEZ Ltd.	(Pertains To DC, Dahej SEZ)	Kandla Special Economic Zone	Multi-Product	Gujarat	20.12.2007	
28	Synefra Engg. & Const Ltd. (Formerly Known As Suzlon Infrastructure Ltd.)	Vadodara	Kandla Special Economic Zone	Hi-Tech Engineering Products & Related Services	Gujarat	3.7.2007	
29	Jubilant Infrastructure Ltd.	Vagra, Bharuch	Kandla Special Economic Zone	Chemicals	Gujarat	11.2.2008	
30	E Complex Pvt.Ltd.	Amreli	Kandla Special Economic Zone	Engineering Goods	Gujarat	2.1.2008	
31	Zydus Infrastructure Pvt.Ltd.	Sanand, Ahmedabad	Kandla Special Economic Zone	Pharmaceutical	Gujarat	28.9.2006	
32	Euro Multivision Pvt. Ltd.	Vill. Shikra, Tal Bhachau	Kandla Special Economic Zone	Non-Conventional Energy	Gujarat	23.4.2009	
33	Reliance Jamnagar Infrastructure Ltd.	Jamnagar	Kandla Special Economic Zone	Multi-Product	Gujarat	19.4.2006	
34	GiDC Apparel Park Ahmedabad	Ahmedabad	Kandla Special Economic Zone	Apparel	Gujarat	10.4.2007	
35	Sterling SEZ Pvt.Ltd.	(Pertains To DC, Sterling Ez)	Kandla Special Economic Zone	Multi-Product SEZ	Gujarat	1.9.2008	
36	Aqualine Properties Pvt. Ltd. Gandhinagar.	Gandhinagar	Kandla Special Economic Zone	IT/ITES	Gujarat	23.7.2008	
37	L & T Ltd. Vill Ankhol, Vadodara	Vadodara	Kandla Special Economic Zone	IT/ITES	Gujarat	18.11.2008	
38	Tata Consultancy Services Ltd, Gandhinagar.	Gandhinagar	Kandla Special Economic Zone	IT/ITES	Gujarat	30.9.2008	
39	Gift Multi Service SEZ	Gandhinagar, Gujarat	Kandla Special Economic Zone	Sector Specific, Multi Service	Gujarat	18.8.2011	
40	Electronic Park SEZ (Ehtp/IT/ITES)	Gandhinagar	Kandla Special Economic Zone	IT/ITES	Gujarat	13.12.2006	
41	Asf Insignia SEZ Pvt. Ltd. (Formerly Known As Canton Buildwell Pvt. Ltd.)	Village Gawal Pahari, Tehsil Sohna Gurgaon, Haryana	Noida Special Economic Zone	IT/ITES	Haryana	17.12.2007	
42	Gurgaon Infospace Ltd, Gurgaon	Gurgaon, Haryana	Noida Special Economic Zone	IT/ITES	Haryana	3.12.2007	
43	DLF Limited	Gurgaon, Haryana	Noida Special Economic Zone	IT/ITES	Haryana	6.12.2006	
44	DLF Cyber City, Gurgaon	Gurgaon, Haryana	Noida Special Economic Zone	IT/ITES	Haryana	13.4.2007	
45	Unitech Reality Projects Ltd.	Gurgaon, Haryana	Noida Special Economic Zone	IT/ITES	Haryana	9.1.2008	
46	Anant Raj Industries Ltd.	Sonepat, Haryana	Noida Special Economic Zone	IT/ITES	Haryana	1.9.2008	
47	Biocon Special Economic Zone	Anekal Taluk, Bengaluru, Karnataka	Cochin Special Economic Zone	Biotechnology	Karnataka	01-08-2006	
48	Synefra Special Economic Zone	Udupi Taluk, Karnataka	Cochin Special Economic Zone	Hi-Tech Engineering Products And Related Services	Karnataka	11-09-2007	
49	Manyata Embassy Business Park SEZ	Bengaluru, Karnataka	Cochin Special Economic Zone	IT/ITES	Karnataka	16-11-2006	
50	Wipro Limited (Electronic City)	Varthur Hobli, Electronic City, Bengaluru, Karnataka	Cochin Special Economic Zone	It	Karnataka	07-07-2006	
51	Wipro Limited (Sarjapur)	Varthur Hobli, Sarjapur Road, Karnataka	Cochin Special Economic Zone	It	Karnataka	07-07-2006	
52	Infosys Ltd. SEZ (Mangaluru)	Bantwal Taluk, Dakshina, Kannada Dist., Karnataka	Cochin Special Economic Zone	IT/ITES	Karnataka	22-06-2007	
53	Infosys Ltd SEZ (Mysuru)	Hebbal Industrial Area, District. Mysuru, Karnataka	Cochin Special Economic Zone	IT/ITES	Karnataka	26-04-2007	
54	Vrindavan Techvillage SEZ (Formerly M.S. Vikas Telecom Ltd)	Bengaluru, Karnataka	Cochin Special Economic Zone	IT/ITES	Karnataka	08-09-2006	
55	Rmz Ecoworld Infrastructure Pvt. Ltd. [Formerly Adarsh Prime Projects Pvt. Ltd]	Devarabeesanahalli, Bhoganahalli And Doddakanahalli, Karnataka	Cochin Special Economic Zone	IT/ITES	Karnataka	28-09-2006	
56	Divyasree Technopark	Kundalahalli, Krishnarajapuram, Karnataka	Cochin Special Economic Zone	IT/ITES Enabled Services	Karnataka	16-10-2006	
57	International Technology Park Ltd (Itpl)	Bengaluru Karnataka	Cochin Special Economic Zone	IT/ITES	Karnataka	10-04-2007	
58	Cessna SEZ	Bengaluru, Karnataka	Cochin Special Economic Zone	IT/ITES	Karnataka	16-11-2006	
59	Global Village [Formerly Tanglin SEZ]	Pattengere/Mylasandra Villages, Karnataka	Cochin Special Economic Zone	IT/ITES	Karnataka	05-10-2006	
60	Hcl Technologies Ltd.	Bengaluru District, Karnataka	Cochin Special Economic Zone	IT/ITES	Karnataka	10-04-2007	
61	Pritech Park SEZ (Primal Projects Ltd)	Bengaluru, Karnataka	Cochin Special Economic Zone	IT/ITES	Karnataka	29-08-2007	
62	Bagmane SEZ	Bengaluru North, Karnataka	Cochin Special Economic Zone	IT/ITES	Karnataka	11-07-2008	
63	Gopalan Enterprises Pvt. Ltd (Global Axis-Hoodi)	K.R. Puram, Whitefield Bengaluru, Karnataka	Cochin Special Economic Zone	IT/ITES	Karnataka	16-02-2009	
63	Karle Projects	Bengaluru District, Karnataka	Cochin Special Economic Zone	IT/ITES	Karnataka	12-12-2008	
64	Mangaluru Special Economic Zone	Karnataka	Mangaluru Special Economic Zone	Multi Product	Karnataka	06-11-2007	
65	Kochi Petrochemicals	Ernakulam District, Kerala	Cochin Special Economic Zone	Petrochemical Engineering Product	Kerala	04/08/2007	
66	Vizinjam Port of Trivandrum Sez	Thiruvananthapuram District, Kerala	Cochin Special Economic Zone	Port based Engineering Product	Kerala	29/08/2020	
67	Kochi Refineries	Ernakulam District, Kerala	Cochin Special Economic Zone	Petrochemical Engineering Product	Kerala	04/08/2007	
68	Fertilizers and Chemicals Travancore Cochin FACT Aluva	Ernakulam District, Kerala	Cochin Special Economic Zone	Chemical Engineering Product	Kerala	06/09/2005	
67	Ksidb Pharmaceutical Special Economic Zone	Alappuzha, Kerala	Cochin Special Economic Zone	Pharma	Kerala	18-12-2007	
68	Ksidb SEZ Kannur – Textiles	Kannur, Kerala	Cochin Special Economic Zone	Textile	Kerala	05-10-2006	
69	Ksidc Food Processing Special Economic Zone	Samudravalli, Turavur, Kerala	Cochin Special Economic Zone	Food Processing	Kerala	12-04-2007	
70	KAL Aerospace SEZ, Kannur	Mattanur, Kannur, Kerala	Cochin Special Economic Zone	Aerospace and Industry	Kerala	09-11-2011	
71	Keonics Adoor	Village Thengamam And Prakoode, District Pathanamthitta, Kerala	Cochin Special Economic Zone	Electronics Hardware And Software/ Ites	Kerala	04-08-2010	
72	Larsen And Toubro SEZ	Ksidc Industrial Area, Aluva District Ernakulam, Kerala	Cochin Special Economic Zone	IT/ITES	Kerala	27-09-2010	
73	Cochin Special Economic Zone	Cochin, Kerala	Cochin Special Economic Zone	Multi Product	Kerala	01.11.2000	
74	Vallarpadom SEZ	Vallarpadam, Kerala	Cochin Special Economic Zone	Port Based	Kerala	02-11-2006	
75	Kinfra Film & Video Park (Kfvp)	Trivandrum, Kerala	Cochin Special Economic Zone	Animation & Gaming changed to IT/ITES	Kerala	07-02-2012	
76	Puthuvypeen SEZ	0	Cochin Special Economic Zone	Port Based	Kerala	02-11-2006	
77	Kinfra (Food Processing) SEZ Kakkancherry	Kerala	Cochin Special Economic Zone	Food Processing	Kerala	13-06-2007	
78	Infopark	Kochi	Cochin Special Economic Zone	IT/ITES	Kerala	29-09-2006	
79	Electronic Technology Park-1	Trivandrum	Cochin Special Economic Zone	IT/ITES	Kerala	30-11-2006	
80	Electronics Technology Park-Ii (M.S Electronics Technology Parks)	Trivandrum	Cochin Special Economic Zone	IT/ITES	Kerala	13-12-2006	
81	Ksitil Kollam	Kollam	Cochin Special Economic Zone	It	Kerala	19-11-2009	
82	Electronic Technology Park-3	Trivandrum	Cochin Special Economic Zone	IT/ITES	Kerala	19-11-2009	
83	Sutherland Global Services Pvt Ltd		Cochin Special Economic Zone	IT/ITES	Kerala	12-07-2010	
84	Carborundum SEZ		Cochin Special Economic Zone	Solar Photovaltaic	Kerala	17-11-2009	
85	Ksitil (Cherthala)	Kerala	Cochin Special Economic Zone	IT/ITES	Kerala	08-06-2009	
86	Kerala Industrial Infrastructure Development Corporation (Kinfra)	Thrikkakara Village, Kanayannur Taluk, Ernakulam District, Kerala	Cochin Special Economic Zone	Electronics Industries	Kerala	13.6.2007	
87	Ksitil Calicut		Cochin Special Economic Zone	It	Kerala	27-05-2011	
88	Indore SEZ	Sector-3, Pithampur District. Dhar (Mp)	Indore Special Economic Zone	Multi Product	Madhya Pradesh	01.08.03	
89	Crystal It Park SEZ (M.P. Audoyogik Kendra Vikas Nigam (Indore) Ltd.)	Indore In The State Of Madhya Pradesh	Indore Special Economic Zone	IT/ITES Enabled Services	Madhya Pradesh	2.11.2006	
90	SEEPZ SEZ	Mumbai, Maharashtra	DC SEEPZ SEZ Mumbai	Electronics and Gems and Jewellery	Maharashtra	11-01-2000	
91	Maharashtra Airport Development Company Ltd. (Mihan SEZ )	Mihan, District Nagpur	DC SEEPZ SEZ Mumbai	Multi Product	Maharashtra	29-05-2007	
92	Serum Bio Pharma Park SEZ	212/2, Off Soil Poonawala Rod, Hadapsar, Pune	DC SEEPZ SEZ Mumbai	Biotech	Maharashtra	18-07-2006	
93	Maharashtra Industrial Development Corporation, Aurangabad	Shendre Industrial Area, District Aurangabad	DC SEEPZ SEZ Mumbai	Engineering	Maharashtra	22-12-2006	
94	Infosys Limited	Rajiv Gandhi Infotech Park, Ph.II, Village Mann, Taluka Mulashi, Pune	DC SEEPZ SEZ Mumbai	Computer / Electronic Software	Maharashtra	26-04-2007	
95	Wipro Ltd.	Maharashtra	DC SEEPZ SEZ Mumbai	Computer / Electronic Software	Maharashtra	28-12-2006	
96	Neopro Technologies Pvt.Ltd SEZ (Formerly Known As M/S. Flagship Infrastructure Pvt. Ltd.)	Hinjawadi village, Mulshi taluka, Pune	DC SEEPZ SEZ Mumbai	Computer / Electronic Software	Maharashtra	03-10-2011	
97	The Manjri Stud Farm Pvt.Ltd	S.No.209 next to Satyapuram Society Pune – Saswad Road, Phursungi, Pune	DC SEEPZ SEZ Mumbai	Computer / Electronic Software	Maharashtra	27-10-2006	
98	Syntel International Pvt Ltd	Talwade Software Park, District Pune	DC SEEPZ SEZ Mumbai	Computer / Electronic Software	Maharashtra	10-04-2007	
99	Magarpatta Township Development And Construction Company Ltd.	Magarpatta City Village Hadapsar Taaluka Haveli District Pune	DC SEEPZ SEZ Mumbai	Computer / Electronic Software	Maharashtra	20-07-2007	
100	Maharashtra Industrial Development Corporation, Hinjawadi, Pune.	Rajiv Gandhi Infotech Park, Phase III, Hinjawadi, Pune	DC SEEPZ SEZ Mumbai	Computer / Electronic Software	Maharashtra	07-06-2007	
101	Eon Kharadi Infrastructure Pvt Ltd	Taluka Haveli, District Pune	DC SEEPZ SEZ Mumbai	Computer / Electronic Software	Maharashtra	22-08-2006	
102	Pune Embassy India Pvt Ltd	Plot No.3, Rajiv Gandhi Infotech Park, Phase II, Hinjawadi, Mulshi taluka, Pune district	DC SEEPZ SEZ Mumbai	Computer / Electronic Software	Maharashtra	19-11-2007	
103	Quadron Business Park Ltd (Formerly Known As DLF Akruti Info Parks)	Plot No. 28, Rajiv Gandhi Infotech Park, MIDC, Hinjawadi, Phase II, Pune district	DC SEEPZ SEZ Mumbai	Computer / Electronic Software	Maharashtra	14-12-2007	
104	Hiranandani Business Park	Pawai, Mumbai	DC SEEPZ SEZ Mumbai	Computer / Electronic Software	Maharashtra	25-04-2008	
105	Serene Properties Pvt. Ltd	Kalwa Trans Thane Creek Industrial Area, MIDC, Dist Thane	DC SEEPZ SEZ Mumbai	Computer / Electronic Software	Maharashtra	11-02-2007	
106	Wockhardt Infrastructure Development Ltd.	Shendre Industrial Area, District Aurangabad	DC SEEPZ SEZ Mumbai	Chemicals & Pharmaceuticals	Maharashtra	17-04-2007	
107	Maharashtra Industrial Development Corporation SEZ – Nanded	Krushnoor Industrial Area, Nanded District Nanded	DC SEEPZ SEZ Mumbai	Chemicals & Pharmaceuticals	Maharashtra	11-01-2013	
108	Khed Economic Infrastructure Pvt. Ltd.	Kanhersar Taluka Khed, District Pune, Maharashtra.	DC SEEPZ SEZ Mumbai	Engineering & Electronics	Maharashtra	4.8.2010	
109	Wardha Power Company Ltd.	Wardha Growth Center, District Chandrapur	DC SEEPZ SEZ Mumbai	Power	Maharashtra	03-09-2008	
110	M/S. Arshiya International Ltd.	Village Sai, Taluka Panvel, District Raigad	DC SEEPZ SEZ Mumbai	Trading	Maharashtra	04-05-2009	
111	Gigaplex Estate Private Limited	Gigaoplex, Plot No.05, MIDC Knowledge Park, Airoli, Navi Mumbai	DC SEEPZ SEZ Mumbai	Computer / Electronic Software	Maharashtra	06-11-2013	
112	Maharashtra Industrial Development Carporetion, Kesurdi Satara	Kesurde Taluka Khandala, District Satara	DC SEEPZ SEZ Mumbai	Engineering	Maharashtra	22-05-2009	
113	Maharashtra Industrial Development CorporationSEZ, Phaltan, District Satara	MIDC Phalten, District Satara	DC SEEPZ SEZ Mumbai	Engineering	Maharashtra	04-08-2010	
114	Sunstream City Pvt. Ltd (Formerly)	Village Mulund, Taluka Kurla, Dist. Mumbai Suburban And Village Kopari, Taluka Thane, Dist Thane	DC SEEPZ SEZ Mumbai	IT/ITES	Maharashtra	22-04-2013	
115	Orissa Industries Dev. Cor. It SEZ	Bhubaneswar	Falta Special Economic Zone	IT/ITES	Odisha	18.5.2007	
116	Vedanta Aluminium Limited	Brundamal And Kurebaga Villages, Tehsil and District – Jharsuguda, Orissa.	Falta Special Economic Zone	Manufacture And Export Of Aluminium	Odisha	27.2.2009	
117	Ranbaxy Laboratories Ltd.	Plot No. A-41, Focal Point, Mohali, Punjab	Noida Special Economic Zone	Pharmaceuticals	Punjab	10.4.2007	
118	Quarkcity India Pvt. Ltd.	Mohali	Noida Special Economic Zone	IT/ITES	Punjab	2.11.2006	
119	Jaipur SEZ	Jaipur, Rajasthan	Noida Special Economic Zone	Gems And Jewellery	Rajasthan	1.7.2003	
120	Mahindra World City (Jaipur) Ltd.	Jaipur, Rajasthan	Noida Special Economic Zone	Handicraft	Rajasthan	6.1.2009	
121	Mahindra World City (Jaipur) Ltd.	Jaipur, Rajasthan	Noida Special Economic Zone	Engineering And Related Industries	Rajasthan	6.1.2009	
122	Mahindra World City (Jaipur) Ltd.	Kalwara Village, Jaipur, Rajasthan	Noida Special Economic Zone	IT/ITES	Rajasthan	10.4.2007	
123	MEPZ Special Economic Zone	Chennai	MEPZ Special Economic Zone	Multiproduct	Tamil Nadu	1.1.2003	
124	L & T Shipbuilding	Kattupalli	MEPZ Special Economic Zone	Engg	Tamil Nadu	04.12.2009	
125	Mahindra	Chengleput	MEPZ Special Economic Zone	It / Hardware / Bio – Inform	Tamil Nadu	26.10.2004	
126	Nokia	Sriperumbudur	MEPZ Special Economic Zone	Telecomm Equipments	Tamil Nadu	17.08.2005	
127	Flextronics Technologies (India) Private Limited	Sriperumbudur	MEPZ Special Economic Zone	Elec.Hardware	Tamil Nadu	25.04.2006	
128	Cheyyar SEZ	Cheyyar	MEPZ Special Economic Zone	Footwear	Tamil Nadu	13.04.2007	
129	Synefra Construction Ltd. (Suzlon Infrastructure Ltd.)	Coimbatore	MEPZ Special Economic Zone	Engg	Tamil Nadu	10.08.2007	
130	AMRL SEZ	Nanguneri Taluk, Tirunelvelli District	MEPZ Special Economic Zone	Multi Prod	Tamil Nadu	18.11.2008	
131	Pearl City Cccl	Tuticorin	MEPZ Special Economic Zone	Food Pro	Tamil Nadu	23.04.2009	
132	Sipcot	Oragadam	MEPZ Special Economic Zone	Elec.Hardware	Tamil Nadu	18.10.2007	
133	Sipcot Hi-Tech	Sriperumbudur	MEPZ Special Economic Zone	Elect.Hardware	Tamil Nadu	22.12.2006	
134	Sipcot	Ranipet	MEPZ Special Economic Zone	Engg	Tamil Nadu	27.11.2007	
135	Sipcot	Gangaikondan	MEPZ Special Economic Zone	Transport	Tamil Nadu	15.05.2008	
136	Sipcot	Perundurai	MEPZ Special Economic Zone	Engg	Tamil Nadu	23.04.2008	
137	New Chennai	Cheyyur	MEPZ Special Economic Zone	Engg	Tamil Nadu	28.09.2007	
138	New Chennai	Cheyyur	MEPZ Special Economic Zone	Multi Services	Tamil Nadu	23.11.2007	
139	J. Matadee	Mannur Vill	MEPZ Special Economic Zone	Ftwz	Tamil Nadu	10.03.2008	
140	Mahindra	Chengleput	MEPZ Special Economic Zone	Apparel & Fashions	Tamil Nadu	26.10.2004	
141	Mahindra	Chengleput	MEPZ Special Economic Zone	Auto Ancillaries	Tamil Nadu	26.10.2004	
142	TCS	Siruseri	MEPZ Special Economic Zone	IT/ITES	Tamil Nadu	17.07.2006	
143	Syntel	Siruseri	MEPZ Special Economic Zone	IT/ITES	Tamil Nadu	11.08.2006	
144	Ig3 Infra Limited (Etl Infrastructure Services Limited)	Thoraipakkam	MEPZ Special Economic Zone	IT/ITES	Tamil Nadu	11.08.2006	
145	Hexaware Technologies Limited	Siruseri	MEPZ Special Economic Zone	IT/ITES	Tamil Nadu	31.08.2006	
146	Shriram Properties And Infrastructure Private Limited	Chennai	MEPZ Special Economic Zone	IT/ITES	Tamil Nadu	28.09.2006	
147	Chil	Coimbatore	MEPZ Special Economic Zone	IT/ITES	Tamil Nadu	09.11.2006	
148	DLF Info City	Porur	MEPZ Special Economic Zone	IT/ITES	Tamil Nadu	16.11.2006	
149	Elcot	Sholinganallur	MEPZ Special Economic Zone	IT/ITES	Tamil Nadu	11.04.2007	
150	Elcot	Coimbatore	MEPZ Special Economic Zone	IT/ITES	Tamil Nadu	11.04.2007	
151	TIDEL Park Salem	Salem	Salem Special Economic Zone	IT/ITES	Tamil Nadu	11.04.2007	
152	Estintia It Park Formerly Known As (L & T Arun Ecello)	Chennai	MEPZ Special Economic Zone	IT/ITES	Tamil Nadu	01.05.2007	
153	Span Ventures	Coimbatore	MEPZ Special Economic Zone	IT/ITES	Tamil Nadu	10.07.2007	
154	Eta Techno	Navalur	MEPZ Special Economic Zone	IT/ITES	Tamil Nadu	07.09.2007	
155	Elcot	Trichy	MEPZ Special Economic Zone	IT/ITES	Tamil Nadu	12.02.2008	
156	Cognizant	Siruseri	MEPZ Special Economic Zone	IT/ITES	Tamil Nadu	17.12.2007	
157	Elcot, Ilandhakulam	Ilanthakullam	MEPZ Special Economic Zone	IT/ITES	Tamil Nadu	09.06.2008	
158	Tril Info Park	Tarama	MEPZ Special Economic Zone	IT/ITES	Tamil Nadu	23.01.2009	
159	Ig3 Infra Ltd	Uthukuli	MEPZ Special Economic Zone	Textile	Tamil Nadu	30.04.2008	
160	Nsl SEZ, Uppal	Uppal	Vishakhapatnam Special Economic Zone	IT/ITES	Telangana	18.05.2007	
161	DLF Commercial Developers Ltd, Gachibowli	Gachibowli	Vishakhapatnam Special Economic Zone	IT/ITES	Telangana	26.04.2007	
162	APIIC Ltd – Nanakramguda	Nanakramguda	Vishakhapatnam Special Economic Zone	IT/ITES	Telangana	25.07.2007	
163	Wipro Limited, Gopannapally	Gopannapally	Vishakhapatnam Special Economic Zone	IT/ITES	Telangana	07.12.2007	
164	Sundew Properties, Madhapur	Madhapur	Vishakhapatnam Special Economic Zone	IT/ITES	Telangana	16.10.2006	
165	Stargaze Properties Pvt Ltd, Rr Dist	Rr District	Vishakhapatnam Special Economic Zone	IT/ITES	Telangana	01.06.2007	
166	Serene Properties, Ghatkesar	Ghatkesar	Vishakhapatnam Special Economic Zone	IT/ITES	Telangana	01.06.2007	
167	Jt Holdings Pvt Ltd, Rr Dist.	Rr District	Vishakhapatnam Special Economic Zone	IT/ITES	Telangana	18.05.2007	
168	Divyasree Nsl, Raidurga	Raidurga, Gachchibowli	Vishakhapatnam Special Economic Zone	IT/ITES	Telangana	18.05.2007	
169	Infosys Tech, Pocharam	Pocharam	Vishakhapatnam Special Economic Zone	IT/ITES	Telangana	01.08.2006	
170	Cmc Limited, Gachibowli	Gachibowli	Vishakhapatnam Special Economic Zone	IT/ITES	Telangana	05.12.2006	
171	Phoenix Infoparks Pvt Ltd, Gachibowli	Gachibowli	Vishakhapatnam Special Economic Zone	IT/ITES	Telangana	11.08.2006	
172	Hyderabad Gems SEZ Ltd, Rr Dist	Rr District	Vishakhapatnam Special Economic Zone	Gems & Jewellery	Telangana	14.08.2006	
173	M/S Gmr Hyderabad Aviation SEZ Limited, Hyderabad	Village Mamidipalli, Rr District	Vishakhapatnam Special Economic Zone	Aviation Sector	Telangana	20.10.2009	
174	Fab City Spv (India) Pvt Ltd, Rr Dist	Rr District	Vishakhapatnam Special Economic Zone	Semiconductors	Telangana	15.01.2007	
175	M/S. Apiic Ltd., Adibatla, Ibrahim Patnam, R .R. Dist,	Ranga Reddy District, Ap	Vishakhapatnam Special Economic Zone	Aerospace Engineering Industries	Telangana	24.12.2008	
176	Apiic Pharma SEZ – JeDCherla	JeDCherla	Vishakhapatnam Special Economic Zone	Pharmaceuticals	Telangana	13.06.2007	
177	Tech Mahindra Limited (Satyam Computers), Bahadurpally	Bahadurpally	Vishakhapatnam Special Economic Zone	IT/ITES	Telangana	25.06.2007	
178	Tech Mahindra Limited (Satyam Computers), Madhapur	Madhapur	Vishakhapatnam Special Economic Zone	IT/ITES	Telangana	20.6.2006	
179	Maytas Enterprises SEZ Pvt Ltd, Gopannpally	Gopannpally	Vishakhapatnam Special Economic Zone	IT/ITES	Telangana	20.04.2007	
180	Indu Techzone Pvt Ltd, Mamidipally	Mamidipally	Vishakhapatnam Special Economic Zone	IT/ITES	Telangana	10.04.2007	
181	Lanco Hills Technology, Manikonda	Manikonda	Vishakhapatnam Special Economic Zone	IT/ITES	Telangana	04.10.2007	
182	Wipro Limited, Manikonda	Manikonda	Vishakhapatnam Special Economic Zone	IT/ITES	Telangana	01.08.2006	
183	TCSl Ltd, Adibatla	Adibatla(Developer)	Vishakhapatnam Special Economic Zone	IT/ITES	Telangana	05.02.2011	
184	Navayuga Legala Estates Pvt Ltd, Serilingampally	Serilingampally	Vishakhapatnam Special Economic Zone	IT/ITES	Telangana	20.09.2007	
185	Apiic Ltd	Shameerpet Rr District	Vishakhapatnam Special Economic Zone	Biotech	Telangana	20.10.2009	
186	OMICS International	Chandanagar-Ameenpur Medak District	Vishakhapatnam Special Economic Zone	IT/ITES	Telangana	28.03.2017	
187	Noida Special Economic Zone	Uttar Pradesh	Noida Special Economic Zone	Multi Product	Uttar Pradesh	1.1.2003	
187	Moradabad SEZ	Moradabadup	Noida Special Economic Zone	Handicrafts	Uttar Pradesh	30.9.2003	
189	Moser Baer SEZ, Greater Noida	Greater Noida	Noida Special Economic Zone	Non-Conventional Energy Including Solar Energy Equipments/ Cell	Uttar Pradesh	19.05.2007	
190	Aachvis Softech Pvt. Ltd.	Sector-135, Noida, Uttar Pradesh	Noida Special Economic Zone	IT/ITES	Uttar Pradesh	15.5.2010	
191	Hcl Technologies	Noida	Noida Special Economic Zone	IT/ITES	Uttar Pradesh	15.12.2006	
192	Wipro Ltd.	Greater Noida	Noida Special Economic Zone	IT/ITES	Uttar Pradesh	18.6.2007	
193	Niit Technologies Limited SEZ	Plot No.Tz-02, Sector-Tech Zone, Ites Park, Greater Noida, Up	Noida Special Economic Zone	IT/ITES	Uttar Pradesh	29.5.2007	
194	Ansal It City And Parks Limited	Gr. Noida	Noida Special Economic Zone	IT/ITES	Uttar Pradesh	29.8.2006	
195	Seaview Developers Limited	Sector-135, Noida, Uttar Pradesh	Noida Special Economic Zone	IT/ITES	Uttar Pradesh	12.7.2007	
196	Arshiya Northern Ftwz Limited	Khurja, Bulandshahr, Uttar Pradesh	Noida Special Economic Zone	Ftwz	Uttar Pradesh	16.11.2010	
197	Artha Infratech Pvt. Ltd.	Plot No.-21, Sec-Techzone -Iv, Gr. Noida	Noida Special Economic Zone	IT/ITES	Uttar Pradesh	11.05.2011	
198	Falta Special Economic Zone	Falta, West Bengal	Falta Special Economic Zone	Multi Product	West Bengal	1.1.2003	
199	Manikanchan SEZ, W. Bengal	Kolkata, West Bengal	Falta Special Economic Zone	Gems & Jewelry	West Bengal	12.06.2003	
200	Salt Lake Electronic City – Wipro, West Bengal	Kolkata, West Bengal	Falta Special Economic Zone	IT/ITES	West Bengal	12.8.2005	
201	M.L. Dalmiya & Co Ltd.	Kolkata	Falta Special Economic Zone	IT/ITES	West Bengal	3.4.2006	
202	Unitech Hi-Tech Structures Ltd.	Rajarhat, Kolkata, West Bengal	Falta Special Economic Zone	IT/ITES	West Bengal	7.2.2008	
203	Tata Consultancy Services Limited	Rajarhat, Kolkata, West Bengal	Falta Special Economic Zone	IT/ITES	West Bengal	26.5.2008	
204	DLF Limited	Rajarhat, Kolkata, West Bengal	Falta Special Economic Zone	IT/ITES	West Bengal	3.8.2010	
205	OSV FTWZ	Mumbai (JNPT), Chennai, Delhi NCR (Noida), Hyderabad, Mundra (Gujarat), Kolkata	Noida Special Economic Zone	FTWZ	Multi-State	11.8.2017	
206	Astromar Free Zone	Chennai, Tamilnadu	MEPZ Special Economic Zone	FTWZ	TAMILNADU	1.5.2018	

== SEZs set up by the Government of India ==
- Kandla Special Economic Zone (KASEZ) — Located at Kandla, Gandhidham, Gujarat; established by the Government of India.
- SEEPZ Special Economic Zone — Situated in Mumbai, Maharashtra; primarily focused on electronics and gems and jewellery.
- Noida Special Economic Zone — Located in Uttar Pradesh; designated as a multi-product zone.
- MEPZ Special Economic Zone — Situated in Chennai, Tamil Nadu; designated as a multi-product zone.
- Cochin Special Economic Zone — Located in Kochi, Kerala; designated as a multi-product zone.
- Falta Special Economic Zone — Situated in Falta, West Bengal; designated as a multi-product zone.
- Visakhapatnam Special Economic Zone — Located in Visakhapatnam, Andhra Pradesh; designated as a multi-product zone.

== State Government/Private SEZs notified or approved prior to the SEZ Act, 2005 ==
- Fazalganj Industrial Estate, Kanpur, Uttar Pradesh — Acids, chemicals, and petrochemicals.
- Surat Special Economic Zone, Surat, Gujarat — Multi-product.
- Manikanchan SEZ, Kolkata, West Bengal — Gems and jewellery.
- Jaipur SEZ, Jaipur, Rajasthan — Gems and jewellery.
- Indore SEZ, Sector-III, Pithampur, District Dhar, Madhya Pradesh — Multi-product.
- Jodhpur SEZ, Jodhpur, Rajasthan — Handicrafts.
- Banthar Leather Technology Park, Unnao (Kanpur Metropolitan Region), Uttar Pradesh — Leather.
- Salt Lake Electronic City (Wipro), Kolkata, West Bengal — Software development and IT-enabled services (ITES).
- Mahindra City SEZ (IT), Tamil Nadu — IT, hardware, and bioinformatics.
- Mahindra City SEZ (Auto Ancillary), Tamil Nadu — Automotive.
- Ruma Textile Park, Kanpur, Uttar Pradesh — Textiles.
- Infovalley, Gaudakasipur, Bhubaneswar, Odisha — IT/ITES.
- Mahindra City SEZ (Textiles), Tamil Nadu — Apparel and fashion accessories.
- Nokia SEZ, Sriperumbudur, Tamil Nadu — Telecom equipment and R&D services.
- Moradabad SEZ, Moradabad, Uttar Pradesh — Handicrafts.
- Surat Apparel Park, Surat, Gujarat — IT and textiles.
- Rasi Egg Centre (Agri & Allied), Namakkal, Tamil Nadu — Agriculture and allied activities.
- Infocity SEZ, Chandaka, Bhubaneswar Odisha — IT.

== Notified operational Special Economic Zones ==
=== Andhra Pradesh ===
- Visakhapatnam Special Economic Zone (VSEZ), Duvvada, Visakhapatnam — Multi-product.
- APIIC SEZ, Atchutapuram, Visakhapatnam — Multi-product.
- APIIC SEZ, Madhurawada, Visakhapatnam — IT/ITES.
- APIIC SEZ, Kapulauppada, Visakhapatnam — IT/ITES.
- APIIC SEZ, Gambheeram, Visakhapatnam — IT/ITES.
- APIIC SEZ, Rajayyapeta, Visakhapatnam — Petroleum, oil and gas industry.
- APIIC SEZ, Gurrampalem, Visakhapatnam — Multi-product.
- Brandix India Apparel City Private Limited, Achutapuram, Visakhapatnam — Textiles.
- Jawaharlal Nehru Pharma City (Ramky Pharma City Pvt. Ltd.), Parawada, Visakhapatnam — Pharmaceuticals.
- Divi's Laboratories Limited, Chippada village, Visakhapatnam — Pharmaceuticals.
- Andhra Pradesh Industrial Infrastructure Corporation Limited SEZ, Sarpavaram village, Kakinada Rural, East Godavari district — IT/ITES.
- Kakinada SEZ Private Limited, Ramanakkapeta and A. V. Nagaram villages, East Godavari district, Kakinada — Multi-product.
- Apache SEZ Development India Private Limited, Tada mandal, Nellore district — Footwear and related industries.
- Parry Infrastructure Company Private Limited, Vakalapudi village, Kakinada Rural mandal, Kakinada — Food processing.
- Sri City SEZ, Chittoor district — Multi-product and domestic tariff zone (DTZ).

=== Chandigarh ===
- Rajiv Gandhi Technology Park, Chandigarh — IT/ITES.

=== Gujarat ===
- Million Minds Tech City IT SEZ, by Ganesh Housing Corporation Limited, Ahmedabad — IT/ITES.
- Kandla SEZ (KASEZ), Gandhidham — Multi-product.
- DGDC SEZ, Surat (SURSEZ) — Multi-product.
- GIDC Ahmedabad Apparel Park SEZ, Ahmedabad — Apparel.
- GIDC Electronic Park, Gandhinagar — Electronics.
- Mundra Port and Special Economic Zone, Mundra — Multi-product.
- Synefra Engineering and Construction Ltd., Vadodara — Hi-tech engineering products and related services.
- Reliance Jamnagar Infrastructure Ltd., Jamnagar — Multi-product.
- Zydus Infrastructure Pvt. Ltd., Sanand, Ahmedabad — Pharmaceuticals.
- Larsen & Toubro Ltd. IT/ITES SEZ, Surat — IT/ITES.
- Calica Group's "3rd Eye Voice" IT/ITES SEZ, Ahmedabad — IT/ITES.
- Gallops Engineering SEZ, Moraiya, near Changodar, Ahmedabad — Engineering products.
- Vatva SEZ, Ahmedabad — Multi-product.
- Infocity IT Park SEZ, Gandhinagar — IT/ITES.
- GIFT SEZ, GIFT City, Gandhinagar — Multi-services, including finance and IT/ITES.
- Dahej SEZ 1 and 2, Tal Vagra, Bharuch — Multi-product.
- TCS Garima Park IT/ITES SEZ, Gandhinagar — IT/ITES.
- Surat SEZ, Surat — Multi-product.
- Surat Apparel Park SEZ, Surat — Apparel and textiles.
- Sterling SEZ & Infrastructure Ltd., Gujarat — Multi-product.
- K Raheja Corp IT/ITES SEZ, Koba, Gandhinagar — IT/ITES.

Sr.No.	Estate	District	Size in Ha.	Power Supply (MVA)	Water Supply (MLD)	Drainage (MLD)
1	Sanand (Mini)	Ahmedabad	1.80	0.50	2.70	0.00
2	Vani	Ahmedabad	2.00	2.00	0.20	0.00
3	Vatwa- Zone 'D'	Ahmedabad	6.30	2.00	0.43	0.00
4	Dhandhuka	Ahmedabad	23.00	1.00	0.01	0.00
5	Dholka	Ahmedabad	42.00	2.20	0.20	0.00
6	Viramgam	Ahmedabad	42.00	5.00	1.24	0.00
7	Kerala	Ahmedabad	97.30	9.50	1.13	0.00
8	Kathawada I & II	Ahmedabad	62.00	2.00	4.54	0.00
9	Odhav	Ahmedabad	117.60	7.80	17.03	11.80
10	Naroda	Ahmedabad	347.92	15.80	19.04	5.90
11	Vatwa	Ahmedabad	527.00	23.00	22.25	7.26
12	Sankheda	Vadodara	0.80	0.50	0.00	0.00
13	Pavi-jetpur	Vadodara	0.90	-	-	-
14	GTC Ltd.	Vadodara	7.75	-	-	-
15	Dabhoi	Vadodara	10.91	1.50	0.00	0.00
16	Ranoli	Vadodara	31.08	3.00	0.40	0.00
17	Limbda (Appolo Tyre)	Vadodara	51.71	-	-	-
18	Por-Ramangamdi	Vadodara	134.28	9.00	4.53	0.00
19	Nandesari	Vadodara	197.20	15.00	10.07	5.45
20	Makarpura	Vadodara	324.50	18.20	0.00	0.00
21	Vaghodia	Vadodara	369.04	10.76	4.54	0.00
22	P.C.C.	Vadodara	721.60	125.00	0.00	0.00
23	Savli	Vadodara	544.00	50.00	3.50	0.00
24	Thasra	Kheda	8.10	2.50	0.54	0.00
25	Kapadwanj	Kheda	10.80	0.50	0.00	0.00
26	Matar	Kheda	0.00	-	-	-
27	Nadiad-I	Kheda	29.20	2.00	3.62	0.50
28	Nadiad- II	Kheda	0.08	-	-	-
29	Balasinor	Kheda	22.80	1.50	0.00	0.00
30	Sojitra	Anand	8.80	1.00	1.82	0.00
31	Umreth	Anand	10.70	0.50	0.54	0.00
32	Petlad	Anand	11.40	1.50	0.00	0.00
33	Borsad	Anand	16.30	2.00	0.86	0.00
34	Khambat	Anand	37.83	2.50	0.55	0.00
35	V.U. Nagar	Anand	228.00	5.50	3.67	0.00
36	Bhat	Gandhinagar	26.00	0.00	0.08	0.00
37	Gandhinagar-I	Gandhinagar	30.30	3.80	6.81	4.54
38	Gandhinagar-II	Gandhinagar	234.00	7.50	0.00	0.00
39	Dehgam	Gandhinagar	17.30	2.00	0.46	0.00
40	Mansa	Gandhinagar	16.71	1.50	1.20	0.00
41	Ranasan	Gandhinagar	39.94	3.00	0.18	0.00
42	Gozaria	Gandhinagar	64.00	0.60	0.19	0.00
43	Pardi	Valsad	22.70	1.00	0.61	0.00
44	Dharampur-II	Valsad	35.47	-	-	-
45	Bhilad	Valsad	63.38	-	-	-
46	Valsad	Valsad	95.00	5.30	1.50	0.00
47	Umargam	Valsad	336.00	18.50	4.50	0.00
48	Sarigam	Valsad	286.50	15.60	40.86	12.71
49	Vapi	Valsad	1026.00	42.00	95.20	79.90
50	Unai	Navsari	2.00	0.00	0.00	0.00
51	Bilimora	Navsari	44.90	2.50	0.91	0.00
52	Navsari	Navsari	50.00	3.50	2.50	0.00
53	Dhrol	Jamnagar	1.00	-	-	-
54	Bhatia	Jamnagar	1.00	-	-	-
55	Bhanvad	Jamnagar	0.00	-	-	-
56	Jamkhambhalia	Jamnagar	7.97	0.25	0.03	0.00
57	Arambhada	Jamnagar	22.20	0.75	0.78	0.00
58	Jamnagar-I	Jamnagar	56.40	9.70	0.00	0.00
59	Jamnagar-II	Jamnagar	99.90	2.40	0.78	0.00
60	Kotda-Sangani	Rajkot	0.89	-	-	-
61	Paddhari	Rajkot	1.00	-	-	-
62	Malia	Rajkot	0.00	-	-	-
63	Jasdan	Rajkot	6.58	2.00	0.06	0.00
64	Bhaktinagar	Rajkot	8.80	2.00	0.05	0.02
65	Jetpur	Rajkot	10.10	0.30	0.60	0.00
66	Wankaner	Rajkot	19.70	2.00	0.09	0.00
67	Morbi	Rajkot	8.50	2.30	0.13	0.00
68	Dhoraji	Rajkot	0.00	-	-	-
69	Gondal-I	Rajkot	13.20	2.00	0.13	0.00
70	Gondal-II	Rajkot	32.71	-	-	-
71	Rafaleshwar	Rajkot	30.61	2.00	0.01	0.00
72	Kuvadawa	Rajkot	50.60	-	-	-
73	Aji	Rajkot	83.31	5.30	1.10	0.00
74	Lodhika	Rajkot	400.52	8.00	0.05	0.00
75	Valod	Surat	1.13	-	-	-
76	Khatodara	Surat	3.07	1.00	0.00	0.00
77	Bardoli	Surat	4.70	0.50	0.06	0.00
78	Nizar	Surat	0.00	-	-	-
79	Olpad	Surat	29.65	1.00	0.03	0.00
80	Katargam	Surat	38.00	7.60	0.87	0.00
81	Doswada	Surat	165.62	-	-	-
82	Pandesara	Surat	217.20	11.90	11.35	11.35
83	Hazira (Mora)	Surat	474.51	-	-	-
84	Sachin	Surat	692.30	31.00	5.80	40.00
85	Ichchapore (GIDC-SUDA)	Surat	910.43	-	-	-
86	Jafrabad	Amreli	1.00	-	-	-
87	Liliya	Amreli	1.00	-	-	-
88	Rajula	Amreli	3.92	-	-	-
89	Babra (Dimond)	Amreli	10.00	-	-	-
90	Damnagar	Amreli	10.44	0.10	0.05	0.00
91	Amreli	Amreli	14.15	1.00	0.50	0.00
92	Babra(G)	Amreli	15.85	-	-	-
93	Vallabhipur	Bhavnagar	0.00	-	-	-
94	Dhasa	Bhavnagar	0.50	-	-	-
95	Botad	Bhavnagar	6.00	-	-	-
96	Vitthalwadi	Bhavnagar	9.13	2.40	0.15	0.00
97	Shihor-I	Bhavnagar	12.45	2.00	0.00	0.00
98	Palitana	Bhavnagar	14.14	-	-	-
99	Mahuva	Bhavnagar	16.81	1.50	0.00	0.00
100	Shihor-II	Bhavnagar	18.70	2.00	0.30	0.00
101	Vertej	Bhavnagar	28.45	3.73	0.18	0.00
102	Alang	Bhavnagar	0.00	0.50	0.00	0.00
103	Chitra	Bhavnagar	173.48	10.00	1.36	0.00
104	Sihori	Banaskantha	1.64	-	-	-
105	Ambaji	Banaskantha	6.54	0.75	0.30	0.00
106	Palanpur	Banaskantha	7.58	1.00	1.36	0.00
107	Deesa	Banaskantha	12.78	2.00	1.25	0.00
108	Radhanpur	Banaskantha	0.00	0.00	0.60	0.00
109	Chandisar	Banaskantha	64.58	2.00	1.00	0.00
110	Mundra	Kutch	1.33	0.50	0.10	0.00
111	Madhapur	Kutch	2.12	0.50	0.00	0.00
112	Anjar	Kutch	10.00	2.00	0.13	0.01
113	Gandhidham-I	Kutch	10.61	0.50	0.00	0.00
114	Bhuj	Kutch	18.99	2.00	0.36	0.00
115	Mandvi	Kutch	19.94	1.00	0.35	0.00
116	Vagra	Bharuch	0.00	-	-	-
117	Jambusar	Bharuch	2.20	-	-	-
118	Hansot	Bharuch	0.00	-	-	-
119	Panoli	Bharuch	0.00	-	-	-
120	Nabipur	Bharuch	13.26	-	-	-
121	Dungari	Bharuch	0.00	-	-	-
122	Valia (Dodwada)	Bharuch	32.15	-	-	-
123	Valia (Water)	Bharuch	40.84	-	-	-
124	Naldhari	Bharuch	0.00	-	-	-
125	Kanerao	Bharuch	0.00	-	-	-
126	Bharuch	Bharuch	83.50	6.80	4.54	0.00
127	Valia (Kondh)	Bharuch	92.60	-	-	-
128	Dahej (GACL)	Bharuch	106.00	-	-	-
129	Atali-Kaladra (Hsg)	Bharuch	0.00	-	-	-
130	Palej	Bharuch	155.20	5.31	2.00	0.00
131	Valia	Bharuch	206.00	-	-	-
132	Vagra (IPCL)	Bharuch	0.00	-	-	-
133	Vagra (Chem)-Vilayat	Bharuch	1029.00	2.00	36.32	0.00
134	Panoli	Bharuch	930.44	14.50	36.05	20.00
135	Ankleshwar	Bharuch	1259.90	62.00	72.67	53.22
136	Jagadia (Chem)	Bharuch	1600.00	100.00	45.00	50.00
137	Dahej	Bharuch	2174.86	50.00	0.00	0.00
138	Tilakwada	Narmada	10.35	-	-	-
139	Sagbara	Narmada	1.50	-	-	-
140	Dediapada	Narmada	2.39	-	-	-
141	Rajpipla-II	Narmada	13.85	0.50	0.12	0.00
142	Rajpipla-I	Narmada	9.50	-	-	-
143	Visavadar	Junagadh	1.00	-	-	-
144	Sil	Junagadh	0.00	-	-	-
145	Junagadh-I	Junagadh	14.28	4.00	0.11	0.00
146	Veraval	Junagadh	54.10	5.00	0.45	0.00
147	Junagadh-II	Junagadh	84.81	2.50	0.60	0.00
148	Sutrapada	Junagadh	160.11	-	-	-
149	Porbandar	Porbandar	193.20	15.00	0.78	0.00
150	Miyani	Porbandar	0.00	-	-	-
151	Sayla	Surendranagar	1.00	0.50	0.00	0.00
152	Chotila-I	Surendranagar	1.60	0.00	0.00	0.00
153	Lakhtar	Surendranagar	0.00	-	-	-
154	Halvad	Surendranagar	10.00	2.00	0.00	0.00
155	Thangadh	Surendranagar	10.08	1.50	0.00	0.00
156	Dhangadhra	Surendranagar	13.14	1.50	0.00	0.00
157	Limbdi	Surendranagar	19.62	1.50	0.00	0.00
158	Bamanbore	Surendranagar	41.06	1.00	0.10	0.00
159	Surendranagar	Surendranagar	156.03	7.00	0.00	0.00
160	Kukarwada	Mehsana	7.24	2.00	0.26	0.00
161	Balisana	Mehsana	8.28	2.00	0.30	0.00
162	Kheralu	Mehsana	13.36	2.00	0.30	0.00
163	Visnagar	Mehsana	14.60	2.00	2.00	0.00
164	Vijapur	Mehsana	0.00	-	-	-
165	Mehsana-I	Mehsana	46.55	5.25	1.55	0.00
166	Kalol	Mehsana	55.30	4.50	3.41	0.00
167	Kadi	Mehsana	83.90	4.90	2.80	0.00
168	IFFCO	Mehsana	112.04	0.00	36.15	0.00
169	Mehsana-II	Mehsana	120.36	2.00	2.10	0.00
170	Chhatral	Mehsana	187.90	9.00	3.63	0.00
171	Patan	Patan	6.03	0.30	0.00	0.00
172	Chanasma	Patan	18.73	2.10	0.54	0.00
173	Lanva	Patan	22.81	0.00	0.13	0.00
174	Sidhpur	Patan	0.00	-	-	-
175	Jambughoda	Godhra	1.14	-	-	-
176	Shahera	Godhra	0.00	-	-	-
177	Godhra	Godhra	19.63	2.00	1.24	0.00
178	Kalol	Godhra	71.08	5.50	0.56	0.00
179	Halol	Godhra	175.20	7.80	1.45	0.00
180	Dahod	Dahod	3.90	-	-	-
181	Dahod- II	Dahod	30.00	1.00	0.00	0.00
182	Devgadhbaria	Dahod	6.07	-	-	-
183	Malpur	Sabarkantha	1.00	0.00	0.05	0.00
184	Idar	Sabarkantha	2.60	0.50	0.25	0.00
185	Modasa	Sabarkantha	10.00	1.50	0.52	0.00
186	Himatnagar	Sabarkantha	25.37	2.20	0.76	0.00
187	Talod	Sabarkantha	21.07	2.00	0.36	0.00
188	Pimpri	Dang	0.00	0.00	-	-
TOTAL	-	-	19908.36	898.70	545.42	302.66

=== Haryana ===
- ASF Insignia, Gwal Pahari, Gurgaon — IT/ITES
- DLF Cyber City, Gurgaon — IT/ITES
- DLF Limited SEZ, Gurgaon — IT/ITES
- Gurgaon Infospace Ltd SEZ, Gurgaon — IT/ITES
- Keystone Knowledge Park, Gurgaon — Multi-sector SEZ.
- Reliance Haryana SEZ Limited, Gurgaon — Multi-product SEZ.
- Candor TechSpace, Sector 48, Gurgaon — IT/ITES.

=== Karnataka ===
- International Tech Park, Bengaluru — IT/ITES.
- Manyata Embassy Business Park, Bengaluru — IT/ITES.
- Wipro Limited, Doddakannelli village, Varthur Hobli, Electronic City, Bengaluru — IT.
- Wipro Limited (Sarjapur Road campus), Doddakannelli village, Varthur Hobli, Sarjapur Road, Bengaluru — IT.
- Infosys Technologies SEZ, Mangaluru and Bengaluru, Karnataka — IT/ITES.
- Vikas Telecom Limited, Bengaluru — IT/ITES.
- Adarsh Prime Projects Private Limited, Devarabeesanahalli, Bhoganahalli and Doddakanahalli, Bengaluru — IT/ITES.
- Divyasree (Shyamaraju) SEZ, Kundalahalli, Krishnarajapuram, Bengaluru — IT/ITES.
- Cessna Garden Developers Pvt. Ltd., Bengaluru — IT/ITES
- Global Village Tech Park, Mylasandra village, Bengaluru — IT/ITES.
- Biocon Limited, Anekal Taluk, Bengaluru — Biotechnology.
- KIADB SEZ, Hassan — Textile.
- Primal Projects Private Limited, Bengaluru — IT/ITES.
- Pritech Park SEZ, Bellandur, Bengaluru — IT/ITES.
- Synefra Engineering and Construction Ltd., Karnataka — Hi-tech engineering products and related services.
- Bagmane Construction Pvt. Ltd., Bengaluru — IT/ITES.
- Aequs SEZ (formerly QuEST Global SEZ Pvt. Ltd.), Belagavi — Aerospace and IT/BT.

=== Kerala ===
- KINFRA Film and Video Park, Thiruvananthapuram — IT/ITES.
- Electronic Technology Park (SEZ 1), Thiruvananthapuram — IT/ITES.
- Technopark, Kollam — IT/ITES.
- Cochin Special Economic Zone, Kochi — Multi-product.
- Infopark, Kochi — IT/ITES.
- Infopark, Cherthala — IT/ITES.
- Smart City, Kochi — IT/ITES.
- NeST Electronics City, Kochi — Electronics hardware.
- Puthuvype, Kochi — Port-based.
- Cyberpark (Government), Kozhikode — IT/ITES.
- Cyberpark (ULCCS Private), Kozhikode — IT/ITES.
- Infopark, Thrissur — IT/ITES.
- Hindalco, Alupuram — Aluminium smelting.
- FACT, Aluva — Fertilisers.
- Travancore Cochin Chemicals, Kalamassery — Chemicals.
- Defence Park, Ottapalam — Defence manufacturing.
- Kanjikode Industrial Cluster, Palakkad — Multi-sector.
- Seafood Park, Aroor — Seafood processing.
- Binani Zinc Smelter, Eloor — Zinc smelting.
- Hindustan Machine Tools, Kalamassery — Engineering.
- Adoor Industrial Cluster, Pathanamthitta — Multi-sector.
- Textile Park, Taliparamba — Textiles.
- Hindustan Latex, Thiruvananthapuram — Medical products.
- BIO 360 Life Sciences Park, Thiruvananthapuram — Biotechnology.
- Kerala Drugs and Pharmaceuticals, Alappuzha — Pharmaceuticals.
- McDowell's Distilleries, Varanad, Cherthala — Distilleries.

=== Madhya Pradesh ===
- Indore SEZ, Pithampur, Indore — Multi-product.
- Bhopal SEZ, Mandideep — Multi-sector.
- DMIC Udyogpuri, Ujjain — Industrial.
- Yash IT/Technology Park, Indore — IT/ITES.
- Impetus Infotech, Indore — IT/ITES.
- Crystal IT Park SEZ, Indore — IT/ITES.
- Infosys Ltd, Indore — IT/ITES.
- TCS Ltd, Indore — IT/ITES.
- ClearTrail Technologies, Indore — IT/ITES.

=== Maharashtra ===
- Hiranandani Builders, Powai — IT/ITES.
- Infosys Technologies Ltd., Rajiv Gandhi Infotech Park, Phase II, Maan village, Mulshi taluka, Pune district — IT/ITES.
- Serum Bio-Pharma Park, Pune — Pharmaceuticals and biotechnology.
- EON Kharadi, Haveli taluka, Pune district — IT/ITES.
- Wipro, Hinjawadi, Pune — IT/ITES.
- DLF Akruti, Pune — IT/ITES.
- Maharashtra Airport Development Corporation (MADC), MIHAN, Nagpur — Multi-product (the largest multi-product SEZ in Maharashtra).
- Wardha Power Company Pvt. Ltd., Chandrapur district — Energy and power.
- Dynasty Developers Pvt. Ltd. (Pune Embassy India Pvt. Ltd.), Pune — IT/ITES.
- The Manjri Stud Farm Private Ltd., Pune — IT/ITES.
- Maharashtra Industrial Development Corporation Ltd., Pune — IT/ITES.
- Syntel International Pvt. Ltd., Pune — IT/ITES.
- Magarpatta Township Development and Construction Company Ltd., Pune — Electronics hardware and software, including IT/ITES.
- MIDC, Aurangabad — Aluminium and related industries.
- NMSEZ (Reliance), Navi Mumbai — Multi-sector.
- Mindspace, Airoli, Navi Mumbai — IT/ITES.
- Khed Economic Infrastructure Private Limited (KEIPL) (Bharat Forge), Rajgurunagar (Khed), Pune district — Multi-sector.

=== Odisha ===
- Hindalco Industries SEZ, Sambalpur — Aluminium and related industries.
- Genpact SEZ, Bhubaneswar — IT/ITES.
- Infocity Bhubaneswar SEZ, Bhubaneswar — IT/ITES.
- Infovalley Bhubaneswar SEZ, Bhubaneswar — IT/ITES.
- IDCO SEZ, Bhubaneswar — IT/ITES.
- IDCO SEZ, Chandaka, Bhubaneswar — IT/ITES.
- IDCO Knowledge Park, Bhubaneswar — Multi-sector.
- IDCO SEZ, Mahakalpada, Bhubaneswar — Multi-sector.
- Jindal Steel and Power SEZ, Choudwar — Steel and power.
- Lanco Solar SEZ, Cuttack — Solar and renewable energy.
- POSCO India SEZ, Paradeep — Steel and related industries.
- Dhamra SEZ Ltd., Dhamra — Port-based and multi-sector.
- Saraf Agencies SEZ, Chhatrapur — Titanium and related industries.
- Suryo Infra Projects Private Limited SEZ, Bhubaneswar — Multi-sector.
- Tata Consultancy Services SEZ, Bhubaneswar — IT/ITES.
- Tata Steel SEZ, Gopalpur — Steel and downstream industries.
- Vedanta Resources SEZ, Jharsuguda — Aluminium and related industries.
- Welspun SEZ, Choudwar — Steel and related industries.
- Wipro SEZ, Bhubaneswar — IT/ITES.

=== Rajasthan ===
- Mahindra World City (Jaipur) Ltd., Kalwara village, Jaipur — IT/ITES.
- Mansarovar Industrial Development Corporation, Kaparda, Jodhpur — IT/ITES.
- Kisan Udyog, Khara, Bikaner — Agro and food processing.
- AIC, Hindaun City — Multi-sector.
- Kaladwas Industrial Estate (SEZ), Udaipur — Multi-sector.
- Bhiwadi SEZ, Bhiwadi — Multi-sector.

=== Tamil Nadu ===
- Astromar Free Trade Zone, Chennai — Free trade zone.
- MRL FTWZ, Nanguneri, Tirunelveli — Free trade and warehousing zone.
- New Chennai Township Private Limited Engineering SEZ, Chennai — Engineering.
- New Chennai Township Private Limited Multi Services SEZ, Chennai — Multi-services.
- Shriram Properties and Infrastructure Private Limited, Perungalathur village, Chennai — IT/ITES.
- Ilandhaikulam SEZ, Madurai — IT/ITES.
- Vadapalanji SEZ, Madurai — IT/ITES.
- SIPCOT Industrial Complex, Thoothukudi — Multi-sector.
- SIPCOT Information Technology Park, Siruseri, Chennai — IT/ITES.
- TRIL Inforpark Ltd., Rajiv Gandhi Salai (OMR), Taramani, Chennai — IT/ITES.
- ETL Infrastructure Services Limited, Tambaram Taluk, Kancheepuram district, Chennai — IT/ITES.
- SIPCOT Automobile and Engineering SEZ, Coimbatore — Automobile and engineering.
- DLF Infocity Developers Ltd., Manapakkam and Mugalivakkam, Chennai — IT/ITES.
- Arun Excello (Estancia) Infrastructure Private Limited, Vallancheri and Potheri villages, Chengalpet Taluk, Kancheepuram district, Chennai — IT/ITES.
- ETA Technopark Private Limited, Old Mahabalipuram Road, Navallur village, Chengalpet Taluk, Kancheepuram district — IT/ITES.
- Tamil Nadu Industrial Development Corporation Limited (TIDCO) SEZ, Hosur, Krishnagiri district — IT/ITES.
- Electronics Corporation of Tamil Nadu (ELCOT), Kancheepuram — IT/ITES.
- SIPCOT Multi-sector SEZ, Perundurai, Erode — Multi-sector.
- ELCOT SEZ, Vilankurichi, Coimbatore — IT/ITES.
- TIDEL Park Coimbatore, Vilankurichi, Coimbatore — IT/ITES.
- TIDEL Park Salem SEZ, Salem — IT/ITES.
- Wipro Technologies ELCOT SEZ, Vilankurichi, Coimbatore — IT/ITES.
- Wipro Technologies ELCOT SEZ, Sholinganallur, Chennai — IT/ITES.
- HCL ELCOT SEZ, Sholinganallur, Chennai — IT/ITES.
- SIPCOT Industrial Area, Sriperumbudur — Electronics, telecom hardware and support services, including trading and logistics activities.
- Textiles SEZ, Uttukuli Taluk, Tirupur district — Textiles.
- SIPCOT Electronic Hardware SEZ, Oragadam — Electronic hardware.
- Cheyyar SEZ, Cheyyar, Tiruvannamalai district — Footwear.
- Salem IT Park SEZ (Vee Technologies), Dalmia Board, Salem district — IT/ITES.
- ELCOT IT/ITES SEZ, Navalpattu, Tiruchirappalli — IT/ITES.

=== Telangana ===
- Telangana Industrial Infrastructure Corporation Ltd., Nanakramguda village, Serilingampalli mandal, Ranga Reddy district — IT/ITES.
- CMC Limited, Ranga Reddy district, Hyderabad — IT/ITES.
- DivyaSree NSL Infrastructure Private Limited, Ranga Reddy district, Hyderabad — IT/ITES.
- Tech Mahindra Limited, Madhapur, Ranga Reddy district, Hyderabad — IT/ITES.
- Tech Mahindra Limited, Bahadurpally, Ranga Reddy district, Hyderabad — IT/ITES.
- DLF Commercial Developers Ltd., Ranga Reddy district, Hyderabad — IT/ITES.
- Hyderabad Gems SEZ Ltd., Ranga Reddy district, Hyderabad — Gems and jewellery.
- Fab City SPV (India) Pvt. Ltd., Ranga Reddy district — IT/ITES.
- L&T Phoenix Infoparks Pvt. Ltd., Telangana — IT/ITES.
- Maytas Hill County SEZ Pvt. Ltd., Bachupally village, Bachupally mandal — IT/ITES.
- Serene Properties Pvt. Ltd., Pocharam village, Hayathnagar, Ghatkesar mandal — IT/ITES.
- Sundew Properties Pvt. Ltd., Madhapur, Ranga Reddy district — IT/ITES.
- Wipro Limited, Manikonda, Ranga Reddy district — IT/ITES.
- Lanco Hills Technology Park Pvt. Ltd., Hyderabad — IT/ITES.
- Infosys Technologies Hyderabad SEZ, Pocharam — IT/ITES.
- IT SEZ, Madikonda, Warangal — IT/ITES.
- Mindspace, Hyderabad — IT/ITES.

=== West Bengal ===
- Unitech Hi-tech Structures Ltd., New Town, Kolkata — IT/ITES.
- DLF IT SEZ, Rajarhat, New Town, Kolkata — IT/ITES.
- SP Infotech, Rajarhat, New Town, Kolkata — IT/ITES.
- Bengal Gem and Jewellery Park, Salt Lake Sector V, Kolkata — Jewellery manufacturing and studies.
- Wipro SEZ, Salt Lake Electronics Complex, Salt Lake Sector V, Kolkata — IT/ITES.
- Falta Special Economic Zone, Falta — Multi-product.
- Bantala Leather Complex, Bantala — Leather products.
- TCS Gitanjali Park IT/ITES SEZ, New Town, Kolkata — IT/ITES.

=== Uttar Pradesh ===
- HCL IT City, Lucknow, Uttar Pradesh — IT and Start-up.

== See also ==
- Administrative divisions of India
- Cultural Zones of India, 7 in India
- Earthquake zones of India, 5 in India
- Ecoregions in India, 46 in India
- Zonal Councils of India, 6 in India
- Free-trade zone
- Free-trade zone in India
- Special economic zone
- Petroleum, Chemicals and Petrochemicals Investment Region
