= Economy of Visakhapatnam =

Aspect of the city in Andhra Pradesh, India

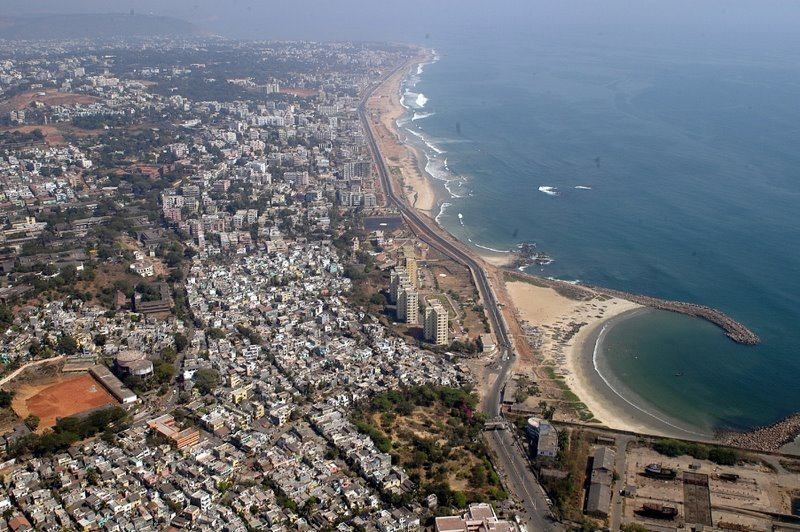
Aerial view of Visakhapatnam city

Visakhapatnam is the largest city of Andhra Pradesh. Visakhapatnam has a GDP of $43.5 billion. It is the 10th richest city in India. Fishing industry, road–rail connectivity, many heavy industries like Hindustan Petroleum, Visakhapatnam Steel Plant, Hindustan Shipyard, Visakhapatnam Port Trust, National Thermal Power, Bharat Heavy Electricals, BARC, Naval Science and Technological Laboratory, Naval Dockyard, Dredging Corporation of India, Strategic Petroleum Reserve, NMDC, CONCOR, Andhra Pradesh Medtech Zone etc.

As of 2025 it is the 10th Largest City in Economy in India.

Private sector like Coromandel International, Ferro Alloys Corporation, Gangavaram Port, etc., are the factors that made the city into an industrial hub, from a small hamlet. Tourism also plays an important role in generating revenue, with numerous tourist destinations in and around the city. Blessed with a natural harbour and one of the largest ports of India, sea trade was made possible with other countries which also boosts the economy. The service sector contributes for 55 per cent of the total GDP of Visakhapatnam, while 35 percent comes from the industrial sector and 10 per cent from agricultural and allied sectors.

== Fisheries ==
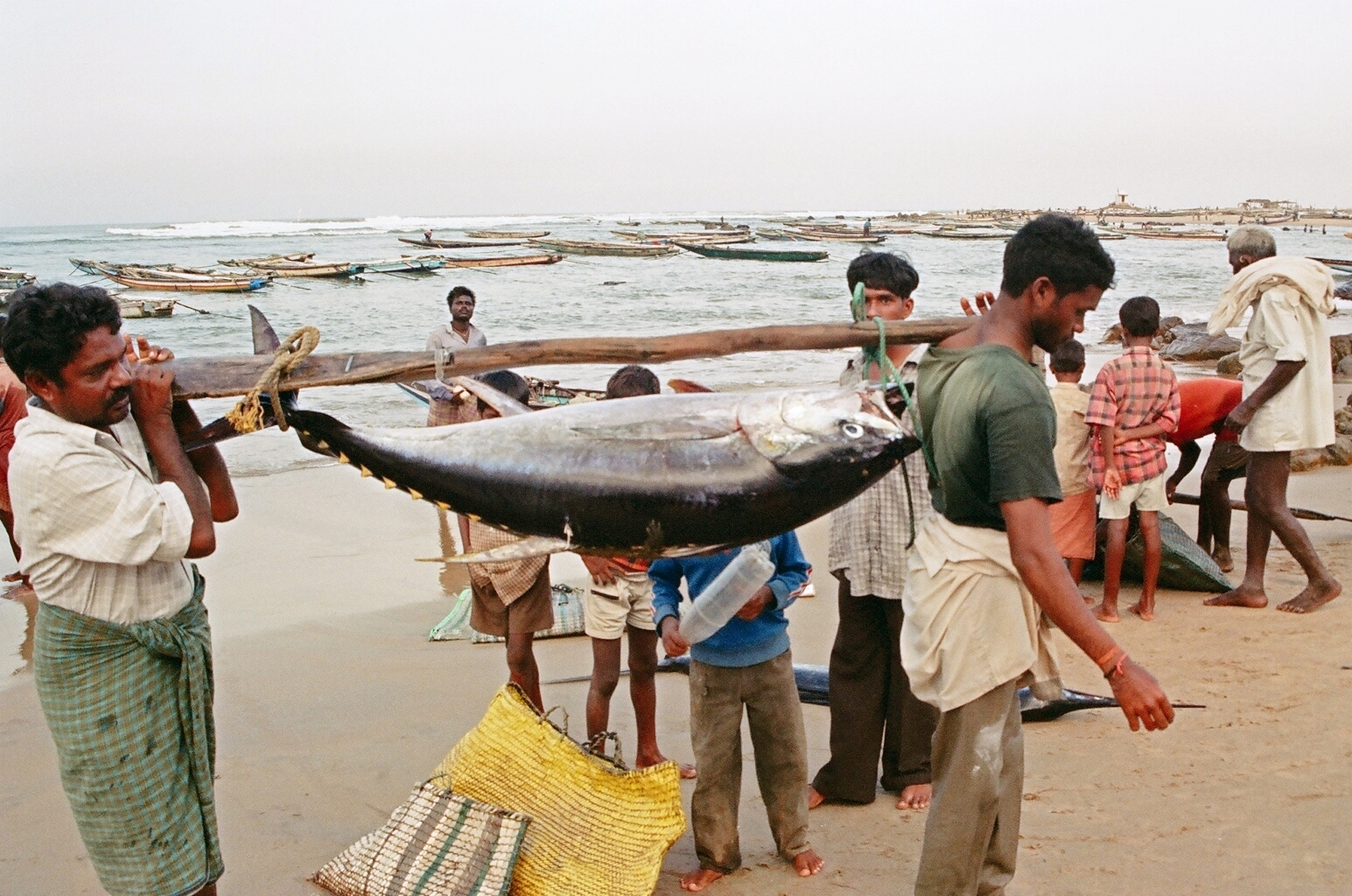
Fishermen at work, Visakhapatnam

Fishing is a major occupation in Visakhapatnam, as many fishermen depend on fishing for their livelihood. The fishing harbour at Visakhapatnam Port is one of the biggest in the coastal corridor of Andhra Pradesh and also exports seafood such as Tuna. Fish preserving by drying, processing and curing activities takes place at the harbour. The dried fish is sent to markets in Tamil Nadu, Karnataka, and Orissa, and also exported to Sri Lanka, Singapore, Burma and others. Ice factories in and outside the Fishing Harbour Visakhapatnam can produce tonnes of ice, catering to the needs of the fishermen and also provides industrial employment.

== Ports ==
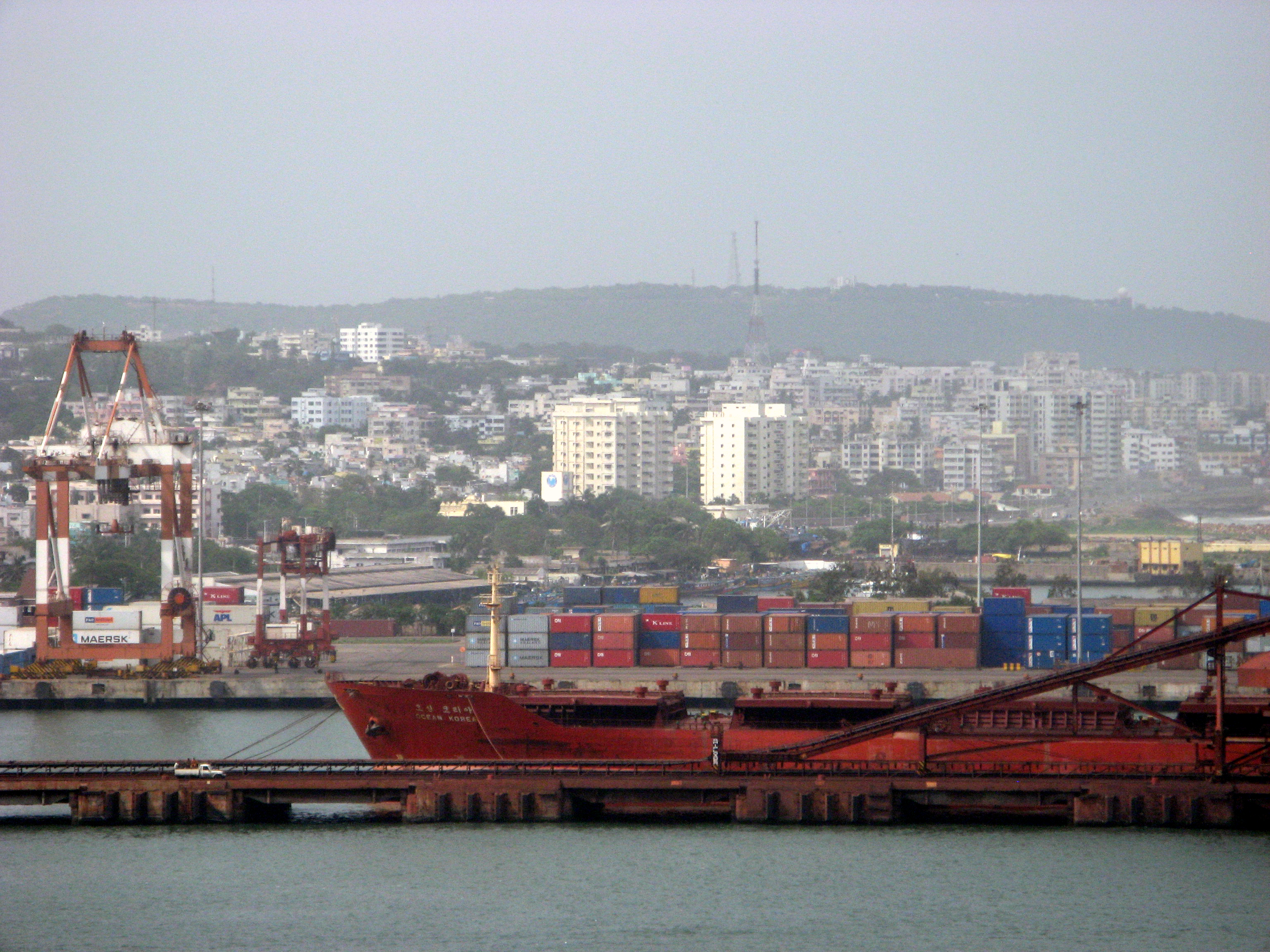
The City, overlooking seaport

Visakhapatnam Port is one of the largest cargo handling ports in India. It can accommodate 150,000 DWT vessels and draft up to 17 m (56 ft). The port during 2013–14 period, handled 58 million tonnes of cargo and also a cape size vessel in the outer harbour. Neighboring ports, current projects, decline in iron ore exports, Gangavaram Port, lead to loss of cargo to Visakhapatnam Port.

A ₹13,000 (US$130) crores modernisation and expansion program of the port is underway, to increase the capacity to 130 million tonnes by 2016–17. Products moved through the port include petroleum, steel, minerals, and foods.

The inauguration of the Gangavaram Port, located 15 km away from the Visakhapatnam Port, has led to a significant diversion of traffic away from Visakhapatnam. It has the capacity of accommodating ocean liners of 200,000–250,000 DWT. The Visakhapatnam Port Trust plans to develop a satellite port at Bheemunipatnam to reduce the traffic.

== SEZs and industrial parks ==
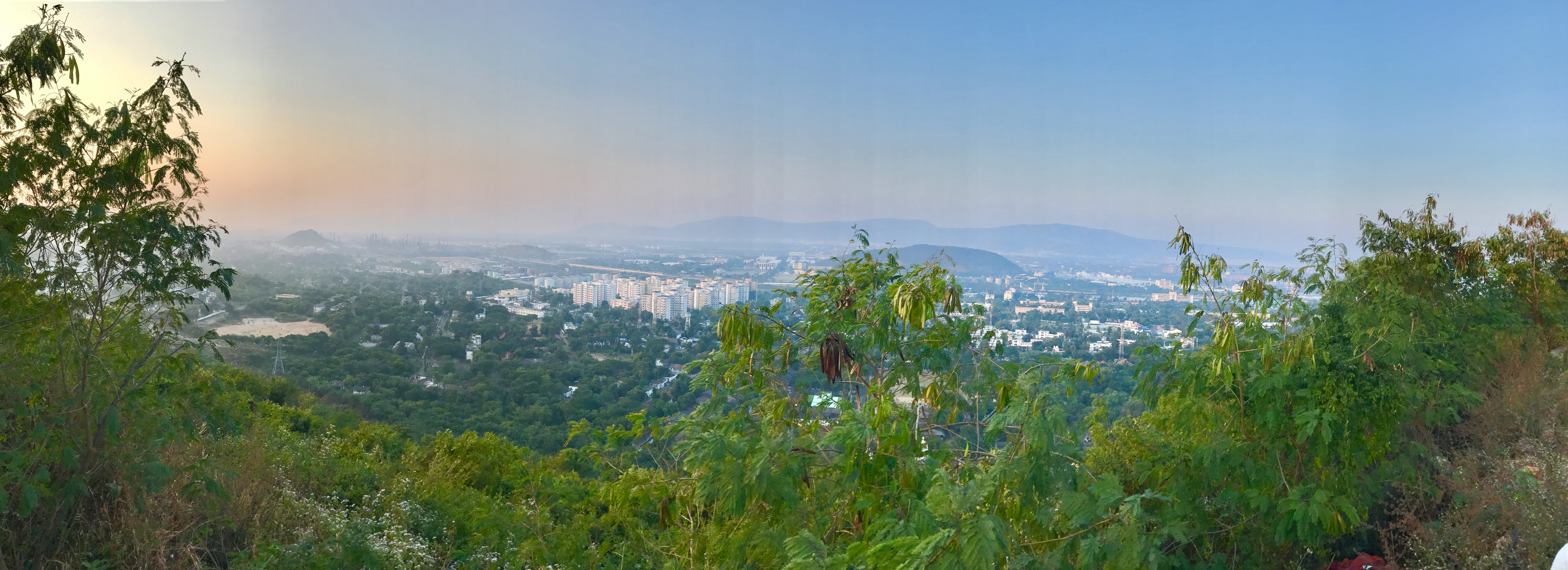
Panoramic View of Naval Industrial Area

There are special economic zones (SEZs) and industrial corridors such as Visakhapatnam Special Economic Zone (VSEZ), APSEZ, APIIC, Aganumpudi Industrial Park, Visakha Dairy, JNPC, Andhra Pradesh Medtech Zone.

== Pharmaceuticals ==
Jawaharlal Nehru Pharma City (Ramky Pharma City (India) Limited) is a Public Private Partnership between Government of Andhra Pradesh and Ramky Group. It is a special purpose entity, setup for the manufacturing of bulk drugs and pharmaceuticals. It is the first industrial township in India, spread over an extent of 2,400 acres (970 ha) with 102 companies and 8698 employees, presently in operational. PharmaZell of Germany and Eisai Pharma of Japan, French collaboration with SNF Ltd, joint US venture Aptuit Laurus Labs and US multinational company Hospira Healthcare Private Limited (a Pfizer Company) are major companies in the pharma city.

== Heavy industries ==
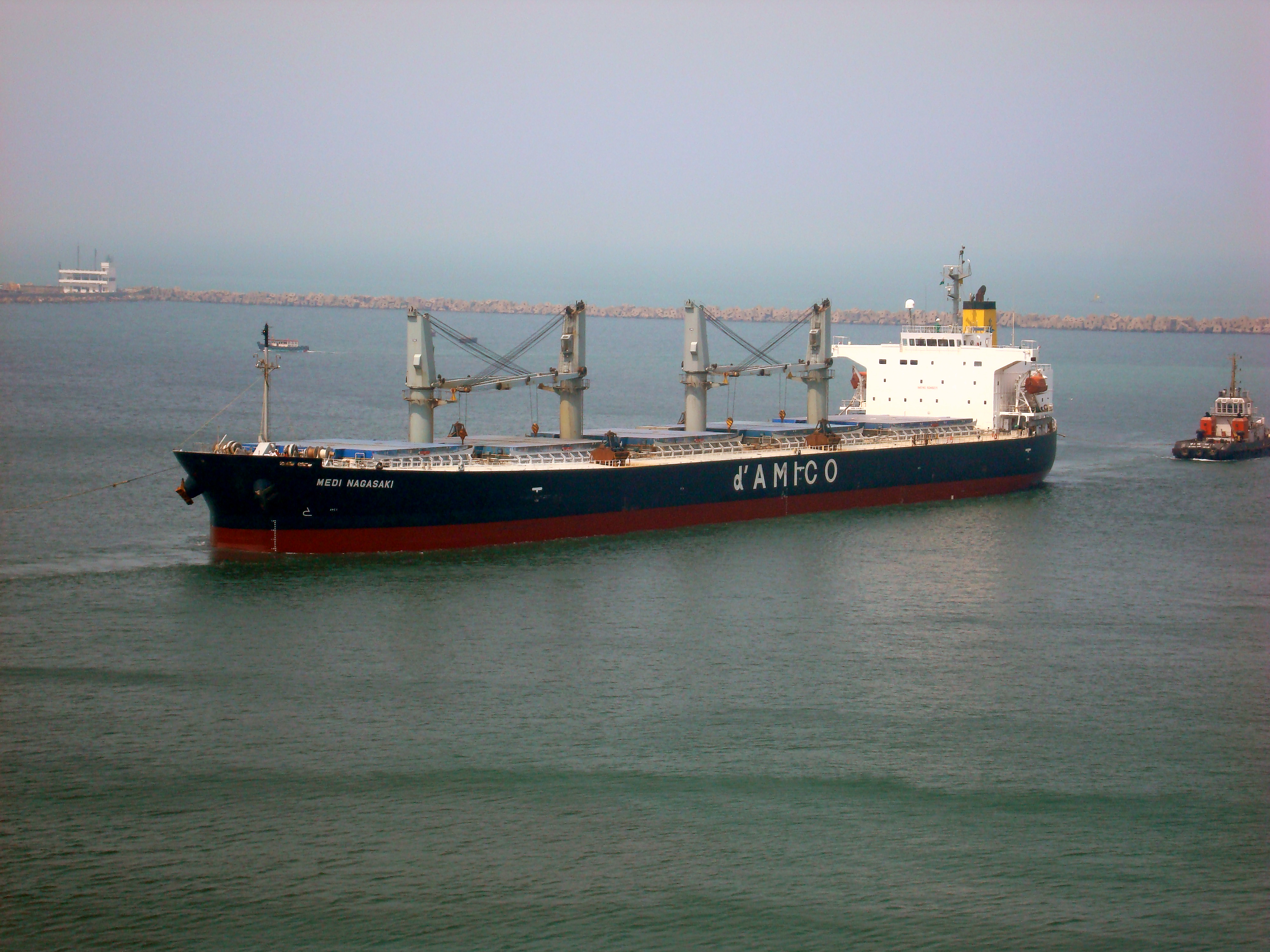
A cargo ship at Vizag Shipyard

Hindustan shipyard

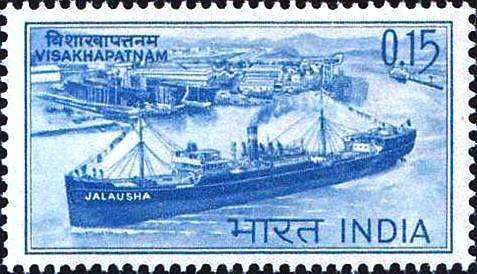
Jalausha on Stamp of India released on National Maritime Day.

The defense administered Hindustan Shipyard Limited, built the first ship of India in 1948, which was named as Jala Usha and also built 167 various size of ships. The ports and shipyard in the city led to the establishment of several large scale industries such as, GAIL, HPCL, BHEL, Hindustan Zinc, Dredging Corporation of India, Coromandel Fertilizers, Reliance and Brandix etc, and industries headquartered in Visakhapatnam are RINL, Dredging Corporation of India, etc.

Steel plant

Visakhapatnam Steel Plant, whose corporate entity RINL is the second largest state-run steel industry. The capacity of the plant has been upgraded to 6.3MT, and it covers an area of 20,000 acres (81 km^{2}). It is planned to become a 20MT plant in the future, the largest plant in a single location. The plant had revenues of ₹144,570 million (US$2 billion) for 2011–2012 and has about 17,800 employees.

== Software industry ==
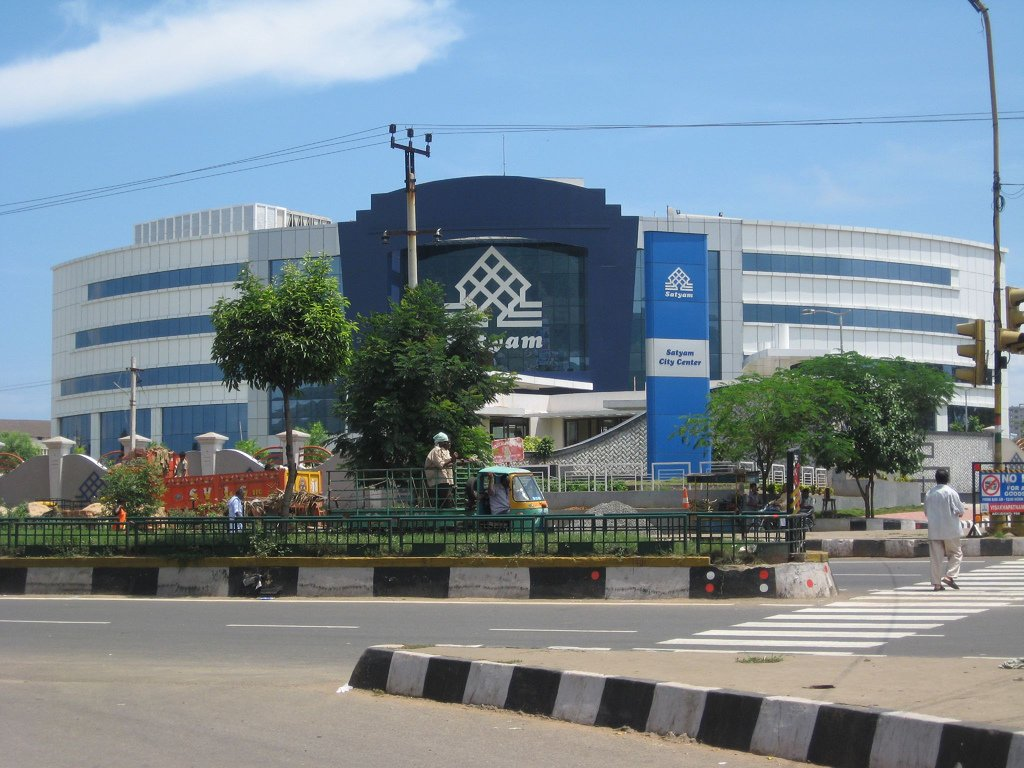
Tech Mahindra Development Centre

The ITES and IT sector is growing at its pace in the city of Visakhapatnam, the generated revenue from these sectors are a boon to the economy. The IT special economic zone and incubation center exists at Rushikonda Hills, of the city. There are many national and multi–national IT/ITes and banking firms such as Mahindra Satyam, Pulsus Group, Wipro, Kenexa, IBM, Sutherland, and HSBC etc. Software exports from Visakhapatnam have increased by nearly 90% each year.

The IT exports from the city for 2012 were ₹1,200 crore and 16,000 people were employed. According to data released by the state IT department for the financial year 2012–13, IT/ITeS generated revenue of ₹1,445 crore (US$150 million), an increase of 20% compared to the previous financial year. The same year saw an increase in employment, generated by the IT/ITeS industry, with 16,988 jobs as compared to 16,000 in 2011–12 period. The Information Technology Investment Region (ITIR) project, planned by the Government of Andhra Pradesh, may generate employment to approximately, up to 15 lakh IT professionals and also the it can generate revenue for the economy, of up to ₹3.11 crore (US$320,000).

Visakhapatnam, as part of the Digital India IBPS scheme, has generated 10,000 jobs. The state of Andhra Pradesh secured 13,792 seats out of a total of 48,300 seats allocated across India.

== Minerals and resources ==
Visakhapatnam and its surrounding areas are having mineral deposits of quartzite, bauxite, graphite, manganese, titanium, silica sand and 1,000 MT of bauxite reserves. The Iron ore and other minerals, from the neighbouring states are transported through rail and road to Visakhapatnam. These minerals are exported through sea to other countries. Ilmenite is used for extraction of titanium and Monazite for extraction of thorium are found at Bheemunipatnam. Ferroalloy plants, Aluminium refineries (such as Anrak Aluminium and Jindal Aluminium) are developing, due to the close proximity of manganese and bauxite.

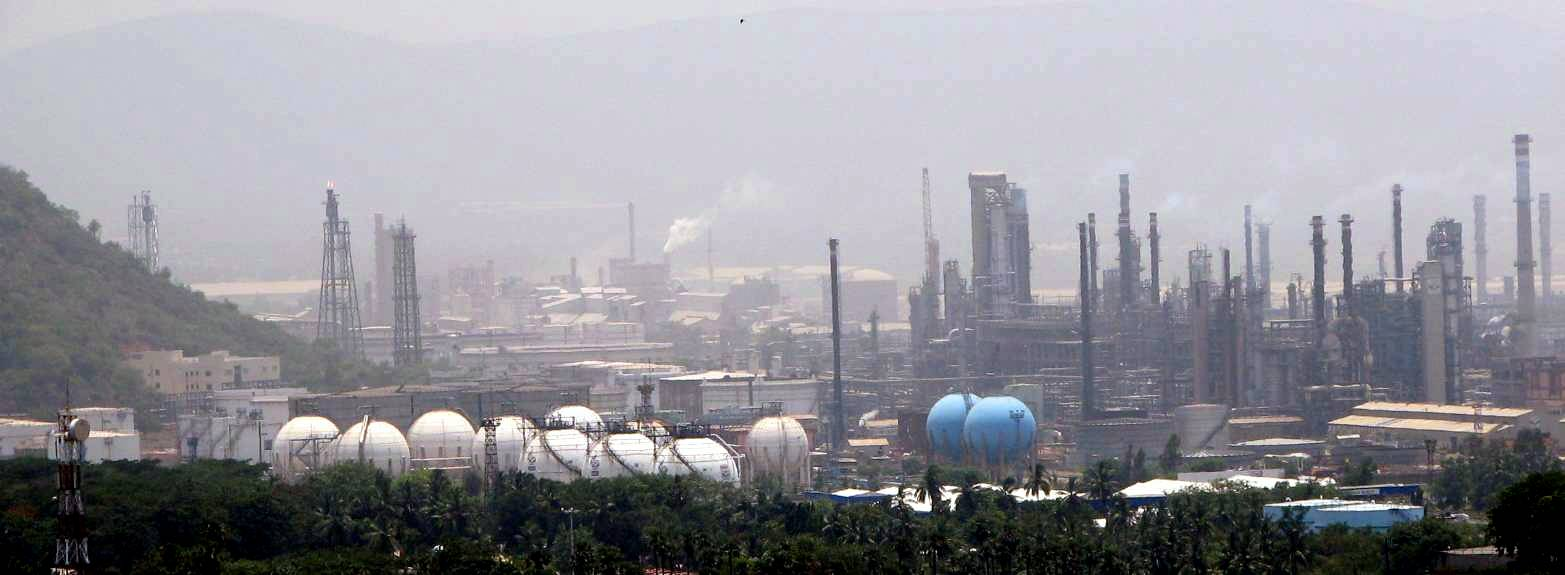
HPCL Petrochemical Complex

Petro corridor

Visakhapatnam holds crude oil reserves with Hindustan Petroleum Corporation Refinery, IOC and BPCL have their bottling units in the city. Visakhapatnam is a part of the Visakhapatnam–Kakinada Petroleum, Chemicals and Petrochemicals Investment Region (VK PCPIR), proposed between Visakhapatnam and Kakinada.

Power plants

Simhadri Super Thermal Power Plant is a coal-based power plant under the ownership of NTPC Limited. It has a capacity of 2000 MW with 4 units of 500 MW each. Hindujas has begun construction of a 1,040 MW coal-based thermal power plant in Visakhapatnam district with two 520 MW units.

== See also ==
- Economy of Andhra Pradesh
