= Kundanahalli =

Kundanahalli may refer to:

== Geography ==
- Kundanahalli, Mysuru, a village in Piriyapatna Taluk in Mysore district of Karnataka state, India
- Kundanahalli, Mandya, a village in Krishnarajpet Taluk in Mandya district of Karnataka state, India
- Kundalahalli, Bangalore, a neighborhood in Bangalore of Karnataka state, India sometimes wrongly referred as Kundanahalli
