= Dosuru =

Village in Andhra Pradesh, India

Dosuru Nettivanipalem
- Suburb
- Location in Andhra Pradesh
- Coordinates: 17.546683°N 83.035323°E
- Country: India
- State: Andhra Pradesh
- District: Anakapalli

Government
  - Body: Visakhapatnam Metropolitan Region Development Authority

Languages
  - Official: Telugu
- Time zone: UTC+5:30 (IST)
- PIN: 531011
- Vehicle registration: AP-31,32,33

Dosuru is a village in Atchutapuram mandal, Anakapalli district, Andhra Pradesh, India. It is a suburban area of Visakhapatnam.

== About ==
Dosuru is in Atchutapuram Mandal and is 8 km (5.0 mi) from mandal headquarters and 16 km (9.9 mi) from Anakapalle.
