= Duppituru =

- Suburb
- Location in Andhra Pradesh
- Coordinates: 17.522806°N 82.969501°E
- Country: India
- State: Andhra Pradesh
- District: Anakapalli

Government
  - Body: Visakhapatnam Metropolitan Region Development Authority

Languages
  - Official: Telugu
- Time zone: UTC+5:30 (IST)
- Vehicle registration: AP-31,32

Duppituru is located in Atchutapuram Mandal Anakapalli district state of Andhra Pradesh, India.

Andhra Pradesh Special Economic Zone is situated in this village.
