= 2023 Visakhapatnam Fishing Harbour fire =

Fire in Andhra Pradesh, India

- Date: 19–20 November 2023
- Location: Visakhapatnam Fishing Harbour, Visakhapatnam, Andhra Pradesh, India; 17.695804°N 83.302501°E
- Type: Harbour Fire
- Cause: Unknown
- Deaths: None
- Injuries: None
- Property damage: Loss of Rs. 30 - 35 Crores (USD 3.6-4.2 Million)

On 19 November 2023, at around 23:00 IST, a fire erupted at the Visakhapatnam Fishing Harbour, leading to the complete destruction of 43 fishing boats, while an additional 15 boats damaged partially. Source from which fire triggered is unknown and was under police enquiry.

Reports suggest that a fire at the Visakhapatnam Fishing Harbour resulted in an estimated loss of Rs. 30-35 Crores (US$3.6-4.2 Million). Local Boy Nani, a well-known YouTuber and fisherman, was initially arrested in connection with the incident. However, he was released after a preliminary inquiry, with police stating that CCTV footage did not support the suspicion against him.

Police announced on 26 November 2023, their determination of the fire's cause, attributing it to locals Vasupalli Nani and Satyam, who, allegedly intoxicated, casually threw a cigarette into a boat, leading to a fire. Local fisherwomen protested the arrest, disputing the police version.

The government awarded ₹7.11 crore for property damages, including 49 boats, and provided ₹10,000 to 400 workers dependent on the affected boats.

== Incident ==
A fire broke out at the Visakhapatnam Fishing Harbour sometime after 23:00 IST on 19 November 2023. The fire rapidly spread to tens of boats, causing some to emit smoke and flames as fuel sources, such as LPG cylinders and fuel tanks, ignited. The fire department made their efforts to get the fire under control for over four hours and finally fire was brought under control by 4:30 am IST on 20 November.

Several boats with fresh livestock were burned, along with the fish within them. Police initially estimated loss of around 25 fishing boats but later authorities found that 43 fishing boats were completely destroyed and 15 boats were partially damaged. This accident did not result in any loss of life.

== Aftermath ==
Harbour fishing market which operates on fishing activities of the Harbour got shut during next day as most of the livestock fished was burned during the accident. Authorities primarily estimated a loss of Rs. 30 - 35 Crores (US$3.6-4.2 Million) due to the accident. A local fisherman turned popular YouTuber, Local Boy Nani, was initially arrested under suspicion that the fire broke out due to a dispute within a group of friends who were allegedly partying at the harbor. Nani filmed the accident live and shared it on YouTube in which he said that the source of fire is unknown. Nani was released after a preliminary inquiry, and news reports indicated that the police stated the CCTV footage did not support the suspicion against Nani.

The Government of Andhra Pradesh has established a special committee to investigate the recent fire accident. Comprising officials from the revenue, fire services, fisheries, and police departments, this committee is focused on examining the circumstances surrounding the incident. In addition to the committee, the government has formed a dedicated team consisting of personnel from the Crime, Task Force, and Central Crime Station (CCS) wings.

Police announced that they could determine the cause of the fire and identify the culprits behind the accident on 26 November 2023. According to their account, two locals named Vasupalli Nani and Satyam, working as a cook and a watchman on fishing boats, who were heavily intoxicated, casually threw a cigarette into a boat. This action resulted in the accident as the fishing nets in the boat caught fire, leading to the fire accident. Some local fisherwomen protested against this arrest accusing police of framing case against innocent.

The state government declared a compensation of ₹7.11 crore for property damages, including 49 boats, to affected families. Additionally, ₹10,000 was provided to each of the 400 workers dependent on the damaged boats.
