= Bhattam Srirama Murthy =

Indian politician

Member of Parliament
- Preceded by: K. A. Swami
- Succeeded by: Uma Gajapathi Raju
- Constituency: Visakhapatnam

Personal details
- Born: 2 May 1926 Dharmavaram village, Vizianagram district
- Died: 6 July 2015 (aged 89) Visakhapatnam, Andhra Pradesh, India
- Party: Telugu Desam Party
- Spouse: Bhattam Satyavathi
- Children: 3; 1 son and 2 daughters

Bhattam Srirama Murthy B.A., L.L.B. (12 May 1926 – 6 July 2015) was an Indian politician who was a Member of the Andhra Pradesh Legislative Assembly and Indian Parliament.

== Political ==
He was a member of the All India Congress Committee for about 16 years. He was General Secretary of Vizianagaram Town Students Congress in 1945-46 and President, Maharajah's College Students Union, 1946–47. He was associated with Socialist Party of India and Joint Secretary of State Socialist Party in 1955 and became General Secretary of the same party in 1957.

He was elected to the Andhra Pradesh Legislative Assembly in 1962 from Vizianagaram constituency and in 1972 and 1978 from Paravada constituency. He was Minister in the Government of Andhra Pradesh and held the portfolios of Education and Cultural Affairs in 1972, Social Welfare between 1974–78 and Cultural Affairs in 1981. He was elected to the 8th Lok Sabha from Visakhapatnam (Lok Sabha constituency) in 1984 as a member of Telugu Desam Party.

He has attended the World Peace Council Conference held at Hungary.

== Literary work ==
He was Sub Editor of "Jaya Bharat" magazine 1947-48 and Editor of "Prajaradham" Telugu Weekly and "Andhra Janatha" Telugu Daily published from Hyderabad, 1969. He wrote four books in Telugu language. He wrote his biography covering the political career lasting for 6 decades entitled "Swechcha Bharatam" and published in 2009.

== personal life ==
He was the son of Shri Sannayya and born at Dharmavaram village in Vizianagaram district on 12 May 1926. He married Smt. Bhattam Satyavathi; They had 1 son and 2 daughters.

== Death ==
He died on 6 July 2015 in a private hospital at Visakhapatnam due to prolonged illness.
