= Jawaharlal Nehru Pharma City =

Coordinates: 17.660160°N 83.084292°E

- Type: Industrial Park
- Headquarters: Parawada, Visakhapatnam, India
- Products: Pharma -products
- Owner: Government of Andhra Pradesh, RAMKY Group
- Website: www.ramky.com

Jawaharlal Nehru Pharma City or JN Pharma City or Pharma City is a Pharma SEZ situated in the city of Visakhapatnam, India. It is the first industrial township in India.

== Location ==
Jawaharlal Nehru Pharma City is located in Parawada, with a spread over of 2,400 acres.

== Details ==
This pharma city foundation stone was laid by Y. S. Rajasekhara Reddy, then Chief Minister of Andhra Pradesh. It is a pharma product SEZ and Andhra Pradesh State largest Pharma SEZ spread over 2143 acres. Most all multi-national pharma companies started their operations here, like Hospira, Hetero, Shasun, Natco, Eisai, Mylan, Biocon, GVK BIO, and Gland Pharma.

== See also ==
- Visakhapatnam Special Economic Zone
