= Dredging Corporation of India =

Indian dredging companypvt ltd

Dredging Corporation of India Limited
- Type: Joint-venture of public sector ports
- Traded as: NSE: DREDGECORP; BSE: 523618
- Industry: Dredging; Land reclamation
- Founded: 29 March 1976
- Headquarters: Visakhapatnam, India
- Key people: Capt. S. Divakar (Managing Director & CEO A/C)
- Products: Maintenance Dredging, Capital Dredging, Land Reclamation, Beach nourishment
- Revenue: ▼₹7,438 million (US$79 million) (2014)
- Net income: ▲₹624 million (US$6.7 million) (2014)
- Number of employees: 566 (2014)
- Website: dredge-india.com

Dredging Corporation of India Limited, or DCI, is an Indian dredging company which does dredging for Indian seaports exclusively. It occasionally dredges at foreign seaports in countries such as Sri Lanka, Taiwan as well as in Dubai. It is mainly involved in maintenance dredging. Almost all the maintenance dredging in Indian seaports is carried out by DCI due to government regulations. DCI is also involved in capital dredging, beach nourishment, and land reclamation. The main seaports in which DCI does business are Visakhapatnam Port, Haldia Port, Kandla Port, Cochin Port and Ennore Port.

DCI is headquartered at Visakhapatnam and has project offices at many seaports in India. It reports to the Ministry of Shipping. It is ISO 14001:2004 and ISO 9001:2008 certified.

== About ==
DCI was incorporated as a public sector company in March 1976 under the Companies Act, 1956. It was listed on CSE and DSE stock exchanges in October 1992 and debuted on BSE on 28 February 2000. It went for an Initial public offering in March 2004. DCI engaged IHC Dredgers BV, Netherlands for design, construction and delivery of 5500 cu. m TSHD in 2011. It changed strategy to raise funds for purchasing additional dredgers by asking the seaports for investments. The capital thus raised was used to replenish its old fleet. The Government of India reduced current stake in the company by 5 percent. The offer for sale of 5 percent stake was well received by the investors. As part of its diversification plans DCI expresses interest to foray into international markets. Ex-chairman and managing director, Abraham Kuruvilla finds mention in bringing widespread reforms in the corporate management techniques at DCI. On 1 November 2017, the Government of India approved the disinvestment of Dredging Corporation of India On 8 November 2018, the Government of India approved the stake of DCI to 4 Government owned Ports. DCI has been handed over to 4 major ports viz: Vishakhapatnam Port Trust, Paradeep Port Trust, Jawaharlal Nehru Port Trust and Kandla Port Trust.

=== Financial Performance summary ===
The company has been through some rough weather with profits and revenues fluctuating wildly (see table below for detailed information). This is mainly due to its high dependency on Government funded projects and associated macro level economic fluctuations in the country.

Year	Revenue	% Change	Profit	% Change
2015	₹7,438 million (US$79 million)	▼ −3.74%	₹624 million (US$6.7 million)	▲66.18%
2014	₹7,727 million (US$83 million)	▲21.11%	₹375.5 million (US$4.0 million)	▲83.08%
2013	₹6,380 million (US$68 million)	▲28.22%	₹205.1 million (US$2.2 million)	▲55.61%
2012	₹4,976 million (US$53 million)	▼ −4.80%	₹131.8 million (US$1.4 million)	▼ −66.64%
2011	₹5,227 million (US$56 million)	▼ −24.67%	₹395.1 million (US$4.2 million)	▼ −43.60%
2010	₹6,939.5 million (US$74 million)	▼ −16.61%	₹700.5 million (US$7.5 million)	▲51.07%
2009	₹8,322 million (US$89 million)	▲7.87%	₹463.7 million (US$5.0 million)	▼ −70.05%
2008	₹7,715 million (US$82 million)	▲23.20%	₹1,548.2 million (US$17 million)	▼ −17.97%
2007	₹6,262 million (US$67 million)	▲14.96%	₹1,887.3 million (US$20 million)	▲6.95%

== Fleet ==
Dredger fleet consists mainly of Trailing Suction Hopper Dredgers (TSHD), Cutter Suction Dredgers (CSD) and Backhoe Dredgers.

TSHD Class dredgers includes DCI Dredge VI, DCI Dredge VIII, DCI Dredge IX, DCI Dredge XI, DCI Dredge XII, DCI Dredge XIV, DCI Dredge XV, DCI Dredge XVI, DCI Dredge XVII, DCI Dredge XIX, DCI Dredge XX and DCI Dredge XXI. CSD category dredgers are DCI Dredge VII, DCI Dredge Aquarius, DCI Dredge XVIII and DCI ID Ganga. There is one Backhoe Dredger namely DCI Dredge BH1. There are multiple Survey Launches pressed into service viz. DCI Survey Launch I, DCI Survey Launch II, DCI Survey Launch III. The fleet also includes a multi-purpose craft DCI Multicat I and a special utility purpose craft named DCI Tug VII.

== Projects ==
- Bulk dredging for the Sethusamudram Shipping Canal Project (SSCP) has been done by DCI.
- KKS port dredging
- Nourishment of Ramakrishna Mission Beach
- Dredging of Hussain Sagar lake to restore its depleting ecosystem.
