= Visakhapatnam Fishing Harbour =

Fishing Harbour
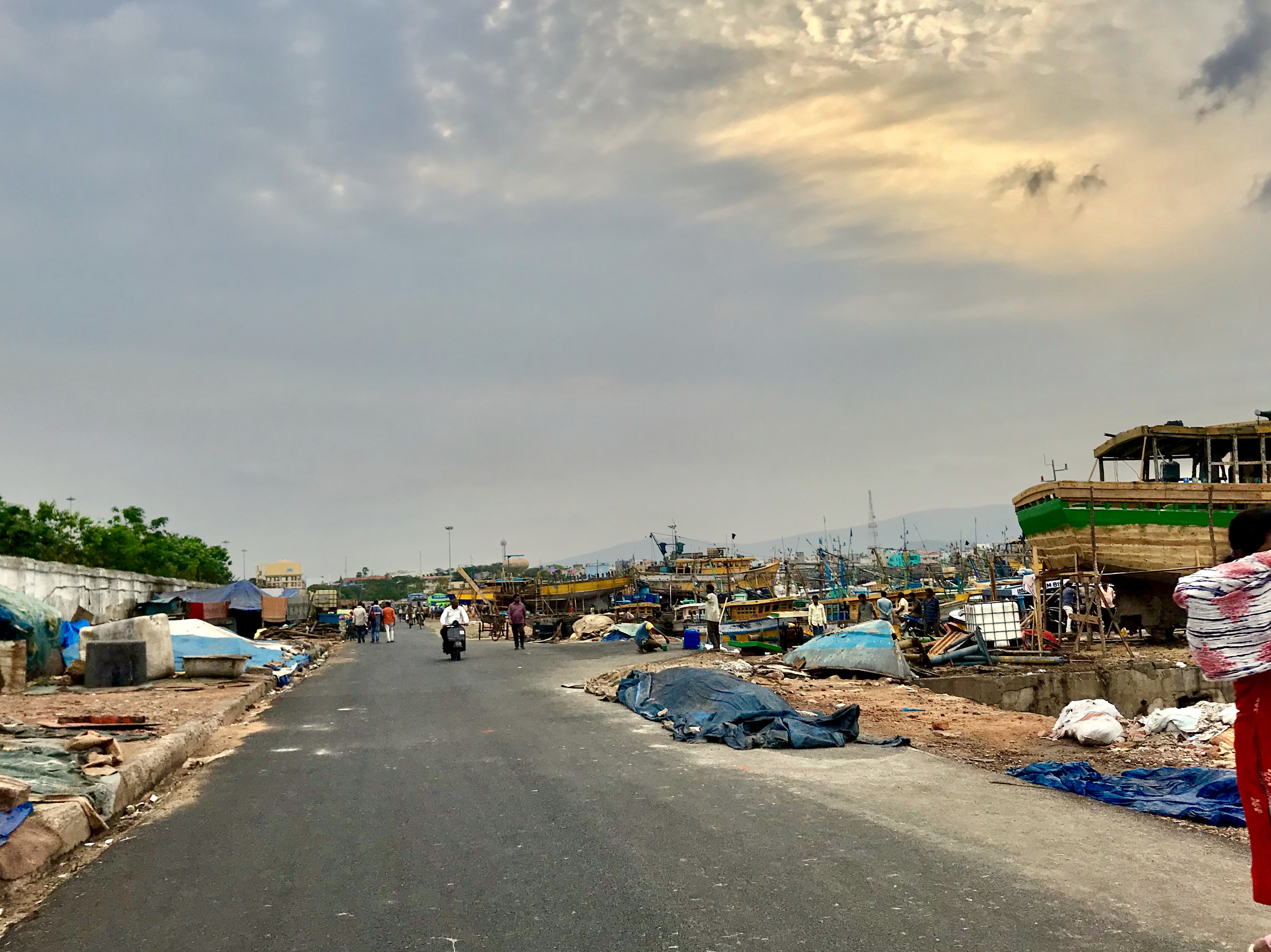
- Road at Fishing Harbour
- Interactive map of Fishing Harbour

Location
- Country: India
- Location: Visakhapatnam
- Coordinates: 17.695804°N 83.302501°E

Details
- Opened: 1976
- Owned by: Visakhapatnam Port Trust
- Type of harbour: Fishing port
- Size: 64.2474 acres (0.260000 km^{2})

Statistics
- Value of cargo: ₹7,500 crores (2018-19)

Visakhapatnam Fishing Harbour is a harbour in Visakhapatnam. It opened in 1976 beside Visakhapatnam Port.

The harbour spreads over 26 hectares. It is operated by the Visakhapatnam Port Trust. Its capacity is 700 mechanised boats and 300 beach landing crafts, with an annual turnover of ₹7,500 crores.

In November 2023, a fire broke out in the harbour, destroying 43 fishing boats and damaging 15 more.

== See also ==
- Visakhapatnam Port
