= Kundanahalli, Mandya =

Kundanahalli Kundanahally
- village
- Location in Karnataka, India Kundanahalli (India)
- Coordinates: 12.684651°N 76.444159°E
- Country: India
- State: Karnataka
- District: Mandya
- Taluks: Krishnarajapet
- Elevation: 798 m (2,618 ft)

Population (2011)
  - Total: 376

Languages
  - Official: Kannada
- Time zone: UTC+5:30 (IST)
- Postal code: 571426
- Vehicle registration: KA 54

Kundanahalli is a village in the southern state of Karnataka, India. The village has a close proximity to Makavalli, which hosts ICL Sugar Industry.

== See also ==
- Mandya
- Districts of Karnataka
