= Kundanahalli, Mysuru =

Kundanahalli Kundanahally
- village
- Location in Karnataka, India Kundanahalli (India)
- Coordinates: 12.357965°N 76.020474°E
- Country: India
- State: Karnataka
- District: Mysore
- Taluks: Periyapatna
- Elevation: 788 m (2,585 ft)

Population (2011)
  - Total: 675

Languages
  - Official: Kannada
- Time zone: UTC+5:30 (IST)
- Postal code: 571107
- Vehicle registration: KA 45

Kundanahalli is a village in Karnataka, India.

== Geography ==
It is located 79 km towards west from District headquarters Mysore, 7 km from Piriyapatna, 214 km from State capital Bangalore.

Muttur (4 km), Chittenahalli (5 km), Kampalapura (6 km), Bylakuppe (7 km), Piriyapatna (8 km) are nearby villages. Kundanahalli is surrounded by Virajpet Taluk towards South, Hunsur Taluk towards East, Somvarpet Taluk towards North, Madikeri Taluk towards west .

Madikeri and Mysore are the nearby Cities to Kundanahalli.

== Demographics ==
The local language is Kannada. The population is 675, in 164 houses. The female population is 52.3%. The male literacy rate is 69.2% and the female literacy rate is 33.6%. The Scheduled Tribe population is 139. The Scheduled Caste number 42. The working population is 60.6%. The under 7 population is 84, including 39 girls.

== Politics ==
JD(S), BJP and INC are the major political parties.

== Transport ==
=== Rail ===
The nearest railway station is more than 10 km away.

=== Road ===
Piriyapatna, Kushalnagar, Hunsur connect by road.

== See also ==
- Mysore
- Districts of Karnataka
