= Delhi Stock Exchange =

Stock exchange in New Delhi, India

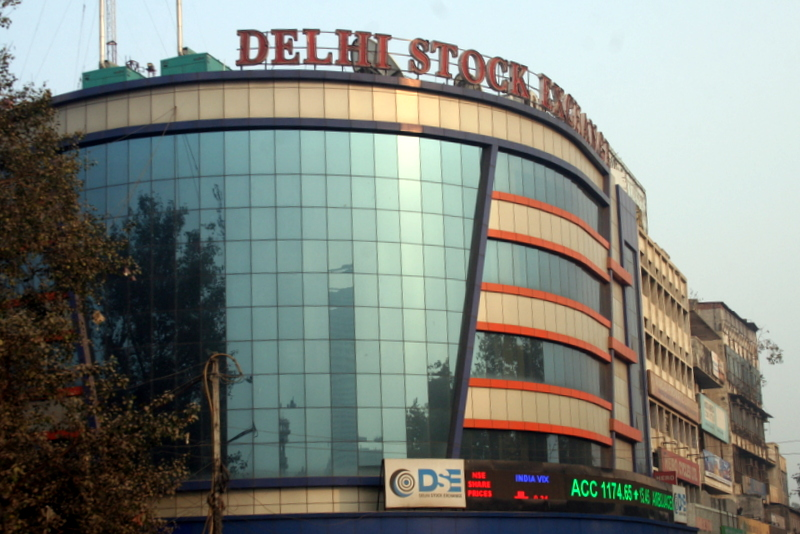
- Type: Stock Exchange
- Location: Delhi, India
- Founded: 25 June 1947
- Closed: January 2017
- Owner: Government of India (100%)
- Currency: Indian rupee (₹)

Delhi Stock Exchange (DSE) was a stock exchange located in New Delhi.

It was incorporated on 25 June 1947 and was allowed to exit business by SEBI in January 2017.

The exchange is an amalgamation of Delhi Stock and Share Brokers' Association Limited and the Delhi Stocks and Shares Exchange Limited. It was India's fifth exchange and was one of the premier stock exchanges in India.

The Delhi Stock Exchange was well connected to 50 cities with terminals in North India and had over 3,000 listed companies. It had received the market regulator's permission from BSE and had become a member. It used to facilitate the DSE members to trade on the BSE terminals. The exchange was also considered the same from NSE.

Delhi Stock Exchange has paired up with the National Securities Depository Limited (NSDL), and commenced trading in dematerialised shares. This started September, 1988. However, the option for delivering shares either in physical or demat form started in November 1998. DSE initialised its ₹1.25 billion Trade Guarantee Fund on 27 July 1998. TGF guarantees all the transactions of the DSE interse through the stock exchange. If a member fails to honour the settlement commitment, TGF undertakes to fulfil the commitment and complete all the settlement without disruption.

== See also ==
- List of South Asian stock exchanges
- List of stock exchanges in the Commonwealth of Nations
