= ASF Insignia =

- Interactive map of ASF Insignia
- Coordinates: 28.4336°N 77.1468°E
- Country: India
- State: Haryana
- District: Gurgaon
- Metro: NCR

Languages
  - Official: English, Hindi
- Time zone: UTC+5:30 (IST)
- PIN: 122003

ASF Insignia is an ITES Special Economic Zone (SEZ) situated in the Gurgaon, India. The zone consists three mega IT/ITES office buildings named Kings Canyon, Grand Canyon and Black Canyon, approximately 3.5 million sq ft space.
