= Kundalahalli =

Urban area in Karnataka, India

Kundalahalli Brookefield
- Suburb
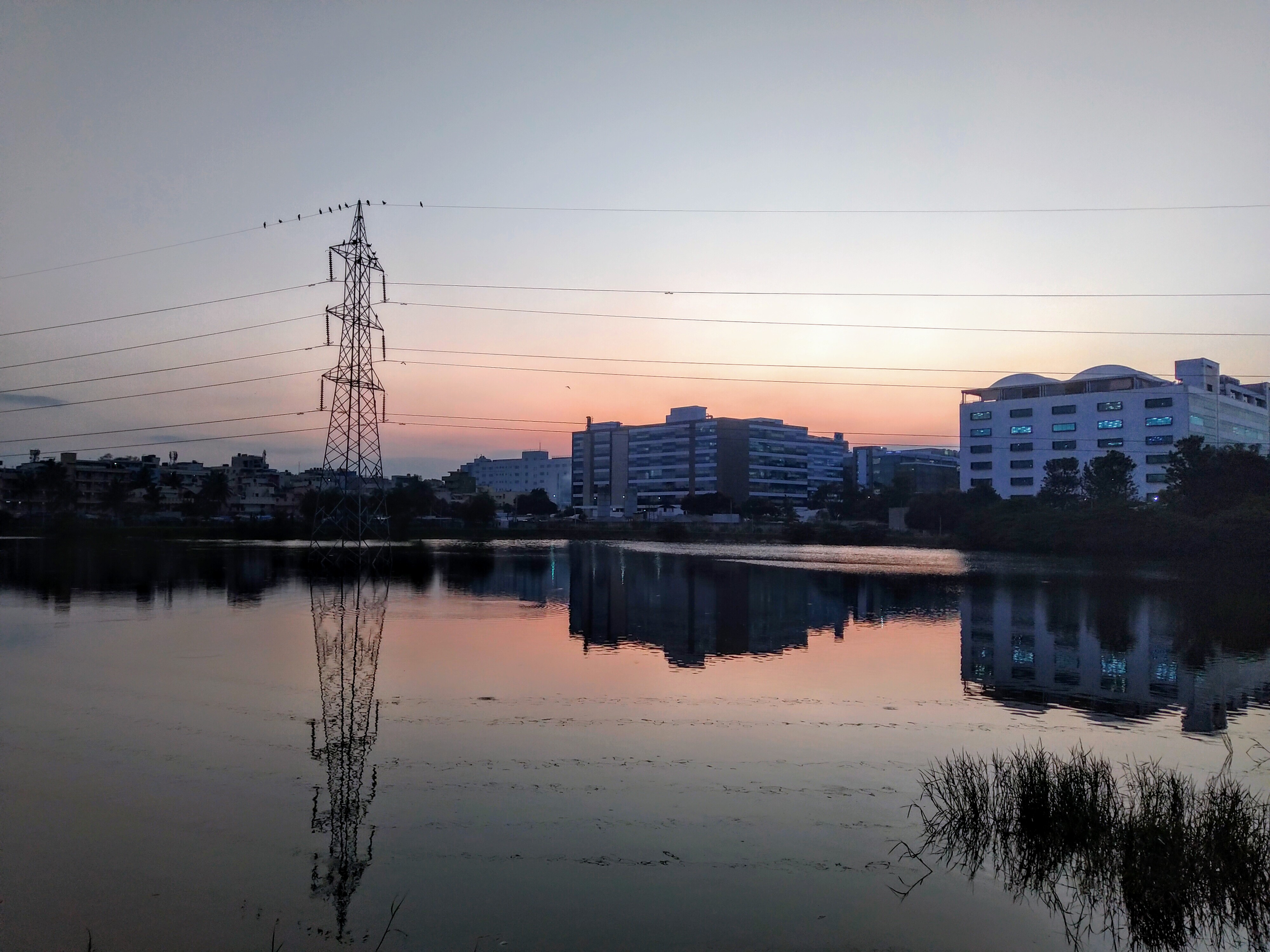
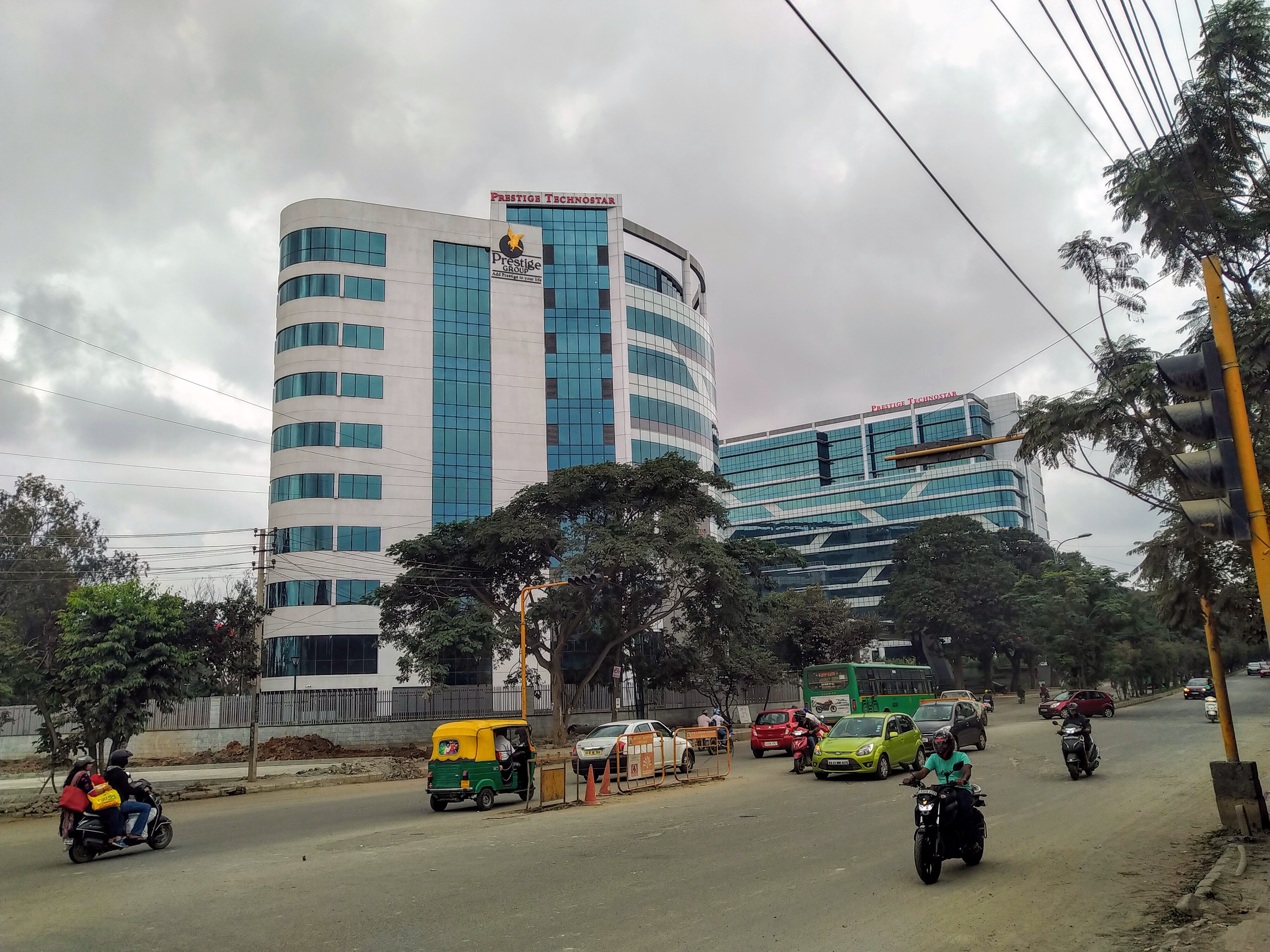
- (From top) Kundalahalli Lake, Prestige Technostar

- Location within Bengaluru
- Coordinates: 12.965601°N 77.718204°E
- Country: India
- State: Karnataka
- District: Bangalore
- Metro: Bengaluru

Languages
  - Official: Kannada
- Time zone: UTC+5:30 (IST)
- PIN: 560037
- Telephone code: 080
- Vehicle registration: KA-61

Kundalahalli is an eastern suburb of Bengaluru city in State of Karnataka. All the major IT-related office is located here. The PIN code of Kundalahalli is 560037.

== Connectivity ==
A six-lane railway overbridge near Marathahalli Junction connects the Kundalahalli area and HAL Airport Road. Kundalahalli junction (aka Kundalahalli Gate), is a gateway to the Tech corridor. The route is important for commuters between the city and Whitefield and is known for congested traffic, especially during the construction of the overbridge from 2019. The nearest metro station is Kundalahalli of purple line. The signal free corridor project between Kundalahalli and Trinity circle, started in 2012, was not completed even after 12 years.

In October 2022, a key route to the IT hub, the Kundalahalli underpass, which was constructed by the Bruhat Bengaluru Mahanagara Palike in June at a cost of Rs.19.45 crore collapsed after three months due to water seepage.
