= Visakhapatnam Special Economic Zone =

Central government economic zone in Visakhapatnam

Coordinates: 17.708293°N 83.152687°E

- Type: Special economic zone
- Founded: 1989
- Headquarters: Visakhapatnam, India
- Products: Multi-product (Electronic goods, software, pharmaceuticals etc.)
- Owner: Government of India

Visakhapatnam Special Economic Zone (VSEZ), also called the Andhra Pradesh First Economic Zone, is one of the central government special economic zones in India. VSEZ is located in Duvvada, 20 km away from the Visakhapatnam.

== History ==
The zone originated in 1989, when it was named VEPZ (Visakhapatnam Export Processing Zone). It was changed to the Visakapatnam Special Economic Zone on 1 January 2003. The zone consists of an area of 360 acres. The Development Commissioner, the administrative head of the zone, is also the head of all 53 special economic zones in Andhra Pradesh, Chhattisgarh and the union territory of Yanam. From these SEZs, seven are multipurpose SEZs, and the remaining are sector specific SEZs.

== Operation ==
VSEZ is treated as a foreign territory for trade operations, duties and tariffs. One hundred per cent foreign direct investment is allowed with permission for full and free repatriation of export proceeds. The turnover of the zone was Rs. 4.5 billion in 2004. Investments increased from Rs. 5.56 billion in 2008-09 to Rs. 12.4 billion in 2012-2013.

== See also ==
- Andhra Pradesh Special Economic Zone
- Economy of Visakhapatnam
