= Atchutapuram =

- Neighbourhood
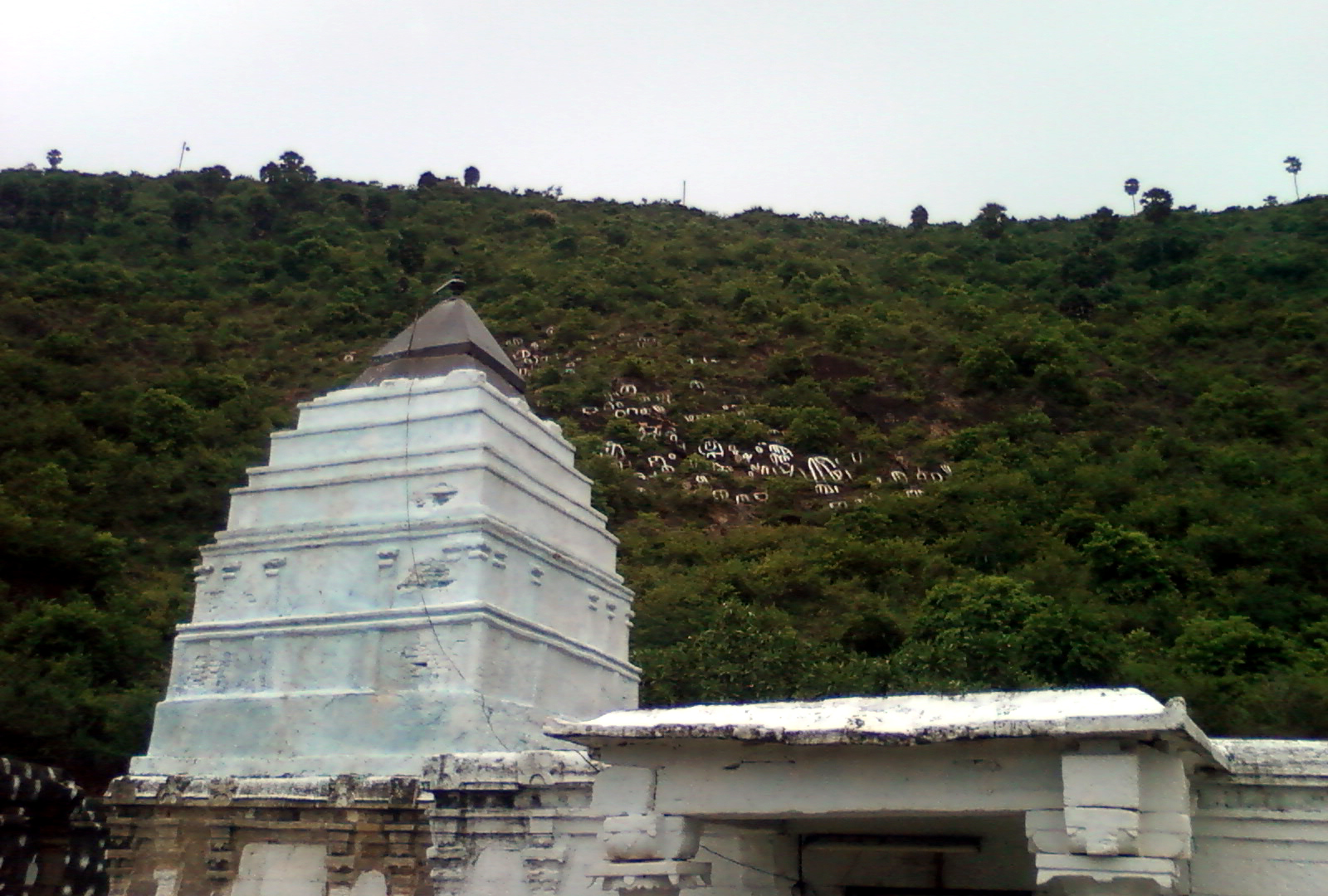
- Dharapalem Temple near Atchutapuram

- Location in Andhra Pradesh
- Coordinates: 17°33′42″N 82°58′28″E
- Country: India
- State: Andhra Pradesh
- District: Anakapalli

Area
  - Total: 129.7 km^{2} (50.1 sq mi)

Population
  - Total: 66,151
  - Density: 510.0/km^{2} (1,321/sq mi)

Languages
  - Official: Telugu
- Time zone: UTC+5:30 (IST)
- Vehicle Registration: AP31 (Former); AP39 (from 30 January 2019)

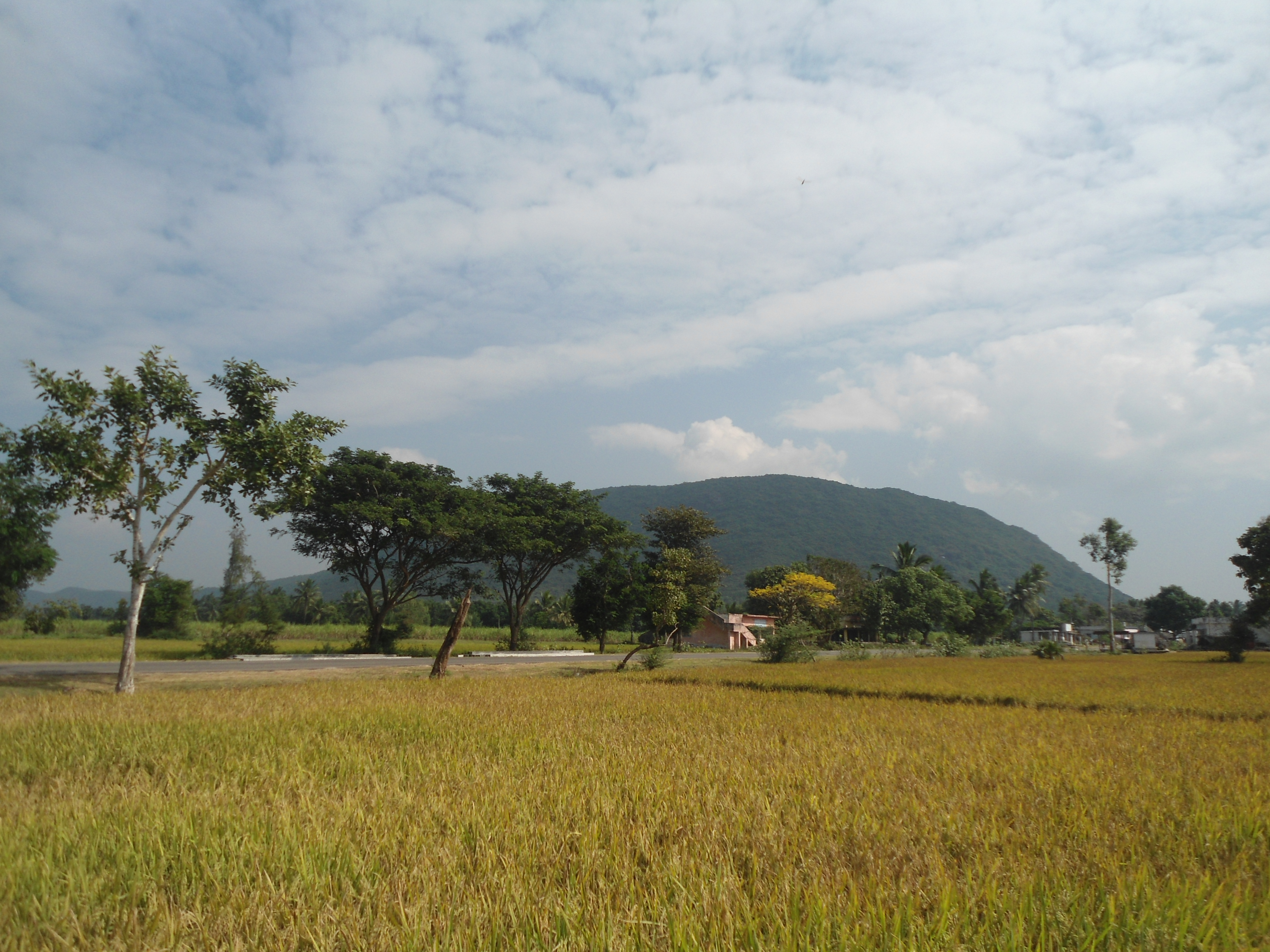
Paddy Fields at Kondakarla in Achutapuram mandal

Atchutapuram is a neighborhood in Visakhapatnam and is part of Anakapalli district, in the Indian state of Andhra Pradesh.

Achuthapuram has a population of 66,151 people and has area of 129.7 square kilometres. It was officially established as a major economic zone on April 12, 2007, when the Government of India formally notified the Andhra Pradesh Special Economic Zone (APSEZ) at Atchutapuram in the national gazette.

== Population ==
Atchutapuram has a population of 66,151 people with 33,327 males and 32,825 females.

== Transport ==
APSRTC routes

Route number	Start	End	Via
500A	Atchutapuram	RTC Complex	Anakapalle, Lankelapalem, Kurmannaplem, Old Gajuwaka, BHPV, Airport, NAD Kotharoad, Birla Junction, Gurudwar
777	Atchutapuram	RTC Complex	Anakapalle, Lankelapalem, Kurmannaplem, Old Gajuwaka, BHPV, Airport, NAD Kotharoad, Birla Junction, Gurudwar
568	Brandix	Simhachalam	Atchutapuram, Anakapalle, Sankaram, Sabbavaram, Pinagadi, Vepagunta
