= Parawada =

- Neighbourhood
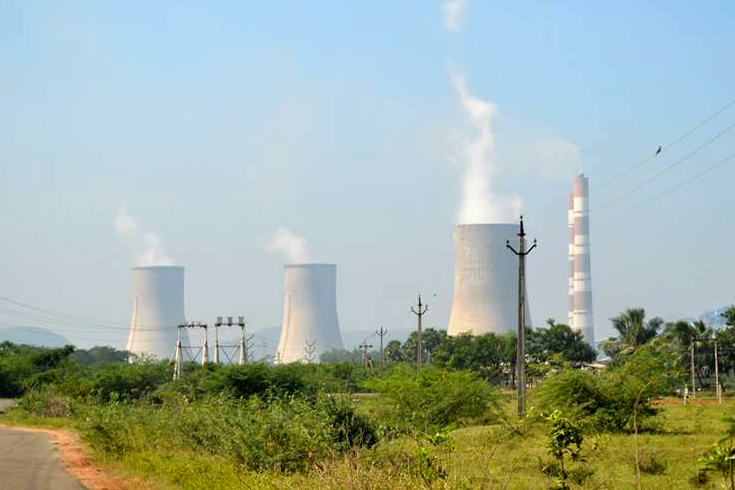
- NTPC simhadri beside Ravada

- Location in Visakhapatnam Parawada (Andhra Pradesh)
- Coordinates: 17.6333°N 83.1000°E
- Country: India
- State: Andhra Pradesh
- District: Anakapalli

Government
  - Body: Greater Viskhapatnam Municipal corporation

Area
  - Total: 129.68 km^{2} (50.07 sq mi)
- Elevation: 19 m (62 ft)

Population (2011)
  - Total: 78,165
  - Density: 602.75/km^{2} (1,561.1/sq mi)

Languages
  - Official: Telugu
- Time zone: UTC+5:30 (IST)
- PIN: 531021
- Vehicle Registration: AP31, AP32, AP33 (Former); AP39 (from 30 January 2019)

Parawada is a mandal in Anakapalli district in the state of Andhra Pradesh in India.

== Geography ==
Paravada was assembly constituency until 2009. It is located at 17.6333°N 83.1°E. It has an average elevation of 19 meters (65 feet).

== Members of Legislative Assembly ==
- 1951 - Mullapadi Veerabhadram
- 1955 - Eti Nagayya
- 1962 - Salapu China Appala Naidu
- 1967 - S. R. A. S. Appala Naidu, Indian National Congress
- 1972 - Bhattam Srirama Murthy, Indian National Congress
- 1978 - Bhattam Srirama Murthy, Indian National Congress
- 1983 - Paila Appala Naidu, Telugu Desam Party
- 1985 - Paila Appala Naidu, Telugu Desam Party
- 1989 - Bandaru Satyanarayana Murthy, Telugu Desam Party
- 1994 - Bandaru Satyanarayana Murthy, Telugu Desam Party
- 1999 - Bandaru Satyanarayana Murthy, Telugu Desam Party
- 2004 - Gandi Babji, Indian National Congress

== Transport ==
APSRTC routes

Route number	Start	End	Via
744	Dosuru	RTC Complex	Parawada, Lankelapalem, Kurmannaplem, Old Gajuwaka, BHPV, Airport, NAD Kotharoad, Birla Junction, Gurudwar
747	Vada Chipurupalle	RTC Complex	Parawada, Anakapalle, Lankelapalem, Kurmannaplem, Old Gajuwaka, BHPV, Airport, NAD Kotharoad, Birla Junction, Gurudwar
844	Kollivanipalem	Collector Office	NTPC, Parawada, Lankelapalem, Kurmannapalem, Gajuwaka, Malkapuram, Scindia, Town Kotharoad, Jagadamba
