= Andhra Pradesh Special Economic Zone =

Industrial SEZ in Visakhapatnam, India

Coordinates: 17.534293°N 82.987588°E

- Type: Special Economic Zone
- Founded: 2007
- Headquarters: Atchutapuram, Visakhapatnam, India
- Products: Multi-product
- Owner: Government of Andhra Pradesh

Andhra Pradesh Special Economic Zone or APSEZ is an Industrial special economic zone situated in the city of Visakhapatnam, India.

== Location ==
Andhra Pradesh Special Economic Zone is located in Atchutapuram

== Details ==
It is a multi product SEZ and Andhra Pradesh State's largest SEZ; it spreads over 5595.47 acres.

== See also ==
- Visakhapatnam Special Economic Zone
