= Infopark =

Infopark or InfoPark may refer to one of the following IT-focused business parks in India:

- Infopark, Cherthala, in Cherthala, Alappuzha district
- Infopark, Kochi, located in the Kakkanad region of Kochi, Ernakulam district
- Infopark, Thrissur, in Koratty, Thrissur district
