= Pilgrimage centres near Ernakulam city =

Western part of Kochi, Kerala, India

Ernakulam refers to the western part of the mainland of Kochi city in Kerala, India. Ernakulam is the most urbanised part of Kochi and has lent its name to Ernakulam District.

== Pilgrimage centres ==
- St. Mary's Syro-Malabar Catholic Church, Roman Church Syro-Malabar Rite, Kanjoor, one of the historic Churches in India.
- St. Francis CSI Church: First church constructed by the Portuguese in India. Located at Fort Cochin.
- St. Francis Assisi Cathedral Roman Catholic Latin Church, Archdiocese of Verapoly, Church Road, Marine Drive, Ernakulam, Kochi.
- St. Francis Xavier's Roman Catholic Church Latin Rite, Kaloor.
- St. Antony's Shrine, Roman Catholic Church Latin Rite, Kaloor.
- St.Philomena's Forane Church, Koonammavu & St. Chavara Pilgrimage, Archdiocese of Verapoly, a Roman Catholic Church Latin Rite, Koonammavu, Cochin.
- St. Antony's Shrine Chettikkad,, Roman Catholic Church Latin Rite, Archdiocese of Kottapuram, Chettikkad, Maliankkara.
- St. Mary's Syro-Malabar Catholic Cathedral Basilica, Ernakulam.
- Jewish Synagogue: Built in 1568 at Mattancherry. Chinese ceramics and Old Testament are attractions here.
- Ernakulam Shiva Temple: Located at Ernakulam. Dedicated to Lord Shiva.
- Tirumala Temple: Located at Ernakulam.
- Guruvayoor Temple: 80 km from Ernakulam. One of the most important temples in Kerala. The temple is dedicated to Lord Sri Krishna.
- Kaladi Sankarachaya Mutt: 40 km from Ernakulam.
- Saint Thomas Syro-Malabar Catholic Church, Malayattoor: About 50 km from Ernakulam.
- St. George's Syro-Malabar Catholic Forane Church, Edappally: A famous Syro-Malabar Catholic Church In Kerala. Located at Edapally near Ernakulam.
- Vamanamurthy Temple: An ancient temple located at Trikkakara near Ernakulam. This temple is associated with Onam festival, the most important festival celebrated in Kerala.
- Our Lady of Ransom Shrine Basilica, National Shrine(Latin Church of Vallarpadathamma): Situated in Vallarpadom island off Ernakulam. Two bridges connect the island with the mainland Ernakulam.
- St. Thomas Church, Thumpoly a marian pilgrimage site. It's 50 kilometers from ernakulam.
- St. Joseph's Church, Thevara mainly known for the miracles that are said to happen there. According to tradition, if anyone attends St. Jude's Novena prayer for continuous 9 weeks (Thursdays) their wishes will be fulfilled.
- Korattymuthy's Church (St. Mary's Forane Church), Koratty. 40 km from Ernakulam.

== See also ==
- Ernakulam town
- Ernakulam district
