= Thevakkal =

Thevakkal Vadacode
- suburb
- Location in Kerala, India Thevakkal (India)
- Coordinates: 10°2′0″N 76°21′0″E
- Country: India
- State: Kerala
- District: Ernakulam

Languages
  - Official: Malayalam, English
- Time zone: UTC+5:30 (IST)
- Vehicle registration: KL-07
- Nearest city: Ernakulam

Thevakkal is a suburban locality in Ernakulam district, Kerala, India. InfoPark, Kochi is located 2 kilometers from Thevakkal.

== Educational institutes ==
Vidyodaya School is a private college-preparatory combined-grades school located in Thevakkal, Kochi, India. It provides comprehensive school education from lower primary to grade 12. As a co-educational school with lessons being taught in English, Vidyodaya follows the Central Board of Secondary Education prescribed syllabus. It was founded in 1990 under the management of Vidyodaya Educational and Charitable Trust. The first group of students from Vidyodaya graduated in 1997.

== Places of worship ==
- Ponnakudam Bhagavathy Temple
- Maniyathrakkavu Durga Bhadrakali Temple.
