= Koratty railway station =

Railway station in Kerala, India

Koratty

General information
- Location: Koratty, Kerala, India
- Coordinates: 10.2605°N 76.3565°E
- System: Indian Railways station
- Owner: Indian Railways
- Line: Shoranur–Cochin Harbour section
- Platforms: 2
- Tracks: 2

Construction
- Structure type: Standard on-ground station
- Parking: Yes
- Cycle facilities: No

Other information
- Station code: KRAN
- Fare zone: Southern Railway

History
- Opened: 2 June 1902; 124 years ago

Services
Preceding station	Indian Railways	Following station
Chalakudi towards Shoranur Junction	Southern Railway zone Shoranur–Cochin Harbour section	Koratty towards Cochin Harbour Terminus
Route map
Location
- Location within India Location within Kerala

Koratty railway station (station code: KRAN), which also known as 'Koratti Angadi' falls between Divine Nagar railway station and Karukutty railway station in the busy Shoranur–Cochin Harbour section in Thrissur district.Koratty railway station is an "HG-1" railway station that comes under the Thiruvananthapuram division of Southern Railways. All passenger trains stop here.

== Trains stoppage in Koratty ==
No.	Train no.	Origin	Destination	Train name
1.	56361/56364	SRR	ERS	Shornur ↔ Ernakulam South Passenger
2.	56365/56366	GUV	EDN	Guruvayur ↔ Edumun Fast Passenger
3.	66611/66612	PGT	ERS	Palakkad ↔ Ernakulam South MEMU
4.	56375/56376	GUV	ERS	Guruvayoor ↔ Ernakulam South Passenger
5.	56363/56362	NIL	ERS	Nilambur ↔ Ernakulam South Passenger
6.	56371/56370	ERS	GUV	Guruvayoor ↔ Ernakulam South Passenger
