= World Trade Center, Kochi =

World Trade Center Kochi
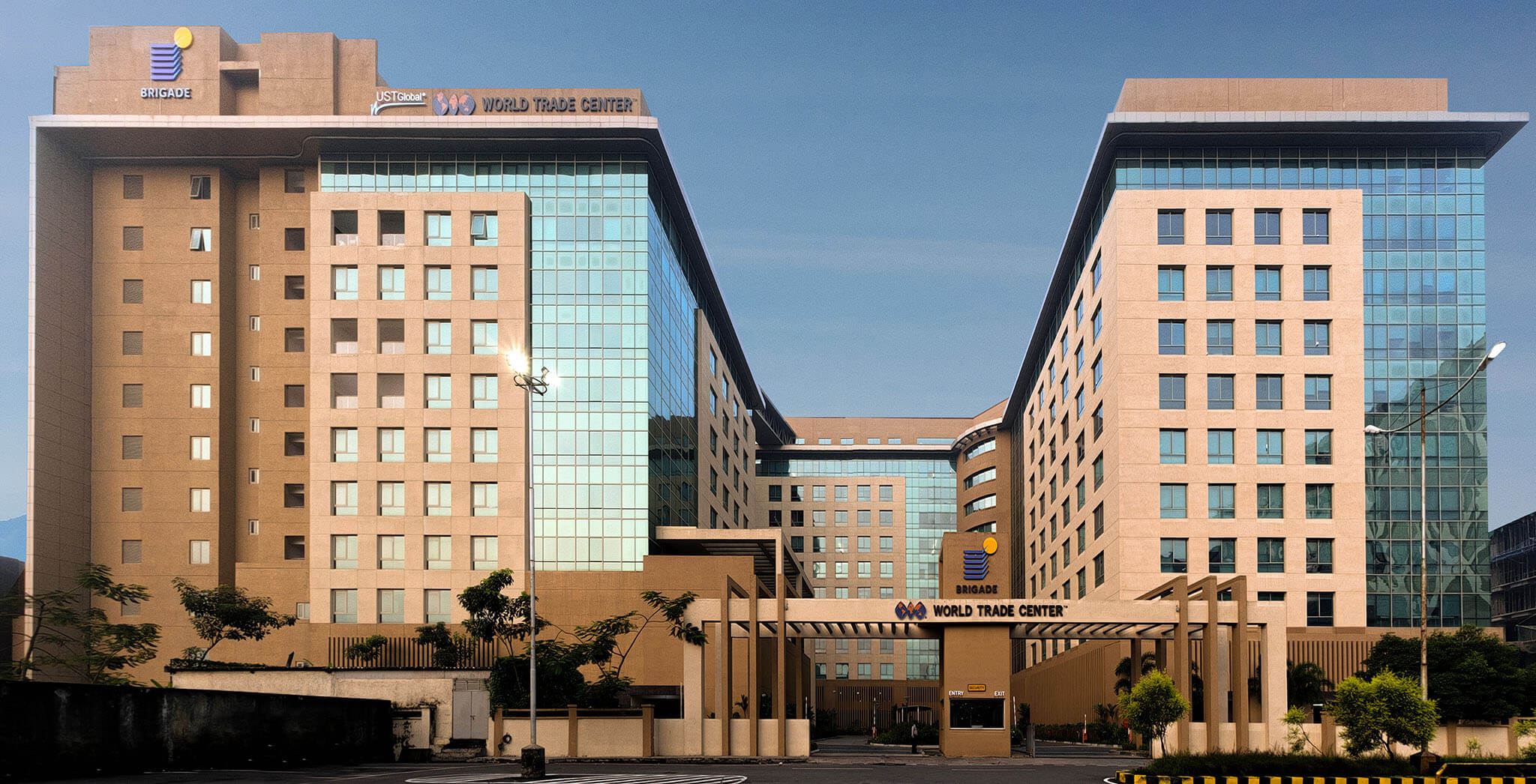
- World Trade Center Complex at Kochi

General information
- Type: Commercial
- Location: InfoPark Kochi, Kerala, India
- Coordinates: 10.0076°N 76.3642°E
- Completed: 2016
- Owner: Brigade Group

Technical details
- Floor count: B+G+10 (Twin towers); G+16 (Third tower) - Under Construction
- Floor area: 770,000 sq.ft (operational); 260,000 sq.ft (under construction)

Website
- WTCKochi.org

The World Trade Center Kochi is a twin tower commercial complex located in InfoPark, Kochi, India. Opened in 2016, it is the fourth World Trade Center in India and second in South India after the World Trade Center Bengaluru.

Located inside Infopark Phase I campus in the Information technology hub of Kakkanad, the complex houses multinational corporations like IBM, Accenture, KPMG, Xerox, IQVIA, EXL, Nielsen and UST. KPMG has taken up more than 260,000 square feet of office space at tower 1 employing more than 2,500 professionals from this facility.

The WTC Kochi center is spread across 770,000 square feet (72,000 m^{2}) in two towers each of 10 storeys. The complex was built by Brigade Group who holds the WTCA licenses for all the major South Indian cities.

As part of phase 2 expansion of WTC Kochi, in June 2024, the promoter Brigade Group signed an agreement with InfoPark to construct a 16-storey third building complex with a built-up area of 260,000 square feet. Once completed, the total built-up area of WTC Kochi will exceed 1 million square feet across three towers.

== See also ==
- Infopark, Kochi
- SmartCity, Kochi
- List of World Trade Centers
- List of tallest buildings in Kochi
- Lulu IT Twin Towers
