= InfoPark Kochi =

IT Park situated in Kochi, India

Infoparks Kerala
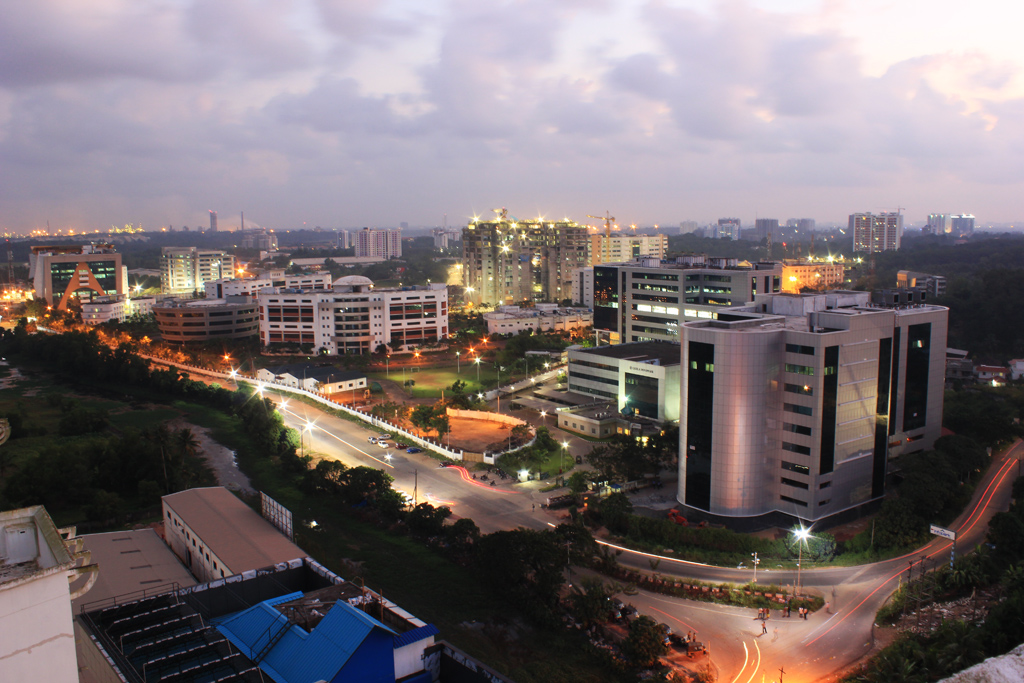
- Aerial view of Infopark Phase I in 2012
- Type: Government Owned
- Industry: Information Technology Business Park
- Genre: Infrastructure Service Provider
- Founded: 18 July 2004; 22 years ago
- Headquarters: Kochi, India
- Number of locations: Kochi, Thrissur, Cherthala
- Key people: Chief Minister of Kerala (Chairman), Susanth Kurunthil (CEO)
- Owner: Government of Kerala
- Number of employees: 72,000 (2025)
- Website: https://infopark.in/

Infopark Kochi is an information technology park in the city of Kochi, Kerala, India. Established in 2004 by the Government of Kerala, the park is spread over 323 acres (131 ha) of campus across two phases, housing 582 companies which employ about 72,000 professionals as of 2025.

The phase 1 campus is fully developed spread over a 101 acres (40.9 ha) with more than 7.6 million sq ft (710 thousand m^{2}) of operational built-up space. The phase 2 campus is spread over 160 acres (64.7 ha) of campus area which would have a total built-up space of 8 million sq ft (740 thousand m^{2}) upon completion and is expected to employ more than 100,000 professionals. The expansion of the park through Phases 3 and 4 has already been announced. Phase 3 is planned as an "AI Native city" spanning approximately 565 acres (228.6 ha). Phase 4 is a planned 33.5 acres (13.6 ha) mixed-use IT and commercial township project located at Irumpanam and may be completed earlier than Phase 3.

The notable tenants in the park include Indian technology giants like TCS, Wipro, HCLTech, Tech Mahindra, UST, LTTS and foreign corporations like IBM, EY, Cognizant, KPMG, Accenture, IQVIA, Xerox, Conduent, NOV, Invesco, EXL, Hubbell, Alight, Gallagher, Nielsen, Geodis etc. The park today is home to more technology majors than any other location in Kerala. Phases 1 and 2 of Infopark are situated adjacent to SmartCity Kochi in Kakkanad, together constituting a contiguous technology park region covering more than 500 acres (202.3 ha).

The Infopark campus currently has 9.2 million sq ft (850 thousand m^{2}) of built-up area and is the major contributor of IT export revenue from the state of Keralam. IT exports from Infopark which stood at ₹32 billion (US$330 million) in 2016–17, quadrupled in a period of 8 years, rising to ₹120.6 billion (US$1.3 billion) in 2024–25. A huge real estate boom was triggered soon after Infopark started to attract big MNCs from around the globe. Infopark changed the landscape and lifestyle of Kochi, particularly the Kakkanad area. A new culture got evolved and more and more commercial and residential ventures started to rise up which then extended the limits of Kochi city to further north end.

The park is built on the 'Hub and Spoke model' for the development of the Information Technology industry in Keralam. Infopark acts as the hub to the spokes located at Thrissur and Cherthala.

== Location and connectivity ==
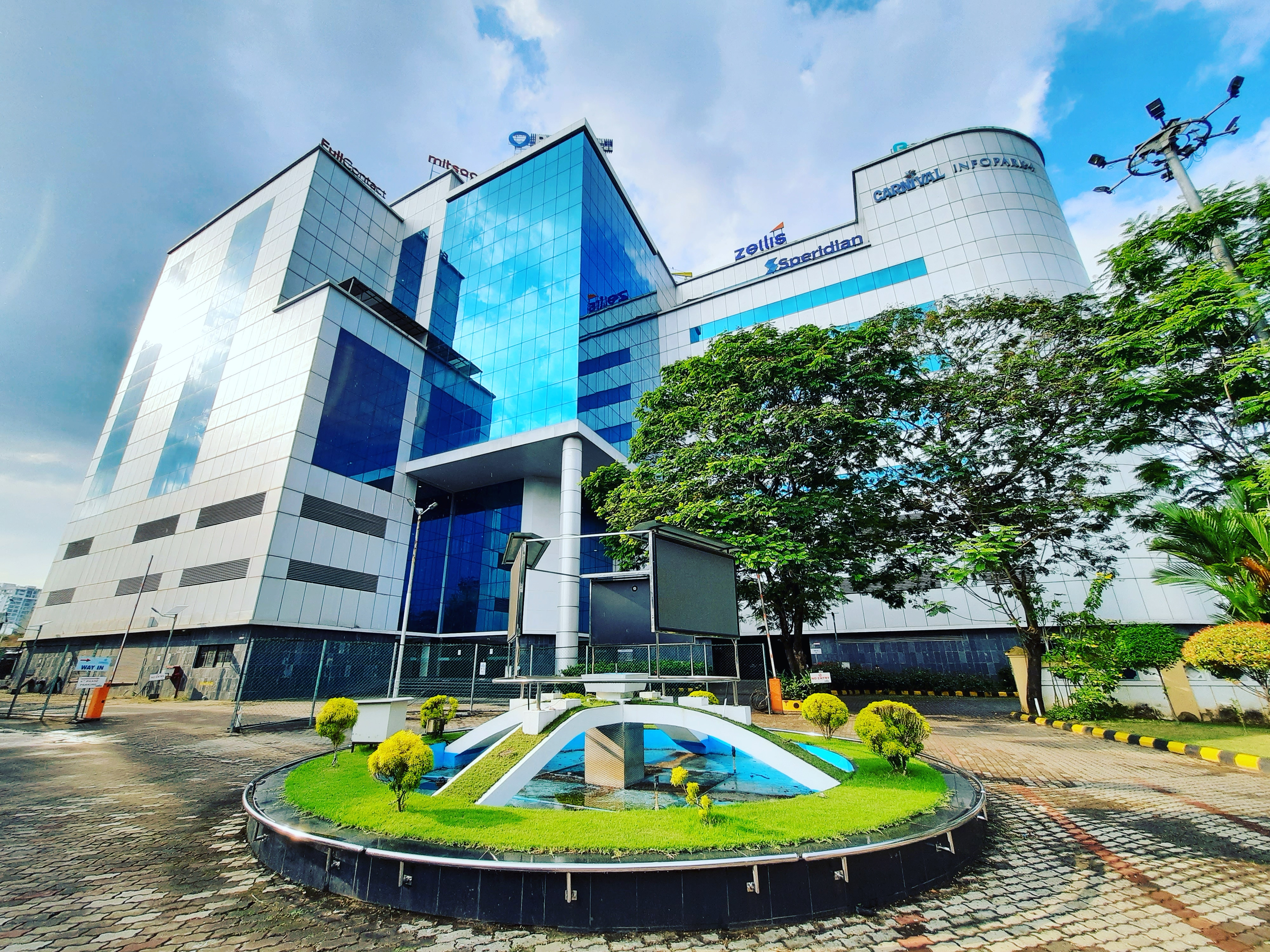
Carnival Infopark Kochi on Dec 8, 2020

Infopark is 10 kilometres (6 mi) from downtown Kochi and 22 kilometres (14 mi) from Cochin International Airport. Infopark is connected to Seaport-Airport Road via the Infopark Expressway, a 4-lane road. Kerala State Water Transport Department operates boat service between Kakkanad and Vyttila Mobility Hub. The Ernakulam district administration, which comprise the city of Kochi has proposed a waterway connecting InfoPark to Marine Drive, Kochi.

The Infopark campus lies adjacent to SmartCity, Kochi, an information technology park.

VSNL's communication gateway is located close to Infopark. Two submarine cables, SAFE and SEA-ME-WE 3, have their landing points at the gateway. Infopark is directly linked by optical fiber to the gigabyte router of VSNL, which provides the park with 100% uptime data connectivity.

== Educational Institutions ==
The Indian Institute of Management Kozhikode (IIM–K) has set up its first satellite campus at the Athulya building in Infopark. The satellite campus initially offers a one-year residential executive MBA programme as well as two-year part-time programmes, in addition to several short and long-term management development programmes. The Government of Keralam has offered five acres of land for the full-fledged campus inside Infopark.

== Infrastructure ==
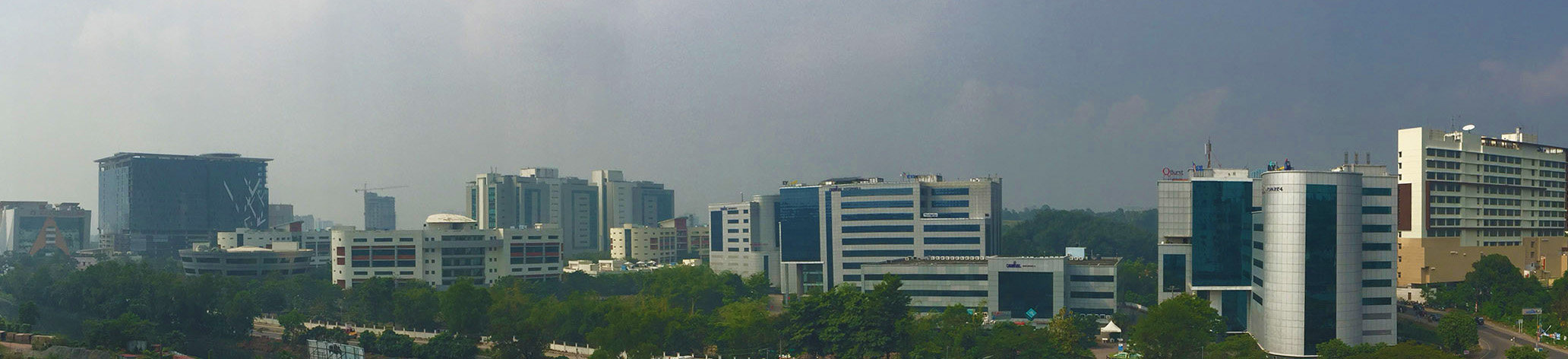
View towards Infopark Phase I in 2017

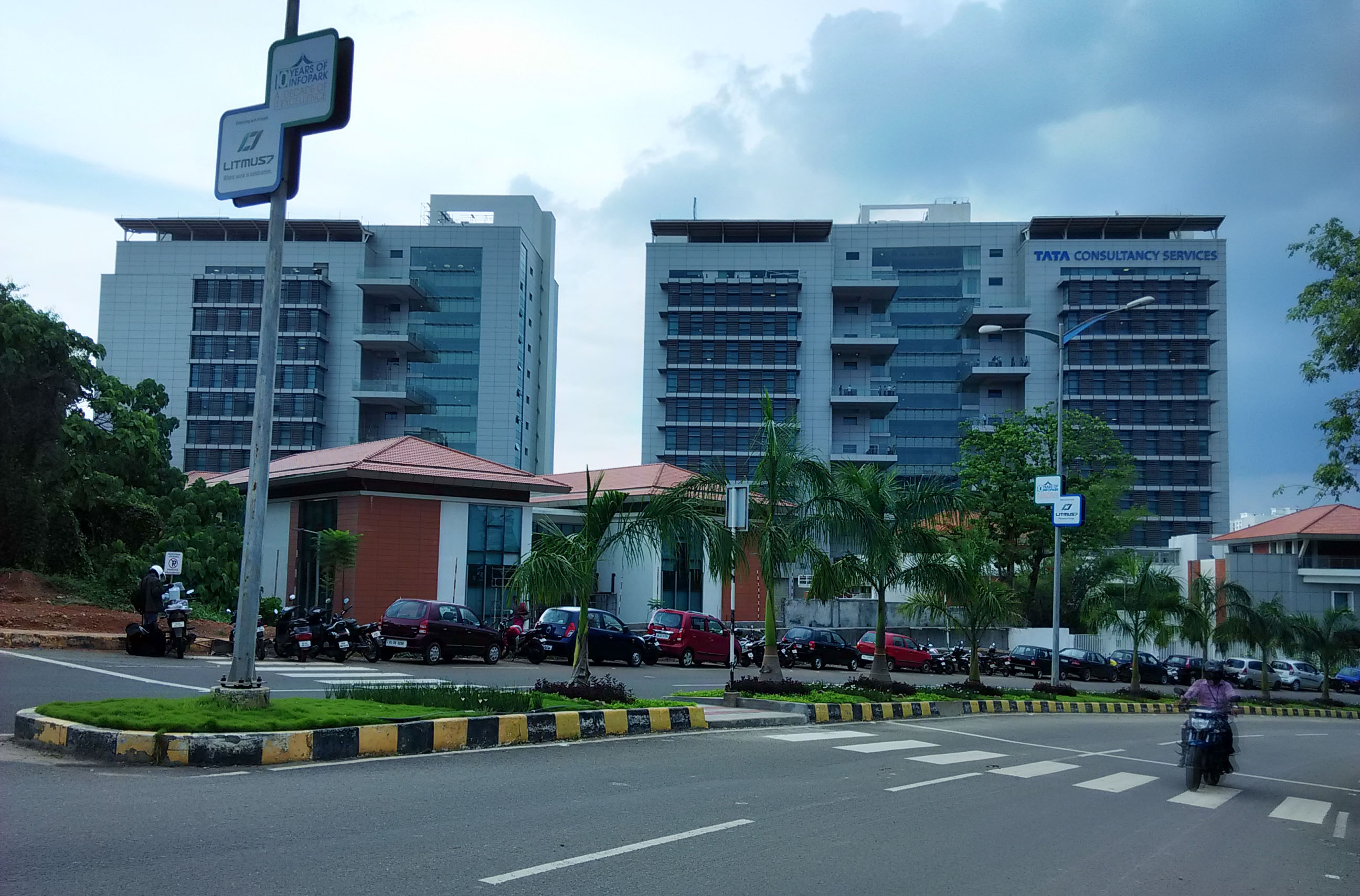
TCS Centre at Infopark Phase I

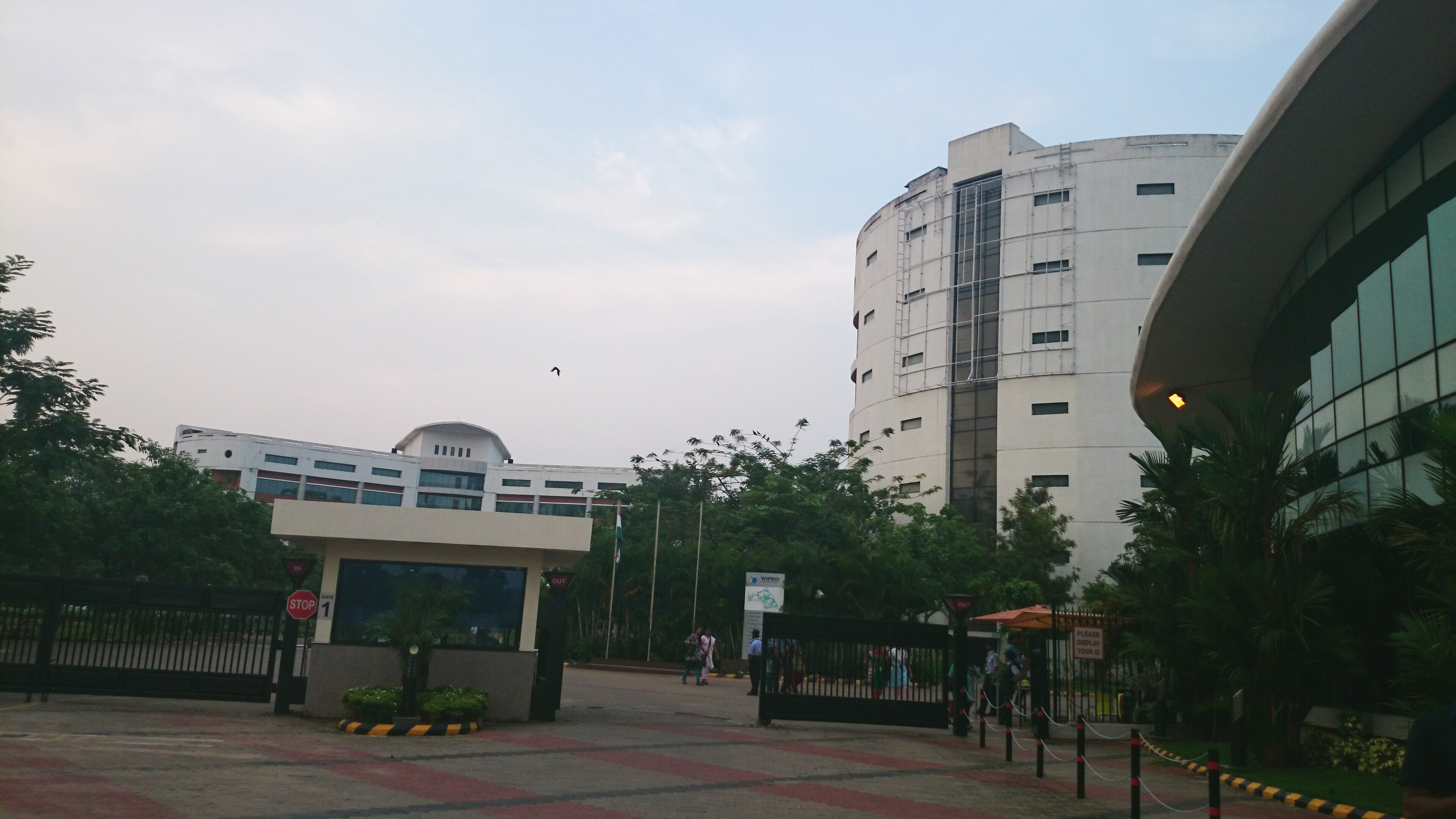
Wipro Campus Entrance at Infopark Phase I

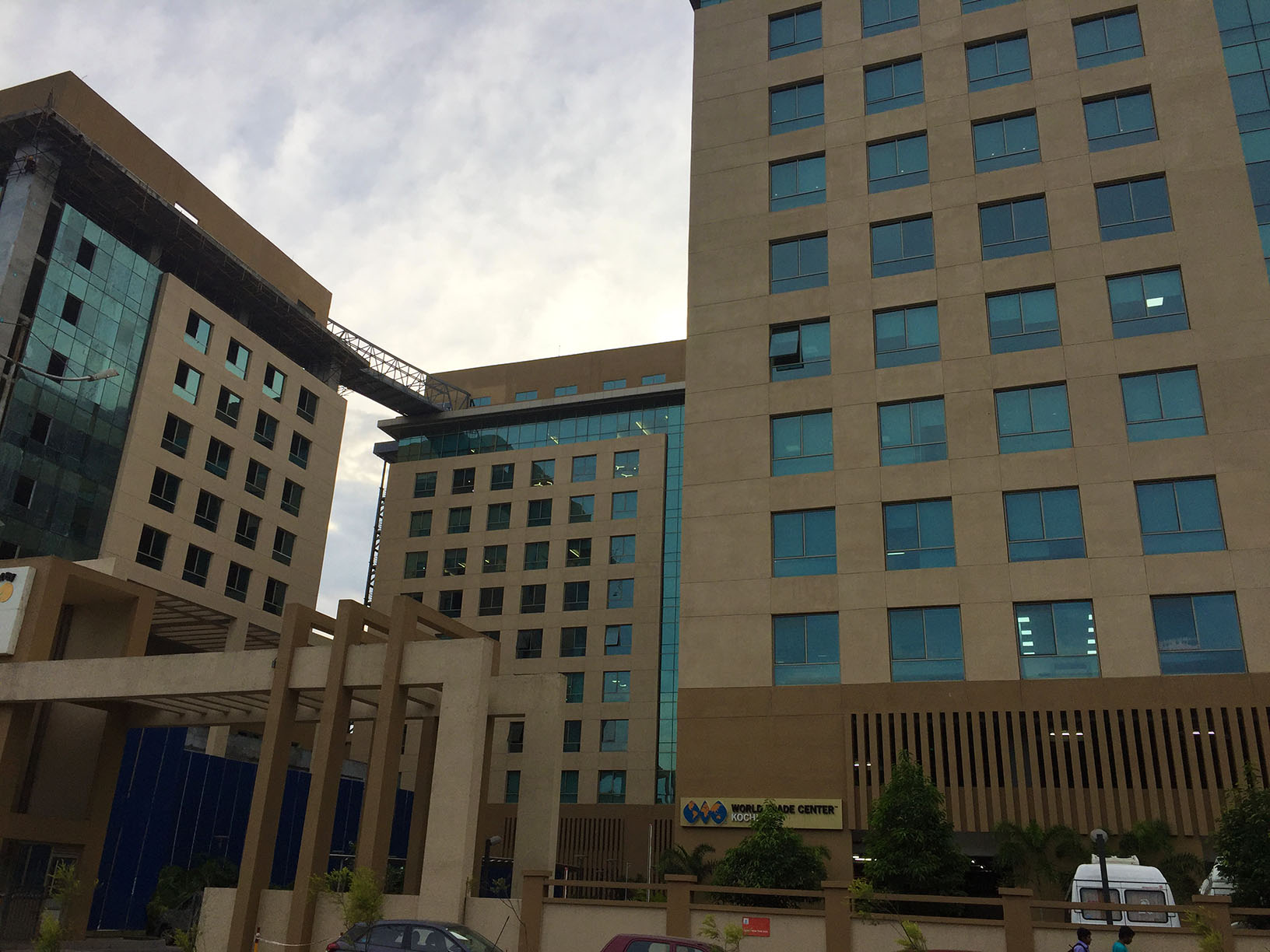
World Trade Center at Infopark Phase I is the second World Trade Center in South India

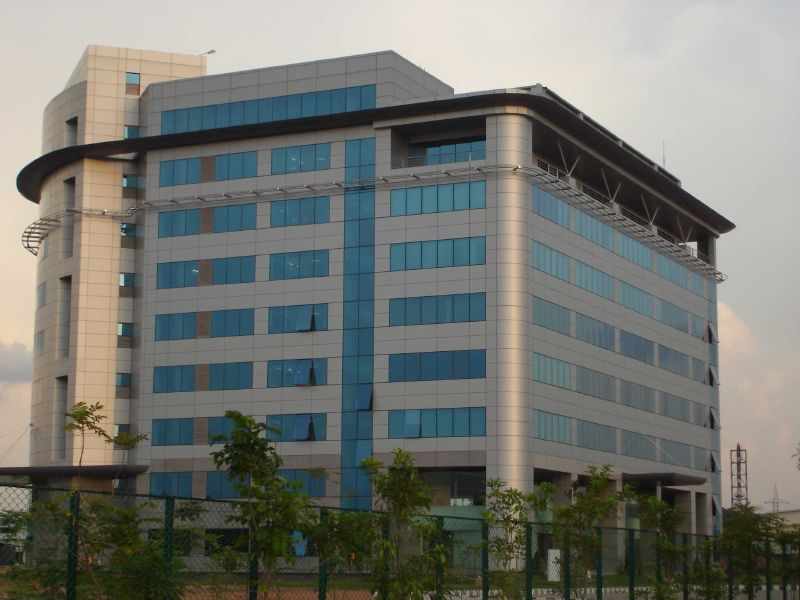
Vismaya building at Infopark Phase I

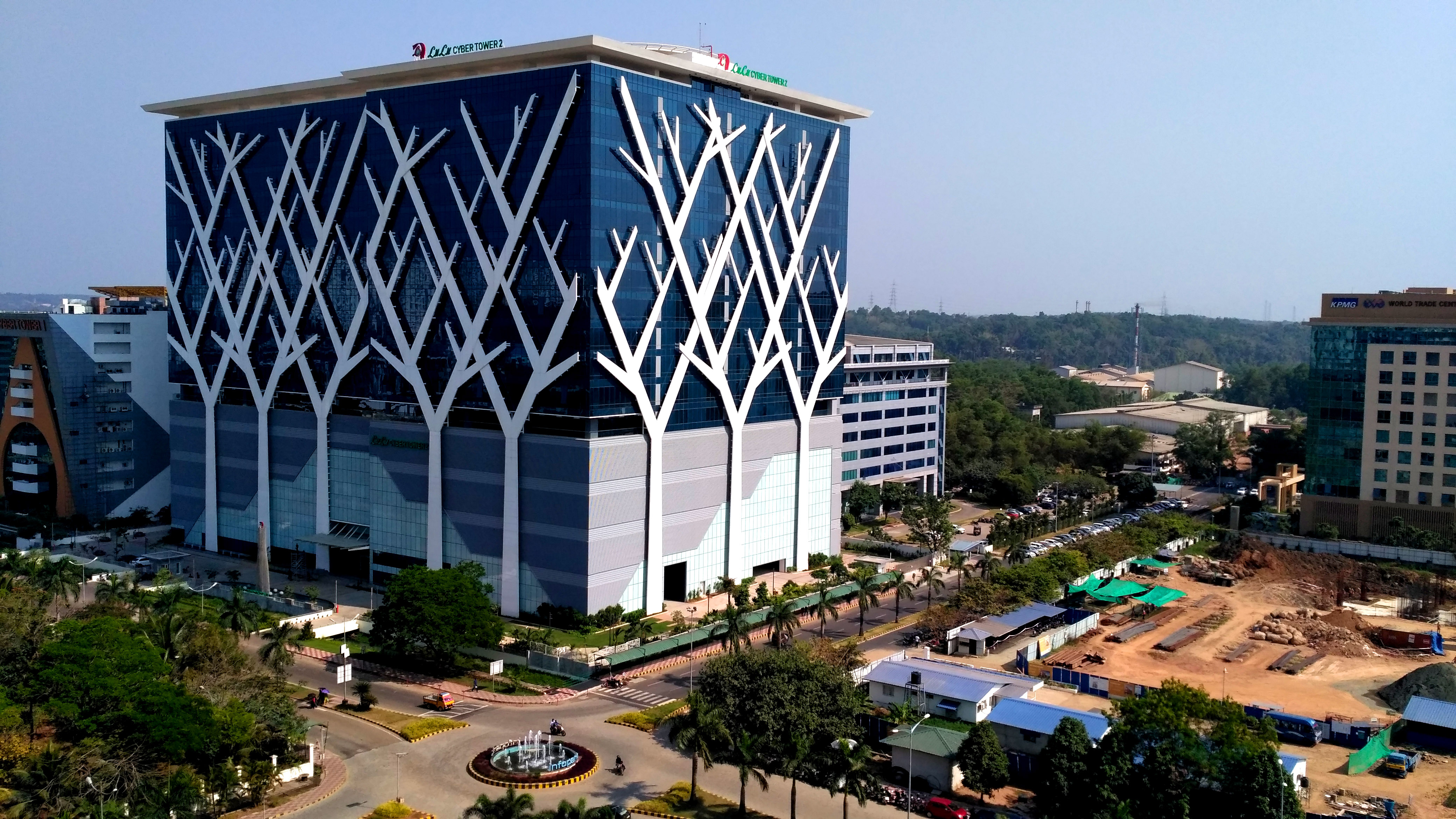
Lulu Cyber Tower 2 at Infopark Phase I

Infopark campus is divided into Special Economic Zone (SEZ) and non-SEZ facilities. Of the existing 98.25 acres of Infopark, 75 acres has been notified as a Special Economic Zone by the Ministry of Commerce, Government of India. The infrastructure developed in the park has been classified as Multi-tenanted facility (MTF) and Built-to-suit (BTS).

Apart from Infopark-owned infrastructure (Thapasya, Vismaya, Athulya), parallel developments by co-developers such as Leela Soft, L&T Techpark, and Brigade Enterprises are also taking shape in the campus. Thus offering IT companies a choice of office space solutions to fit their requirement and budget. Major Private IT campus by Wipro, TCS and IBS Software are also in progress. When Infopark Kochi Phase-I is fully developed a total super built-up area of 5 million sqft would be completed. The campus includes amenities such as food courts, banking counters, ATM, shopping arcade, etc.

In 2014, Leela Infopark, a non – SEZ facility owned by Leela Lace Holding Pvt Ltd was acquired by Mumbai-based Carnival Group for INR 280 Crores and the name of the project was changed to Carnival Infopark Lulu Group has acquired the L&T Tech Park for INR 150 Crores and the name of the project was changed to Lulu Tech Park.

Buildings in Infopark
Building	Infopark Phase	Built-up area	Year of commission
Infopark owned
Thapasya	Phase 1	135,755 sq ft (12,600 m^{2})	2004
Vismaya	Phase 1	207,586 sq ft (19,300 m^{2})	2005
Athulya	Phase 1	354,087 sq ft (32,900 m^{2})	2010
Athulya Annexe	Phase 1	51,047 sq ft (4,700 m^{2})	2010
Jyothirmaya	Phase 2	400,000 sq ft (37,200 m^{2})	2017
Private owned
Carnival Tower-1	Phase 1	132,331 sq ft (12,300 m^{2})	2004
LuLu Cyber Tower 1	Phase 1	400,000 sq ft (37,200 m^{2})	2008
Wipro Campus	Phase 1	1,000,000 sq ft (92,900 m^{2})	2008
Carnival Tower-2	Phase 1	326,080 sq ft (30,300 m^{2})	2009
Carnival Tower-3	Phase 1	161,853 sq ft (15,000 m^{2})	2010
Carnival Tower-4	Phase 1	251,562 sq ft (23,400 m^{2})	2012
TCS Campus	Phase 1	1,300,000 sq ft (120,800 m^{2})	2014
WTC Kochi Towers 1 & 2	Phase 1	770,000 sq ft (71,500 m^{2})	2016
Cognizant Campus	Phase 2	1,500,000 sq ft (139,400 m^{2})	2016
LuLu Cyber Tower 2	Phase 1	1,463,000 sq ft (135,900 m^{2})	2018
Trans Asia Cyber Park	Phase 2	600,000 sq ft (55,700 m^{2})	2018
ClaySys IT Campus	Phase 2	150,000 sq ft (13,900 m^{2})	2020
IBS Software Campus	Phase 1	600,000 sq ft (55,700 m^{2})	2024
Caspian Tower 1	Phase 2	150,000 sq ft (13,900 m^{2})	2025
Cloudscapes Cyber Park	Phase 2	60,000 sq ft (5,600 m^{2})	2025
Under Construction
Caspian Tower 2 & 3	Phase 2	300,000 sq ft (27,900 m^{2})	2026
UST Campus	Phase 2	600,000 sq ft (55,700 m^{2})	2027
Geojit Tower	Phase 2	350,000 sq ft (32,500 m^{2})	2028
WTC Kochi Tower 3	Phase 2	260,000 sq ft (24,200 m^{2})	2028
Under Planning
Caspian Project	Phase 2	500,000 sq ft (46,500 m^{2})	
Muthoot Project	Phase 2	850,000 sq ft (79,000 m^{2})	
Lulu Tower	Phase 2	950,000 sq ft (88,300 m^{2})	
Padiyath Innovations	Phase 2	1,000,000 sq ft (92,900 m^{2})	

Smart Business Centre (SBC) is provided to facilitate Indian and foreign IT/ITES and knowledge based companies to commence operations immediately from a plug and play facility at Infopark.

== Infopark Phase II ==
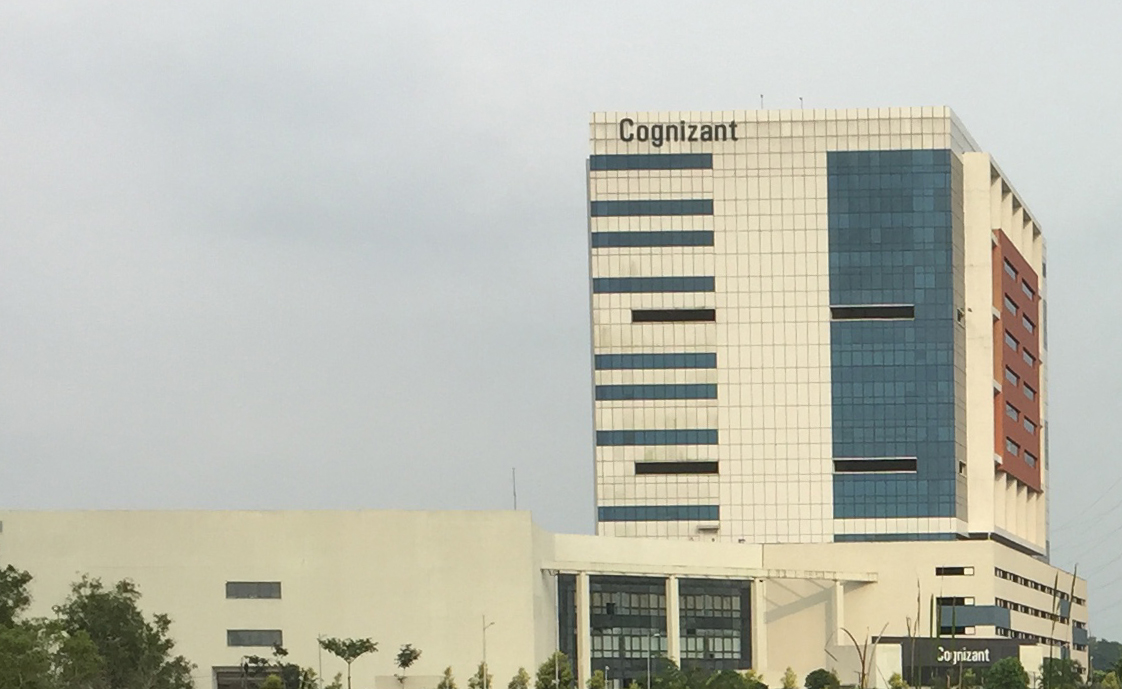
Cognizant Campus at Infopark Phase II

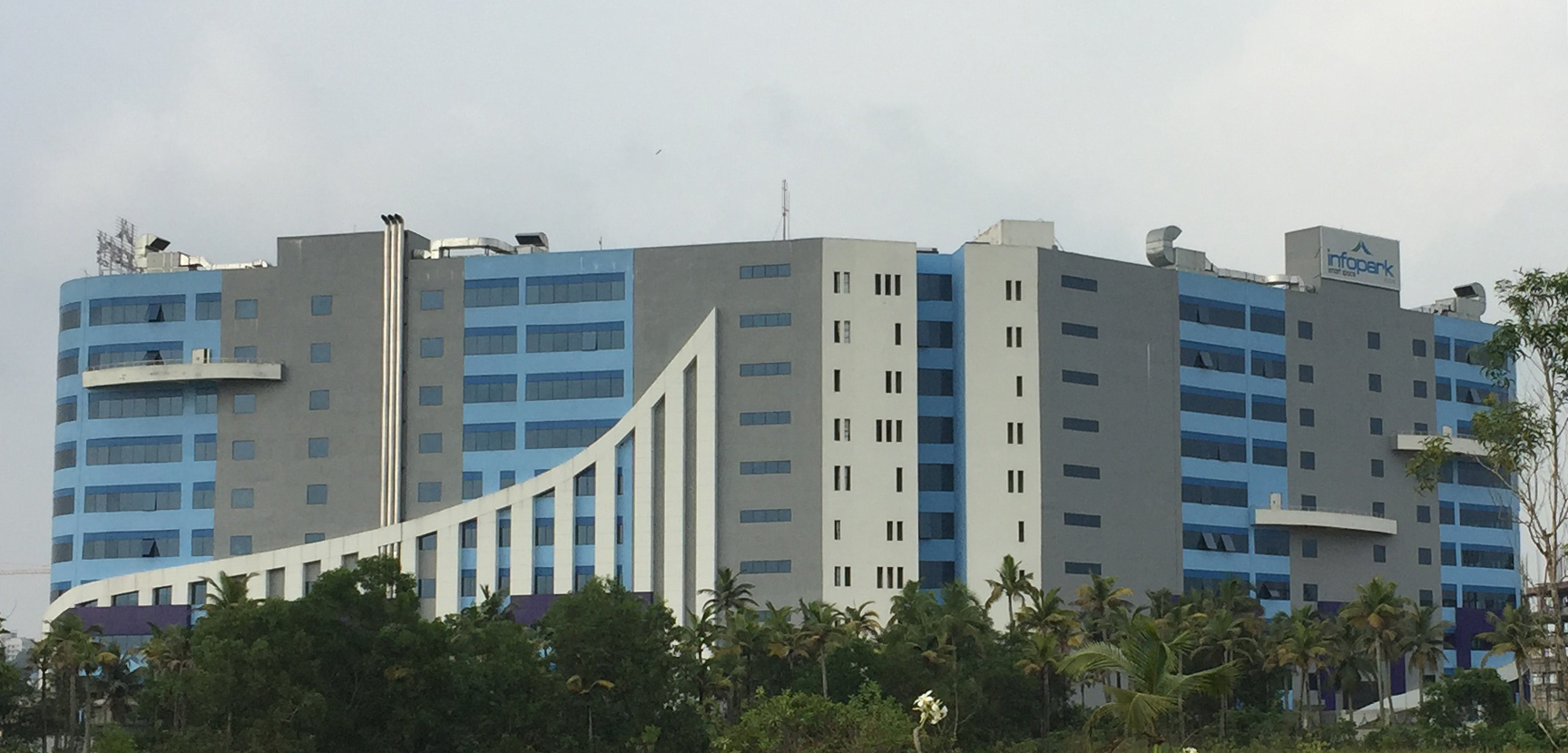
Jyothirmaya building at Infopark Phase II

Infopark Kochi is expanding its activities in Infopark Phase II. The Jyothirmaya building inaugurated by the Chief Minister of Kerala on 22 January 2017 is at a distance of around 1.6 km from Phase I campus and is on the side of Kadamprayar river. The new park is envisaged to be a landmark in the IT history of Keralam with both SEZ and non-SEZ type of development and social infrastructure. The new park lies in an extent of 160 acres in the neighboring Kunnathunad- Puthencruz villages of Kunnathunad Taluk, Ernakulam District. The Board of Approvals (BoA) of the Union Ministry of Commerce have granted SEZ status to the 98 acres in Infopark phase II.

A master plan for the second phase envisages infrastructure development for development blocks in SEZ and non-SEZ clusters, BPO complexes, utility services including substation, water treatment plant, sewage treatment plant, road network, etc. The park will be designed as an eco-friendly green park with high energy-saving measures and least carbon emission. Apart from the built-up space for IT, the park will have a large business convention center, budget hotels, shopping complexes, commercial centers, recreation, and entertainment centers.

Infopark along with its co-developers expect to create 8 million sq.ft. of IT/ITES/BPO and associated basic infrastructure and commercial and social infrastructure space. The basic infrastructure that will be developed by Infopark will include a 220 kV Gas Insulated Substation (GIS) with distribution facilities, access, and internal roads, stormwater drains, cable trenches, water treatment, and supply, data connectivity, etc. Master Plan of the Park has been developed by CannonDesign, New York-based Architectural Consultant.

Three multinational companies have already evinced interest in the Rs 2,500 crore, 8 Million sqft Phase II of Infopark Kochi. The second phase is expected to be completed in eight years. Infrastructure development will be undertaken in a phased manner and will be completed by 2011. The construction of the first IT building of around 5 lakhs sq.ft. has commenced and is expected to be completed by December 2012. On full completion, total employment expected to be generated in this new campus is 80,000.

== Branches ==
Infopark has branched out to nearby cities and towns. The park follows a Hub and Spoke model for the development of the Information Technology industry in Keralam. Infopark, Kochi acts as the hub, with spokes located at Thrissur and Cherthala.

=== Infopark Thrissur ===
Infopark Thrissur is located at Koratty which is around 45 km from Kochi in Thrissur District. It is approximately 20 km from Cochin International Airport at Nedumbassery. The park is situated very close to the National Highway 544. Currently, Infopark, Thrissur possesses 30 acres of prime land. It is expected that some more land also will be added to the Park in the near future. Infrastructure development work for the Park has already commenced. The first set of IT Buildings of approximately 40,000 sft area with plug and play facilities is ready and companies have started setting-up operations at Thrissur. Phase-II additional 3,30 lakhs sft of space will be ready for allotment by October 2015.

=== Infopark Cherthala ===
Located in Pallipuram village, Cherthala taluk of Alappuzha District. The total area of the park is 66 acres of which 60 acres has been notified as a sector-specific Special Economic Zone by the Ministry of Commerce, Government of India vide notification dated 8 June 2009. The First IT Building by Infopark having an area of 2.4 lakhs sq.ft is now ready for operations.

== Transportation ==
There are a small number of private buses which operate into the InfoPark campus from different corners of Kochi city such as Aluva, downtown Ernakulam and Thripunithura. Mostly private bus will not come on time and working people need to commute via Auto rickshaws or Taxis.

A boat service runs between Vyttila Mobility Hub and Kakkanad jetty, which is located close to the InfoPark Expressway. This ferry covers the distance between Vyttila and Kakkanad in 20 minutes. KMRL operates AC low-floor feeder bus services from Kakkanad Water metro station to InfoPark.

The Kochi Metro rail has planned its extension to Kakkanad from Kaloor Stadium. This extension will terminate at InfoPark with a metro station each at Phase-I and Phase-II campuses, thus giving efficient metro rail connectivity to the IT park.

The lack of transport connectivity to Infopark at Kakkanad is a major hurdle for the 30,000-strong workforce. At a workshop on 'Connecting the Dots on Public Transport', recently organized by the Centre for Public Policy Research (CPPR) and World Trade Center (WTC) Kochi, several proposals were made to develop public transport in the area. These include re-routing of buses or providing additional bus services, introducing modern transportation infrastructure such as demand-based bus systems, and improving existing water and road connectivity to the area.

== See also ==
- Cyberpark
- Economy of Kochi
- Infopark, Thrissur
- Smart City, Kochi
- Cyber City, Kochi
- Electronics City, Kochi
- Technopark, Trivandrum
- Infopark Cherthala
