= Seaport-Airport Road =

Economic highway in Kochi

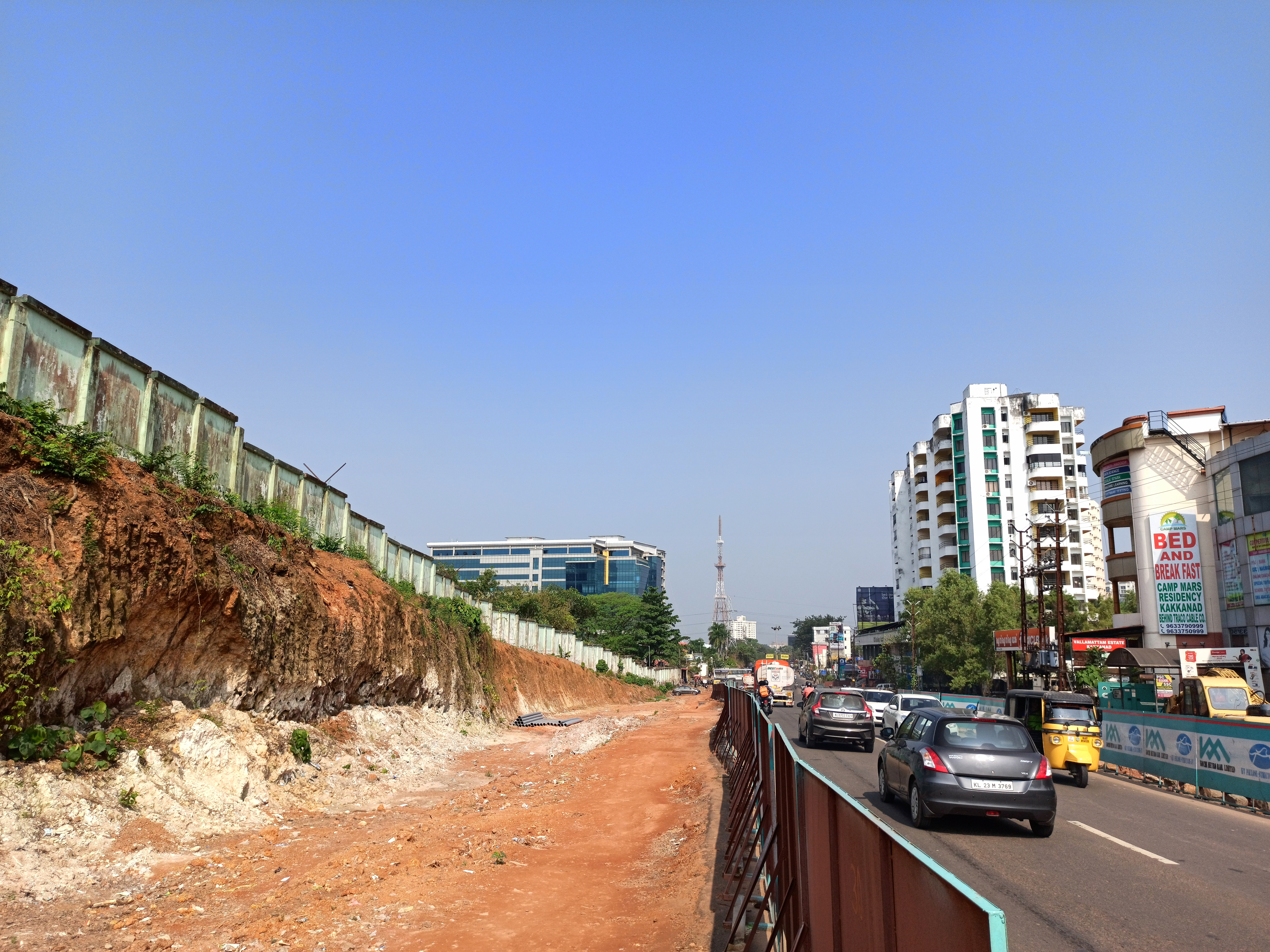

Route information
- Length: 30 km (19 mi)

Major junctions
- North end: Cochin International Airport
- Kalamassery HMT, Kakkanad, CRL Road Junction
- South end: Cochin seaport

Location
- Country: India
- States: Kerala: 30 km (19 mi)
- Primary destinations: Kalamassery - Kakkanad - Irumpanam - Tripunithura - Ernakulam

Highway system
- Roads in India; Expressways; National; State; Asian

Seaport-Airport Road (SPAP Road) is supposed to be a four-lane, 30 km (19 mi) highway from Cochin seaport to the Cochin International Airport developed to improve the transport infrastructure in the city of Kochi, India. This highway passes through the Cochin Special Economic Zone and connects such major industrial units as HMT, FACT, and Kochi Refineries as also the various oil terminals at Irumpanam and also boosts the flow of cargo traffic both from the port and the airport. The District Headquarters is located on this road. The IT Expressway to Infopark is starting from this road. The 13-km road constructed in the first phase acting as a by-pass to the NH 544 within the Kochi city limits. Petroleum tankers from Irumpanam oil terminals can now move north up to Kalamassery without entering the core city areas. To ensure a smooth and durable road, natural rubber modified bitumen (NRMB) is used.

== Phases ==
=== Phase I ===
The first phase is 13 km (8.1 mi) between Kalamassery HMT (10.051°N 76.335°E) and Karingachira Church (9.951°N 76.3585°E) near Tripunithura including construction of ROB (Railway Over Bridge) at Irumpanam yard (9.972°N 76.356°E) and ROB at CRL Junction. It was inaugurated in May 2003.

=== Phase II ===
Development of 17 km (11 mi) between HMT and Cochin International Airport and up to Kariyad (near Angamaly, 10.163°N 76.370°E) in NH 544. Land acquisition for this phase is in progress, construction is progressing in HMT - NAD stretch. Estimate to complete the work is Rs. 662-crore.

=== Phase III ===
Development of the entire stretch of road between NH 66 (Kochi Bypass)Bypass (kundanoor junction) and Cochin International Airport up to Kariyadu as a four-lane highway. The project has been proposed as a four-lane highway with a design speed of 100 km/h. After completion of all stretches, this road is expected to ease the pressure on NH 544 especially where it takes more than an hour for a heavy vehicle from the airport to reach the Kochi port.
