= Technopark =

Technopark or Technoparc may refer to:

- Science park or technopark, an area with a collection of buildings dedicated to scientific research on a business footing
- Technopark Zürich, Zürich, Canton of Zürich, Switzerland
- South Bank Technopark, London South Bank University, England
- Technopark Morocco
- Technopark, Trivandrum, at Thiruvananthapuram, Kerala, India
- Technopark, Kollam, at Kollam, Kerala, India
- Technopark Stellenbosch, Stellenbosch, South Africa
- Tekhnopark (Moscow Metro), a station of the Zamoskvoretskaya Line of the Moscow Metro
- Technoparc Montreal, an industrial park in the Montreal west island
- Parc d'entreprises de la Pointe-Saint-Charles, an industrial park in Montreal, formerly known as Montreal Technoparc
- Elgazala Technopark, the first technopark in Tunisia
- Technopark Station, a subway station on Line 1 of the Incheon Subway
- Technoparc station, a planned Réseau électrique métropolitain station
