= Divine Nagar railway station =

Railway station in Kerala, India

Divine Nagar
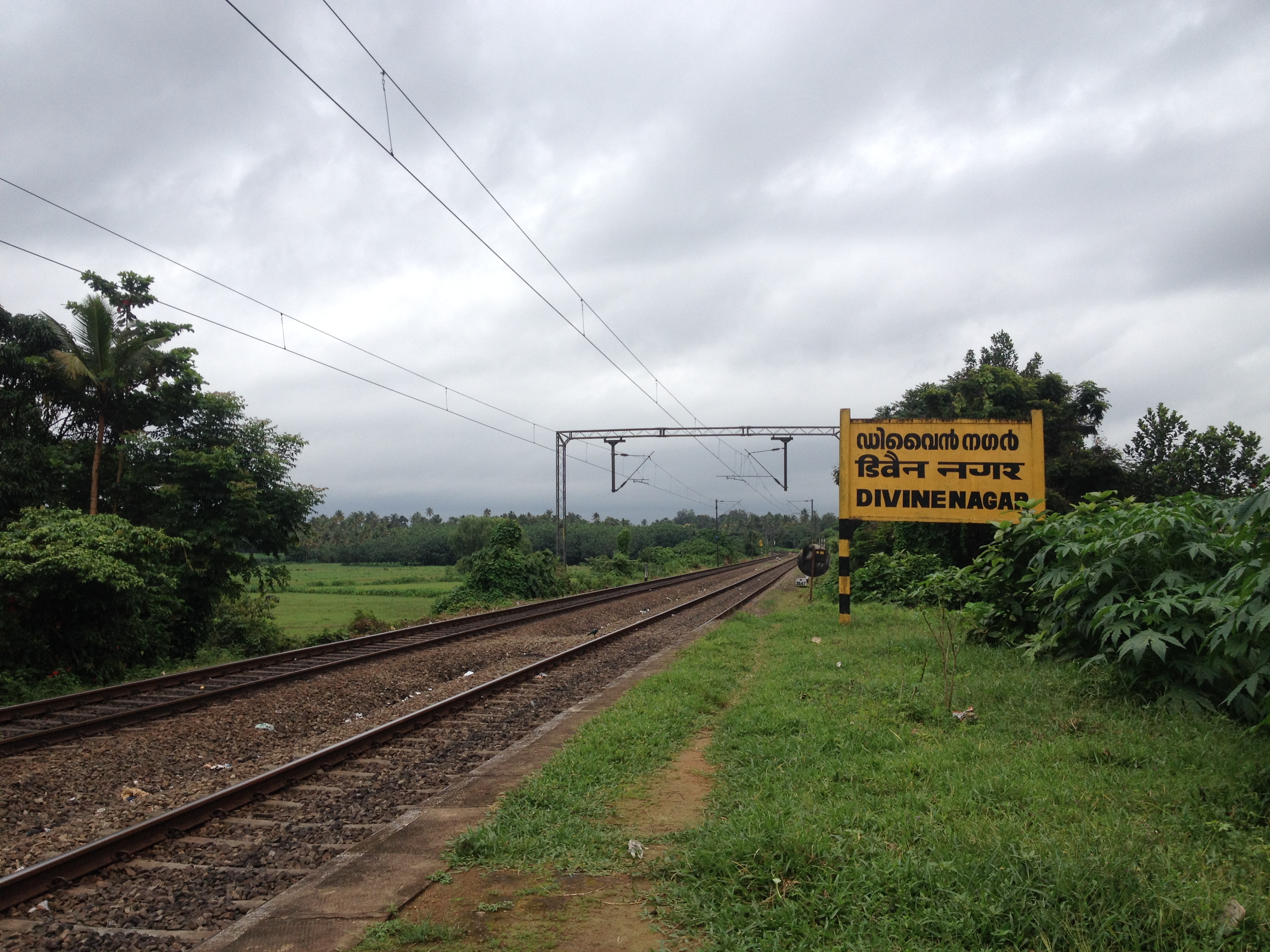

General information
- Coordinates: 10.2858°N 76.3368°E
- System: Indian Railways station
- Owner: Indian Railways
- Line: Shoranur–Cochin Harbour section
- Platforms: 2
- Tracks: 2

Construction
- Structure type: At-grade
- Parking: Yes
- Cycle facilities: Yes

Other information
- Station code: DINR
- Fare zone: Southern Railway

Services
Preceding station	Indian Railways	Following station
Chalakudi towards Shoranur Junction	Southern Railway zone Shoranur–Cochin Harbour section	Koratty towards Cochin Harbour Terminus
Location
- Location within India Location within Kerala

Divine Nagar railway station (Station Code: DINR) falls between Chalakudi and Koratty railway station in the busy Shoranur–Cochin Harbour section in Thrissur district, Kerala, India. This railway station is cared for by a divine retreat center.

== Administration ==
Divine Nagar railway station is operated by the Chennai-headquartered Southern Railway zone of the Indian Railways. This station is a HG-1 class station under the Thiruvananthapuram railway division.

== Services ==
Two pairs of passenger trains and two pairs of MEMU trains halt at this station daily. One pair of express train halt here on Fridays, Saturdays, and Sundays for the convenience of people travelling to the Divine Retreat Centre which is situated adjacent to the station. Express train is the Netravati Express.
