= Infopark, Cherthala =

Coordinates: 9.73247°N 76.35372°E

Infopark Cherthala
- Type: Government Owned
- Industry: Information Technology Business Park
- Genre: Infrastructure Service Provider
- Founded: 9 January 2011
- Headquarters: Cherthala, India
- Area served: 66 acres
- Key people: Chief Minister of Kerala, Chairman Shri. Rathan U Kelkar IAS, Secretary (Electronics & IT Dept) Mr Susanth Kurunthil, CEO
- Owner: Government of Kerala
- Parent: InfoPark, Kochi

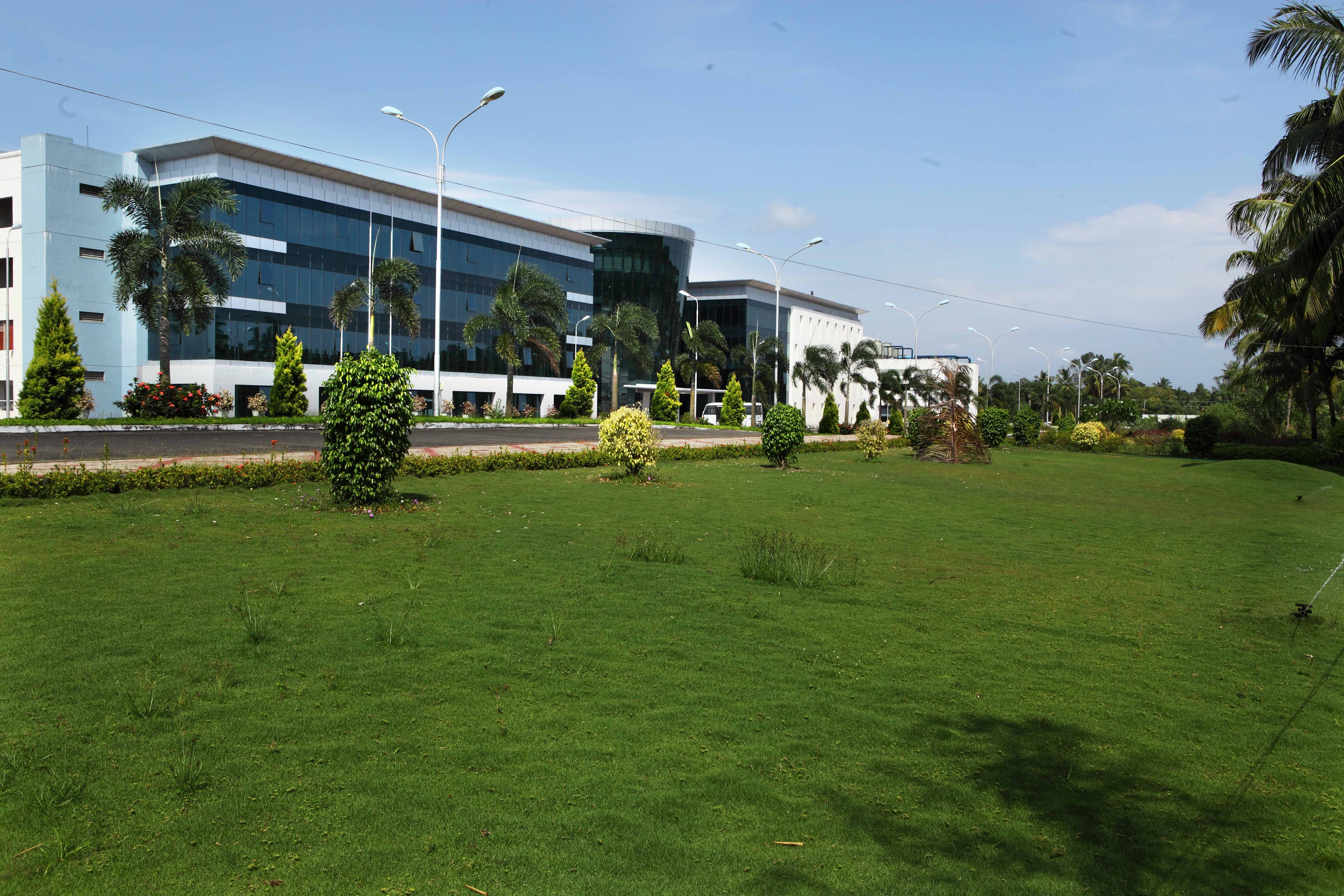
Cherthala Infopark

Infopark Cherthala (Malayalam: ഇൻഫോപാർക്ക് ചേര്‍ത്തല) is an information technology park located in Pallipuram village, Cherthala taluk of Alappuzha district, Kerala, India. The project was inaugurated by Ex. Chief minister V. S. Achuthanandan.

== Description ==
The park is built on the hub and spoke model for the development of the information technology industry in Kerala. The total area of the park is 66 acres of land and of which 60 acres has been notified as a sector-specific Special Economic Zone by the Ministry of Commerce, Government of India. InfoPark, Kochi acts as the hub to the spokes located at InfoPark Thrissur and Cherthala. Infopark is 6.8 kilometres (4.2 mi) from downtown Cherthala bus station and 8.9 kilometres (5.5 mi) from the Cherthala railway station. A few companies are registered as training institutes. Currently, more than 20 companies working there.

== Companies ==
- Techgentsia Software Technologies Pvt. Ltd
- Voyager IT Solutions Pvt Ltd
- Pixotri Technologies
- Datum Innovation
- Ridgecone Technologies Pvt. Ltd
- Smarc Technologies
- Virtualsys Technologies
- Claysys
- Silver Link
- Qwave
- Calsys communication Pvt. Ltd
- Cipherpeak Pvt. Ltd

== See also ==
- InfoPark, Kochi
- Infopark Thrissur
- Technopark
- Technopark Kollam
- SmartCity, Kochi
- Technocity, Thiruvananthapuram
