= St. Mary's Syro-Malabar Catholic Church, Koratty =

Coordinates: 10°15′55″N 76°20′47″E

Korattymuthy Church
- Shrine of Our Lady of Koratty
- Lourdes of Kerala
- Koratty Muthy കൊരട്ടി മുത്തിയമ്മ
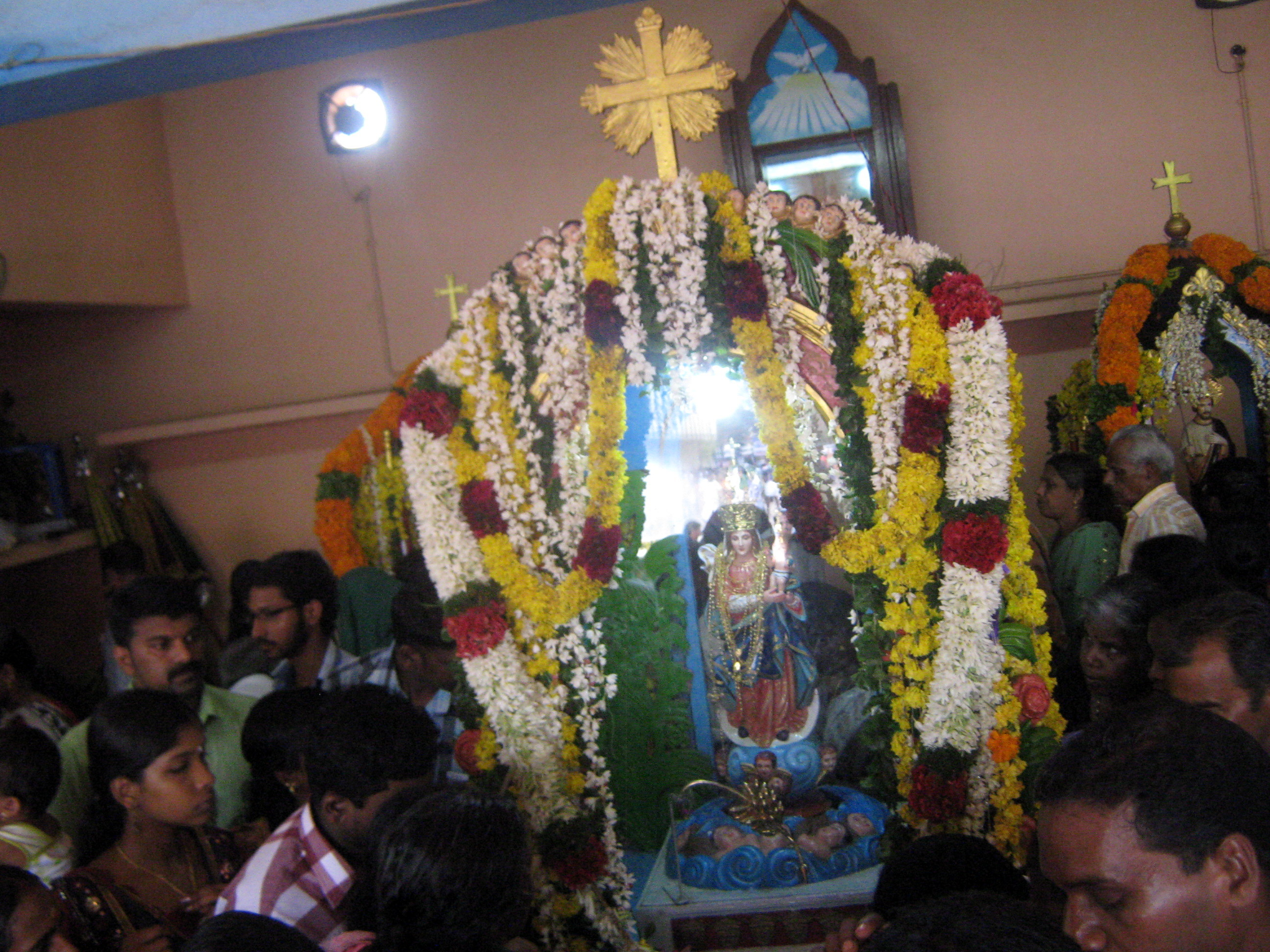
- Korattymuthy
- Korattymuthy Church
- Location: Koratty, Thrissur, Kerala
- Country: India
- Denomination: Catholic

History
- Founded: 1 October 1381; 644 years ago - but see note below
- Dedication: Saint Mary
- Dedicated: 1381
- Consecrated: 1381

Administration
- District: Thrissur
- Archdiocese: Eranakulam - Angamaly
- Diocese: Eranakulam - Angamaly
- Parish: St. Mary's Forane Church, Koratty

Clergy
- Archbishop: Mar George Cardinal Alencherry
- Bishop: Antony Kariyil
- Vicar: Fr. Johnson kakkatt

Korattymuthy at Koratty Church is the locally known name of Hail Mary or Mother Mary of Syro-Malabar Catholic community at Koratty in Kerala State, India. Korattymuthy's Shrine is famous for its annual feast with 'Poovankula' (a special plantain), Muttilizhayal (walking on knee) offerings.

Korattymuthy is also known as 'Our Lady with Poovan Banana' (Poovankula Matha). The shrine is also known as The Lourdes of Kerala. It is believed that the shrine was established in 1381. However, its proven existence dates back only to the reign of Sakthan Thampuran (1775–1790).

== Background information ==
St. Mary’s Syro-Malabar Catholic Forane Church, Koratty, in the Archdiocese of Ernakulam-Angamaly, is considered the most important Marian Pilgrim Centre in India after Velankanni. It is also the largest Marian pilgrimage travel and Catholic tour travel destination of Kerala. Millions of devotees throng to this Marian apparition of India every year.

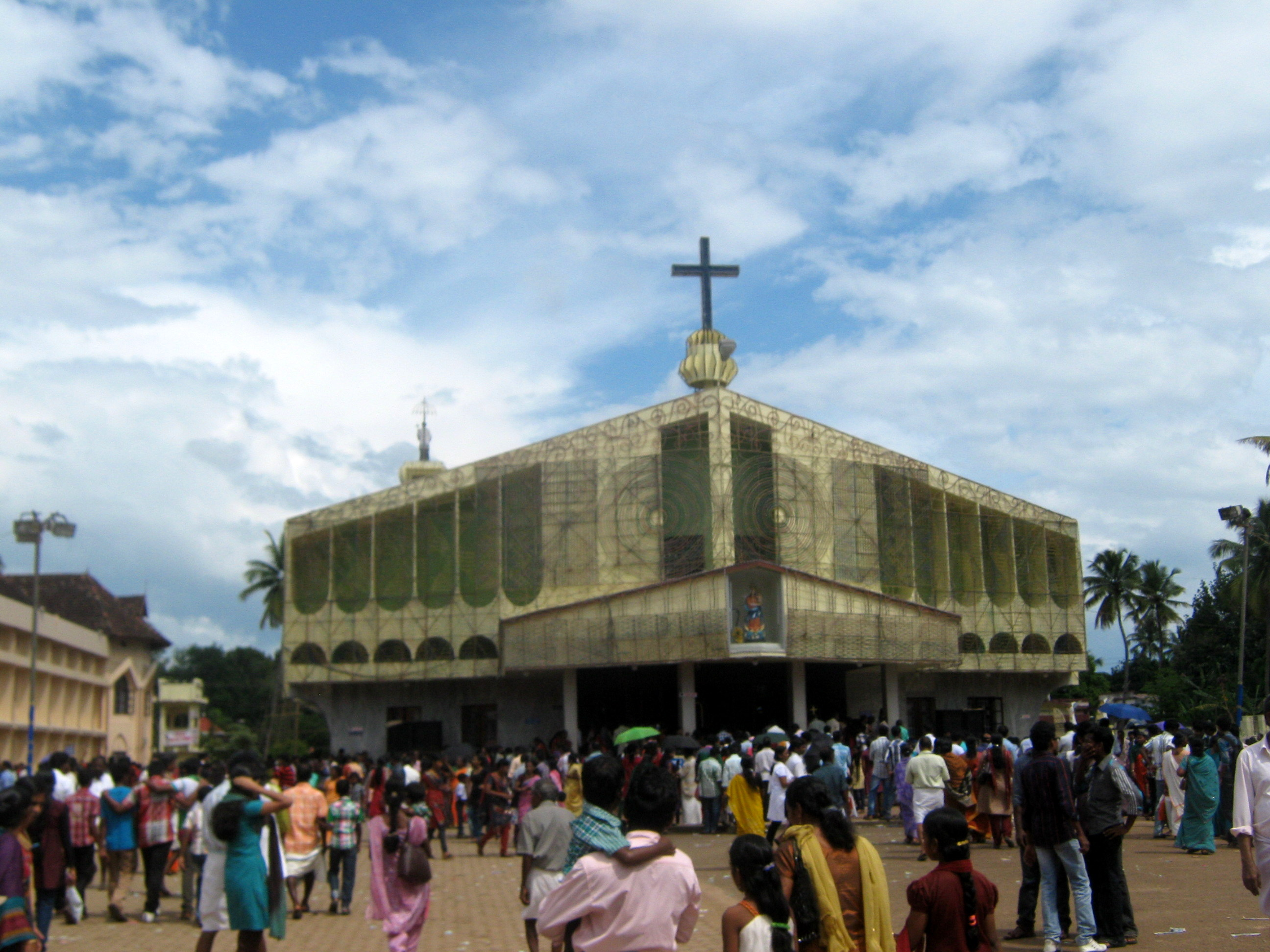

== History ==
Kodungallur, Angamaly and Ambazhakad were the ancient Christian centers of Kerala and their history is associated with Hindu feudal lords and the Thampuratty (Queen) of the Kingdom of Koratty (Koratty Swaroopam). There were many landlords, also known as 'swaroopams', in the Kochi region; they had their own armies and could rule independently. They could judge people and even pronounce the death sentence, as long as they were loyal to the king. Koratty Kaimal and Kodassery Kartha were the two major feudal lords of the Kochi royal family, and they fought each other.

Ambazhakad Church was established in AD 300 and was the parish of the Christians of Koratty. The church was under the administrative rule of Kodassery Kartha. Christians had acquired military training and went to the church with a sword and shield. The position, eminence, humbleness and truthfulness of Christians in business, agriculture and military service were the reasons they were regarded trustworthy by Hindu rulers.

Koratty was the administrative region of Koratty Kaimal. In military service, the Nairs were under Kartha and Christians were under Kaimal. There were constant battles between the two armies. Kodassery Kartha far surpassed in military power Koratty Kaimal. The Christian Sri Kavalakkadan Kochu Vareeth was the chief commander of Kaimal's army. His leadership and military strategies led the Kaimal's party close to victory, but then he was killed in action by Kartha's army. But the Thampuratty (the queen), the ruler of the Koratty Swaroopam, bravely led Kaimal's army and won the battle, as she was so shook by the death of Kochu Vareeth. Thampuratty gave orders to conduct the funeral according to the Christian rituals and in full military honours. The chief commander's dead body was taken to Ambazhakad church for the funeral. As Ambazhakad parish was under the administrative area of Kodassery, due to his interference, the vicar did not give his permission to bury the body there. They were asked to take the coffin from that place. In the return procession, carrying the coffin to Koratty region, the weary pallbearers placed the coffin down. After rest, they could not lift the coffin from there. When they informed Thampuratty about the situation, an order was given to bury the body there. In reverence to the chief commander, a cross in granite, of around 20 feet high and 12 inches width, was posted there. This is the granite cross that stands in front of the church today. Kochu Vareeth's has descendants still recognized by their family name 'Kavalakatt'.

The Thampuratty constructed a church near the burial place of her chief commander, for the spiritual needs of the Christians living in that region. Land free from taxes was given to support the church activities and rituals. Construction work began on 15 August 1381 and was completed with the consecration on 8 September 1382. The altars and the artworks above it dated back to the 15th century.

This church came to be known as the Marian Pilgrim Centre of Koratty Muthy.

Now Korattymuthy is one of the major pilgrim centre of Kerala.

== Story behind the name – Our Lady with Poovan Bananas ==
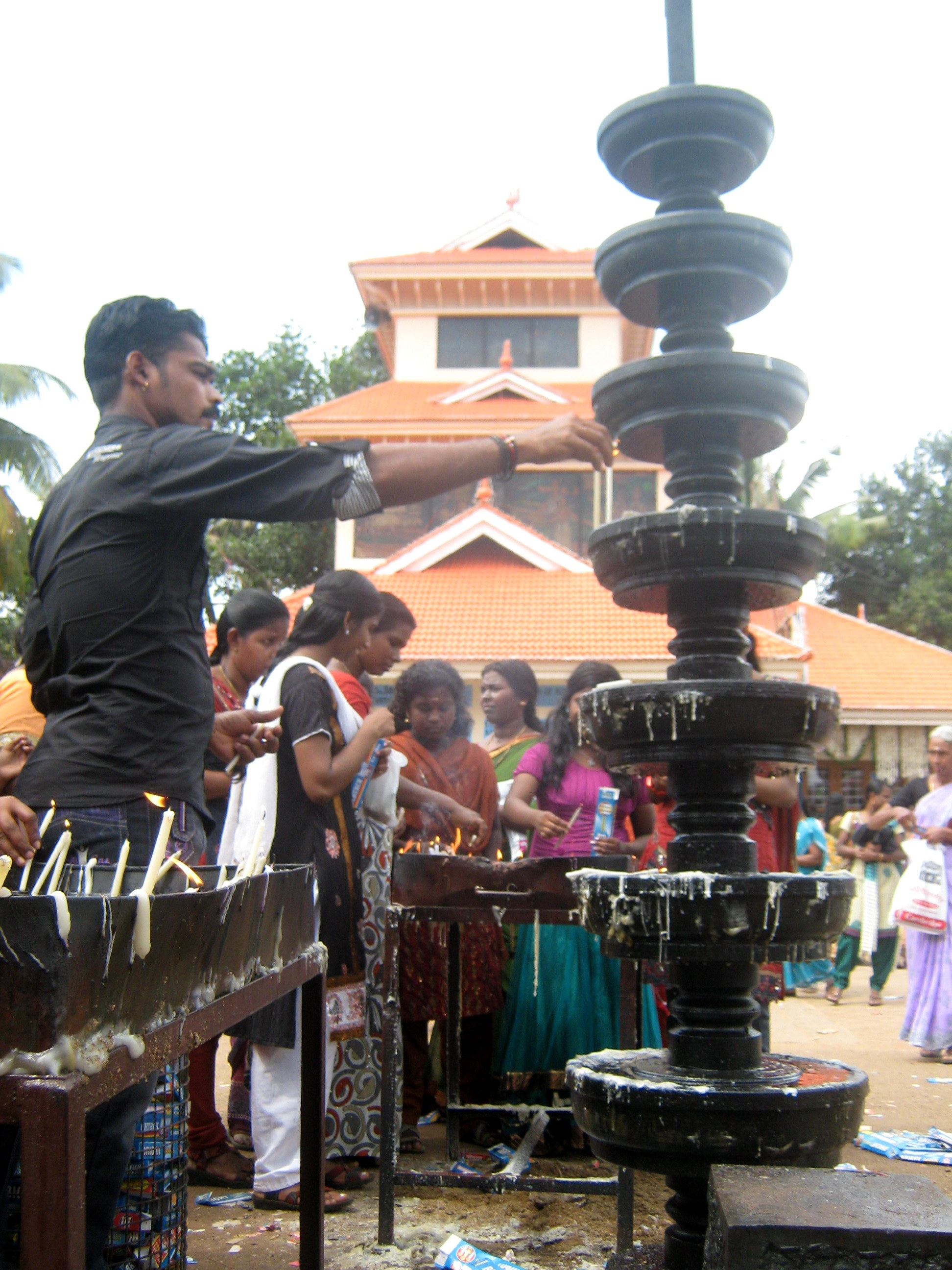
Korattymuthy – Shrine of Our Lady with Poovan Bananas (Poovankula Matha)

The main story was that a pilgrim from Meloor near Koratty was carrying a bunch of a special variety of plantain fruit, namely 'Poovan Bananas', as an offering to the Koratty Muthy. On the way, he had to pass through a paddy field where a hungry man was sitting. On seeing the basket of bananas, he asked the pilgrim to hand him two bananas. The pilgrim refused, explaining that it was an offering to be placed before the Koratty Mutthy. But he forcibly took out two bananas from the basket and ate them. As soon as he had eaten the bananas, the man started writhing with intense pain in his stomach. Medicines could not cure the pain and the landlord realized that it had been some divine intervention; he immediately gave away a golden statue of banana as an offering to the Koratty Muthy. The moment he did this, the pain subsided. Since that day, pilgrims come from all over Kerala with bananas as an offering to the Koratty Muthy. Now 'Poovankula Matha' is also the Virgin Mary shrine as Korattymuthy.

== Other Marian events in Koratty ==
The Koratty railway station is also part of a popular tale. During one of the annual feasts and festivals of the Koratty Muthy, a train which never had a stop in Koratty came to a mysterious halt when it reached Koratty. They found out it wasn't the cause of a mechanical fault, and they couldn't start the train again. The passengers joined in the celebrations at the Koratty Muthy Church and gave offerings to the Muthy. Later, when they came back, the mechanical fault was mysteriously rectified and the train could proceed. Sensing divine intervention, the authorities immediately made arrangements for a railway station at Koratty; that is how the present day Koratty Angadi Railway Station came to be.

The Madura Coats Factory has a similar awe-inspiring tale. The area where the factory is situated at present was originally planned to be an airport. Work was in full swing for the airport but kept being hindered in one way or other by a mysterious lady with a child in hand. The hindrances grew to such an extent that the plan for an airport was abandoned and instead the Madura Coats Factory was built, which employs over 1000 employees today.

St. Mary's Forane Church at Koratty, in the Archeparchy of Ernakulam-Angamaly, is the most revered Marian pilgrim centre in India after Velankanni (Vailankanni). Millions of devotees from far and wide come to this shrine, which is one of the biggest apparition sites in India.

== Location ==
- Situated close to the National Highway, 47,9 km from Angamaly and 5 km from Chalakudy in Trichur ( otherwise known as Thrissur or Trissur) Kerala State, South India
- 15 km from the Cochin (or Kochi) International Airport at Nedumbassery. Adjacent to the Koratty Angady Railway Station. Nearest big Railway Stations are Chalakudy and Trichur. Three km South of Divine Retreat Centre, Muringoor, Chalakudy, along National Highway 47 (NH 47 between Trichur and Cochin in southern part of India)

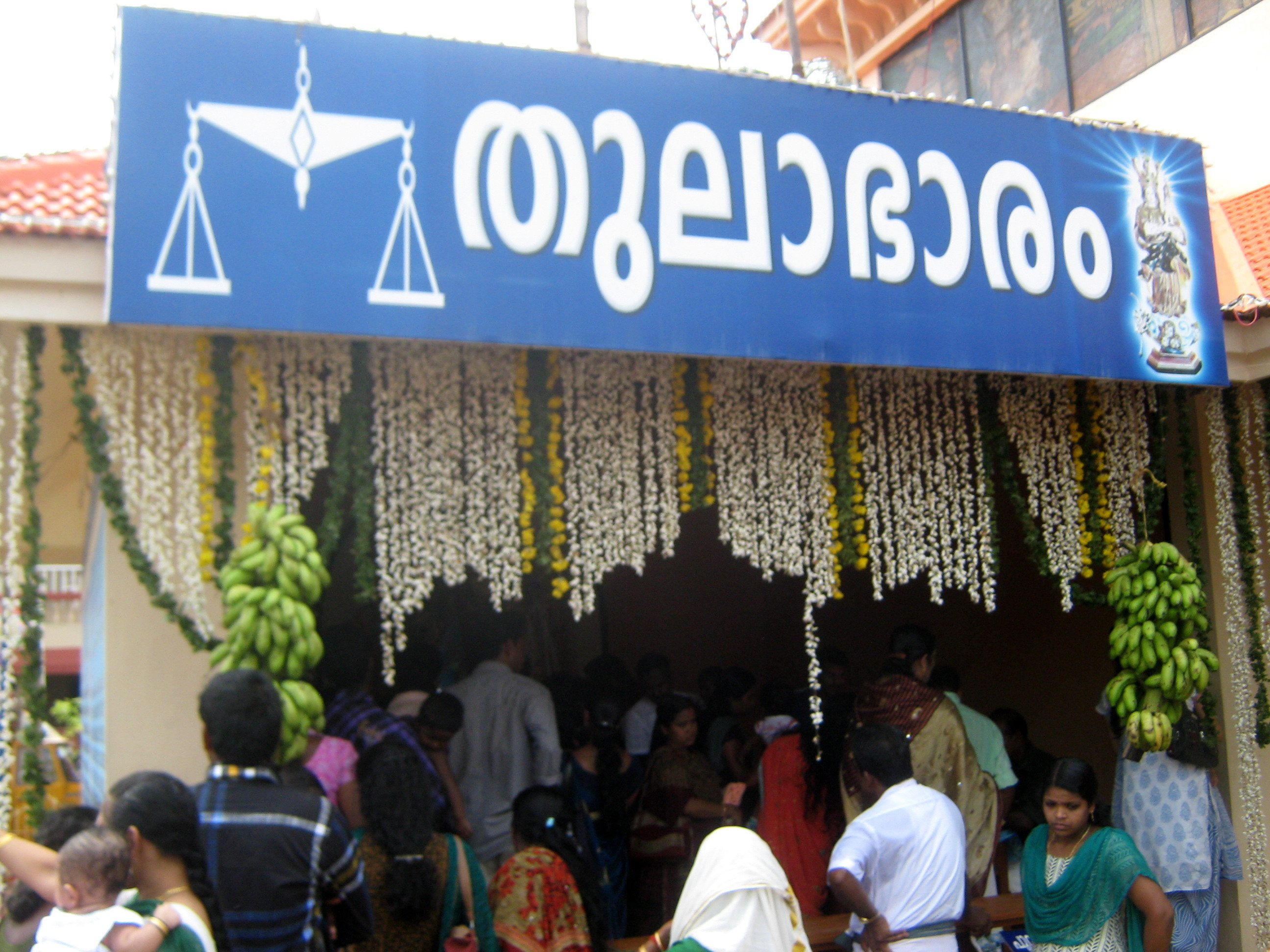
Thulabhaaram Nercha (offering counter)

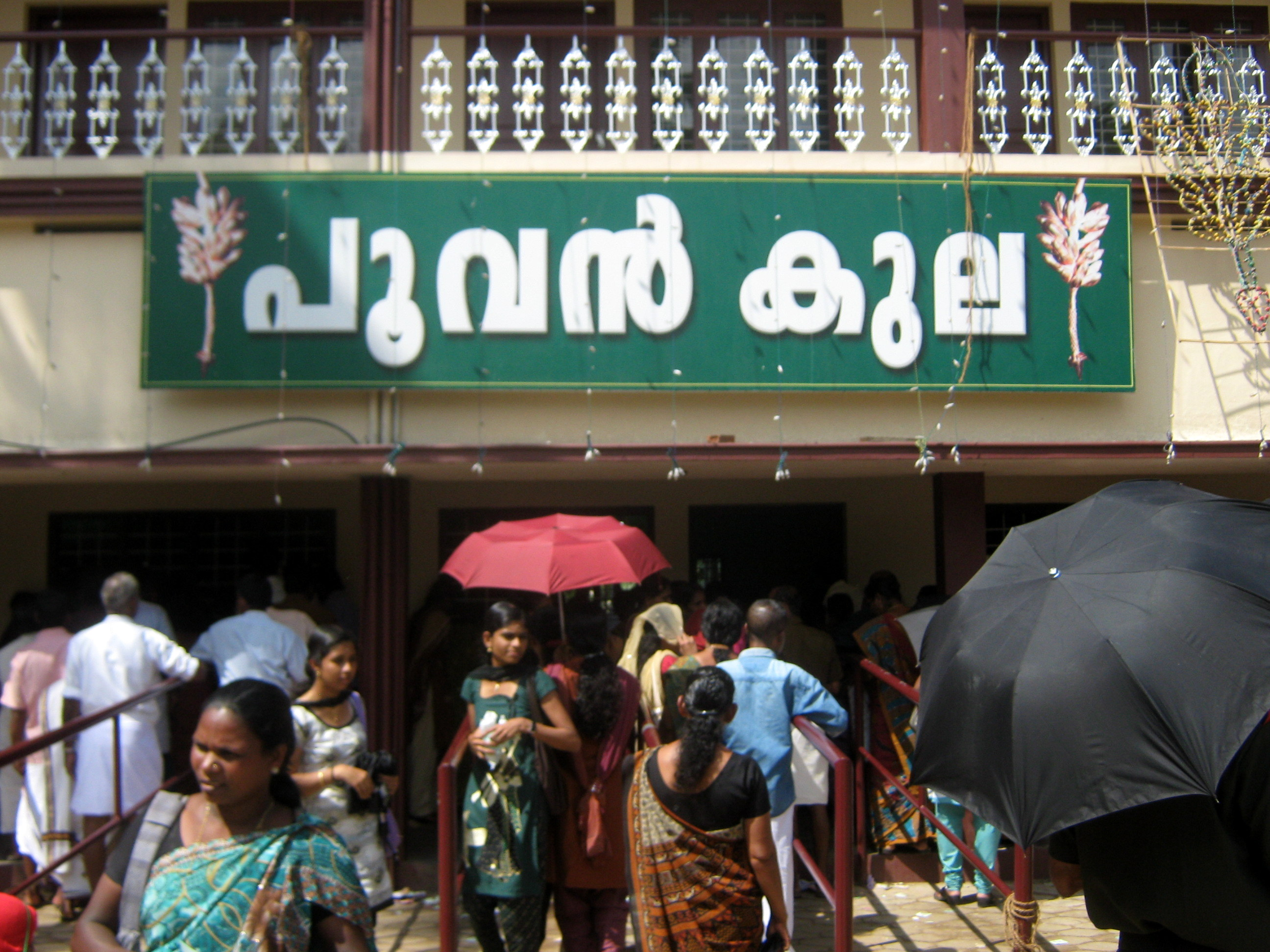
Poovankula Nercha (offering counter)

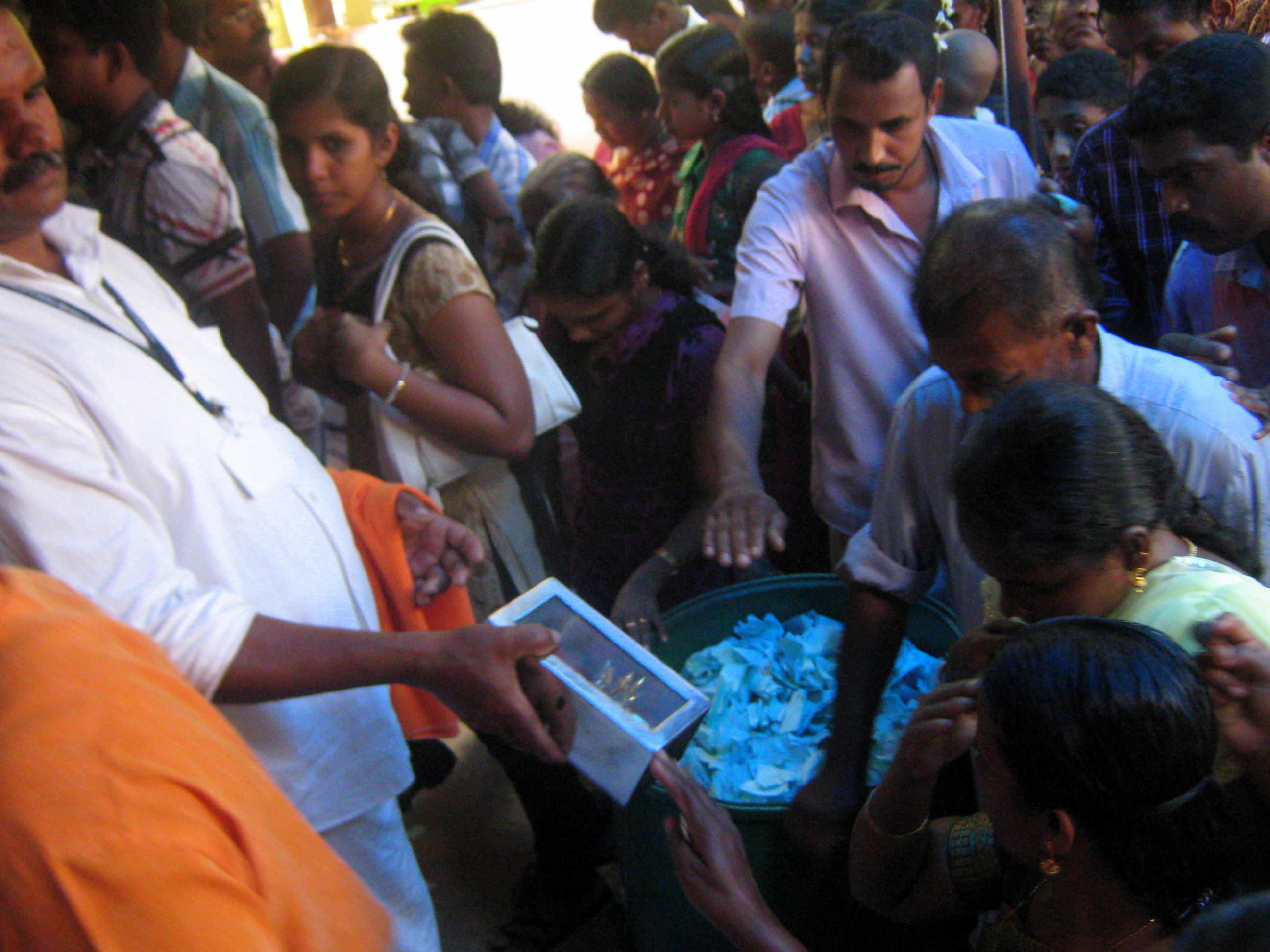
Poovankula Muththa (Adortion of Poovankula)

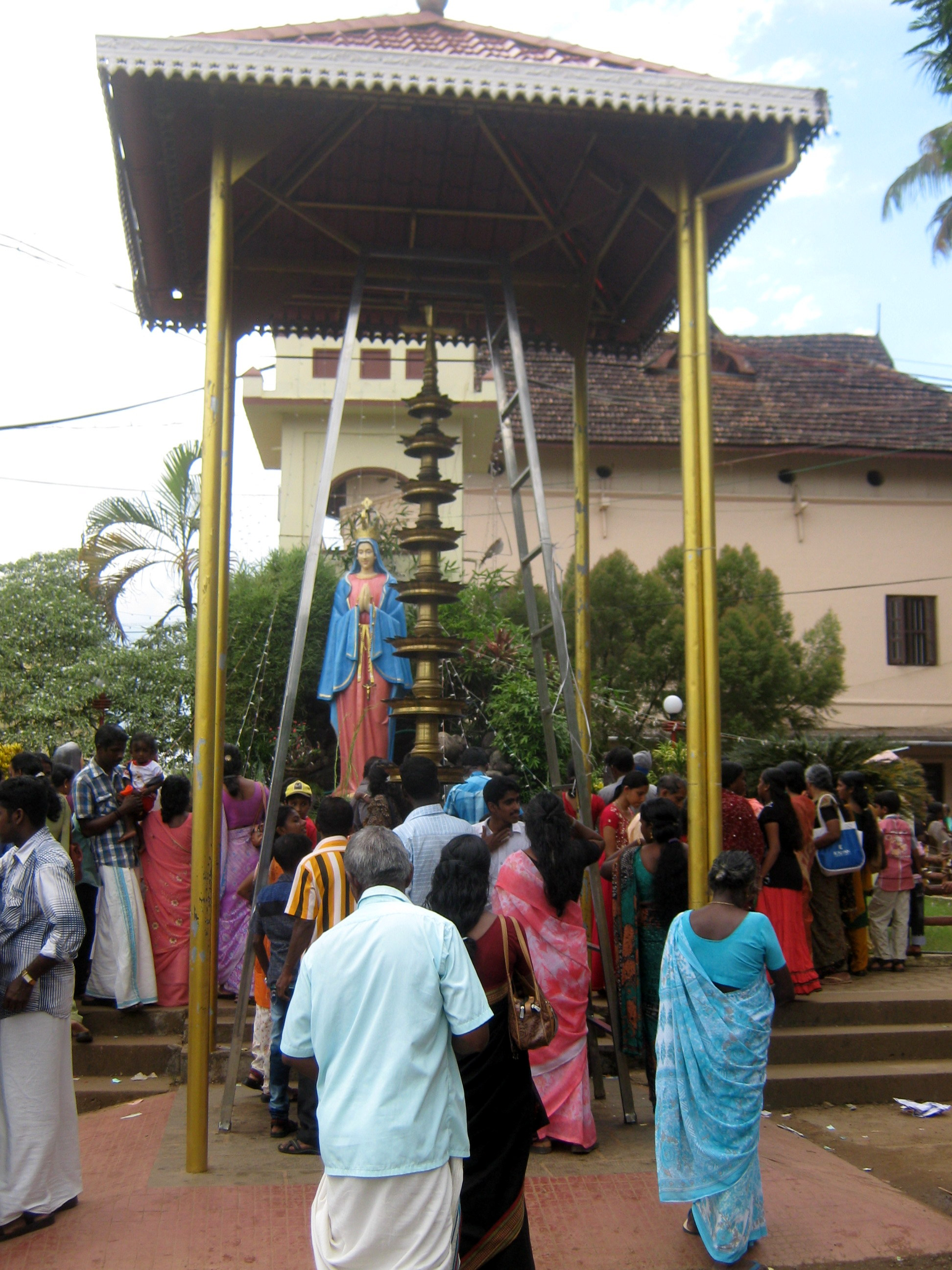
Nilavilakku

== Devotion to Our Lady ==
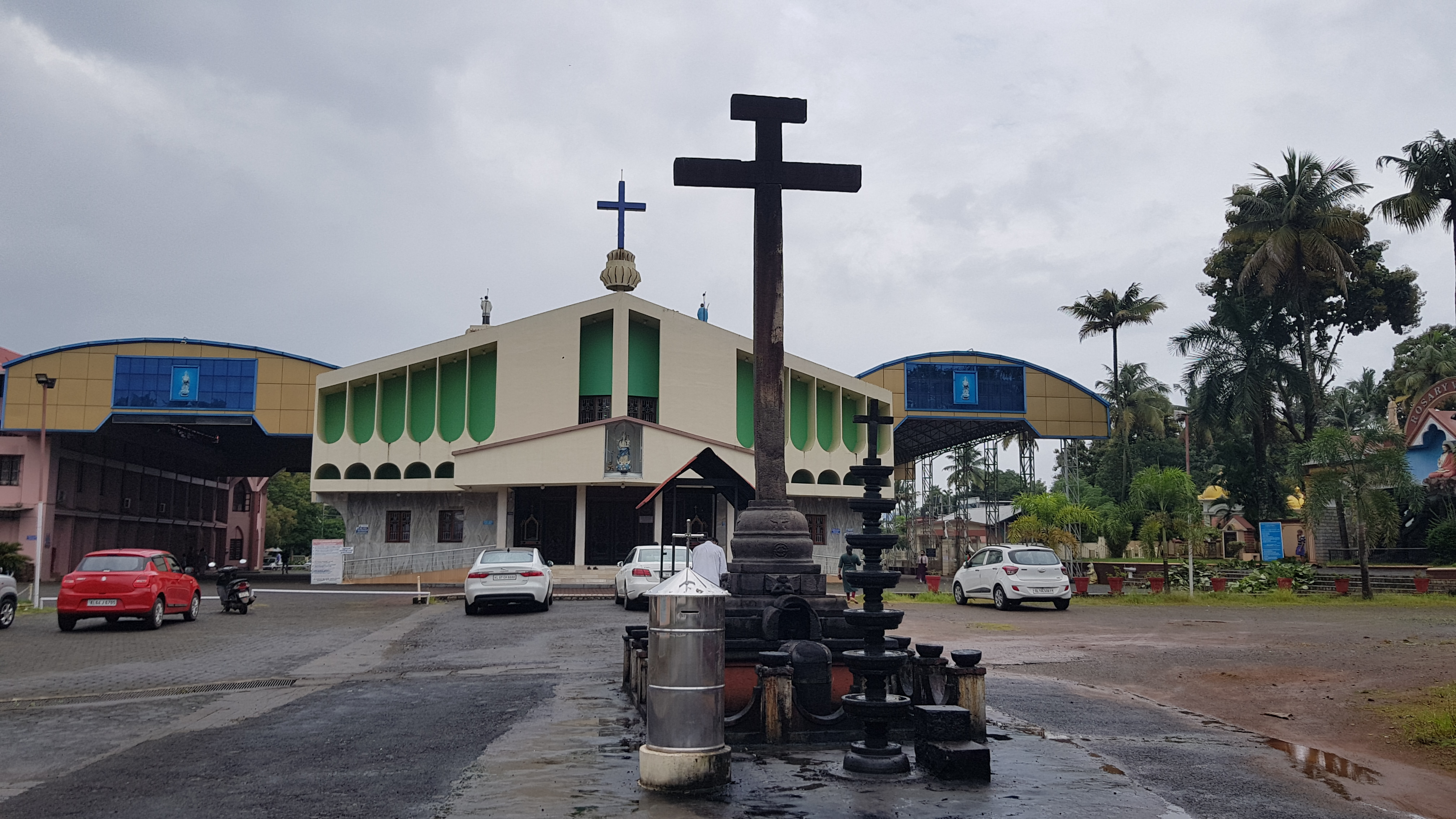

=== Devotees include ===
- The ill and the infirm
- Distressed damsels yearning for their partners in life
- Parents longing for children

=== Offerings ===
- Offering "Poovankula", the famous offering of Korattymuthy Shrine with "Poovan" Variety of banana, which grows in southern India. The offering (or 'Nercha') is made in single or in bunch. For this reason, Korattymuthy is known as "Our Lady With The Poovan Bananas" or "Poovankula Matha" in Malayalam. This offering is very much related to the myths associated with Korattymuthy Shrine. Many blessings and favours are evident from the thanks offerings given by the devotees.
- "Thulabharam" – an offering symbolizing total surrender of the self before Our Lady whereby devotees weigh their body weight in "Poovan Kula", a special variety of Plantain.
- "Neendal Nercha" – also known as "Muttilizhayal" – a ritual symbolizing penance for the sins committed, whereby a devotee crawls from the Main Entrance of the Church to the feet of Koratty Muthy.
- Offering "Bhajana" – a ritual in devotion to Our Lady, whereby the devotee sits at the feet of Our Lady in prayer and fasting to get imbibed with the spirit of Our Lady.

== Annual feast and festival ==
- Every year, Our Lady's Feast is celebrated in the month of October – Saturday and Sunday following 10 October followed for 14 days – with great pomp and fanfare. Bishops, priests, religious sisters and people from every caste and creed from around the country attend the feast and seek Our Lady's Blessings. The offerings include cash, candles and other valuables. The Mass is followed by pageantry. The newly built church is magnificently illuminated.
- Octave – the following Sunday

== Marian prayer to Korattymuthy – Our Lady with the Poovan Bananas ==
- Virgin full of goodness, Mother of Mercy, KORATTYMUTHY, I entrust to you my body and soul, my thoughts, my actions, my life and my death.
- O my mother Korattymuthy, deliver me from all the snares of the devil. Obtain for me the grace of loving my Lord Jesus Christ, your Son, with a true and perfect love, and after him. O Mary, Korattymuthy, to love you with all my heart and above all things.
- O my Korattymuthy, Mother of God, help me in obtaining all the favors I now need and seek especially ......... ... (mention your personal prayers)

Amen.
