= Technopark Morocco =

Business complex in Casablanca, Morocco

Coordinates: 33.543°N 7.641°W

Technopark
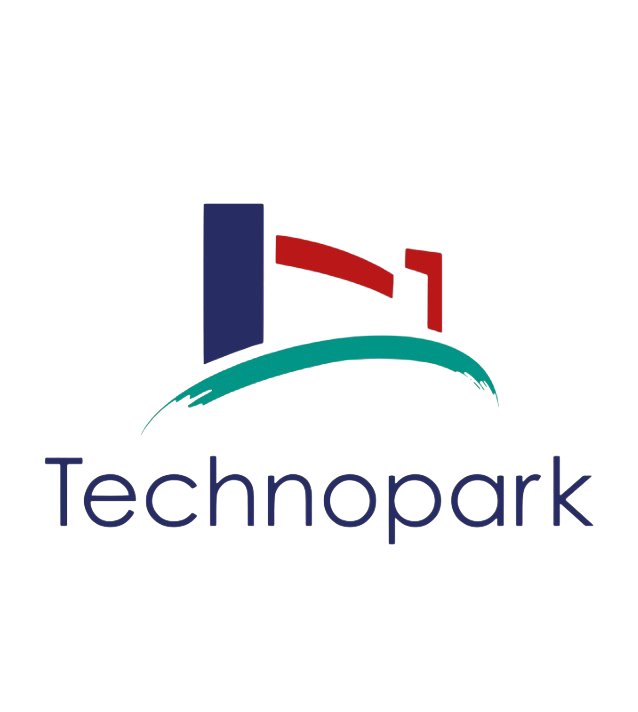

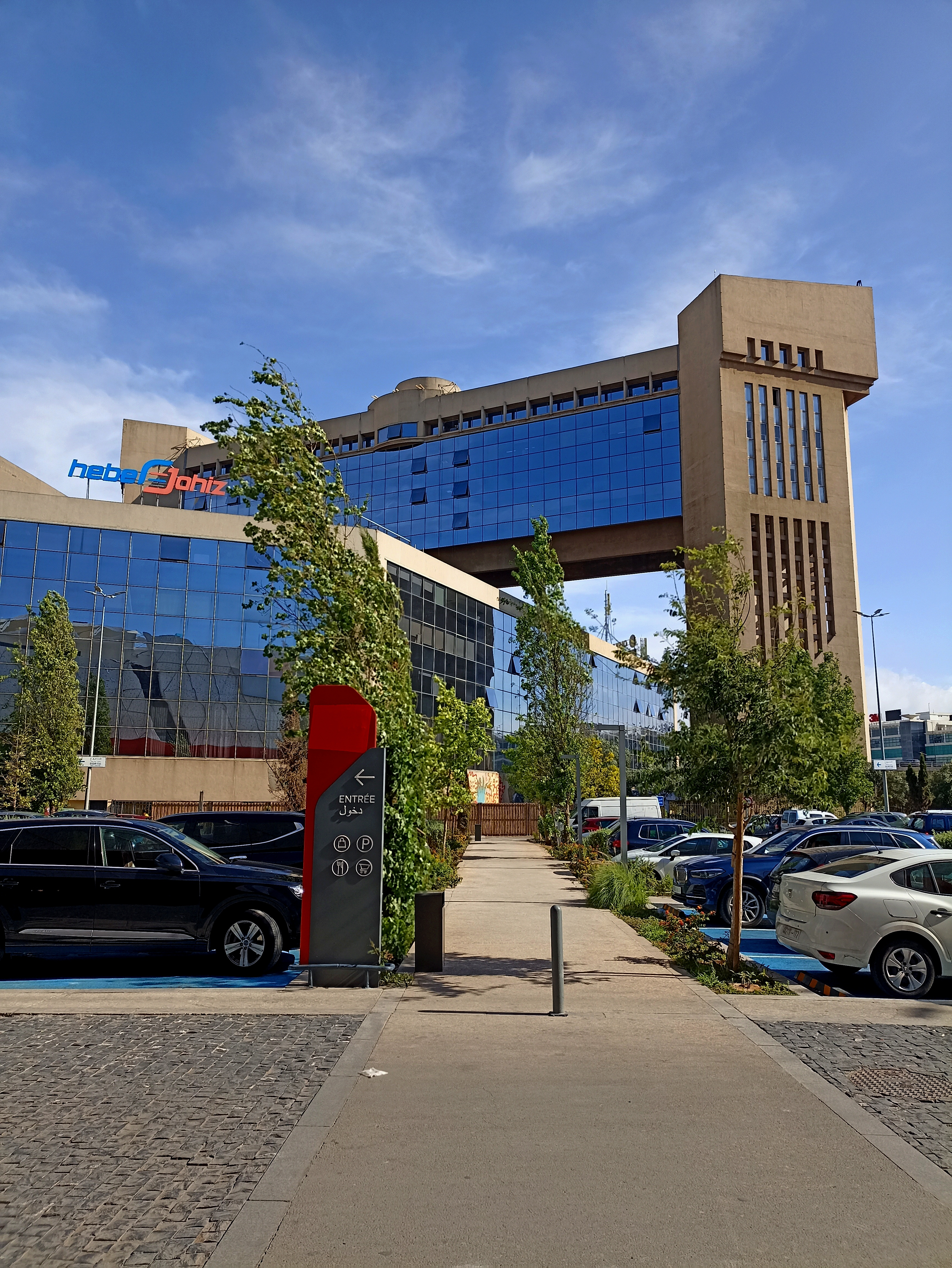
- Technopark in Casablanca
- Formation: 2001; 25 years ago
- Type: Public–private partnership
- Purpose: Business incubation and startup support
- Headquarters: Casablanca, Morocco
- Location: Morocco
- Services: Incubation, business support, infrastructure
- Fields: Information technology, innovation, renewable energy
- Website: www.technopark.ma

Technopark is a technology business incubator in Morocco, established in 2001 in Casablanca. It is designed to support the development of startups and small and medium-sized enterprises, primarily in the fields of information technology and, more recently, renewable energy.

The Technopark has been progressively expanded to other cities, with sites in Rabat (2012), Tanger (2015), Agadir (2021), and Essaouira (2023). Additional expansion projects have been announced in several cities, including Fez, Tiznit, and Oujda.

== History ==
The main Technopark site in Casablanca is located in a building originally constructed for the customs administration. Following the relocation of this administration to Rabat in the late 1990s, the building remained unused and was subsequently repurposed as a technology park.

The building was inaugurated in 2000 by King Mohammed VI, and the Technopark officially opened in 2001. Initially, it hosted around fifty companies.

The project received support from the World Bank, particularly in the context of developing business incubation structures.

The Technopark model was subsequently extended beyond Casablanca, with the opening of additional sites in Rabat in 2012, Tanger in 2015, Agadir in 2021, and Essaouira in 2023. Further expansion projects have been announced in several cities, including Fez, Tiznit and Oujda.

In 2025, Technopark partnered with the global innovation platform Plug and Play to launch an acceleration program for Moroccan startups. The program provides mentoring, pilot opportunities with partner companies, and access to national and international investors.

== Organization and activities ==
Technopark operates as both an incubator and a business hosting facility for innovative companies. It provides infrastructure and support services aimed at facilitating the creation and growth of startups.

The activities of hosted companies are primarily concentrated in information technology, consulting, digital services, and other innovation-driven sectors.

== Notable companies ==
Technopark has hosted a number of organizations operating in the technology and services sectors, including:

- Maroc Telecom
- Sagem
- USAID
- Bull Maroc
- Mazars
- Rekrute
