= Infopark, Thrissur =

Business park in Kerala, India

Coordinates: 10.268522°N 76.353194°E

Infopark Thrissur
- Type: Government Owned
- Industry: Information Technology Business Park
- Genre: Infrastructure Service Provider
- Founded: 10 October 2009
- Headquarters: Koratty, Chalakudy, Thrissur
- Key people: Chief Minister of Kerala, Chairman Shri. Rathan U Kelkar IAS, Secretary (Electronics & IT Dept) Mr Susanth Kurunthil, CEO
- Owner: Government of Kerala

InfoPark Thrissur is an information technology park situated in Koratty near Chalakudy of Thrissur District in Kerala. This is the first information technology park in the state that has become operational under the 'Hub and Spoke Model', where InfoPark, Kochi acts as the hub and InfoPark Koratty as the spoke. The park is located 35 km from Kochi, 35 km from Thrissur, 5 km from Chalakudy and around 15 km from the Cochin International Airport at Nedumbassery. It is fully owned by the Government of Kerala. The InfoPark is associated with Kerala State IT Mission and Kerala State Information Technology Infrastructure Ltd.

== Infrastructure ==
The Government of Kerala has allotted 42 acres (170,000 m2) of land for the InfoPark. Currently, InfoPark possesses 30 acres (120,000 m2) of land for the development. The plot that was given to set up the InfoPark earlier housed the Madura Coats factory. InfoPark has planned three phases of development. The Phase I of InfoPark was launched by Kerala Chief Minister, V. S. Achuthanandan on 10 October 2009 with 12 medium-sized companies and an office space of 44,500 sq ft (4,130 m^{2}). Phase II of InfoPark was inaugurated on 8 January 2010, where another 18,240 sq ft (1,695 m^{2}) was added. The construction of a new multistory building was inaugurated by the then Chief Minister of Kerala, Oommen Chandy, on 8 September 2012.

Infopark Thrissur was also granted the Special Economic Zone (SEZ) Status by the Ministry of Commerce, Government of India in 2014 for 18 acres of land wherein the new Multi-storied IT Block ‘INDEEVARAM’ is located. In the Phase III and final phase, Government is planning to develop the 25 acres of InfoPark as a Special Economic Zone (SEZ) where a 2-lakh-sqft building will be constructed. The new upcoming campus, consisting of a multistory building with more than two lakh square feet built-up area, got Special economic zone (SEZ) status from the government of India in July 2014. The nearest major city next to Koratty Infopark is Chalakudy.

== Employment & Companies ==
29 companies are working in Infopark Thrissur campus in its First phase as on 17 March 2016.and around 700 people are employed. The Initial phase of the campus opened up opportunities for Start-ups and Small Medium Businesses. SMB companies like Elemment Facade, Webandcrafts, Nuvento, QBurst, Feathersoft Info Pvt Ltd, EXAR Software Research, and startups like IGOOZ, Abbys, SandsLab, Storybox, GreenEd Multimedia, Sahrdaya Infoteck, SandsLab, Squad Technologies, Braddock Infotech, Strands Energy, FineLab Web Services a Division of WBpro LLC, Cent Technologies, Bharthi Yashloyd etc., are the present companies functioning at InfoPark.

== Indeevaram ==
The First Multi-storeyed IT building of the campus is named as ‘INDEEVARAM’, means Blue Lotus. The Building is located in 6 acres at the Special Economic Zone area of the campus. Total Built-up area is 3.3 lakhs sq.ft with floors from Basement to 6th apart from the terrace floor reserved for Food Courts and other amenities. The Building was inaugurated by the Hon’ble Chief Minister of Kerala, Shri. Oommen Chandy on 21 January 2016.

== See also ==
- InfoPark Kochi
- Infopark, Cherthala
