= Irumpanam =

- Ward
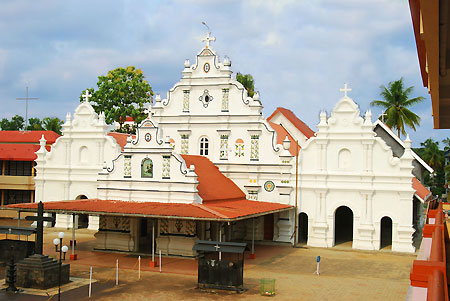
- Karingachira Church, Irumpanam

- Location in Kerala, India Irumpanam (India)
- Coordinates: 9.973°N 76.352°E
- Country: India
- State: Kerala
- District: Ernakulam

Languages
  - Official: Malayalam, English
- Time zone: UTC+5:30 (IST)
- Lok Sabha Constituency: Ernakulam

Irumpanam is a suburban region of the city of Kochi in the state of Kerala, India. It is an important industrial region, housing many companies such as Indian Oil Corporation, Bharat Petroleum and Hindustan Petroleum. The region is the northernmost part of the Thrippunithura municipality, and is situated 8 km (5.0 mi) from the Kochi city centre. The Seaport-Airport Road (SPAP Road) passes through this place.

Irumpanam is located adjacent to the Kakkanad region, a major industrial, educational and technology hub of Kochi.

== Educational Institutions ==
- Vocational Higher Secondary School, Irumpanam
- S.N.D.P Lower Primary School, Irumpanam
- LPS, Irumpanam
- Lake Mount Global Public School
- Saraswathy Mandiram English Medium School
- Traum Academy for German and French Languages

== Etymology ==
The place is believed to have been named "Hidumba Vanam" in the Mahabharatha era. Scholars speculate that Irumpanam is a corrupted version of Hidumba vanam.

== Demographics ==
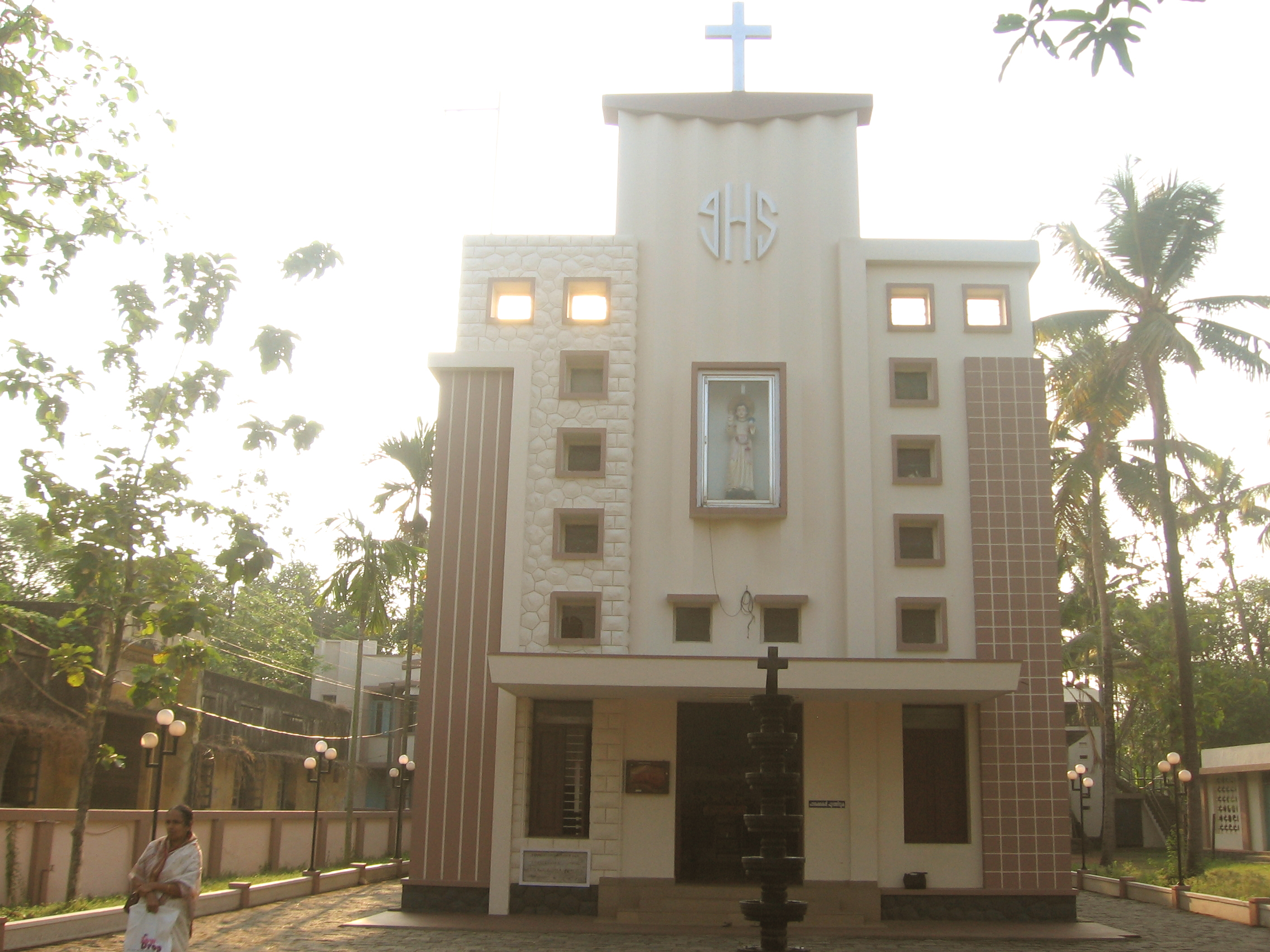
Infant Jesus Church

Irumpanam is a part of Thrippunithura municipality in Ernakulam district in the Indian state of Kerala. As of 2001 India census, irumpanam had a handsome population. Males constitute 50% of the population and females 50%. Irumpanam has an average literacy rate of 89%, higher than the national average of 59.5%: male literacy is 90%, and female literacy is 88%. In Irumpanam, 10% of the population is under 6 years of age.

== Administration ==
Irumpanam is still a part of Piravom assembly constituency. Irumpanam was administered under Thiruvankulam Grama Panchayath under the Kerala Panchayati Raj act. In 2010, as a result of the re-organization of administrative divisions in Kerala, Irumpanam was merged with the Thripunithura municipality.

== Places to visit ==
=== Karingachira Church ===
A Syrian Jacobite Church built in 722 AD near Hill Palace, Thripunitura. The church is named after Saint George. The Katthanar (Vicar) of Karingachira was considered the representative of the Nasarani community of the erstwhile Cochin State. The Saint Parumala Thirumeni was ordained as a deacon in this church in 1857 AD.

This Church was elevated as a Cathedral by Patriarch Ignatius Zakka I Iwas in 2004.

=== Makaliyam Sreeramaswamy Temple ===
The Makaliyam Sreeramaswamy Temple is a famous temple of the Hindu deity Sri Rama. The temple is one among the few temples where Sri Rama is the deity. This temple is said to be built by the Chera Dynasty.

=== Vallikkav Bhagavathi Temple ===
The Vallikkav Bhagavathi Temple is a Temple surrounded by roots and has no statue of Devi. Vallikkav Bhagavathi is considered as Chottanikkara Devi

=== Perunninakulam Temple ===
Perunninakulam Temple is a temple of Lord Shiva with Lord Ganapathi. It is one of the few temples with a 'svayamboo vigraha', meaning the stone idol appeared on its own from the earth. The temple has a beautiful Ambala Kulam or pond.

== Economic activities ==
Irimpanam is home to large petroleum corporations as well as numerous small scale and cottage industries. TRACO Cable Company, a cable manufacturer, as well major oil corporations like BPCL, IOC, HPCL have their presence here. Agriculture has fallen from the status of the prime means of livelihood in Irumpanam. The major produces include coconuts, arecanuts, nutmeg, and pepper. Rice cultivation is on the decline.

Most people are employed in the city of Kochi, major employers being the Kochi Refineries, HOC, FACT and the Government of Kerala.
