= Koratty =

- census town
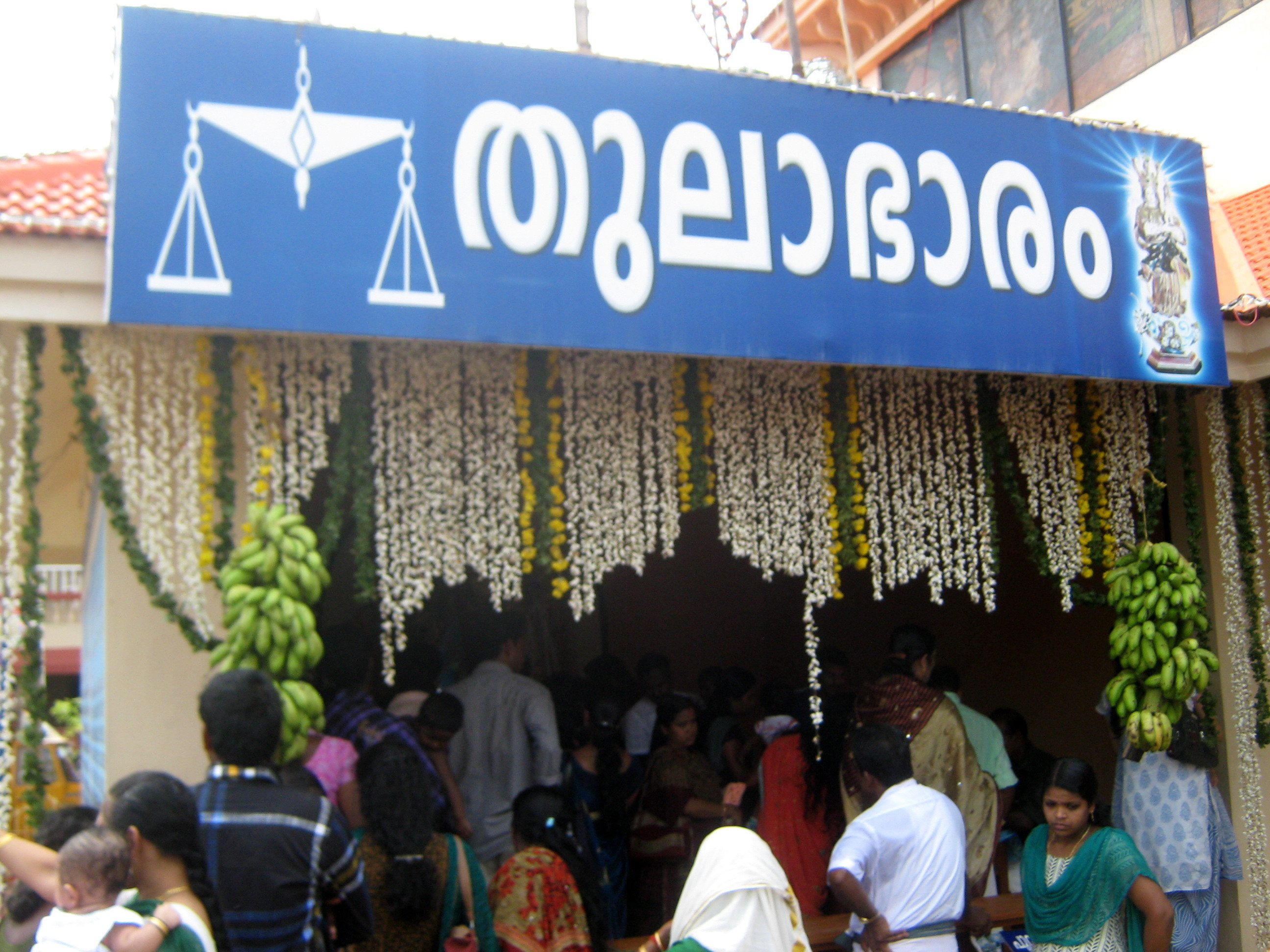
- Koratty Muthy festival

- Location in Kerala, India Koratty (India)
- Coordinates: 10.265°N 76.347°E
- Country: India
- State: Kerala
- District: Thrissur

Government
  - Body: Koratty Grama panchayath

Population (2001)
  - Total: 17,463

Languages
  - Official: Malayalam, English
- Time zone: UTC+5:30 (IST)
- PIN: 680308
- Telephone code: +91480
- Vehicle registration: KL -08/ KL-45 / KL-64

Koratty is a census town in Thrissur district in the Indian state of Kerala. It is a main centre of Marian pilgrimage.

== Demographics ==
As of 2011 India census, Koratty had a population of 17,618. Males constitute 49% of the population and females 51%. Koratty has an average literacy rate of 96.72%, higher than the national average of 74%: male literacy is 97.94%, and female literacy is 95.58%. In Koratty, 9% of the population is under the age of six.

== Tourism & Pilgrimage Travel ==
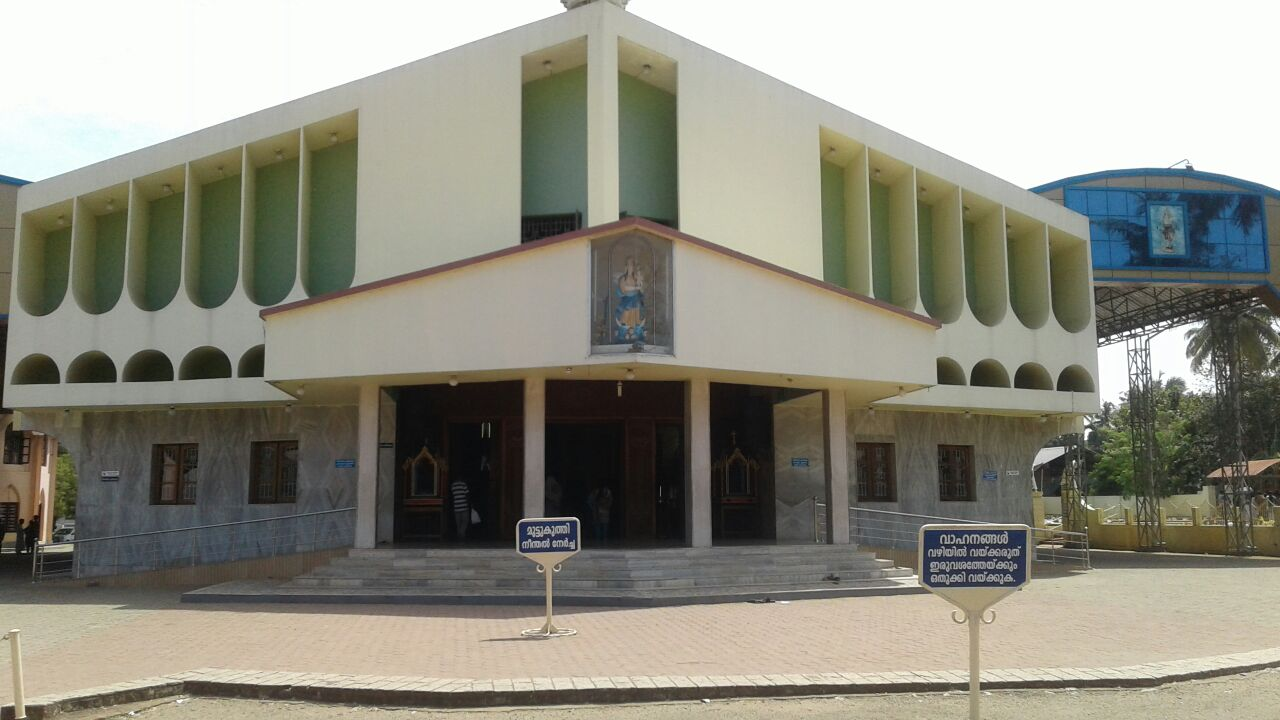
church of koratty muthy

=== Korattymuthy Shrine (St. Mary's Syro-Malabar Catholic Church,) Koratty ===
St. Mary's Syro-Malabar Catholic Church, Koratty is one of the biggest Marian/Christian/Catholic pilgrimage travel destination of Kerala in India. Korattymuthy Shrine is a Pilgrimage centre in Kerala. It is also known as the Lourdes of Kerala. Korattymuthy- Our Lady with Poovan Bananas is the well known name for Holy Mary or Mother Mary here. Devotees from all over the world visit Koratty annually. Every year the Feast of Koratty Muthy will commence on 1st Sunday after 10 October. The flag for the feast will be hoisted on the previous Wednesday. Whole month of October will be the feast days. However next two Sundays are important as Main Feast . The Sunday comes after the main Feast knowwn as "Ettamidam" and second Sunday after the main Feast known as "Pathinanchamidam".

=== Saint Antony's Shrine, Koratty ===
St. Antony’s Shrine situated in Koratty, Thrissur, Kerala is a pilgrim centre associated with devotion to St. Antony attracting visitors for prayers. The Shrine referred as the "Padua of Korratty" belongs to the Archdiocese of Verapoly and is under the pastoral and administrative care of the Metropolitan Archbishop of Verapoly, Archbishop Joseph Kalathiparambil. The Shrine located near national highway 544 at Koratty was the fore vision of Venerable Rt. Rev. Dr. Joseph Attipetty back in 1960’s and was established in 1974, during the time of Rt. Rev. Dr. Joseph Kelanthara in dedication to Immaculate Mary and was given the name “Immaculate Conception Church”. “Novenapalli” (Novena Church) the name by which St. Antony’s Shrine, Koratty is known for is established in the name of Immaculate Mary (Immaculate Conception Church). Therefore, seeking veneration of Immaculate Mary and St. Antony is one of the peculiarities found only at this Shrine. The blessings and grace of both Mother Mary and St. Antony showers upon everyone who comes to this pilgrimage centre. May the everlasting prayers of St. Antony and Immaculate Mother help the Devotees to know and love Jesus more.

Main feasts at the shrine — Amala-Antonian Celebrations

- 18 February 2025 — Feast of the Holy Tongue of St. Antony
- Second week in June — Koratty Oottunercha Thirunal,
- 15 August — Feast of Assumption of Mother Mary & Birth Feast of St. Antony,
- 8 September — Feast of The Nativity of the Blessed Virgin Mary,
- October — Month of Our Lady of Rosary,
- Second week in December — Mediatory Feasts of Immaculate Mary & St. Antony

=== Other religious places ===
Main Hindu Temples located in Koratty are Sree Rameswaram Mahadeva Temple, Thaliyaparambil rudhiramala bagavathi azhuvancheri muthappan temple & Sreedharmashasta temple, Khannanagar.

== Industry ==
Koratty was famous for its industrial units. Vaigai Thread Processors Ltd. (formerly J&P Coats, Jamuna Threads & Madura Coats and Coats Viella (I) Ltd. The Vaigai Thread Processors, formerly J&P Coats, was started on 98 acres of land given on a 99-year lease by the government in 1952. In 1980, it merged with Madura Coats Limited and it was declared locked out in 1993 following a labour dispute.

Another major industry was in the Public Sector under the control of Government of India — Government of India Press, Koratty (GIPK). The press was started in 1966 on a 100-acre land. It was the one and only Indian Government controlled press in Kerala. The press was started in Koratty due to the intervention of Panampilly Govinda Menon, former CM of Travancore-Cochin region and renowned Kerala politician. He was a union minister and pushed for the establishment of press for giving more job opportunities for the local people. Earlier it had been proposed to convert it into a security press for the printing of Stamp Papers and Postal Stamps etc. At that time there were 300 workers. By 1972, the number of workers rose to 425 working in two shifts. As a part of modernization drive & due to non-feasibility, Govt of India UM has decided to shut down its operation. In 2017, the union cabinet decided to merge the Koratty unit with Nashik unit. Only 14 workers were left while press stopped functioning, 12 merged with Nashik press, while the remaining two merged with Delhi press.

Other industries like Carborandum Universal, Kerala Chemicals & Proteins Ltd (KCPL) are also located here.

Panampilly Govinda Menon, former Chief Minister of Kerala and former Central Cabinet Minister for Railways, was the frontrunner in bringing these industries to Koratty and nearby areas as he was a native of Kathikudam near Koratty.

Koratty have their own news portal name Ente Koratty.

MVS Info Tech is headquartered in Koratty. MVS Group is also planning to set up their IT campus by 2014 at Koratty

== Kinfra Park ==
Another industrial area situated in Koratty is Kinfra Small Industries Promotion Park (KSIPP), lot of small scale industrial units are situated inside the park. It is located 0.5 km east of Koratty Jn. on Konoor Rd. A new venture for manufacturing and quality control of Ayurvedic medicines promoted jointly by Kinfra & and major Ayurvedic Medicine manufactures (Pankajakasthuri, The Arya Vaidya Pharmacy, Vaidyaratnam Oushadasala, Nagarjuna, Sitaram, Sreedhareeyam, S.D. Pharmacy, Kandamkulathy, Dhanwantari and Kerala Ayurveda Pharmacy) namely Confederation of Ayurvedic Renaissance-Keralam Pvt Ltd (CARe-Keralam), is also upcoming in 10 acres (40,000 m^{2}) of land near Koratty Kinfra Park.

== Infopark Thrissur ==
An IT park, Infopark Thrissur, became operational in this town on 10 October 2009. More than 30 companies are functioning in this park. Infopark Thrissur is expected to provide direct employment to 3,000 people and may boost the real estate sector in this area. The new upcoming campus consisting of a multistory building, with more than one lakh square feet built up area got Special economic zone (SEZ) status from government of India in July 2014. and will be known as 'INFOPARK -Koratty'

== Educational Institutions ==
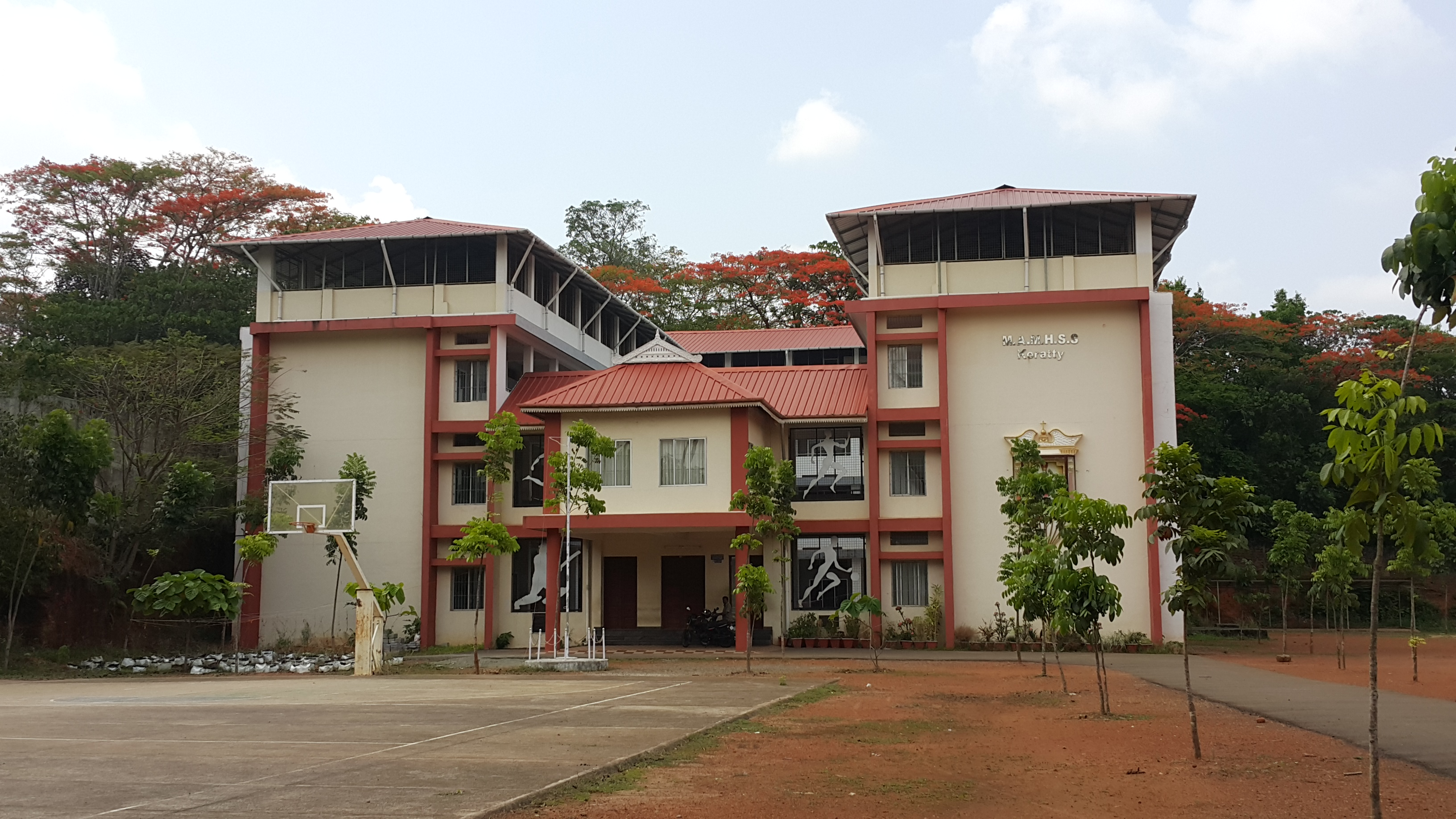
MAMHSS Koratty

Several educational institutions are located in Koratty Town and nearby areas. Mar Augustine Memorial Higher Secondary School (MAMHS), Little Flower Convent Higher Secondary School (LFCGHSS), Government Polytechnic College (GPC), Naipunnya Institute of Management and Information Technology, Perpetual Succour Higher Secondary School (PSHSS), Thirumudikkunnu are the major institutions of Koratty.
