= MCL =

MCL may refer to:

== Medicine ==
- Mantle cell lymphoma
- Mast cell leukemia
- Medial collateral ligament
- Medical Center Leeuwarden
- Microlitre (μL), or microliter
- Midclavicular line
- Mucocutaneous leishmaniasis
- Multiple cutaneous leiomyoma
- Myeloid cell leukemia sequence 1 (MCL1)

== Companies and organizations ==
- MCL Cafeterias, a chain of American cafeteria-style restaurants
- Mahanadi Coalfields Limited, a coal-producing company in India
- Marine Corps League
- Movement for Christian Liberation
- Malabar Cements Limited a cement company in Kerala
- Mysore Cements Limited a cement company

== Science, engineering and industry ==
- Maximum contaminant level, standards that are set by the United States Environmental Protection Agency for drinking water quality
- Mid-Canada Line of early-warning radar stations

== Computer Science and mathematics ==
- 1150 in Roman numerals
- Macintosh Common Lisp
- McLaughlin group (mathematics), a sporadic simple group
- Monte Carlo localization
- Multicollinearity

== Other uses ==
- Michigan Compiled Laws
- Minecraft Legends, a Minecraft spin-off
- Maltese Challenge League, second division association football league in Malta
- Master of Comparative Law, an advanced degree offered by some law schools
