= Transformers and Electricals Kerala Limited =

Transformer company based in Kochi, India

Transformers And Electricals Kerala Limited

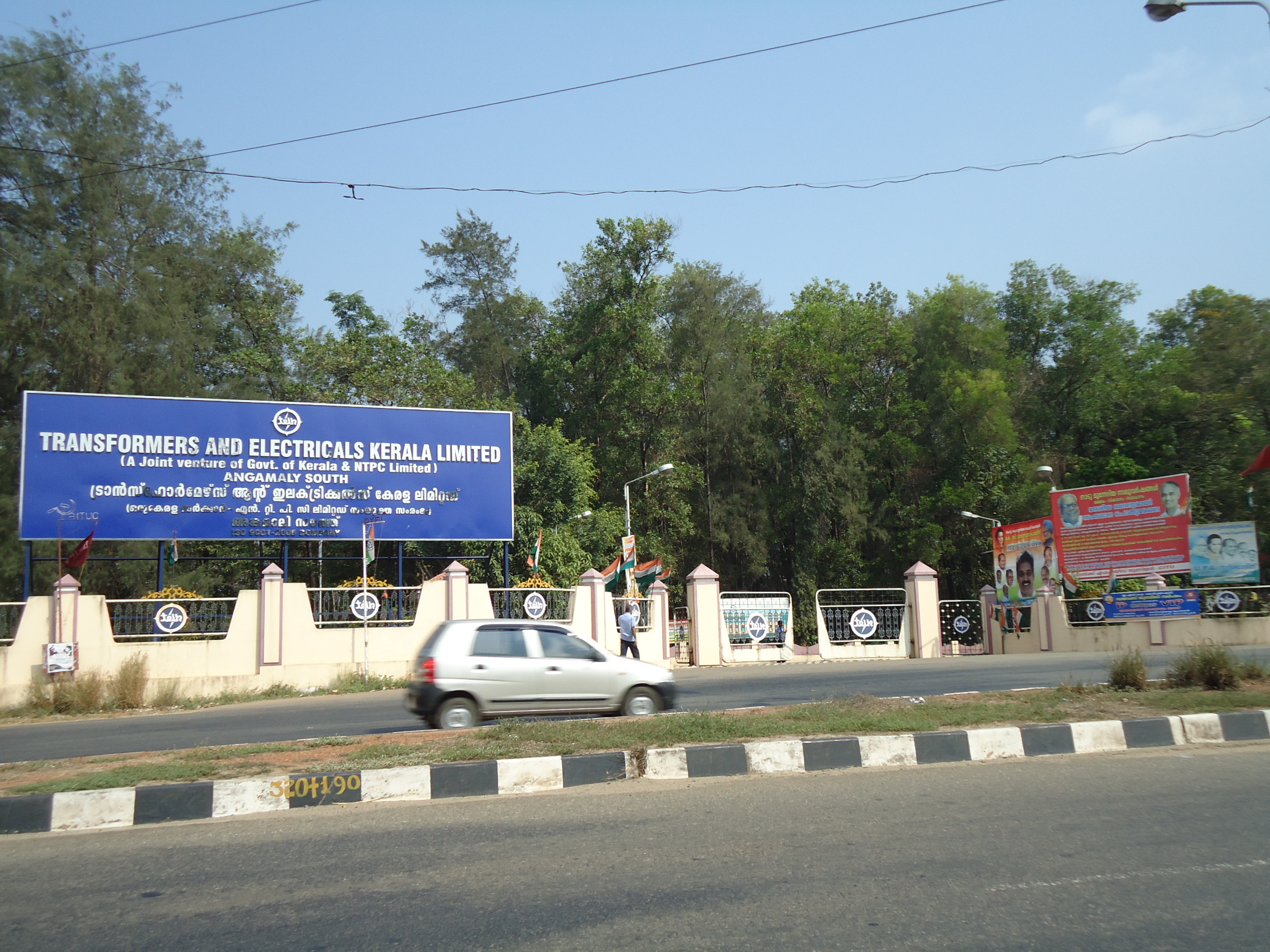
- Type: Public Sector Undertaking
- Industry: Electrical Manufacturing and Sales
- Founded: 9 December 1963; 62 years ago in Angamaly
- Headquarters: Angamaly (Ernakulam district), Kerala, India
- Key people: N C Mohanan (Chairman); Prasad B (Managing Director)
- Products: Power transformers, current transformers, voltage transformers
- Owner: Joint venture between Government of Kerala and NTPC Limited
- Number of employees: 658
- Website: www.telk.com

Transformers and Electricals Kerala Limited (TELK) is a public sector undertaking in Kerala incorporated in 1963 under an agreement with Kerala State Industrial Development Corporation (KSIDC) and Hitachi Limited of Japan. The company is located at Angamaly, near Kochi, in the state of Kerala. The company was formed to design and manufacture extra High Voltage Electrical equipment in India. The first product rolled out from TELK in 1966 is power transformers. In 2009, TELK became a joint venture company of the Government of Kerala and NTPC Limited. The equipment's TELK manufactures includes power transformers, current transformers, voltage transformers, SF6 Circuit Breakers and reactors.

== History ==
In 1963, the Kerala government decided to form a company that designs, manufactures and supplies power transformers in India. The decision was made to form the company with the technical and financial collaboration of Hitachi Limited, a Japan-based company. The company has supplied and installed first power transformer (rating 4 megavolt-ampere, 66/11 kilowatt) to Kerala State Electricity Board in 1966. In the year 1972, the company entered into International business at first and exported 2 nos power transformer to Tanzania. In 1977 TELK, became the first company to manufacture 400 kV transformers in India and installed first 400 kV Class power transformers in 1978. When the Tata Power Company Ltd started a 500 MW Thermal Power plant at Trombay, Mumbai, TELK installed 600 MVA generator transformer for the unit in 1982. In the 1990s TELK revamped its export activities and exported transformers to the Sultanate of Oman and 330 kV Gas Circuit Breakers to Nigeria in 1994. The products are also exported to other countries like Indonesia, Iran, Cambodia, Malaysia, Vietnam, and Singapore. The biggest power transformer ever made in the country (rating 630 MVA Transformers) for Tarapur Atomic Power Station, Tarapur, Maharashtra was installed by TELK in 2003. Because of the financial crisis, the company got referred to Board for Industrial and Financial Reconstruction and started making financial losses. In 2007 the State government take initiative for the rescue and took the initiative to partner TELK with NTPC Limited. In June 2007, the government, NTPC Limited and TELK signed the Business Collaboration and Shareholders’ Agreement.

== Products ==
=== Power transformers ===
TELK design and manufacture every single transformer project according to individual customer requirements such as voltage, power system parameters, location geography, system disturbance level and many more including National / international standards. The company manufactures transformers as per the Japanese technology. The range of power transformers offered is from 20MVA to 315 MVA (3 phase) / 825 MVA (Single phase bank). The products manufactured are according to International Electrotechnical Commission, American National Standards Institute, IS, BS and other international standards.

=== Current transformers ===
A current transformer (CT) is a type of transformer that is used to measure alternating current (AC). TELK started manufacture of current transformers from 1968 in collaboration with Hitachi Ltd. These transformers are hermetically sealed, oil impregnated, paper insulated and oil filled outdoor type current transformers up to 400 kV. The winding and insulation of 400 kV current transformers are carried out in a humidity controlled, dust free atmosphere. TELK has supplied many transformers to various state electricity boards, organizations and other utilities.

=== Voltage transformers ===
Voltage transformers (VT), also known as potential transformers (PT), are a parallel connected type of instrument transformer, used for metering and protection in high-voltage circuits or phasor phase shift isolation. TELK manufactures hermetically sealed, oil impregnated paper insulated, oil filled, porcelain type outdoor electromagnetic potential transformers up to 245 kV.

=== Transformer bushings ===
A transformer bushing is an insulated device that allows an electrical conductor to pass safely through a grounded conducting barrier. TELK was the first Indian company to manufacture 420 kV oil impregnated paper condenser bushings in the year 1970. Transformers manufactured by TELK, are fitted with their own make bushings and bushings are also being sold to other transformer manufacturers.

== Achievements ==
In the Year	Achievement
2017	Accredited with ISO 9001:2015 Certification

== See also ==
- Kerala Electrical and Allied Engineering Company
