= List of government of India establishments in Kerala =

In the state of Kerala there are various establishments owned, managed and controlled by Government of India. These establishments in Kerala are largely government offices and departments, Public sector undertakings, jointly owned entities, entities in which Government of India has stakes or shareholding, defence and strategic establishments etc. As per 2011 Census of India there are nearly 50,600 permanent central government employees in Kerala who works in various establishments.

== Offices/Departments ==
This is the list of offices or departments that have specific stations across Kerala

=== Thiruvananthapuram ===
- All India Radio
- All India Council for Technical Education Regional Office.
- Central Board of Film Certification
- Central Bureau of Investigation, (Special Crime Branch)
- Central Ground Water Board (Kerala unit office).
- CGO Complex, Poonkulam.
- Central Public Works Department
- Defence Pension Disbursing Office
- Doordarshan Kendra, Kudappanakunnu
- Employees' Provident Fund Organisation Zonal/Regional office.
- Employees' State Insurance - Sub regional Office
- GST (Intelligence)
- Indian Meteorological Department
- Income Tax Office, Kowdiar
- Khadi and Village Industry Commission (State Office).
- National Bank for Agriculture and Rural Development Regional Office
- National Commission for Scheduled Castes (Kerala Lakshadweep office)
- National Highways Authority of India
- Office of the Principal Accountant General (A & E) Kerala
- Power Grid Corporation of India, Kaniyapuram
- Press Information Bureau
- Regional Outreach Bureau of Ministry of I&B
- Regional Passport Office.
- Reserve Bank of India

=== Kollam ===
- Central Excise & GST Office
- Defence Pension Disbursing Office
- Employees' Provident Fund Organisation Sub Regional office
- Employees' State Insurance - Sub regional Office
- Income Tax Office

=== Alappuzha ===
- All India Radio
- Income Tax Office

=== Kottayam ===
- Central Public Works Department
- Central Excise & GST Office
- Defence Pension Disbursing Office
- Employees' Provident Fund Organisation Sub Regional office
- Income Tax Office
- Rubber Board

=== Kochi ===
- All India Radio
- Central Administrative Tribunal, Kaloor
- Central Bureau of Investigation (Anti Corruption Division)
- Central Public Works Department
- Central Water Commission
- CGO Complex, Kakkanad
- Cochin Port Trust
- Coconut Development Board
- Coir Board of India
- Customs House, Willingdon Island
- Defence Pension Disbursing Office
- Directorate of Cashewnut & Cocoa Development, Kochi
- Directorate General of Foreign Trade - Regional Authority, Kakkanad
- Director General of Light Houses and Light shipping.
- Directorate of Revenue Intelligence
- Employees' Provident Fund Organisation Sub Regional office
- Employees' State Insurance - Sub regional Office
- Enforcement Directorate, Kochi
- Fishery Survey of India
- Geological Survey of India, Marine and Coastal Survey.
- GST (Intelligence)
- Income Tax Office
- Lakshadweep U.T. Administration Office.
- Marine Products Export Development Authority
- Narcotics Control Bureau, Zonal Office.
- National Investigation Agency
- Petroleum and Explosives Safety Organisation, Ernakulam Sub Circle office.
- Regional Agmark Laboratory, Willingdon Island
- Regional Passport Office.
- Registrar of Companies, Thrikkakkara
- Reserve Bank of India
- Spices Board of India

=== Thrissur ===
- All India Radio
- Archaeological Survey of India, Thrissur Circle.
- Audit General Office
- Central Excise & GST Office
- Defence Pension Disbursing Office
- Doordarshan Kendra
- Employees' State Insurance - Regional Office
- Income Tax Office
- Khadi and Village Industry Commission (Sub office and Sliver Plant)

=== Kozhikode ===
- All India Radio
- Central Excise & GST Office
- Central Public Works Department
- Directorate of Arecanut and Spices Development.
- Directorate of Revenue Intelligence
- Enforcement Directorate, Kozhikode
- Employees' Provident Fund Organisation Sub Regional office
- Employees' State Insurance - Sub regional Office
- GST (Intelligence)
- Income Tax Office, Mananchira
- Regional Passport Office.
- Western Ghats Field Research Centre of Zoological Survey of India

=== Kannur ===
- All India Radio
- Central Excise & GST Office
- Defence Pension Disbursing Office
- Employees' Provident Fund Organisation Sub Regional office
- Income Tax Office

=== Others ===
- India Post has around 5058 post offices across the state.
- Indian Railways has 1054 kms of railway line, 178 railway stations and two railway divisions of Southern Railway zone in the state.
- Bharat Sanchar Nigam Limited has more than 970 Telephone exchange in Kerala.
- Income Tax Department also has offices at Thiruvalla, Thodupuzha, Guruvayur, Kalpetta, Tirur Palakkad and Kasaragod besides 8 stations mentioned above.
- All India Radio/ Prasar Bharati has stations at Devikulam and Manjeri and relay stations at Punalur, Kayamkulam, Pathanamthitta, Painavu, Kalpetta and Kasaragod.
- All the twelve Public sector banks in India has a total of 3,285 branches in Kerala.
- DGLL has twenty light houses in Kerala coast.

== Public Sector Undertakings ==
- BrahMos Aerospace Thiruvananthapuram Ltd.
- Cochin Shipyard
- Fertilisers and Chemicals Travancore, Kochi
- GAIL
- Hindustan Insecticides, Eloor.
- HLL Lifecare, Thiruvananthapuram
- HMT Limited, Kalamassery
- Indian Rare Earths (Chavara & Aluva)
- Indian Telephone Industries Limited, Palakkad.
- Kochi Refineries
- National Textile Corporation mills at Thrissur, Kannur, Kollam.
- Rajiv Gandhi Combined Cycle Power Plant, Kayamkulam
- Hindustan Aeronautics Limited (Strategic Electronics Factory), Kasaragod.

=== Disinvested entities ===
- Hindustan Newsprint
- Bharat Heavy Electricals Limited - Electrical Machines Ltd., Kasaragod.
- Government of India Press, Koratty. - Closed and shifted to Nashik.

== Educational Institutes ==
- AMU Malappuram Campus
- Central University of Kerala, Kasaragod
- Central Institute of Fisheries Nautical and Engineering Training, Kochi
- CIPET - IPT Kochi
- IIM Kozhikode
- Indian Institute of Mass Communication, Kottayam
- Indian Institute of Science Education and Research, Thiruvananthapuram
- Indian Institute of Space Science and Technology, Trivandrum
- Indian Institutes of Information Technology (IIIT Pala Kottayam)
- IIT Palakkad
- Indian Maritime University - Kochi campus
- National Institute of Electronics & Information Technology, Kozhikode
- National Institute of Fashion Technology Kannur
- National University of Advanced Legal Studies, Kochi
- National Institute of Technology Calicut

== Scientific and Research Institutes ==
- Central Coir Research Institute, Alappuzha
- C-DAC Thiruvananthapuram
- Centre for Marine Living Resources & Ecology, Kochi
- Centre for Materials for Electronics Technology, Thrissur.
- Central Institute of Fisheries Technology, Kochi
- Central Marine Fisheries Research Institute, Kochi
- Central Plantation Crops Research Institute, Kayamkulam
- Central Plantation Crops Research Institute, Kasaragod
- Clinical Research Unit (Unani), Aluva.
- Central Tuber Crops Research Institute, Trivandrum
- Fluid Control Research Institute, Palakkad
- Indian Institute of Science Education and Research, Thiruvananthapuram
- Indian Institute of Spices Research, Kozhikode
- Indian Rare Earths Research Center, Kollam
- ISRO Inertial Systems Unit, Thiruvananthapuram
- Jawaharlal Nehru Tropical Botanic Garden and Research Institute, Trivandrum
- Liquid Propulsion Systems Centre, Thiruvananthapuram
- National Ayurveda Research Institute for Panchakarma, Cheruthuruthi.
- National Centre for Earth Science Studies, Thiruvananthapuram
- National Homoeopathy Research Institute in Mental Health, Kottayam.
- National Institute for Interdisciplinary Science and Technology, Trivandrum.
- National Institute of Oceanography, regional laboratory.
- Naval Physical and Oceanographic Laboratory, Kochi
- Rajiv Gandhi Centre for Biotechnology, Thiruvananthapuram
- Regional Ayurveda Research Institute, Thiruvananthapuram.
- Rubber Research Institute of India, Kottayam.
- Siddha Regional Research Institute, Thiruvananthapuram.
- Sugarcane Breeding Institute Research Center (ICAR), Kannur
- Sree Chitra Tirunal Institute for Medical Sciences and Technology, Trivandrum
- Vikram Sarabhai Space Centre, Thumba

== Joint ventures ==
=== With Government of Kerala ===
- Indian Institute of Information Technology, Kottayam (Public–private partnership)
- Kerala School of Mathematics, Kozhikode
- Kochi Metro Rail Limited
- Oil Palm India Limited, Kottayam
- Rehabilitation Plantations Ltd., Punalur

== Defence Establishments ==
- Southern Air Command (India), Thiruvananthapuram
- Southern Naval Command, Kochi
- Indian Naval Academy, Kannur.
- Military Station of Indian Army, Thiruvananthapuram, Pangode
- Naval Armament Depot, Aluva.
- NIRDESH, Kozhikode.
- Kannur Cantonment Board

=== Paramilitary ===
- District Headquarters and Air enclave of Indian Coast Guard, Kochi.
- Indian Coast Guard Station, Vizhinjam.
- Indian Coast Guard Station, Beypore
- Recruits Training Center of Central Reserve Police Force at Peringome
- Central Reserve Police Force Group Center, Pallippuram, Thiruvananthapuram
- Border Security Force, 184th Battalion, Chekkiad
- Indo-Tibetan Border Police, 27th Battalion, Nooranad.

== See also ==
- Public sector undertakings in Kerala
