= BevQ =

Virtual queue mobile application

- Screenshot
- Original author: Kerala State Beverages Corporation
- Developer: Faircode Technologies
- Initial release: 27 May 2020; 5 years ago
- Stable release: v8.0 (Android) v2.0 (iOS) / 28 August 2020; 5 years ago
- Written in: React Native, NodeJs
- Operating system: Android, iOS
- Platform: Android, iOS
- Size: 9.7Mb (Android); 27Mb (iOS)
- Available in: English, Malayalam
- Type: Food & Drink
- Website: Official website

BevQ is a queue management mobile application developed by Faircode Technologies of Kochi, Kerala. It is provided by the Kerala State Beverages Corporation under Government of Kerala.

== History ==
This app was released together by the Government of Kerala and the Kerala State Beverages Corporation in order to implement social distancing in the liquor stores Kerala in the case of the COVID-19 pandemic in Kerala and to reduce the congestion of people. The BevQ App was released by Faircode Technologies on 27 May 2020 on the Google Play Store.

In January 2021, the app was withdrawn as bars had opened.

In June 2021, there was a commitment from the Kerala CM that the App will be relaunched again. It has been reported that over 132,000 new users downloaded the app in the 48 hours after the announcement.

== Achievements ==
The BEVQ app, which works only in the state of Kerala, beat all other Indian food and drink apps in 2020 to see the highest growth in year-on-year sessions, according to the State of Mobile 2021 report by App Annie. The app even beat the likes of Domino’s, which is used all across India.

Around 300 government Liquor shops and 900 private liquor shops were enlisted in the platform. More than 200 million unique users registered in the platform. About 250,000 tokens were given out a day.
