= Department of Tourism (Kerala) =

Government body

Agency overview
- Formed: 1995
- Jurisdiction: Kerala
- Headquarters: Thiruvananthapuram (8°30′28″N 76°57′13″E)
- Annual budget: ₹424.5494 crore (US$44 million) (2026–27, revised)
- Minister responsible: P. C. Vishnunadh, Minister for Tourism and Culture
- Agency executives: Sri.K. Biju IAS, Govt Secretary; Smt. Sikha Surendran IAS, Director of Tourism
- Parent agency: Government of Kerala
- Child agencies: KTDC (Kerala Tourism Development Council); Kerala Tourism Infrastructure Limited
- Website: keralatourism.gov.in www.keralatourism.org

The Department of Tourism is a major government ministry under the Kerala Government that regulates and supervises tourism in Kerala. Kerala Tourism is the fastest growing state tourism department in the country and the ministry has been often adjudged as key department that aggressively worked on to make Kerala Tourism into Top 100 Superbrands.

== History ==
Government of Kerala trended to ignore its tourism potential completely until the late 1980s, despite the strong marketing efforts done by leading private tour agencies. This even forced WTTC, often referring Kerala as a late-comer to the tourism sector.

The potentiality of tourism was first identified during last days of Travancore Monarchy. It was 1st Prince Col. Goda Varma Raja (Husband of H.H Queen of Travancore, Karthika Thirunal), while spending his honeymoon holidays at Kovalam's Halcyon Castle, discovered the immense possibility of exploring the kingdom's tourism opportunities. As 1st Prince, he was in-charge of receiving state guests and often several visiting dignitaries used to praise the natural beauty, which made him realize to seriously concentrate in developing the industry. However his idea received a cold response at Royal Court, forcing him to start his own venture to popularize key tourist destinations. The attitude of ignoring tourism continued even after Independence, leaving the sector purely driven by few private ventures and hotel chains.

During the 1960s Kovalam soon rose into international fame, as one of the major centers of hippie culture in India, which started massive influx of foreign tourists, bringing large amount of much needed foreign exchange. It was at this point of Kerala Government, slowly started realizing the importance of tourism. Hailed as one of the first policy that underlines the importance of Public-Private Partnership, the policy helped Kerala to fuel its strong growth in Tourism sector.

== Administration ==
Unlike other departments, Tourism Department is considered as independent department and a field agency. It has its headquarters located at Park View, in Thiruvananthapuram.

The Department is headed by a cabinet minister, supported by a Principal secretary. In addition the department has a director and 2 additional directors. There is a council consisting of key tourist players and government officials, which advises the government. There are District Tourism Promotion Councils at each district. The current minister for Tourism is P. C. Vishnunadh.

== Objectives ==
The Key objectives of Kerala Tourism Department is 5 critical and strategic policy:

- Policy: supporting a transparent and inclusive policy process, promoting fair and open competition, strengthening institutional capacity to implement and enforce policies, drawing international support to augment expertise in developing Kerala Tourism
- Product Development: leveraging core strengths, creating new products, building USP, focusing on sustainable development to offer products of international quality, creating enabling investment environment, stimulating demand, promoting partnerships to ensure the flow of funds into the tourism sector. Kerala Tourism Department has developed more than 14 different products
- Marketing: building a brand, emphasizing quality assurances, providing demand-driven information, competing at a global level, collaborating on international and regional platforms to create a highly visible platform for the state.
- Infrastructure: focusing on the core and linkage infrastructure and investing in strategically focused capacity to support development priorities
- Tourism Services: building a critical mass of tourism workers, increasing technical skills, strengthening community entrepreneurial skills, augmenting managerial capacity to build a service sector sensitive to tourists and tourism.

—Kerala’s Approach to Tourism Development: A Case Study, p.10

== See also ==
- Tourist Resorts (Kerala)
- Kerala Tourism Development Corporation
