= Angamaly =

Municipality in Kerala, India

Angamaly Angamali
- Municipality
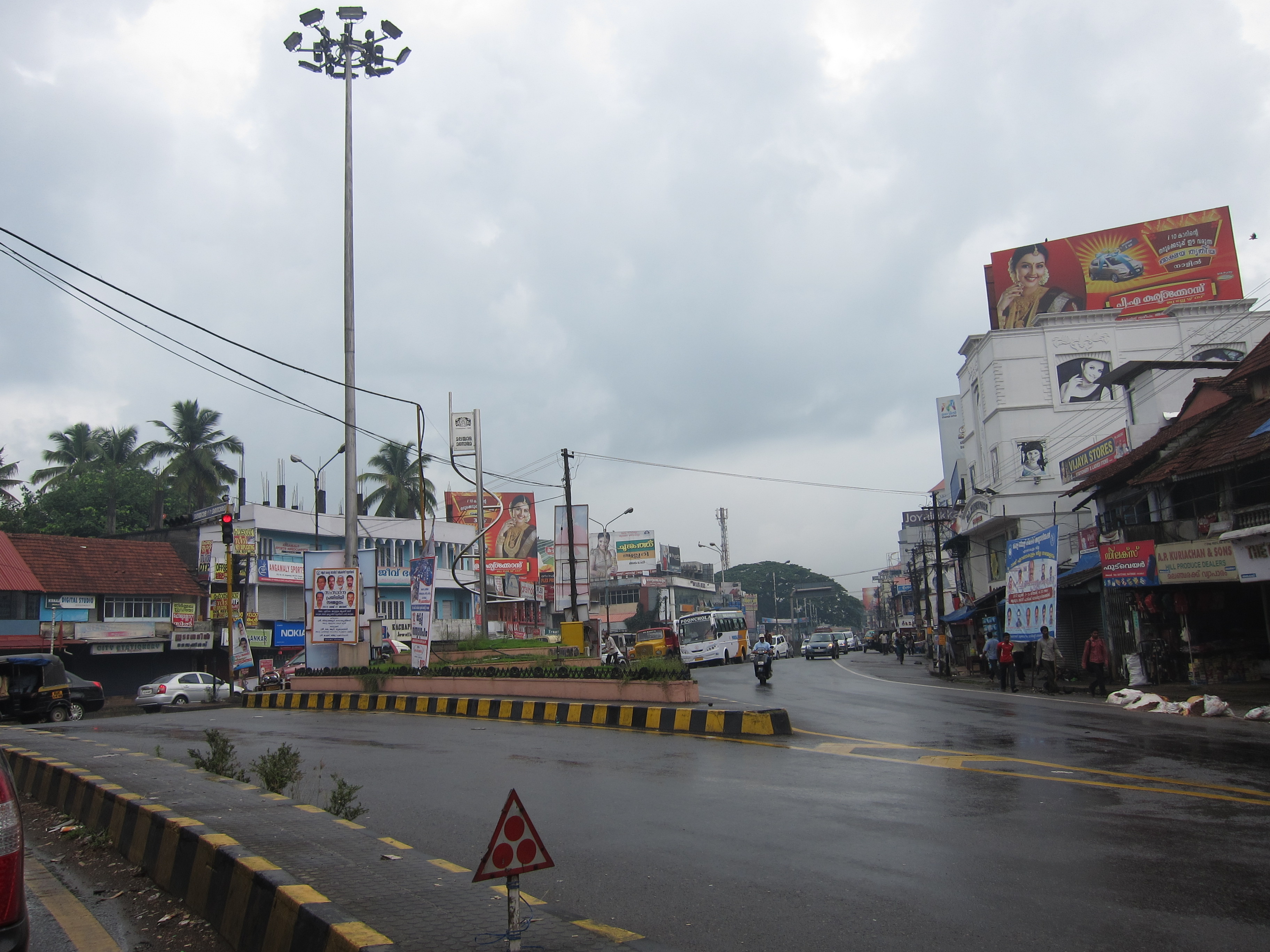
- Angamaly Junction
- Nickname: Airport City
- Location in Kerala, India Angamaly (India)
- Coordinates: 10.196°N 76.386°E
- Country: India
- State: Kerala
- District: Ernakulam
- City UA: Kochi

Government
  - Type: Municipality
  - Body: Angamaly Municipality
  - Chairperson: Reetha Paul (INC)
  - Vice Chairperson: Wilson Mundadan

Area
  - Total: 20.45 km^{2} (7.90 sq mi)
- Elevation: 31 m (102 ft)

Population (2011)
  - Total: 33,465
  - Density: 1,636/km^{2} (4,238/sq mi)

Languages
- Time zone: UTC+5:30 (IST)
- PIN: 683572
- Telephone code: 0484
- Vehicle registration: KL-63
- Sex ratio: 0.9689 ♂/♀
- Website: angamalymunicipality.lsgkerala.gov.in/en

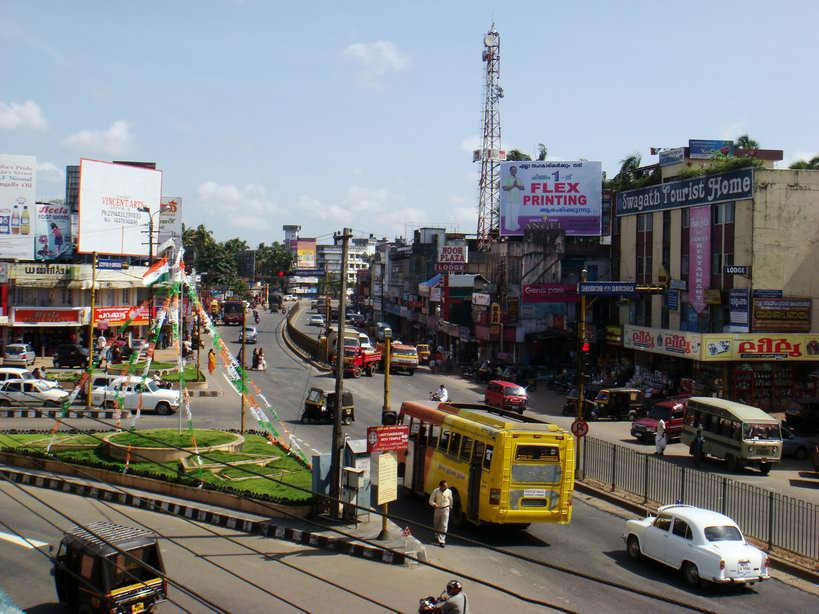
Angamaly Junction

Angamaly (Malayalam pronunciation: [ɐŋgɐmɐːli]) is a municipality in the Ernakulam district of Kerala, India. Angamaly is part of the Kochi metropolitan area and is located northeast of the Kochi city centre. As of the 2011 Indian census, the municipality has a population of 33,465 people and a Population density of 1,633/km^{2} (4,230/sq mi).

== History ==
Several old coins and other artifacts demonstrate that this region was predominantly Buddhist and Jain. Malayatoor Church, an international shrine, is located nearby. Tradition states that Thomas the Apostle visited the region from Kodungaloor port in AD 52. There is evidence of churches in the locality built as early as AD 409 and AD 822. Angamaly was the headquarters of Mar Abraham, the last East Syriac bishop of the Archdiocese of Angamaly.

Originally established as a panchayat in May 1952, Angamaly became a municipality in April 1978 and has been a Ernakulam Assembly constituency since 1965. The area is known for the 1959 Angamaly police firing in which police fired upon protesters who had been demonstrating against Kerala's communist government.

=== Angamaly police firing ===
The Angamaly police firing took place on 13 June 1959, when police opened fire on protesters who had been demonstrating against Kerala's communist government. Seven people were killed, resulting in the intensification of Vimochana Samaram, a protest against the then-communist government.

== Infrastructure ==
Angamaly is situated at the intersection of the Main Central Road and National Highway 544, about 30 km (19 mi) north of the city centre and 7 km from Cochin International Airport.

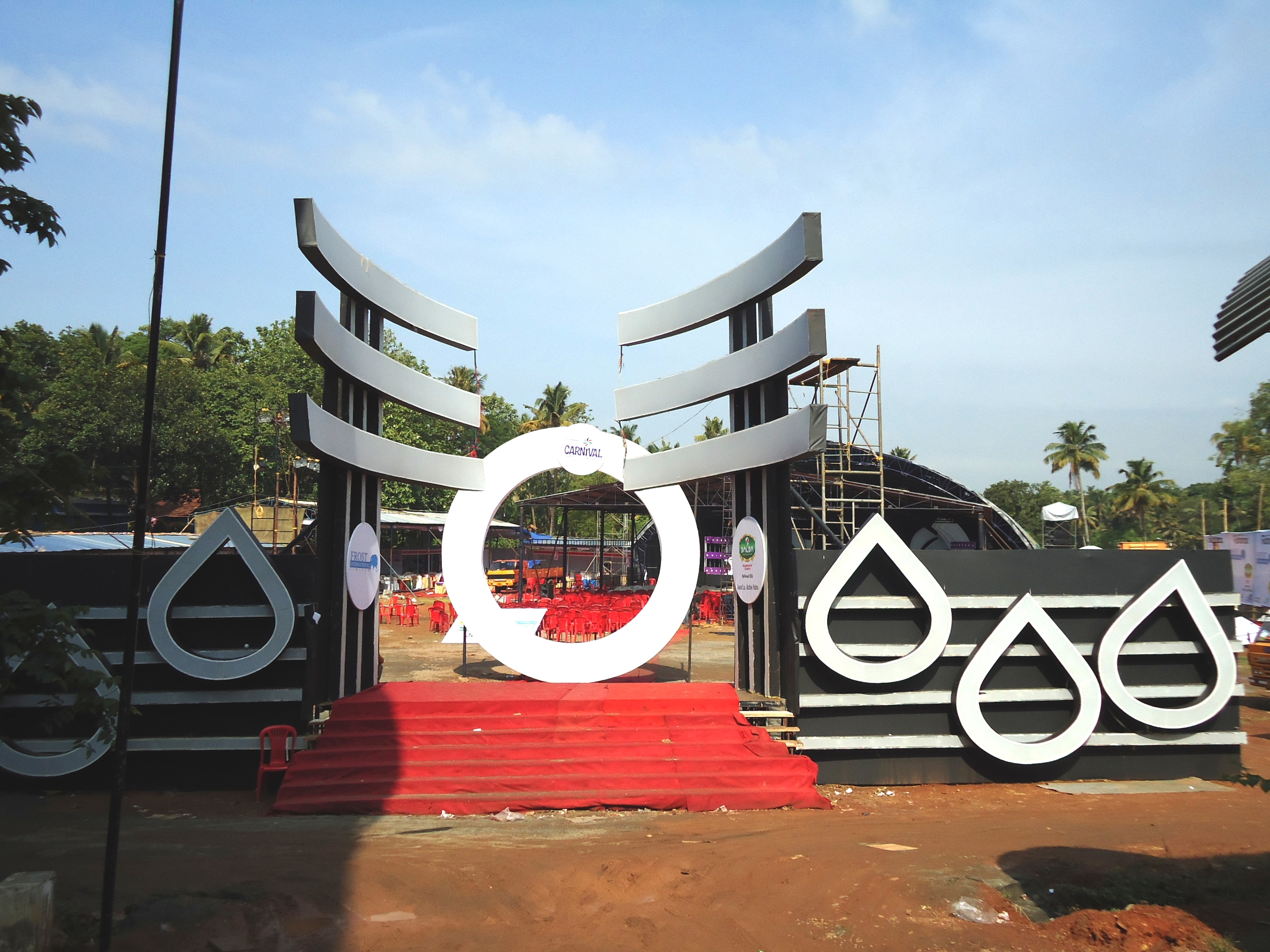
Angamaly Carnival 2012

Angamaly railway station is the fifth-busiest in Greater Kochi in terms of passengers and revenue generated, after Ernakulam Junction railway station, Ernakulam Town railway station, Aluva railway station and Tripunithura railway station. A proposed railway line from Sabarimala to Angamaly has been slowed by regional and political issues. The project was revitalized in January 2021 when the Government of Kerala agreed to bear half the cost of the project.

National Highway 544, which connects Kanyakumari to Salem, passes through Angamaly. NH 17, which connects Kochi and Mumbai, is 20 km from Angamaly. The Main Central Road that connects central Kerala to the state capital of Thiruvananthapuram terminates in Angamaly. A 46 km bypass connecting National Highway 66 and National Highway 544 has been proposed to connect Kundannoor to Angamaly. Land acquisition was set to begin in late 2018.

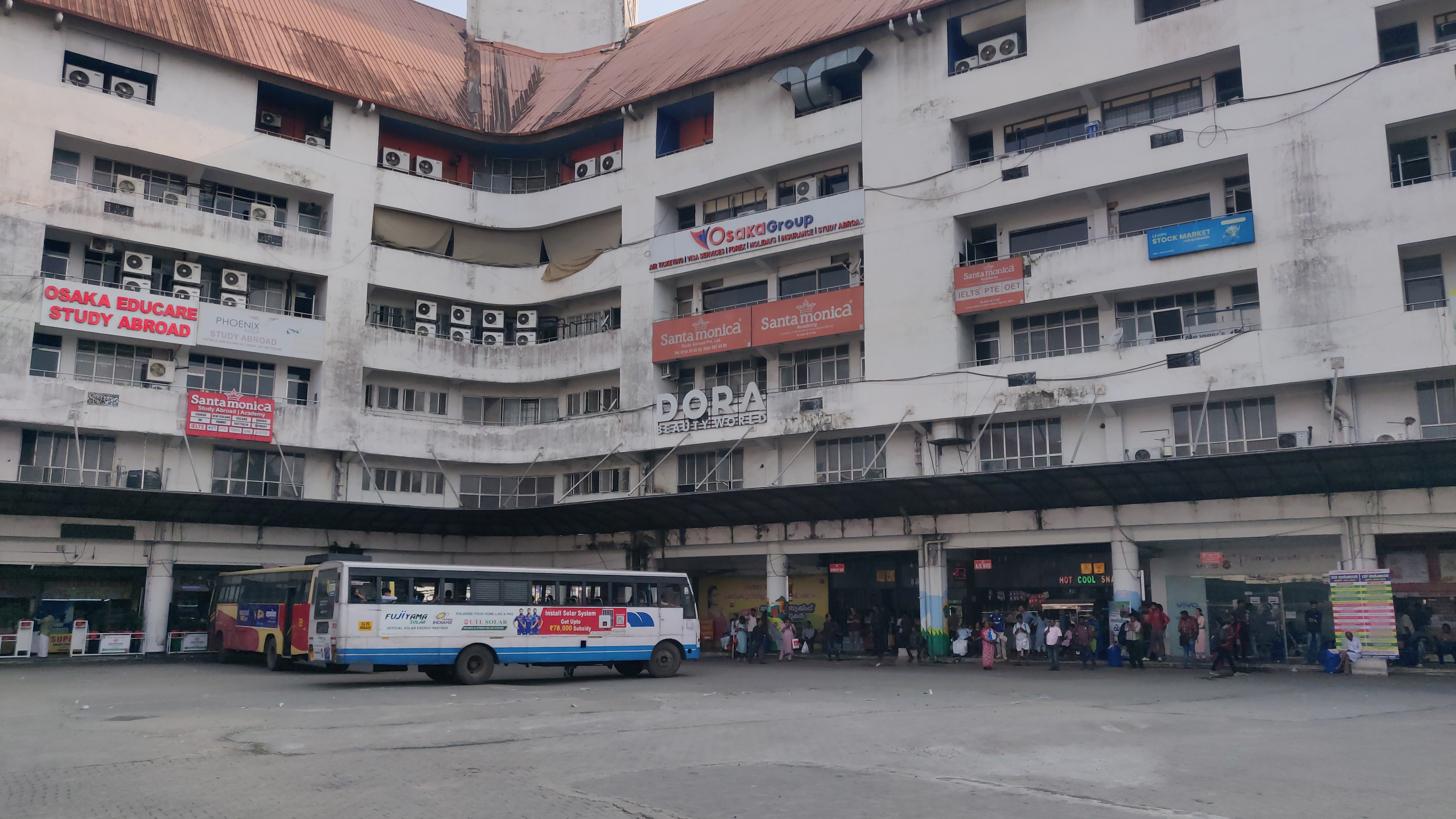
Angamaly KSRTC Bus Station Building with bus

== Places of interest ==
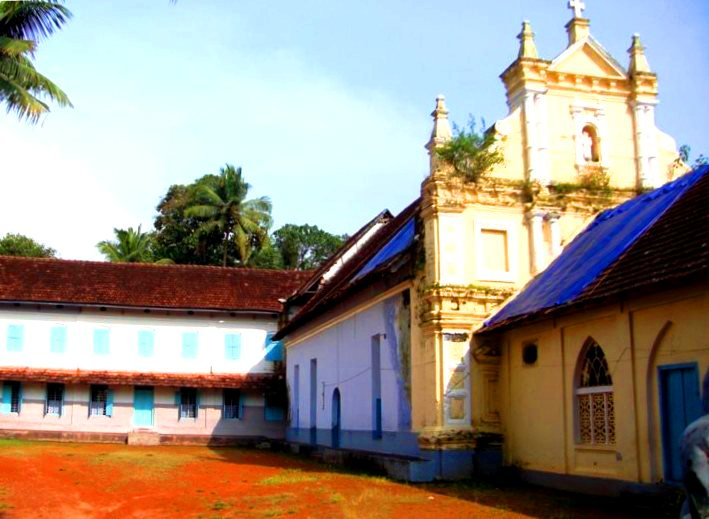
Mar Hormizd Syro-Malabar Cathedral

- Mar Hormizd Cathedral – established in 1570 by Mar Abraham, the last East Syriac bishop of the See of Angamaly; it was dedicated to Hormizd, a seventh-century East Syriac saint
- St. George Syro-Malabar Catholic Basilica – minor basilica and the biggest of its kind in southern India
- St. Thomas Syro-Malabar Catholic Church, Malayattoor – international shrine
- St. Mary's Jacobite Soonoro Cathedral – ancient church and one of the most prominent Jacobite churches in Kerala
- Thiru Nayathode Siva Narayana Temple – Hindu temple built by Cheraman Perumal Nayanar in 800 AD
- Kallil Temple – Jain shrine established in the 9th century
- Transformers and Electricals Kerala Limited – electrical manufacturing company

== Demographic figures ==
General	Population	33,465
Sex	Male	49%
Sex	Female	51%
Age	< 6	9%
Religion	Christian	71.89%
Religion	Hindu	27.03%
Religion	Muslim	0.83%
Education	Literacy rate	96.47%

Angamaly Is Home To The Archeparchy of Ernakulam–Angamaly,Which Serves As The Center Of Syro-Malabar Church Throughout Kerala.

== Gallery ==
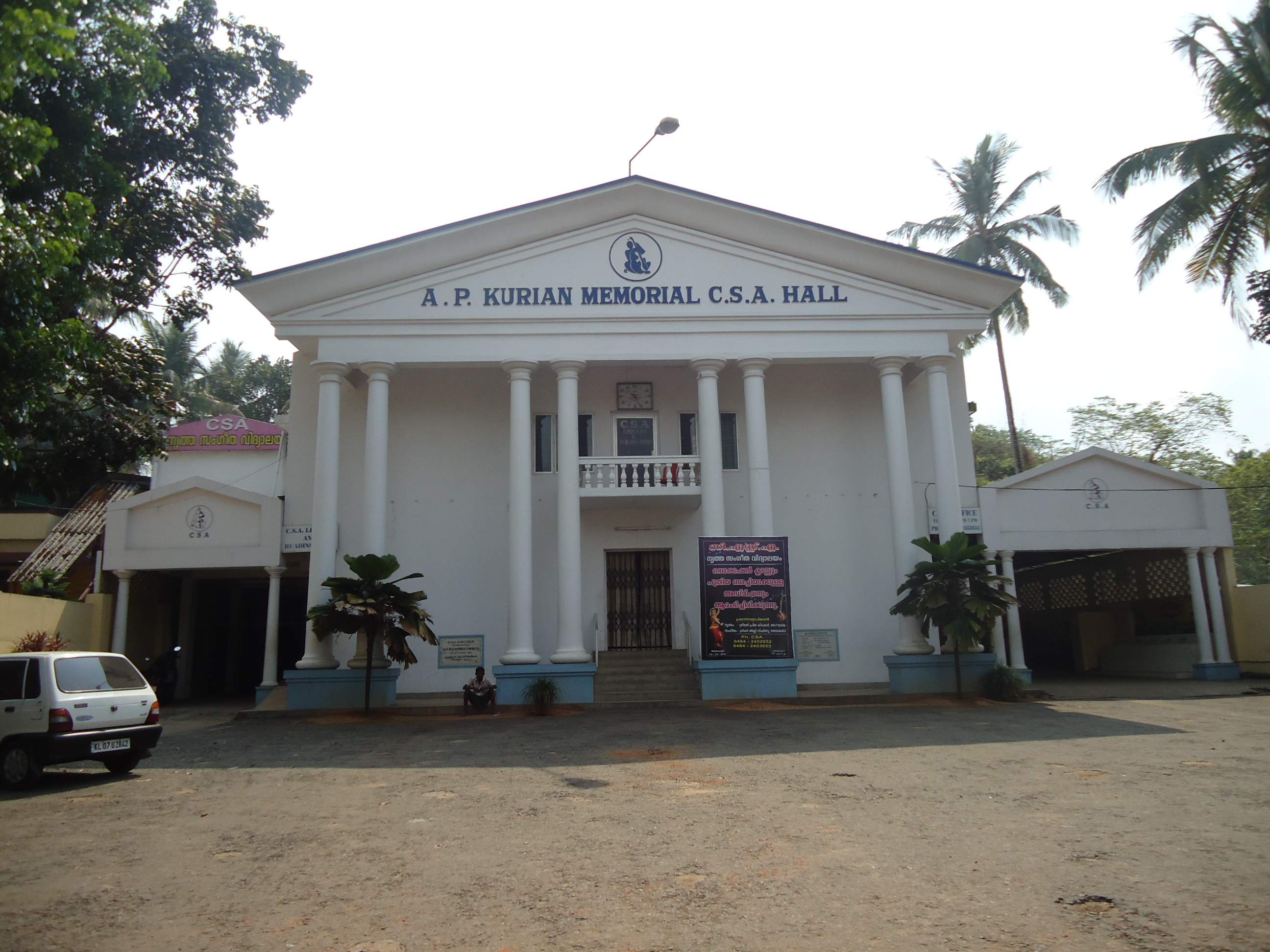
CSA Hall

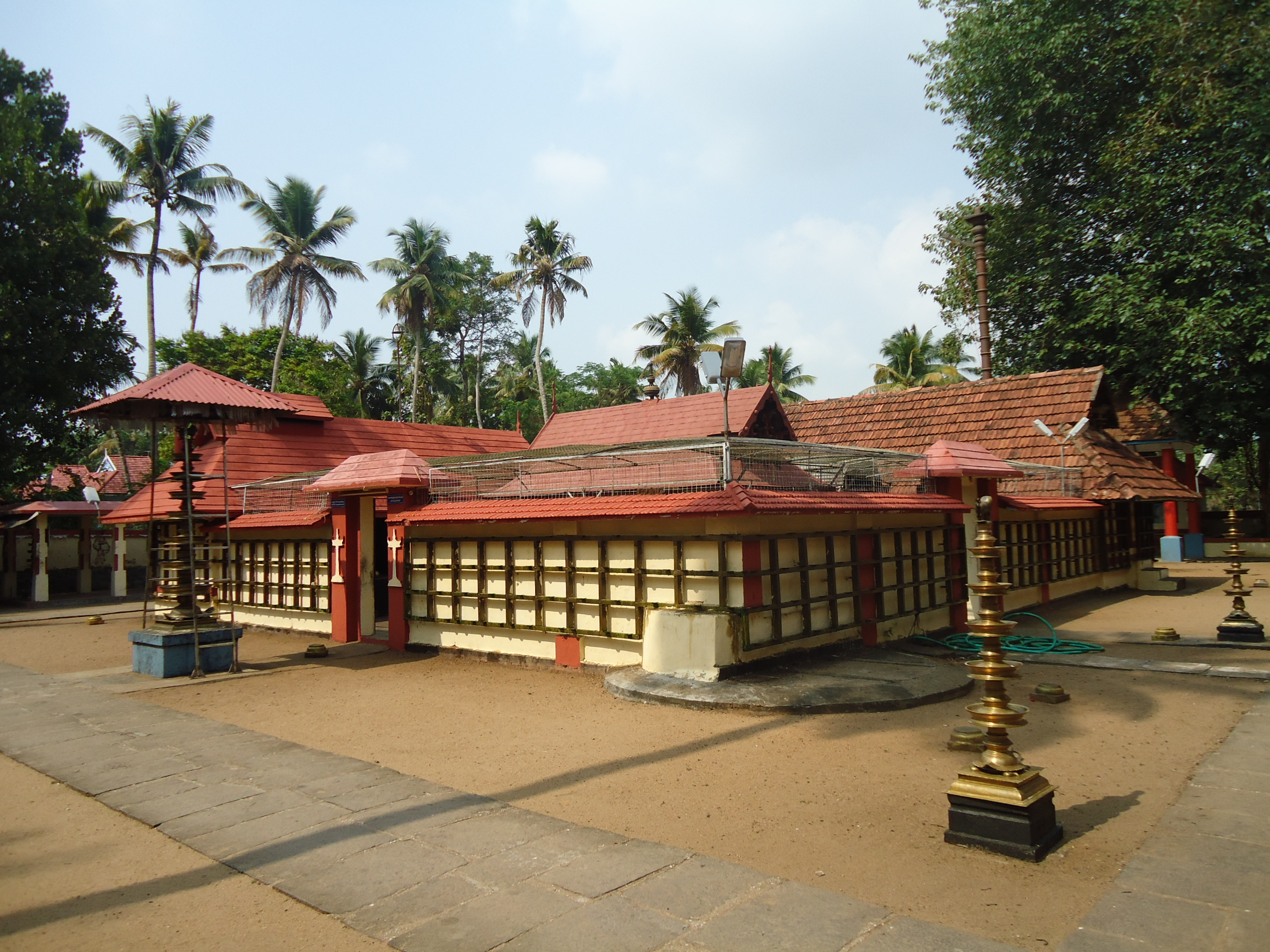
Kothakulangara Baghavathy temple

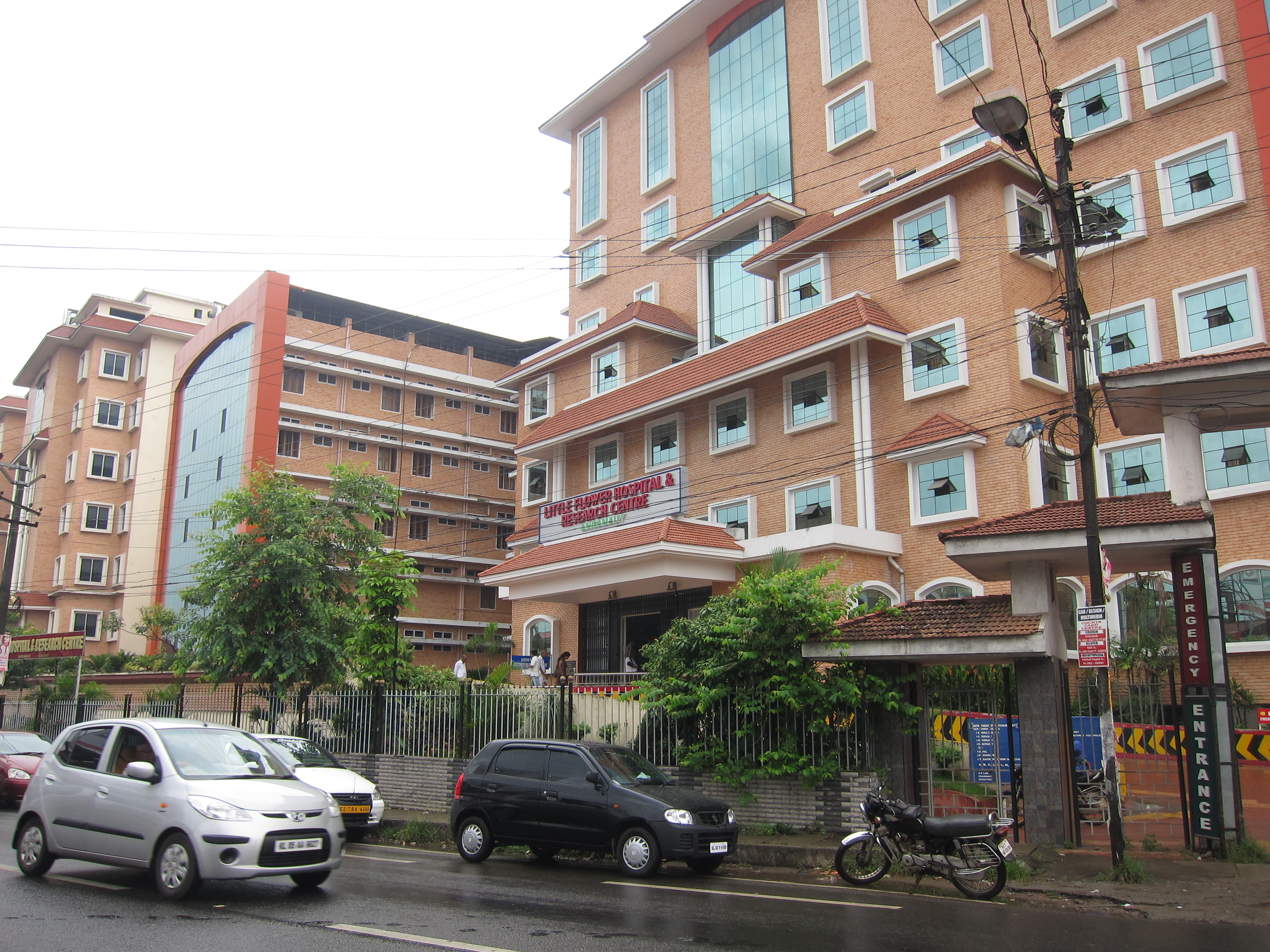
Little Flower Hospital

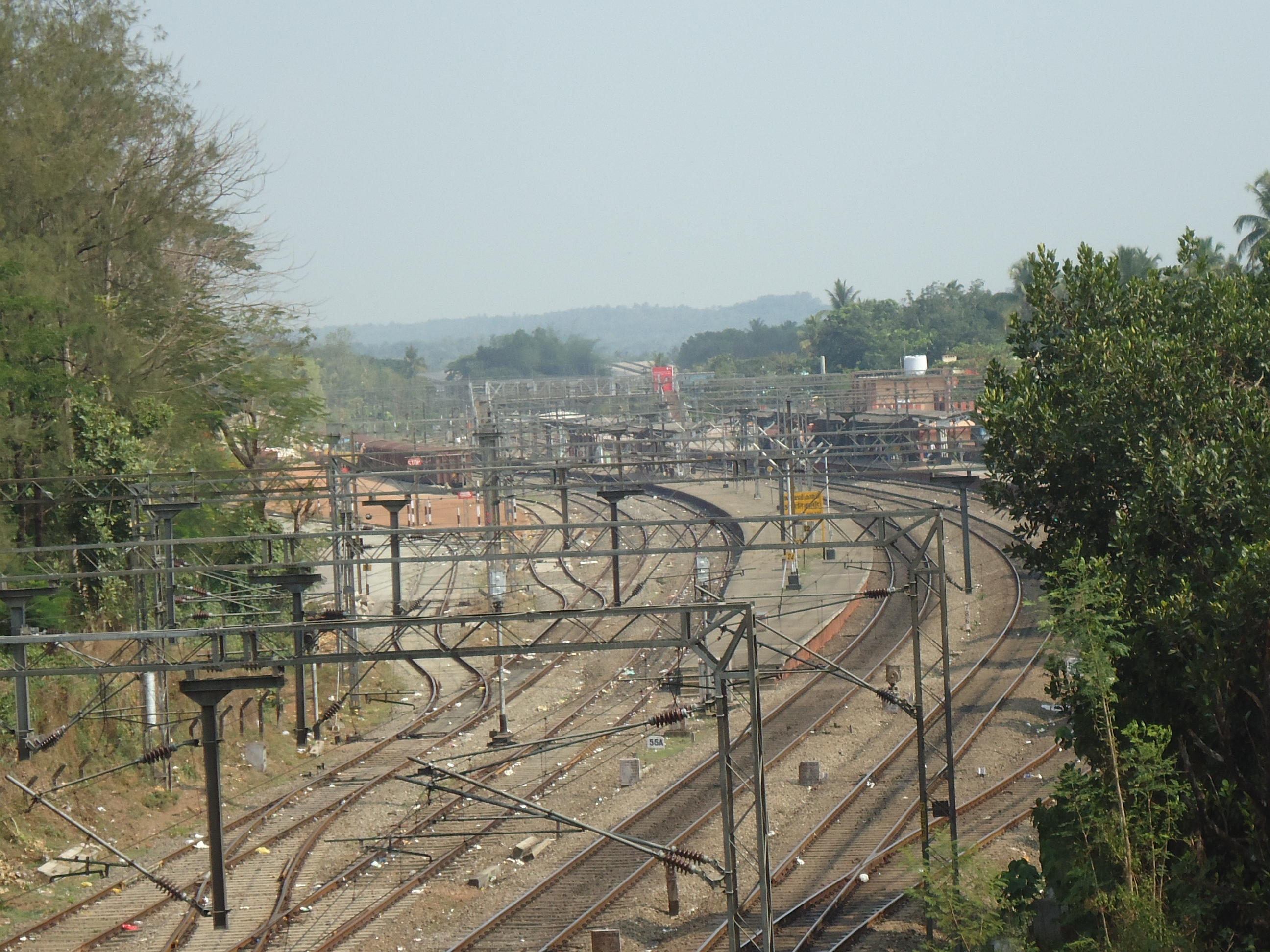
Angamaly railway station

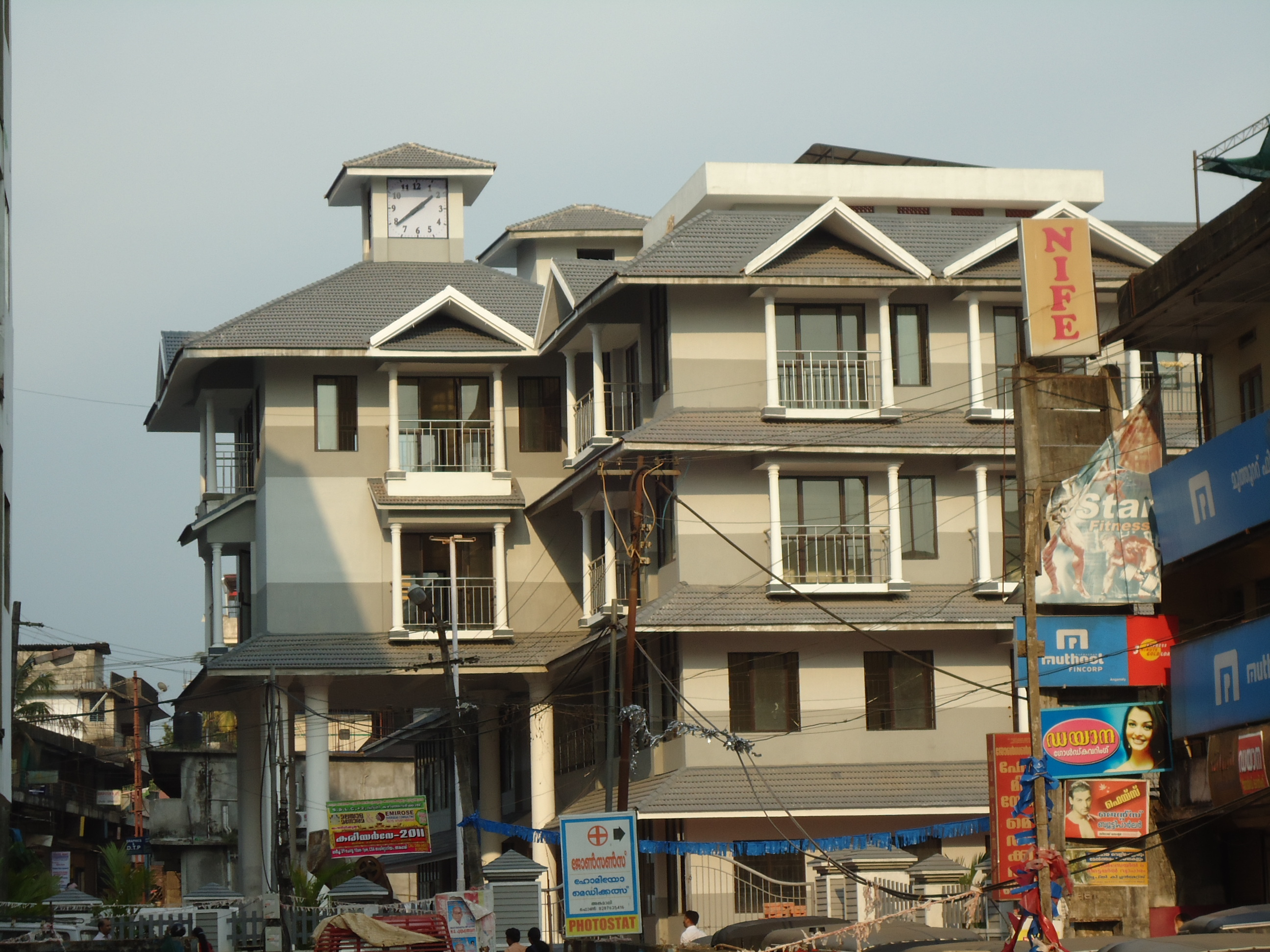
Angamaly municipal office

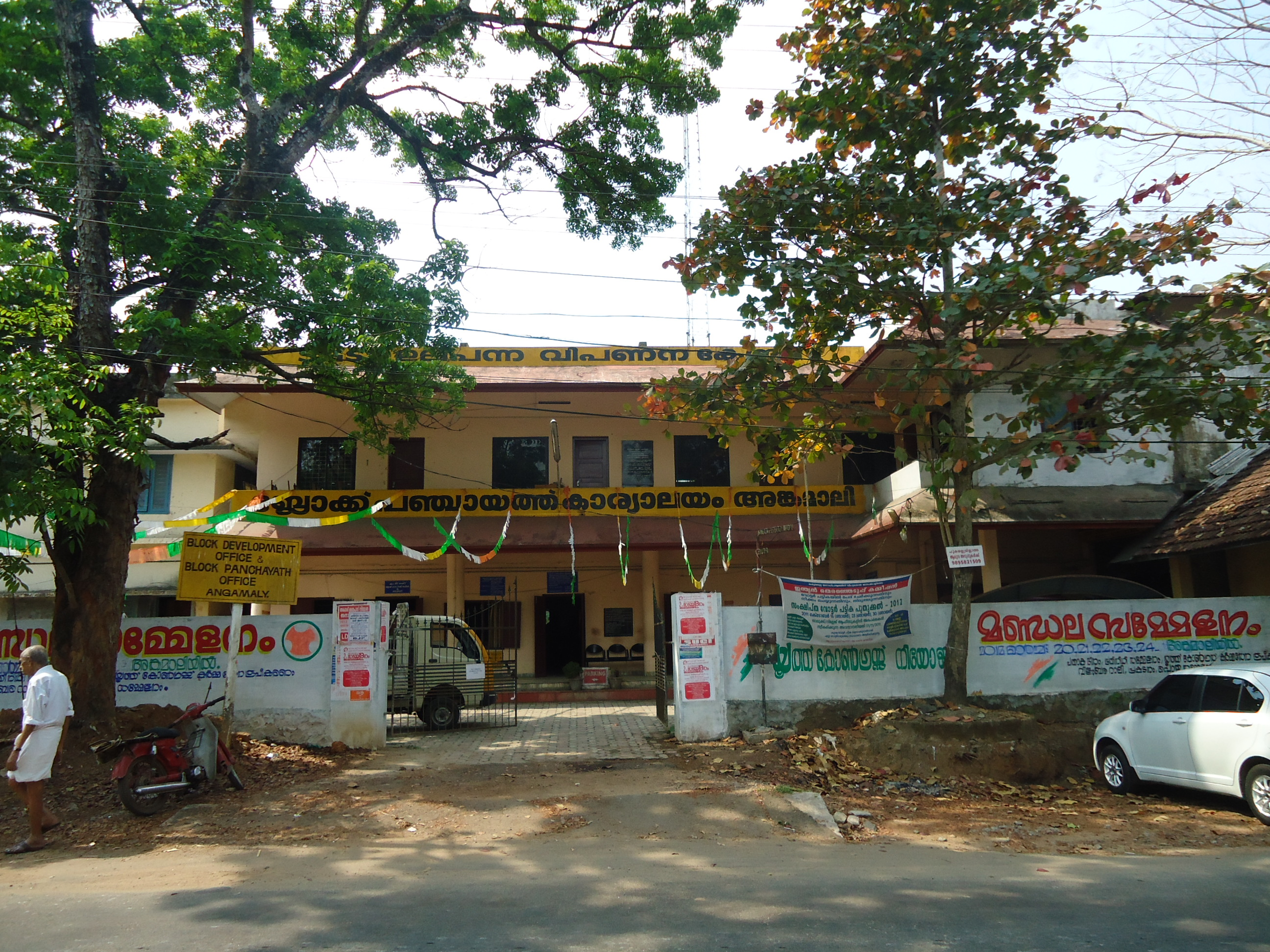
Block Panchayat office

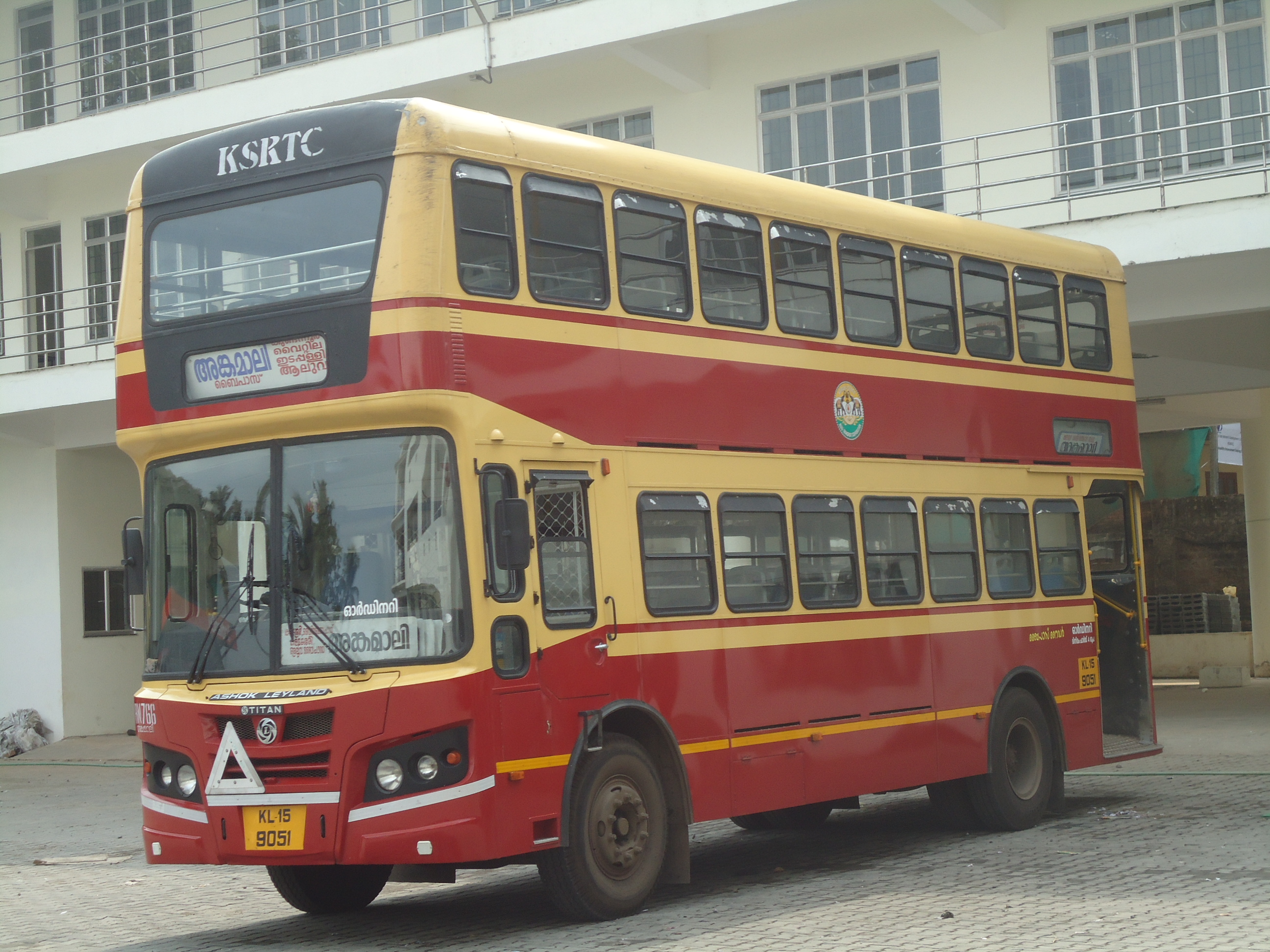
Double-decker bus

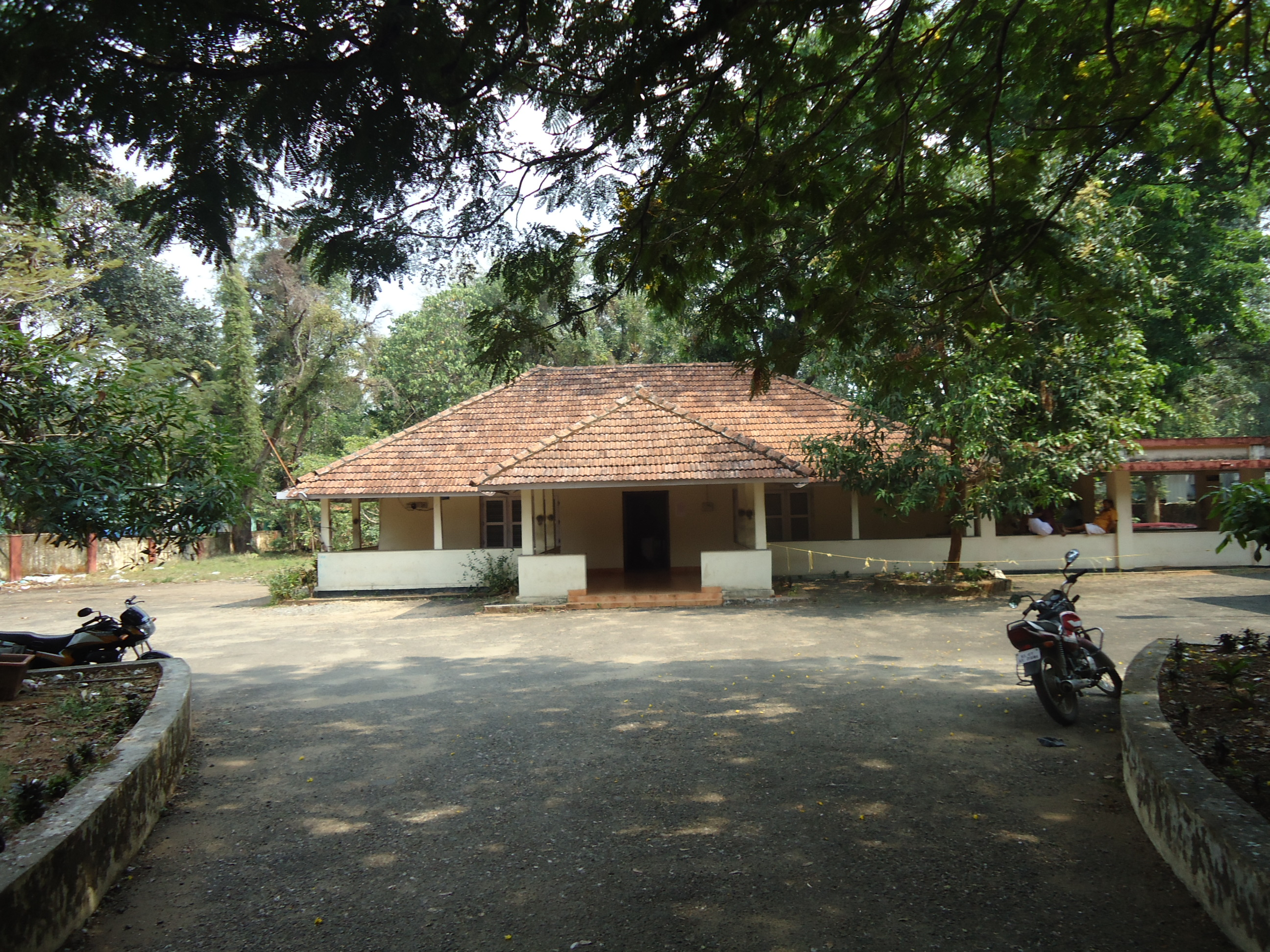
PWD rest house

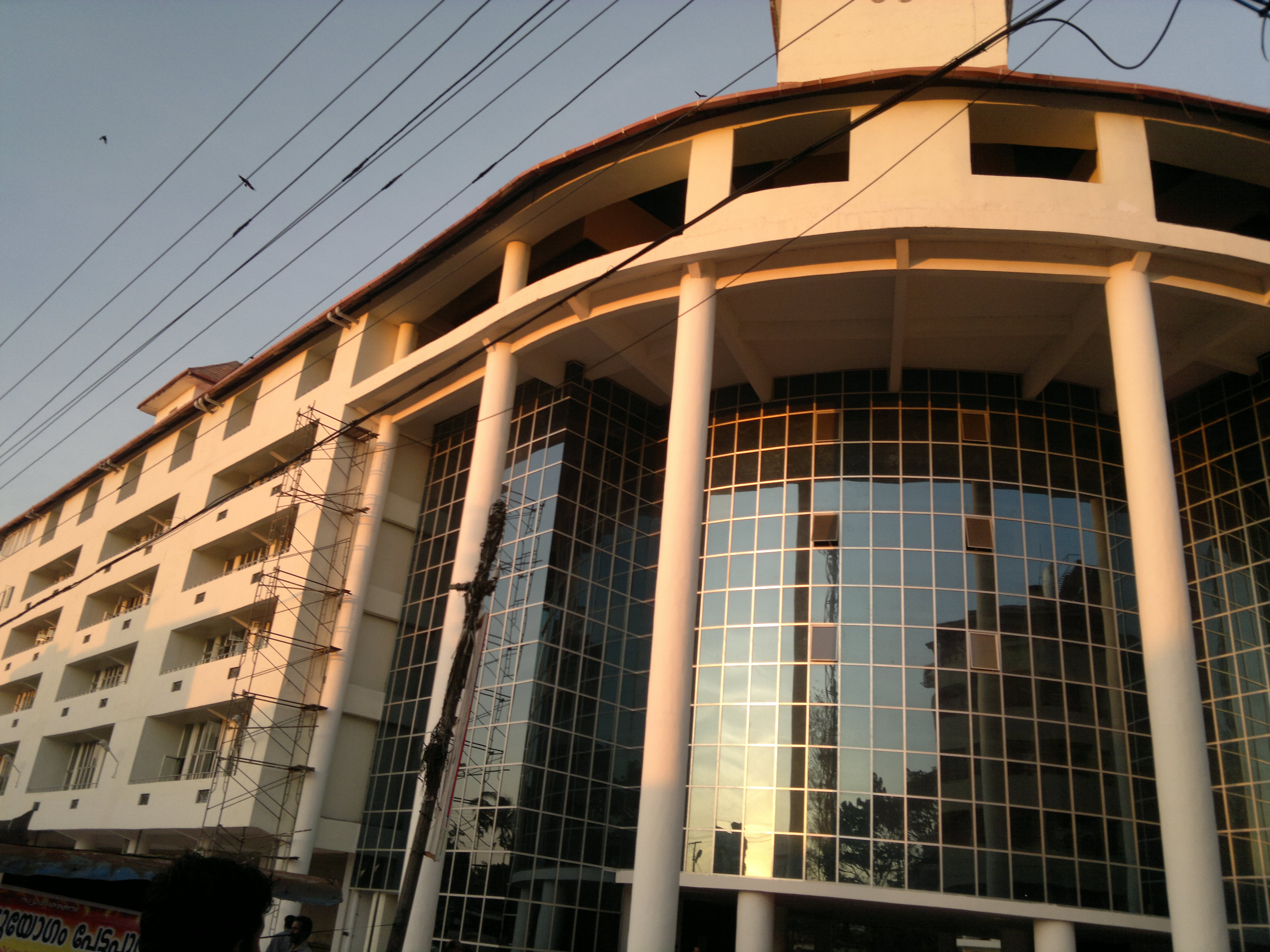
Angamaly KSRTC bus station

== See also ==
- Kunnappillissery
- Thekke Kidangoor
