= Kerala Tourism Infrastructure Limited =

Government undertaking in Indian state

- Company type: Kerala Government Undertaking
- Industry: Tourism, Ecotourism
- Founded: 16 August 1989
- Headquarters: Thiruvananthapuram, Kerala, India
- Area served: Kerala, India
- Key people: P. A. Mohammed Riyas - Minister for Tourism; Sajeesh S K – Chairman; Board of Directors: Dr. Manoj Kumar K – Managing Director; Biju K IAS – Secretary (Tourism); Keshvendra Kumar IAS – Secretary (Finance Expenditure); Sikha Surendran IAS – Tourism Director
- Owner: Tourism Department, Government of Kerala
- Website: Official website

Kerala Tourism Infrastructure Ltd or (KTIL), formerly Tourist Resorts (Kerala) Limited, is a Government of Kerala undertaking under Kerala Tourism Department, established in August 1989 to promote tourism investment and to develop Tourism infrastructure in the Indian state of Kerala. KTIL was conceived to identify tourism infrastructure needs of the state and bridge any identified gaps. Kerala is today growing at an amazing pace in tourism, adhering to the principles of indigenousness, environmental sustainability and community participation. Kerala's beaches, hill stations, backwaters, wildlife sanctuaries, historical monuments, etc. attract foreign as well as domestic tourists.

The growth in Tourism Industry has also created an infrastructure gap in various tourism amenities, resulting in a disparity in supply and demand. KTIL is working towards creating various investment, development and partnership models to address this issue and to catalyse growth.

== Administration ==
KTIL was separated from KTDC in 1989, as an independent company. A 1005 government owned enterprise, the company is managed by Managing Director, who reports to Chairman. The Government Secretary to Tourism Department, is the ex-officio Chairman of KTIL. The current Chairman is Sri. Sajeesh S K and Managing Director is Dr Manoj Kumar K. There are 3 nominated directors in the Board of Directors. The Government Secretary of Finance, Director of Kerala Tourism and Managing Director of KTDC are other members in the board.

== KTIL Activities ==
The range of activities conducted by KTIL can be broadly divided into three.

=== Joint Venture Partnerships ===
The primary function of the company is to develop public-private partnership (PPP model) projects for tourism infrastructure development. Taj Kerala Hotels and Resorts is a joint venture between KTIL and Taj Hotels Resorts and Palaces under the PPP model. KTIL announced its latest PPP model project, an urban entertainment centre at Veli, Thiruvananthapuram. This particular project will contribute significantly to the tourism development of the capital city and Kerala as a whole.

=== PPP Venture ===
KTIL envisages developing tourism based projects on PPP Model, utilizing idle land owned by the Government in locations having tourism potential. One of the first project, identified is development of Veli Urban Entertainment Center with an amusement park, recreational hub and cultural museum.

In addition, KTIL have already partnered with Kerala Tourism for constructing mega International Convention Center at Akkulam in Thiruvananthapuram, along with Mumbai-based Raheja Group.

Apart from it, KTIL is planning to start similar International Convention Center facility in Kochi in PPP Model.

=== RE - NRK partnership ===
KTIL developed an initiative wherein a platform for interaction between resident entrepreneurs(RE) and non-resident Keralites (NRK's) were developed to promote investment in the sector.

=== Government projects ===
KTIL worked as implementing agency for government projects like Sarovaram Bio Park, Thalassery Heritage Tourism Circuit Development, and the Thali Project.

- Sarovaram Bio Park is an eco-tourism initiative by Government of Kerala. The bio park which was earlier known as dream city is located a Kozhikode district of Kerala. The project is executed after taking into consideration the environmental aspects. The park is located in an ecosystem consisting of Canoly Canal, wet lands, mangrove, bird habitat etc.
- Thalaserry Circuit, consisting of an Overburrys folly with View tower, walkway etc., a sea-view park, a pathway connecting Overburrys folly and sea-view children's park and a municipal park with recreation and cafes, located near Thalassery Fort, a prominent tourist location.
- Thali Temple Conservation Project, Kozhikode is one of the ancient Siva Temples in Kerala dating back to the days of the Zamorin's rule. The temple with its well balanced combination of wood and laterate in construction is considered one of the icons of the cultural heritage of Kerala, especially the Malabar region.

This project envisages conservation of this historic structure and its surroundings. It includes renovation of the temple pond, Altharas and surroundings.

=== SAPARYA ===
Synergizing Actions through Participatory Approach, abbreviated as SAPARYA is the latest offering of KTIL in developing community based tourist projects, in which larger community invest together with KTIL in developing ecological sustainable community initiatives. The pilot project will be implemented in four districts: Kasaragod (Bekal, Valiyaparamba region), Kannur (Meenkunnu Beach, Thalassery region), Kottayam (Kumarakom, Aimanam region) and Pathanamthitta (Aranmula, Konni region). Gradually the project would be extended to other parts of the State. The project would address issues such as unregulated development, inadequate local benefits, social perception among common people towards tourism, degeneration of culture and heritage and increasing environmental impact. It would create tourism linkages and augment potential for various sectors like agriculture, fisheries, traditional industry, people and lifestyle and heritage. Touted as the first of its kind, this project aims in developing local economy and exposing to outside people without disturbing local environment and local customs and heritages.

== See also ==
- Tourism in Kerala
- Tourism Department
