= Public sector undertakings in Kerala =

State-owned enterprises in Kerala, India

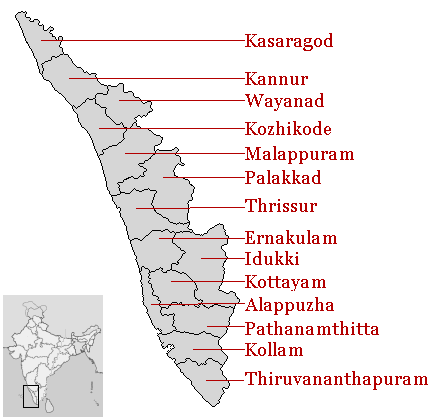
Districts of Kerala

Public sector undertakings in Kerala are of two types, public sector units in which majority shares are owned by Union Government and public sector units in which majority shares are owned by State Government. Public sector undertakings in Kerala, i.e. enterprises in which majority shareholder is Government of Kerala are generally divided into Manufacturing & Non-Manufacturing. Some of the PSUs such as Kinfra, KSIDC, SIDCO etc. are promotional agencies. As of 2004 there were 104 enterprises spread over 14 different sectors of Kerala economy. These sectors are as varied as engineering, electronics to wood products & welfare agencies. Eleven units are joint venture of Kerala government with the central government. Most of state PSUs units are under Department of Industries & Commerce (85 enterprises).

The largest enterprises (Based on 2005 figures)

Rank	Based on capital investment	Based on turnover	Based on profitability	Based on employment	
1	Kerala State Electricity Board	Kerala State Electricity Board	Kerala State Electricity Board	Kerala State Road Transport Corporation	Kerala State Road Transport Corporation
2	Kerala Water Authority	Kerala State Beverages Corporation.	Kerala State Financial Enterprises Ltd.	The Kerala State Cashew Development Corporation Limited	Kerala Water Authority.
3	Kerala State Housing Board	Kerala State Road Transport Corporation.	Kerala Minerals and Metals Ltd.	Kerala State Housing Board	Kerala State Civil Supplies Corporation Limited

In 2002, it was reported that Kerala government have chosen to either restructure or close the loss-making enterprises and has no plan for privatisation. As per CAG report for 2008-2009, Kerala PSUs lack accountability, and needs improvement for imbibing professionalism and efficiency. It showed an incurred loss of ₹589 crore. Losses in PSUs were attributed to poor financial management, planning, implementation of projects, running of operations and monitoring. In 2012–13, out of the 78 PSUs which had finalised their accounts during that fiscal year, 45 PSUs earned a total profit of ₹666.86 crore and 31 PSUs incurred loss of ₹607.34 crore, as per CAG report. Kerala State Beverages Corporation was the most profit making PSU, while the Kerala State Electricity Board incurred an operational loss of ₹3,758.17 crore.

In a 2016 study, Kochi-based think tank Centre for Public Policy and Research stated that Kerala government should take a cue from the disinvestment process initiated at the Centre and initiate it at the State level, as Kerala has the case of large number of PSUs in the state that were closed, as they were not able to withstand the competition in the market. During the fiscal year 2016-2017, PSUs in Kerala incurred a net loss of ₹80.67 crore. According to Kerala's state industrial department, the PSUs had a combined net profit of ₹106.91 crore in 2017-2018; there were total 42 PSUs. In 2018–19, 17 PSUs had registered operational profit, according to the state industrial department. For the fiscal year 2020-21, the annual review report by the Bureau of Public Enterprises calculated a total net loss of ₹6,055.47 crore from public enterprises in the state. Among these, 63 enterprises were loss-making, while 50 managed to make a profit. Top 10 loss-making enterprises together contributed to 95.39 percent of the total losses. KSRTC topped with a loss of ₹1,976.03 crore which was 30.08% of the total loss, KSEB came second with a loss of ₹1,822.35 crore, representing 27.74% of the total loss, and Kerala State Beverages Corporation came third with a loss of ₹1,608.17 crore, accounting 24.48 percent of total loss.

== List of state PSUs in Kerala ==
Sl. No	Company	HQ Location	Sector	Remarks
1	Astral Watches Limited, Kowdiar	Thiruvananthapuram	Engineering	Defunct
2	Autokast Limited	Cherthala	Engineering	
3	Bekal Resorts Development Corporation Ltd.,	Thiruvananthapuram	Tourism	
4	Foam Mattings (India) Limited	Alappuzha	Traditional industry	
5	Forest Industries (Travancore) Limited,	Kochi	Wood based industry	
6	Handicrafts Development Corporation of Kerala Ltd	Thiruvananthapuram	Traditional industry	
7	InfoPark, Kochi	Kochi	Information Technology	
8	Kerala Agro Industries Corporation Limited	Thiruvananthapuram	Agro based	
9	Kerala Agro Machinery Corporation Ltd.,	Kochi	Engineering	
10	Kerala Artisans' Development Corporation Ltd.,	Thiruvananthapuram	Welfare	
11	Kerala Automobiles Limited	Thiruvananthapuram	Engineering	
12	The Kerala Ceramics Limited	Kundara	Ceramics & Refractories	
13	Kerala Clays and Ceramic Products Limited	Kannur	Ceramics & Refractories	
14	Kerala Construction Components Limited	Cherthala	Ceramics & Refractories	Closed down
15	Kerala Electrical and Allied Engineering Company Ltd.	Kochi	Electrical equipment	
16	Kerala Feeds Limited	Thrissur	Cattle Feed	
17	Kerala Garments Limited	Kannur	Textiles	Closed down
18	Kerala Hitech Industries Limited	Thiruvananthapuram	Engineering	
19	Kerala Industrial Infrastructure Development Corporation (KINFRA)	Thiruvananthapuram	Developmental & Infrastructure	
20	Kerala Khadi & Village Industries Board	Thiruvananthapuram	Traditional industry	
21	Kerala Land Development Corporation Limited	Thiruvananthapuram	Developmental & Infrastructure	
22	Kerala Medical Services, Corporation	Thiruvananthapuram		
23	Kerala Minerals and Metals Ltd.	Kollam	Chemical industries	
24	Kerala Police Housing and Construction Corporation Limited	Thiruvananthapuram	Developmental & Infrastructure	
25	Kerala Premo Pipe Factory	Chavara		Unit closed down
26	Kerala Shipping & Inland Navigation Corporation Ltd.	Kochi	Public utilities	
27	Kerala Small Industries Development Corporation Ltd., (SIDCO)	Thiruvananthapuram	Developmental & Infrastructure	
28	Kerala Soaps & Oils Ltd. (Not to be confused with Kerala Soaps Unit)	Kozhikode	Chemical industries	Liquidated
29	Kerala Solvent Extractions Ltd	Thrissur	Agro based	
30	The Kerala State Bamboo Corporation Ltd	Thiruvananthapuram	Agro based	
31	Kerala State Beverages Corporation.	Thiruvananthapuram	Trading unit	
32	Kerala State Cashew Development Corporation Ltd.	Kollam	Agro based	
33	Kerala State Civil Supplies Corporation Ltd.	Kochi	Trading unit	
34	Kerala State Coconut Development Corporation Ltd.	Attingal	Agro based	Under liquidation
35	Kerala State Coir Corporation Ltd.	Alappuzha	Agro based	
36	Kerala State Construction Corporation Ltd.	Kochi	Engineering	
37	Kerala State Co-operative Federation for Fisheries Development Ltd., Matsyafed	Thiruvananthapuram	Fisheries	
38	Kerala State Detergents and Chemicals Ltd.	Kuttipuram	Chemical industries	Closed down
39	Kerala State Cooperative Textile Federation Ltd.	Thiruvananthapuram	Textile	
40	Kerala State Development Corporation for Christian Converts from Scheduled Castes and the Recommended Communities	Kottayam	Financing, Marketing, Education	
41	Kerala State Development Corporation for Scheduled Castes and Scheduled Tribes Ltd.	Thrissur	Welfare	
42	Kerala State Drugs and Pharmaceuticals Limited	Alappuzha	Chemical industries	
43	Kerala State Electricity Board	Thiruvananthapuram	Public utilities	
44	Kerala State Electronics Development Corporation Ltd., (KELTRON),	Thiruvananthapuram	Electronics	
45	Kerala State Film Development Corporation Ltd.	Thiruvananthapuram	Developmental & Infrastructure	
46	Kerala State Financial Enterprises Ltd.	Thrissur	Developmental & Infrastructure	
47	Kerala State Handicapped Persons Welfare Corporation Ltd.	Thiruvananthapuram	Welfare	
48	Kerala State Handloom Development Corporation Ltd.	Kannur	Traditional industries	
49	Kerala State Horticultural Products Development Corporation Ltd., (Horticrop)	Thiruvananthapuram	Agro based	
50	Kerala State Housing Board	Thiruvananthapuram	Public utilities	
51	Kerala State Industrial Development Corporation Ltd.	Thiruvananthapuram	Development & Infrastructure	
52	Kerala State Industrial Enterprises Ltd	Thiruvananthapuram	Development & Infrastructure	
53	Kerala State Industrial Products Trading Corporation Ltd.	Thiruvananthapuram	Trading units	
54	Kerala State Maritime Development Corporation Ltd.	Kochi	Public utilities	
55	Kerala State Poultry Development Corporation Ltd.	Thiruvananthapuram	Agro based	
56	Kerala State Palmyrah Products Development and Workers Welfare Corporation Ltd., (KELPAM)	Thiruvananthapuram	Welfare	
57	Kerala State Road Transport Corporation	Thiruvananthapuram	Public utilities	
58	Kerala State Rural Women's Electronics Industrial Co-operative Federation Ltd-RUTRONIX	Thiruvananthapuram	Electronic /IT Training	
59	Kerala State Salicylates & Chemicals Ltd.	Thiruvananthapuram	Chemical industries	Closed down
60	Kerala State Textile Corporation Ltd.	Thiruvananthapuram	Textiles	
61	Kerala State Warehousing Corporation	Kochi	Agro based	
62	Kerala State Women's Development Corporation Ltd.	Thiruvananthapuram	Welfare	
63	Kerala State Wood Industries Ltd.	Malappuram	Wood based industry	
64	Kerala Tourism Development Corporation Ltd.	Thiruvananthapuram	Tourism	
65	Kerala Urban and Rural Development Finance Corporation Ltd.	Thiruvananthapuram	Development & Infrastructure	
66	Kerala Water Authority	Thiruvananthapuram	Public utilities	
67	LBS Institute of Technology for Women	Thiruvananthapuram	Engineering Education	
68	Malabar Cements Limited	Palakkad	Chemical industries	
69	Malabar Co-operative Textiles Ltd. (MALCOTEX)	Malappuram	Textiles	
70	Meat Products of India Ltd.	Kochi	Agro based	
71	Oil Palm India Ltd.	Kottayam	Agro based	
72	Overseas Development and Employment Promotion Consultants Ltd.	Thiruvananthapuram	Labour & Rehabilitation	
73	Rehabilitation Plantations Ltd	Punalur	Labour & Rehabilitation	
74	Roads and Bridges Development Corporation of Kerala Ltd.	Kochi	Public works	
75	Scooters Kerala Ltd.	Alappuzha	Engineering	Closed down
76	Sideco Mohan Kerala Ltd.	Thrissur		Unit closed down
77	Sidkel Televisions Ltd.	Thiruvananthapuram	electronics	Unit closed down
78	Sitaram Spinning and Weaving Mills	Thrissur	Textiles	
79	State Farming Corporation of Kerala Ltd.	Punalur	Agro	
80	State Rural Development Board	Thiruvananthapuram	Development & Infrastructure	Unit closed down
81	Steel Complex Ltd.	Kozhikode	Engineering	
82	Steel and Industrial Forgings Ltd	Thrissur	Engineering	
83	Technopark, Trivandrum	Thiruvananthapuram	Development & Infrastructure, Information Technology	
84	The Metal Industries Ltd.	Palakkad	Engineering	
85	The Metropolitan Engineering Company Ltd.	Thiruvananthapuram	Electrical equipment	Unit closed
86	The Pharmaceutical Corporation (IM) Kerala Ltd., (Oushadhi)	Thrissur	Chemical industries	
87	The Plantation Corporation of Kerala Ltd.	Kottayam	Agro based	
88	The Priyadarshini Co-operative Spinning Mills Ltd.	Kottayam	Textiles	
89	Tourist Resorts (Kerala) Ltd.	Thiruvananthapuram	Tourism	
90	Traco Cable Company Ltd.	Kochi	Electrical equipment	
91	Transformers and Electricals Kerala Limited	Kochi	Electrical equipment	Joint Venture with NTPC Ltd (44.6%)
92	Tranvancore Cochin Chemicals Ltd.	Kochi	Chemical industries	
93	Travancore Cements Ltd.	Nattakom Kottayam	Chemical industries	
94	Travancore Plywood Industries Ltd.	Punalur	Wood based industry	Closed down
95	Travancore Sugars & Chemicals Ltd.	Thiruvalla	Chemical industries	
96	Travancore Titanium Products Ltd.	Thiruvananthapuram	Chemical industries	
97	Trivandrum Rubber Works Ltd.	Thiruvananthapuram	Agro based	Liquidated
98	Trivandrum Spinning Mills Ltd.	Thiruvananthapuram	Textiles	Closed down
99	Tourist ResortsLtd.	Thiruvananthapuram	Infrastructure & Development	
100	United Electrical Industries Ltd.	Kollam	Electrical equipment	.
101	The Trichur Co-operative Spinning Mills Ltd	Thrissur	Textiles	
102	Kerala Financial Corporation	Thiruvananthapuram	Finance	

== List of state PSUs in Kerala under joint ownership with Central Government ==
Sl. No	Company	HQ Location	Sector	Remarks
1	Handicrafts Development Corporation of Kerala Limited	Thiruvananthapuram	Traditional industry	
2	Kerala Agro Industries Corporation Limited	Thiruvananthapuram	Agro based	
3	Kerala Forest Development Corporation Limited	Kottayam	Agro based	
4	Kerala Khadi & Village Industries Board	Thiruvananthapuram	Traditional industry	
5	Kerala State Road Transport Corporation	Thiruvananthapuram	Public utilities	
6	Kerala State Warehousing Corporation	Kochi	Agro based	
7	Kerala State Women's Development Corporation Limited.	Thiruvananthapuram	Welfare	
8	Kerala State Wood Industries Ltd.	Malappuram	Wood based industry	
9	Oil Palm India Ltd.	Kottayam	Agro based	
10	Rehabilitation Plantations Limited	Punalur	Labour & Rehabilitation	
11	Kerala Land Development Corporation Limited	Thiruvananthapuram	Developmental & Infrastructure	
12	Kochi Metro Rail Limited	Kochi	Metro rail	

== See also ==
- List of departments and agencies of the Government of Kerala
- List of Central government establishments in Kerala
