= Hindustan Newsprint =

Indian public sector papermaking company

Hindustan Newsprint Ltd. (HNL) was a government company in the Indian Central Public Sector. HNL was incorporated under the Companies Act, 1956, on 7 June 1983, in Kottayam district, Kerala. HNL is a former fully owned subsidiary of Hindustan Paper Corporation Limited (HPC) which is fully owned by Government of India. It is now a public sector undertaking under Government of Kerala. It was renamed as Kerala Paper Products Limited (KPPL) in 2021.

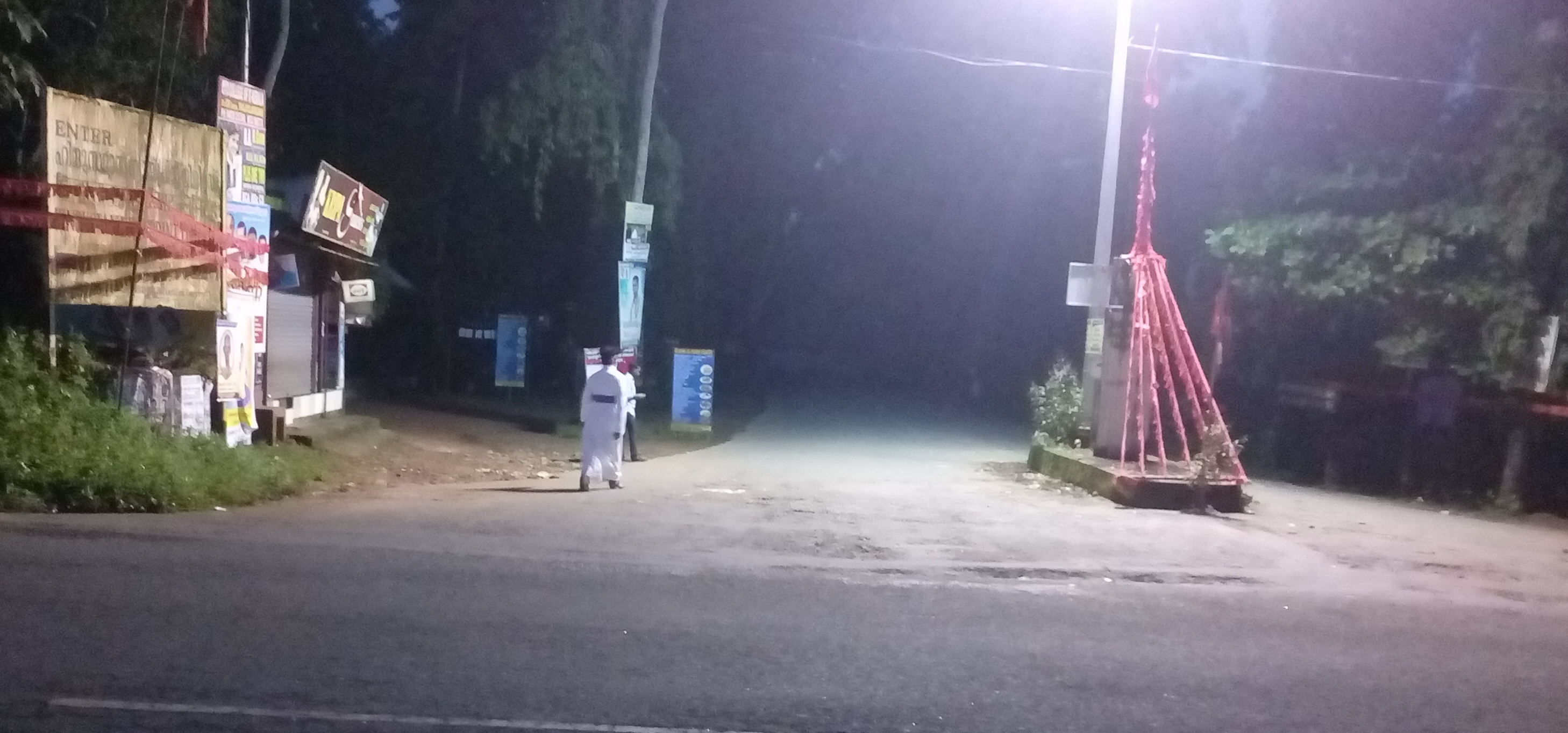
Entrance Road Of Hindustan Newsprint Limited, Kottayam

== Origin of HNL as Kerala News print Project ==
This Project was conceived, as early as, 1968 when the first Feasibility Report was prepared and on the basis of that Report the Government of India took a decision in May, 1970 to approve this Project in principle and desired that the HPC or HNL, on being established, should prepare a Detailed Project Report for approval of Government.

== Agreement between Government of Kerala and HPC ==
The Government of Kerala, in pursuance of its policy of industrial development of the State, readily expressed its willingness to promote and encourage the establishment of the Newsprint Factory Project in kerala and granted various concessions, rights, privileges and benefits to HPC as incorporated in the agreement dated 7 October 1974 between the Government of Kerala and HPC. The concessions, rights, benefits, etc. included among other things, adequate and sustained supply of various forest raw materials to the Newsprint Project from the State Government's forest resources.

== Incorporation of KNP as HNL ==
In 1983, the year in which the Kerala Newsprint Project commenced commercial operations, the Indian government, as a matter of policy, directed HPC, in public interest, to promote and incorporate as a government company under the Companies Act, 1956, to take over and operate the said Newsprint Mill and to acquire all the properties and assets as well as all the debts and liabilities belonging to the Newsprint Mill. Accordingly, HPC promoted and incorporated Hindustan Newsprint Limited (HNL) as its fully owned Subsidiary. On incorporation of HNL, transfer of assets and properties, etc. was concluded under a Tripartite Agreement dated 14 January 1985 among Hindustan Paper Corporation (HPC), HNL and the Indian government. Under this agreement, HNL is entitled to the benefits and it is liable to discharge the obligations, under all contracts, agreements, engagements, assurances, licenses and permits in relation to the said Kerala Newsprint Mill. Shri. K Gopalaswamy Ayyar assumed charge as its first managing director. Mr. Rama Krishna Pillay designed and commissioned the mill in 1983 and assumed charge as the works manager.

On 28 October 2017, the Government of India announced the privatization of Hindustan Newsprint.

== Revival of HNL as KPPL ==
In November 2019, National Company Law Tribunal approved a 146 crore bid of the Kerala government to acquire Hindustan Newsprint. It was renamed as Kerala Paper Products Limited (KPPL) in 2021.

== Sources ==
- Hindustan Newsprint Limited
