= Steel Industries Kerala Limited =

Steel manufacturing company in Kerala, India

Steel Industrials Kerala Limited
- Industry: Steel
- Founded: 1974
- Headquarters: Athani, Thrissur, Kerala, India
- Key people: Shri. T.G Ullas Kumar, Managing Director
- Subsidiaries: Steel and Industrial Forgings Ltd

Steel Industrials Kerala Limited (Steel Industrials Limited Kerala or SILK) is a state-owned steel manufacturing company in the state of Kerala, India. The company manufactures steel castings, does structural fabrications, building of small vessels and barges, breaking of ships and vessels. Steel and Industrial Forgings Ltd is a subsidiary of the company.
