= Trivandrum Rubber Works =

Indian manufacturing company

- Industry: Manufacturing
- Founded: 1963
- Headquarters: Thiruvananthapuram, India
- Products: Tread rubber, Cycle tyres, etc.
- Number of employees: 163 (As on 2005)

Trivandrum Rubber Works is a public sector manufacturing industry in Thiruvananthapuram, Kerala, India. Its manufactured products include, retreaded metals, bonding gum and unvulcanised sheets. It was promoted by Kerala State Industrial Development Corporation (KSIDC).

== History ==
The factory was opened by Sree Chithira Thirunal Balarama Varma, the then King of Travancore Kingdom, to manufacture rubber sheets for tents for the soldiers of the Second World War. It is located on 13.28 acres (53,700 m^{2}) of land at Chakkai, Thiruvananthapuram.

Trivandrum Rubber Works was the first factory to be set up in the public sector in Asia.
