= Kerala State Financial Enterprises =

Public-sector financial company in Thrissur, Kerala, India

Coordinates: 8°53′15″N 76°35′26″E

The Kerala State Financial Enterprises Limited
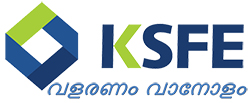

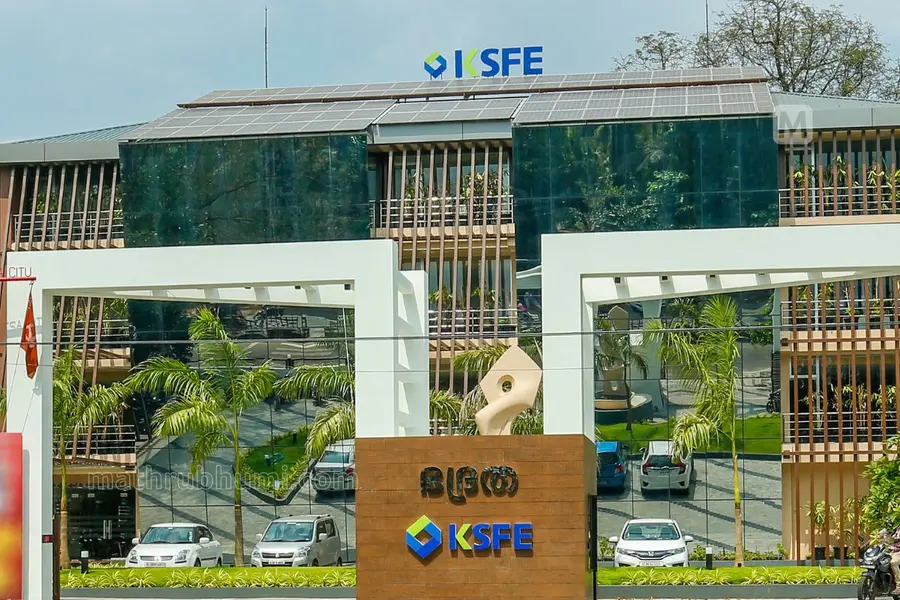
- KSFE Head Office in Thrissur, Keralam
- Type: Public Sector
- Industry: Chit Fund; Miscellaneous Non-Banking Financial Company
- Founded: November 6, 1969; 56 years ago
- Founder: Government of Keralam
- Number of locations: 680+, Digital Business Center, 16 Regional Offices
- Area served: Keralam
- Key people: K R Jyothilal IAS(Chairman); Abhilash P N (Managing Director); Dr.Sanil S K (General Manager, Risk & Compliance); Sreekumar P (General Manager, Business); Sarath Chandran S (General Manager, Finance)
- Products: Chits; Deposits; Loans & Advances; Safe Deposit Locker
- Revenue: ▲₹5,555.17 crore (US$580 million)(2024-25)
- Net income: ₹4,994.02 crore (US$520 million)(2024-25)
- Total equity: ₹1,584 crore (US$160 million)(2024-25)
- Owner: Government of Keralam
- Number of employees: 9000+
- Website: ksfe.com

The Kerala State Financial Enterprises Limited (KSFE Ltd) is a public sector Miscellaneous Non-Banking Financial Company owned by The Government of keralam. Its Head office named "BHADRATHA" is located in Thrissur, Kerala.

== History ==
The company started functioning on 6 November 1969, with Thrissur as its headquarters. It started with a capital of Rs 2 Lakh, and had 45 employees and 10 branches. As of 2025-26, it has 200 Cr paid up capital, 9000+ employees, 680+ branches & 16 regional offices located at Thiruvananthapuram Urban, Thiruvananthapuram Rural, Kollam Urban, Kollam Rural, Kottayam, Ernakulam Urban, Ernakulam Rural, Thrissur, Palakkad, Kozhikode Urban, Kozhikode Rural, Kannur, Alappuzha, Pathanamthitta, Kattappana and Malappuram and one Digital Business Centre at Thiruvananthapuram.Digital Business Centre conducts KSFE Pravasi chits for Keralites living outside Keralam.

KSFE is one of the two chit fund companies owned by the government in the whole of India. The other company is Mysore Sales International Limited (MSIL) owned by the government of Karnataka. KSFE's purpose at founding was to provide an alternative to unscrupulous private-sector chit fund organizers. In 2000, it had 77% of the capital volume of the chit fund business in Kerala, though just 37.5% of the number of chit funds.

== KSFE & Chitty ==
KSFE conducts chits under The Chit Funds Act 1982. Formerly it conducted chits based on The Kerala Chitties Act 1975. But after a landmark judgement by the Hon'ble Supreme Court of India in State Of Kerala & Others vs M/S. Mar Appraem Kuri Co.Ltd on 8 May, 2012, The Chit Funds Act 1982 was enacted in the state of Keralam and The Government of Keralam constituted The Kerala Chit Fund Rules 2012.

- Single Division Chitty

In regular chits one person can bid per month. The maximum auction discount is 30 percent. For example, in a chit of 1 lakh, up to Rs. 30,000 will be reduced. The auction discount received at the time of calling the chit will be shared with the other members of the chit. Chitti will have members with equal tenure. If it is a 50-month chit, there will be 50 people in the chit.

- Multi Division Chitty

Multi-division chits are chits that consist of multiple Regular chits. KSFE generally Multi Division Chitty had four divisions.400 people can join in 100 month tenure chitty. Every month four options to get the prize money. One prize draw and three auctions. Those who wins prize money through the coupon draw they get the amount after deduction of KSFE foreman commission and GST.

Multi-division chits with tenures of more than 100 months, maximum auction discount is 40%. For chits with a tenure of 60 months to 100 months, the chit maximum auction discount is 35%. Chittis with maturity of less than 60 months will get auction discount of up to 30%.

- KSFE Pravasi Chit

KSFE Pravasi Chitty is a financial savings scheme for Malayalees living outside Kerala. Through an online portal and a mobile application, investors can join chits, pay instalments, and participate in chit auctions. The scheme also enables non-resident Keralites to contribute to infrastructure projects in the State of Kerala.

- Fraternity Fund

In FY 2025-26 KSFE launched Fraternity Fund by rebranding the traditional Chit for Gen Z and Millennials. It also opened an office at Techno Park, Thiruvananthapuram.

- Pink Chits

In FY 2025-26 KSFE launched Pink Chits for women with cash backs in connection with Free bus tickets offered for women in buses operated by KSRTC known as Priyadarshini Bus service.

== Head office ==
The head office of KSFE Ltd , BHADRATHA is located in Thrissur, Keralam. In 10 November 2019 Chief Minister Sri.Pinarayi Vijayan inaugurated the new renovated corporate office during KSFE Golden Jubilee celebrations. The renovation process was completed by The Uralungal Labour Contract Co-operative Society (ULCCS). At that time Peelipose Thomas was the Chairman and A. Purushothaman was the Managing Director.

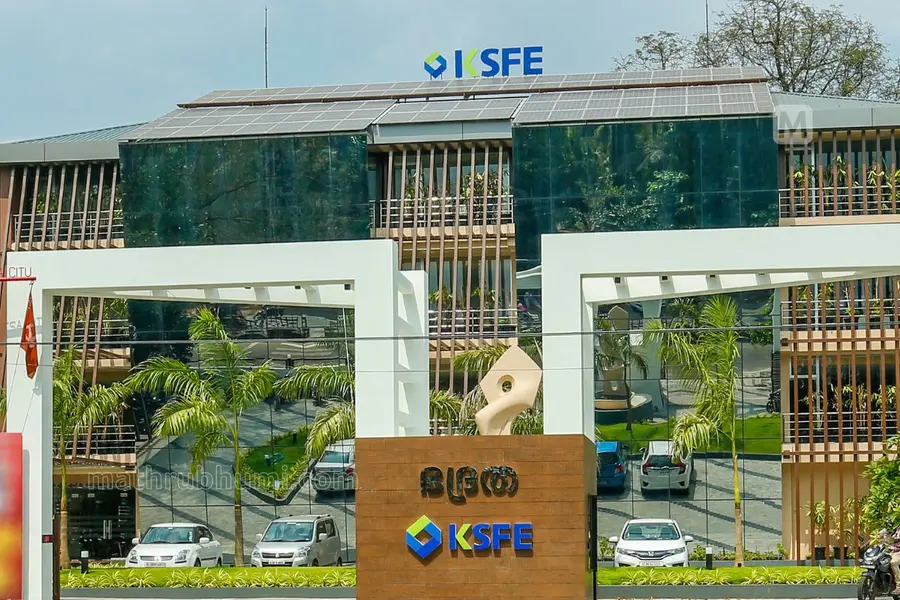
KSFE Corporate office located in Thrissur, Keralam.

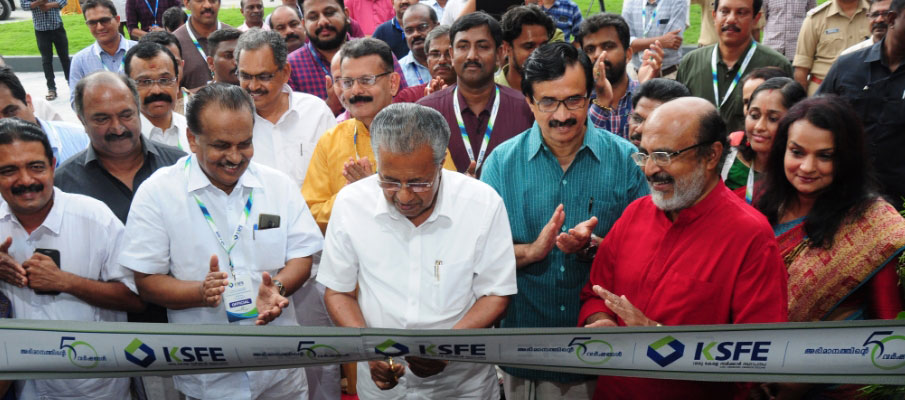
KSFE Corporate office inaguration

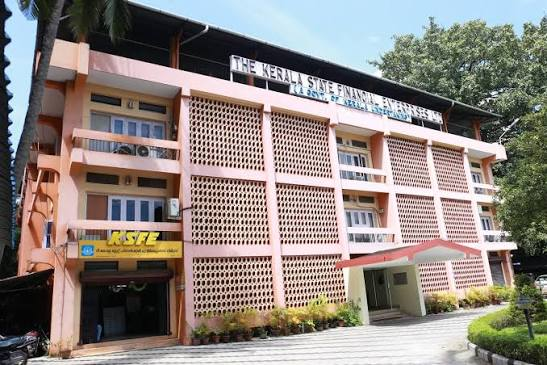
KSFE Corporate office before renovation located in Thrissur, Keralam.

== Human resource ==
Personnel recruitment for The Kerala State Financial Enterprises (KSFE) Ltd is officially institutionalized through the Kerala Public Service Commission (KPSC), ensuring compliance with the statutory guidelines and reservation norms governing public sector undertakings in the state. In FY 2024-25 KSFE Ltd made 1120 recruitments. At the end of FY 2024-25, The Kerala State Financial Enterprises Ltd maintained a workforce of 9,071 employees with a clear female-majority of 5370 vs 3701.

== Corporate Social Responsibility ==
The Corporate Social Responsibility (CSR) initiatives by the Kerala State Financial Enterprises Limited (KSFE) focus heavily on education, public healthcare infrastructure, sports development, and supporting marginalized communities. As a premier, state government-backed financial institution, KSFE executes its programs under a structured framework managed by a dedicated CSR committee in strict alignment with Section 135 of the Indian Companies Act, 2013.

- Educational Support & Digital Inclusion

A major share of KSFE’s CSR funding goes toward uplifting government and aided schools. This includes infrastructural makeovers, distributing smart devices, and building labs.

- Healthcare Infrastructure & Public Safety

KSFE regularly supports medical outreach and emergencies by donating critical transport infrastructure. They have provided dedicated medical emergency vehicles to vulnerable setups.

- Sports Infrastructure and Development

To nurture young athletes and promote a healthy lifestyle at the school level, the institution finances modern sporting surfaces.

- Social Welfare & Care for the Elderly

The enterprise also funds facilities that directly support marginalized or dependent populations across Kerala. A notable example is the procurement and handover of a dedicated passenger vehicle to the inmates of the Government Old Age Home at Kollam to meet their travel and recreational needs.

== 2024 Wayanad landslides ==
KSFE donated Rs 5 Cr to the CMDRF Keralam to help the victims & rebuilding process of 2024 Wayanad landslides.

== Milestone ==
In FY 2025-26 KSFE became the first MNBC in INDIA to achieve 1 Trillion (1 Lakh crore) business.This achievement was announced by Chief Minister Pinarayi Vijayan in a grand summit held at Thiruvananthapuram, the Capital of Keralam.

== Operating profit ==
Kerala State Financial Enterprises is the only public sector undertaking in Kerala that has operated at a profit since its inception in 1969. For the financial year 2024–25, its operating profit stands at ₹561.15 crore. In addition to paying dividends to the Government of Kerala, KSFE contributes to state revenue through the Goods and Services Tax (GST), guarantee commissions, and State Treasury deposits.

== Mission One Crore ==
"Mission One Crore" is the future initiative by KSFE to raise its current customer base from 60 Lakh to 1 Cr. It was also announced by Chief Minister Pinarayi Vijayan in the grand summit held at Thiruvananthapuram, the Capital of Keralam where he announced 1 Trillion achievement.

== Mobile application ==
In 2023 KSFE launched it's much avaited mobile appication named KSFE POWER. The subscribers of various KSFE products can manage their schemes through this mobile app, which is available in IOS , Android and Web platforms.

== Certification ==
The Kerala State Financial Enterprises Limited is an ISO 9001:2015 certified company.

== Awards and achievements ==
- Swadesh Samman Award (2025)

It was conferred at the 6th Swadesh Conclave at Bharat Mandapam in New Delhi. It recognized KSFE as the first MNBC in INDIA to achieve 1 Trillion (1 Lakh crore) business.

- Business World Emerging Business Awards (2026)

KSFE won Two Bronze awards for "Excellence in MSME Financing and Leadership in Financial Inclusion".
