= Kerala State Beverages Corporation =

Indian public sector company

Kerala State Beverages (M&M) Corporation Ltd. (BEVCO)
- Type: Kerala Public Sector Undertaking
- Industry: Wholesale and Retail trading in IMFL(Indian Made Foreign Liquor), Beer, FMFL(Foreign Made Foreign Liquor)
- Founded: 23.02.1984, delivery date (15.03.1984)
- Headquarters: BEVCO Tower, VikasBhavan P.O., Palayam, Thiruvananthapuram 695033, Thiruvananthapuram, Kerala
- Area served: Kerala
- Key people: Yogesh Gupta, IPS; Chairman & Managing Director
- Revenue: ₹19,088.68 crore (US$2.0 billion) (2023-24)
- Owner: Government of Kerala (100%)
- Number of employees: 5,263
- Website: bevco.in

Kerala State Beverages (Manufacturing & Marketing) Corporation Ltd (BEVCO) is a public sector company fully owned by the Government of Kerala, it started under Civil Supplies Department in 1984 under the Minister N Sreenivasan (Excise Minister), K Karunakaran Ministry. Since then BEVCO has the authority under the Abkari Act & allied Rules for the wholesale and retail vending of alcoholic liquor in Kerala. It controls the retail sales of Indian Made Foreign Liquor (IMFL) and Beer in the state.

== History ==
As per recommendation of a judicial commission, Kerala Government in 1984 amended the Abkari Act and set up a Public Sector Corporation to procure spirit and arrange blending, bottling, sealing and distribution of arrack and sale of IMFL throughout the State of Kerala.

Research by a Kochi-based think tank had suggested liberalization of India's liquor industry to facilitate entry of foreign players, considering the growth of sales in imported spirits across the country. According to think tank CPPR, the liquor market in India is the third largest and fastest growing one in the world. A significant part of this liquor demand is met by domestic production. However, the market operates under the strict regulatory framework of the government and this has led to corruption, cronyism, exorbitant prices, black-marketing and public health concerns, thereby affecting the liquor quality.

== Organisation ==
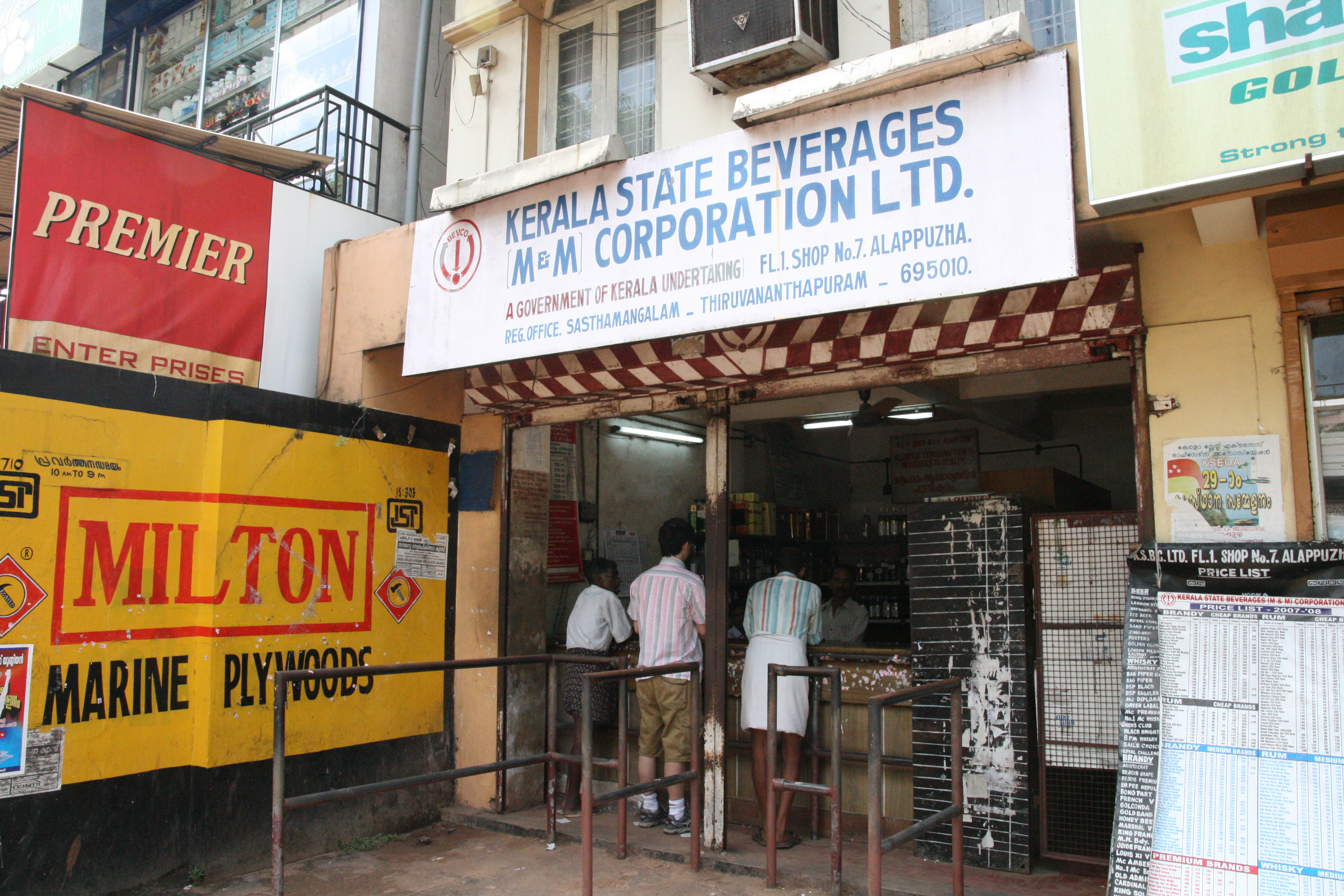
KSBC retail outlet in Alappuzha

KSBC is one of the most profitable public sector units in Kerala. The company is headed by a board with six members. The territory along with it sales and warehousing is divided into six regions by the corporation. Each region is headed by a Regional Manager. KSBC has had record sales during Onam, Christmas & New Year with Chalakudi reporting the highest sales and Badiadka being the second Incidentally Chalakudi records an average daily sale of Rs. 5-7 lakhs. Rum and brandy together account for 94% of KSBC sales in Kerala. Kerala is the largest consumer of rum in India.

=== Board of directors; ===
Office	Incumbent
Chairperson and Managing Director	Yogesh Gupta, IPS
Director	Seeram Sambasiva Rao, IAS (Excise Commissioner)
Director	P.B. Nooh, IAS (State GST Commissioner)
Director	Gopakumar.P (Addl. Secretary, Finance Dept. Govt. of Kerala)
Director	Pramod M.V. (Joint Secretary, Taxes Dept. Govt.of Kerala)

== Social impact ==
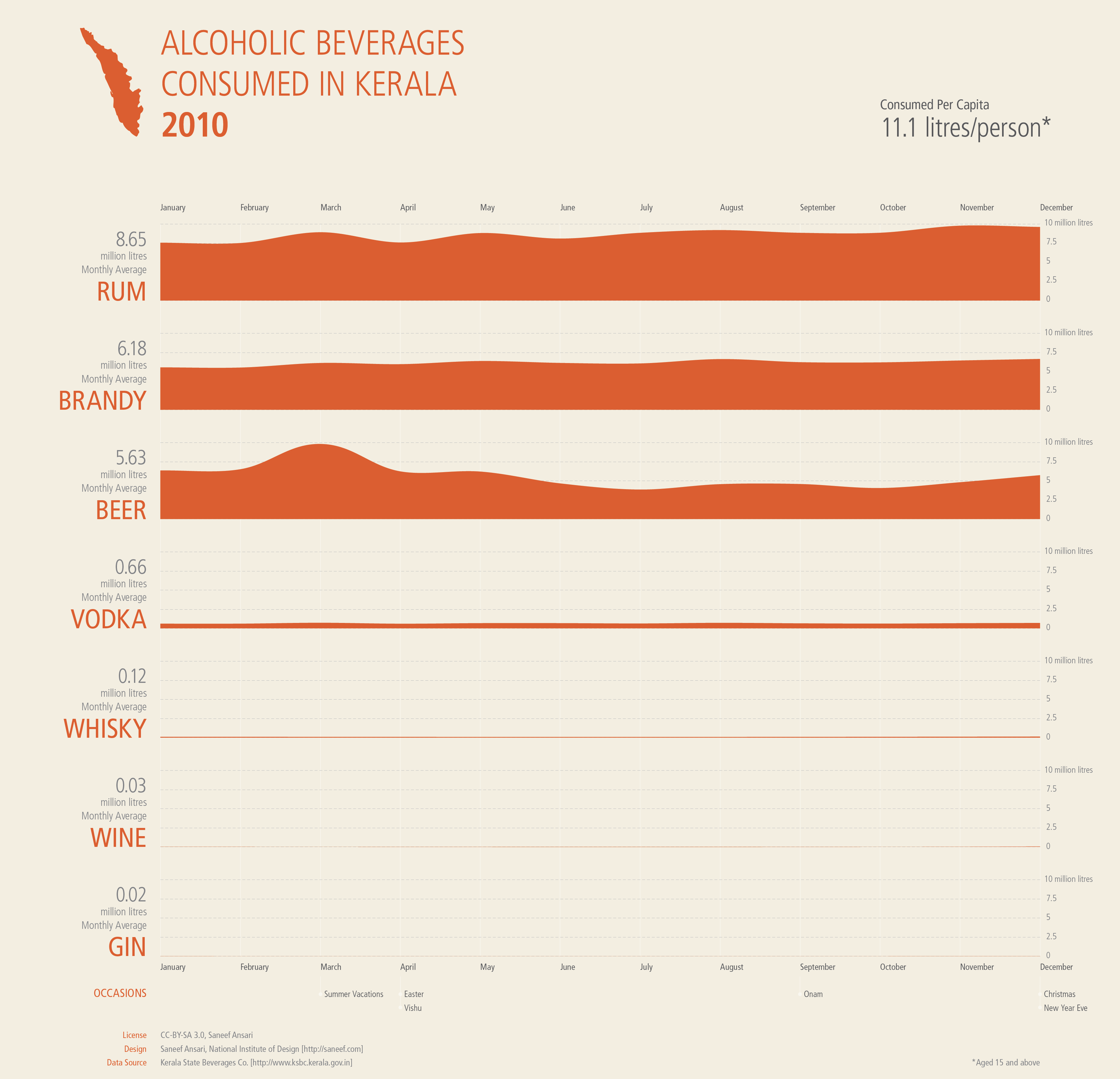
Consumption of alcoholic beverages in Kerala in 2010

With one of the highest per capita consumption of alcohol in India, alcohol-related problems are on the rise; even the President of India expressed deep concern over the rising demand for alcohol in Kerala.

== See also ==
- TASMAC
