= Malabar Cements Limited =

Indian cement company

Malabar Cements Ltd.
- Type: Public Sector
- Industry: Production and Sales
- Founded: 11 April 1978; 48 years ago in Walayar
- Headquarters: Walayar, Palakkad district, Kerala - 678 624, India
- Key people: T.K jose (Chairman); Sri. K. Harikumar(Managing Director)
- Products: Malabar Super, Malabar Aiswarya, Malabar Classic Cements, Malabar DryMix & Malabar Vega
- Total equity: 26crore
- Owner: Government of Kerala
- Website: www.malabarcements.com

Malabar Cements Limited is an Indian cement company. It is among the largest public sector cement production undertakings. It is fully owned by the Government of Kerala and is the only major integrated cement plant in the State. The total installed capacity of MCL is 6.2 lakh tons. This ISO 9001:2000 company is responsible for about 10% of total cement production in Kerala.

== History ==
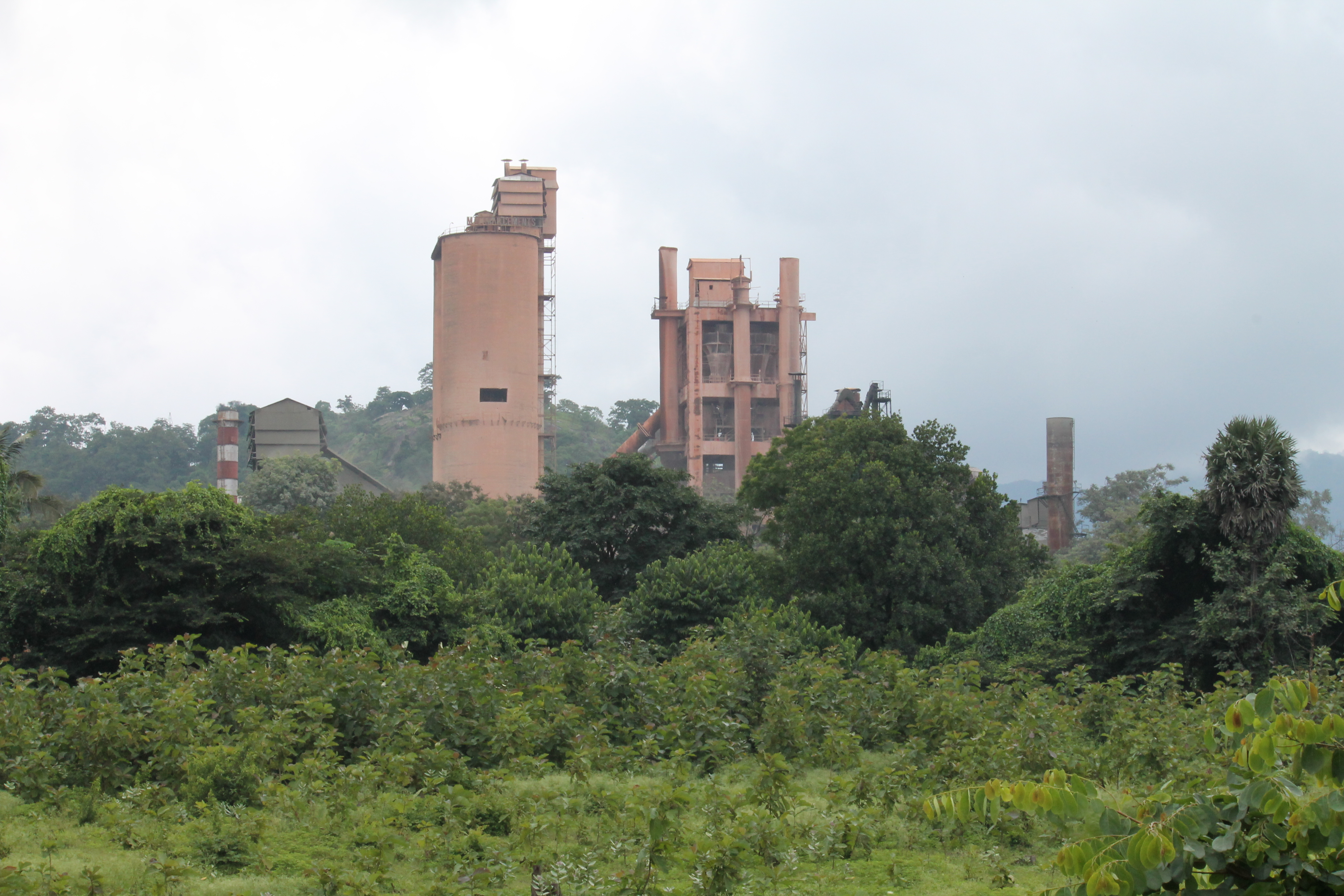
Palakkad Malabar Cement factory

The Geological Survey of India (GSI) had identified a cement grade limestone deposit in the Walayar reserve forest way back in 1961-62. Later, the Mineral Exploration Corporation Limited confirmed its efficacy. The limestone deposit was located in the Pandarethu valley of the Walayar region on the northern side of the Palakkad gap. Located in a dense forest, the hilly terrain required heavy investment. The state government was interested in building a cement factory. In 1975 a feasibility study was completed. In 1976 an industrial license for the manufacture of cement was obtained.

Despite its difficult terrain and perilous conditions at the deposit, the Kerala State Industrial Development Corporation (KSIDC) had engaged M/s. Holtec Engineers Pvt. Ltd., in 1975 to study the feasibility of putting up a cement plant at Walayar. And based on this study, KSIDC subsequently obtained an Industrial License for the manufacture of cement in November 1976. The Malabar Cements Limited thus came into existence at Walayar, the then remote and underdeveloped tiny village in the eastern boundary of the Palakkad District.

The company was incorporated on 11 April 1978 and commenced cement production at its Walayar plant in April 1984.

An expansion program added a 2.0 lakh ton clinker-grinding unit at Cherthala in Alappuzha district in August 2003.

A 2.5MW multi-fuel power plant for Walayar was commissioned in June 1998.

Development of the Cherthala plant began in August 2003 as part of an expansion plan by the company that included commissioning a 600 TPD Grinding Unit.

== Plant ==
The total installed capacity of MCL is 8.6 lakh tons.

=== Walayar plant ===
With a production capacity of 6.6 lakh tonnes of cement per annum, this unit is its largest one.

=== Cherthala plant ===
This plant includes a 600 tpd Grinding Unit. A two lakhs tonnes clinker grinding unit is there.
