= Kerala Electrical and Allied Engineering Company =

Kerala Electrical & Allied Engineering Co. Ltd.
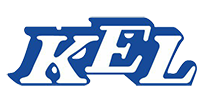
- Type: Public Sector
- Founded: 1964
- Headquarters: Kochi, India
- Key people: Shaji M. Varghese (Managing Director) P K Rajan Master (chairman)
- Products: Transformers, Fuses
- Net income: ₹34.19 crores (1st half 2017-2018)
- Website: https://kel.co.in

Kerala Electrical & Allied Engineering Co. Ltd., also known as KEL, is one among the largest productive public sector undertaking, fully owned company by the Government of Kerala. The company was founded in 1964 and is based in Kochi, India.

== History ==
The company started its first operation in 1964 by incorporating technology from the French firm EVR for the manufacturing of brushless Alternators, required for Indian Railways in lighting & air-conditioning of coaches. KEL owns five production units for the development of a number of equipment for Indian Army, Indian Air Force, Indian Space Research Organization and many other space research institutions.

== Divisions ==
KEL owns five divisions located in four districts of Kerala.

- Train Lighting Alternator Division Kundara Unit in Kollam District.
- Transformer Division Mamala Unit

and,

- Structural Division Mamala Unit in Ernakulam District.
- LT Switchgear Division Olavakkod Unit in Palakkad District.
- Cast Resin Transformer Division

Edarikode Unit in Malappuram District.

=== Train Lighting Alternator Division ===
This unit is in Kundara, Kollam district and is the first unit of KEL started in the year 1964, based on technical know-how acquired from EVR of France, for the purpose of manufacturing brushless alternators.

=== Transformer Division ===
The division established in 1969 at Mamala, about 15 km from Kochi. This unit was initiated with technical assistance from Bharat Heavy Electricals to manufacture distribution transformers. This unit is one of the first transformer industry in Kerala to obtain BIS certification for distribution transformers and first few in India to get ISO 9001 certification.

=== Structural Division ===
The Structural Engineering Division of KEL Mamala Unit, specializes in the design, fabrication and commissioning of hydraulic gates and hoists and their regulatory utilities used in dams for power and irrigation projects. The expert areas of the KEL Structural Division located at the Malama unit in Ernakulam district are the design, fabrication and commissioning of hydraulic gates, hoists and their regulatory utilities for power generation / irrigation needs.

=== LT Switchgear Division ===
The Switchgear division located in Olavakkode in Palakkad district started operational in 1977 with technical knowledge adopted from UNELEC, a French company. This unit manufactures isolators / changeovers, switch fuses, fuse units / cutouts, distribution fuse boards / panels and castings used for industrial, commercial and domestic applications through their LT Switchgear Division.

=== Cast Resin Transformer Division ===
In 2010 semi-automated manufacturing and testing facility was established at Edarikode in Malappuram District in order to manufacture Dry type transformers. KEL's Edarikkod unit was commercially operational since January 2010 and had already sold more than 2,400 units of 100-kVA distribution transformers worth Rs 24 crore to KSEB.

== Major projects ==
| Project name | Client | Nature of work |
|---|---|---|
| Falcon Missile Project | R&DE (Engrs.), Pune | Vehicle mounted 62.5 kVA, 415 V, 50 Hz, 3-phase DG set |
| Thrisul Missile Project | DRDO | 50 kVA Dual Output DG Set |
| Prithvi Missile Project | R&DE (Engrs.), Pune | 2 kW, 3000 rpm DG set |
| Pinaka Project | L&T | 8 / 12 kW, 30 V, 400 A Alternator |
| Akash Missile System | BEL | 75 kVA, 220 V, 400 Hz Battery Power Source Vehicle |
| Power Cars of Rajdhani & Shatabdi Express Trains | Indian Railways | 500 kVA, 750 V and 250 kVA, 750 V alternators |
