= Halcyon Castle =

Palace in India

Coordinates: 8.392985°N 76.972358°E

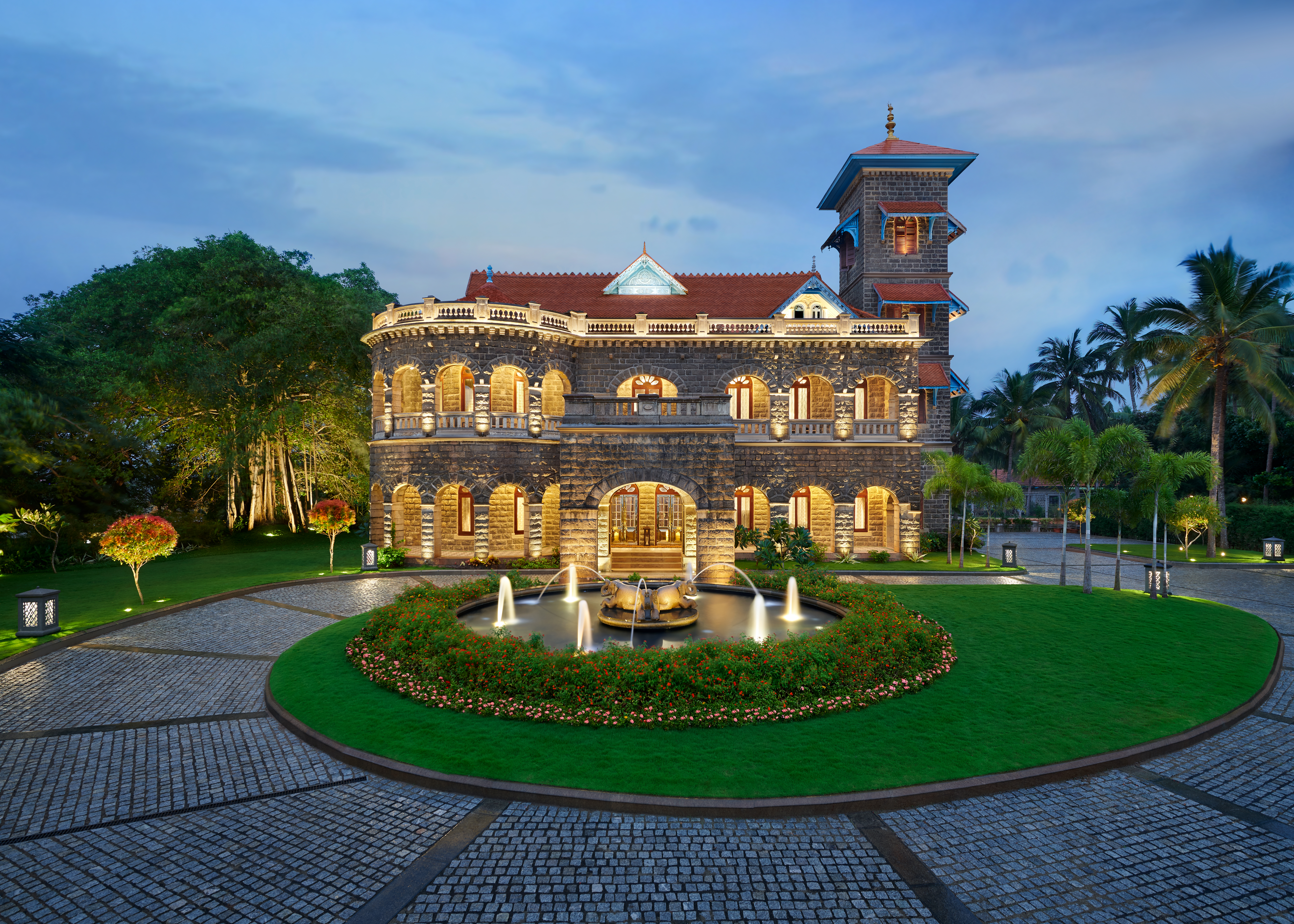
The Kovalam Palace, owned and operated by The Leela Kovalam - A Raviz Hotel.

Halcyon Castle (now called The Kovalam Palace) was built in 1932 in the princely state of Travancore, in the modern-day state of Kerala, India. It was constructed by M.R.Ry Sri Rama Varma Valiya Koil Thampuran, the consort of Maharani Sethu Lakshmi Bayi, as a retreat for their family. In 1964 Valiya Koil Thampuran sold the entire property to the Government of India; since then it has been a luxury hotel. A dispute arose when the India Tourism Development Corporation (ITDC), which was running the hotel, sold it to a private hotel resort group.

In July 2017, the Kerala Cabinet transferred custodial rights of Halcyon Castle and its 4.13 hectares of surrounding land to the RP Group, in compliance with binding High Court and Supreme Court orders. Although the state retains the right to initiate civil proceedings, the RP Group now holds full custodial control and operates the property as a five‑star hotel under The Raviz Hotels & Resorts brand following extensive, heritage sensitive restoration.

== Architecture ==
Halcyon Castle was constructed by M.R. Sri Rama Varma Valiya Koil Thampuran in 1932. The architecture is harmonious fusion of traditional Kerala and European colonial design. The two‑storey structure is set upon a raised plinth and capped by gently sloping tile roofs with broad overhangs, characteristic of Kerala’s monsoon‑resistant vernacular. The building was designed to capture prevailing sea breezes, articulate the façade rhythmically and afford panoramic views of the Arabian Sea.

The interior plan centers on a sequence of grand halls and intimate chambers organized around a central axial corridor. Expansive rectangular halls are defined by high, coffered wooden ceilings and polished teak floors, imported from Idukki forests, while smaller square rooms branch off as private apartments. Decorative elements include circular-edged stone staircases leading to rooftop pavilions, pyramid-shaped parapets, and cubical corner kiosks with domed cupolas, European chateau motifs adapted to a tropical context.
