= Steel and Industrial Forgings Ltd =

Company in Kerala, India

- Industry: Steel
- Headquarters: Athani, Thrissur, Kerala, India
- Area served: India
- Products: Forgings for Aerospace, defence, commercial vehicles, Automobiles, Indian Railways
- Parent: Steel Industries Kerala Limited
- Website: http://www.siflindia.com/

Steel and Industrial Forgings Ltd (SIFL) is a public sector undertaking (PSU) fully owned by Government of Kerala situated in Athani in Thrissur, Kerala state of India. The company was incorporated in 1983 and started commercial production in 1986. It is an AS 9100 C and ISO 9001:2008 certified company.
