= Satheesan ministry =

2026–2031 government of Kerala, India

V. D. Satheesan Ministry
- 24th Ministry of Kerala

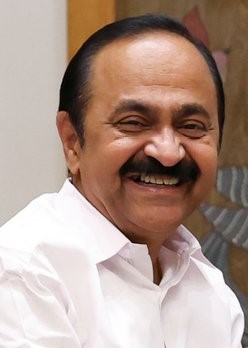
- V. D. Satheesan; Hon'ble Chief Minister of Kerala
- Date formed: 18 May 2026

People and organisations
- Head of state: Rajendra Vishwanath Arlekar (till Oct.2026); Om Prakash Mathur (Current)
- Head of government: V. D. Satheesan
- No. of ministers: 1 Chief minister 20 Cabinet ministers
- Member parties: UDF; INC; IUML; KEC; CMP; RMPI; RSP; KC(J); DCK; Independent
- Status in legislature: Majority
- Opposition party: LDF
- Opposition leader: Pinarayi Vijayan

History
- Election: 2026
- Legislature term: 16th Kerala Assembly
- Predecessor: Second Vijayan ministry

The V. D. Satheesan Ministry is the Council of Ministers headed by V. D. Satheesan that was formed after the United Democratic Front (UDF) won the 2026 Kerala Legislative Assembly elections. The Council assumed office on 18 May 2026. The ministry had a total of 21 ministers in the Cabinet at the time of swearing. V. D. Satheesan was sworn in as 24th chief minister of Kerala, as the 13th person to hold this position.

== Council of Ministers ==
S.No	Name	Portrait	Constituency	Designation	Portfolios	Party
Chief Minister
1.	V. D. Satheesan	Satheeshan.V.D.UDF	Paravur	Chief Minister	General Administration; Finance; Law; Ports; All India Services (IAS, IPS, IFS); Personnel and Administrative Reforms; Election; Disaster Management; Administration of Civil & Criminal Justice; Planning and Economic Affairs; State Goods and Services Tax; Treasury; State Audit; National Savings; State Insurance Department; Stamps and Stamp Duties; Kerala Financial Corporation; Kerala State Financial Enterprises; Non-Resident Keralites Affairs; Distress Relief; Airports; Metro Rail; Railways; Inter-State River Waters; Coastal Shipping and Inland Navigation; Kerala Shipping and Inland Navigation Corporation; Information and Public Relations; Printing and Stationary; Science; Technology; Scientific Institutes; Senior Citizens’ Weflare; Pollution Control; Sainik Welfare; State Hospitality; Integration; Rajiv Gandhi Centre for Biotechnology; National University of Advanced Legal Studies (NUALS); Rajiv Gandhi Academy for Aviation Technology; Posts & Telegraphs; Public Procurement Advisory Department; Khadi and Village Industries; State Lotteries; Agricultural Income Tax; All important policy decisions; Other unallocated portfolios	INC
Cabinet ministers
2.	Ramesh Chennithala		Haripad	Minister for Home, Vigilance and Coir	Home; Vigilance; Prisons; Fire and Rescue Services; Coir	INC
3.	K. Muraleedharan		Vattiyoorkavu	Minister for Health and Family Welfare, and Devaswom	Health; Family Welfare; Ayush; Devaswom; Medical Education; Medical University; Indigenous Medicine; Drugs Control; Food Safety	INC
4.	Sunny Joseph		Peravoor	Minister for Electricity, Environment and Parliamentary Affairs	Electricity; Environment; Parliamentary Affairs; ANERT	INC
5.	Shibu Baby John		Chavara	Minister for Forests and Wild Life, and Skill Development	Forests & Wildlife Protection; Skill Development; Kerala Academy for Skills Excellence (KASE); Employment and Training; Cashew Industry	RSP
6.	Mons Joseph		Kaduthuruthy	Minister for Water Resources and Housing	Irrigation; Command Area Development Authority (CADA); Ground Water Development; Water Supply & Sanitation; Housing	KEC
7.	Anoop Jacob		Piravom	Minister for Food, Civil Supplies, and Consumer Affairs	Food, Civil Supplies; Consumer Affairs; Legal Metrology	KC(J)
8.	P. K. Kunhalikutty		Malappuram	Minister for Industries and Information Technology	Industries and Commerce; Information Technology; Artificial Intelligence; Start Ups; Mining and Geology; Handlooms & Textiles; Plantation Directorate; Industrial Co-operatives; Kerala University of Digital Sciences	IUML
9.	C. P. John		Thiruvananthapuram	Minister for Transport	Road Transport; Motor Vehicles; Water Transport	CMP
10.	A. P. Anil Kumar	A.P._Anil_Kumar	Wandoor	Minister for Revenue	Land Revenue; Survey and Land Records; Land Reforms	INC
11.	N. Samsudheen		Mannarkkad	Minister for General Education and Minority Welfare	General Education; Minority Welfare; Literacy Movement; Waqf Hajj Pilgrimage	IUML
12.	Roji M. John		Angamaly	Minister for Higher Education	Collegiate Education; Technical Education; Universities (Except Agriculture, Veterinary, Fisheries, Medical and Digital Universities); Entrance Examination; National Cadet Corps; Additional Skill Acquisition Programme (ASAP) Kerala	INC
13.	P. C. Vishnunadh		Kundara	Minister for Tourism and Culture	Tourism; Culture; Kerala State Film Development Corporation; Kerala State Chalachithra Academy; Kerala Cultural Activists Welfare Fund Board	INC
14.	Bindhu Krishna		Kollam	Minister for Labour, Dairy Development, Women and Child Development, and Animal Husbandry	Labour; Dairy Development & Milk Co-Operatives; Women & Child Development; Animal Husbandry; Kerala Veterinary & Animal Sciences University; Rehabilitation; Factories and Boilers; Insurance Medical Service; Industrial Tribunals; Labour Courts	INC
15.	M. Liju		Kayamkulam	Minister for Excise and Co-operation	Excise; Co-operation	INC
16.	K. M. Shaji		Vengara	Minister for Local Self Governments	Local Self Government–Panchayat, Municipality and Corporation; Town Planning; Rural Development; Regional Development Authorities; Kerala Institute of Local Administration (KILA)	IUML
17.	P. K. Basheer		Eranad	Minister for Public Works	Public Works Department (PWD)	IUML
18.	V. E. Abdul Gafoor		Kalamassery	Minister for Fisheries and Social Justice	Fisheries; Harbour Engineering; Social Justice; Kerala University of Fisheries and Ocean Studies	IUML
19.	T. Siddique		Kalpetta	Minister for Agriculture	Agriculture; Soil Survey & Soil Conservation; Kerala Agricultural University; Warehousing Corporation	INC
20.	K. A. Thulasi		Kongad	Minister for Welfare of Scheduled Castes, Scheduled Tribes, and Backward Classes	Scheduled Castes Development; Scheduled Tribes Development; Backward Classes Development	INC
21.	O. J. Janeesh		Kodungallur	Minister for Sports, Youth Affairs, Registration and Archaeology	Youth Affairs; Sports; Zoos; Museum; Registration; Archaeology; Archives	INC

== Chair ==
Speaker - Chair
	Name	Portrait	Position	Constituency	District	Party
1	Thiruvanchoor Radhakrishnan		Speaker	Kottayam	Kottayam	INC
2	Shanimol Osman		Deputy Speaker	Aroor	Alappuzha	INC

== Chief whip ==
Chief Whip
	Name	Portrait	Position	Constituency	District	Party
1	Apu John Joseph		Chief Whip	Thodupuzha	Idukki	KEC

== Ministers by party ==
Representation of cabinet ministers by party
1. Indian National Congress (57.1%)
2. Indian Union Muslim League (23.8%)
3. Kerala Congress (4.76%)
4. Revolutionary Socialist Party (India) (4.76%)
5. Kerala Congress (Jacob) (4.76%)
6. Communist Marxist Party (4.76%)

Party	Cabinet ministers
Indian National Congress	12
Indian Union Muslim League	5
Kerala Congress	1
Revolutionary Socialist Party	1
Kerala Congress(J)	1
Communist Marxist Party	1

== Ministers by district ==
Representation of cabinet ministers by district
1. Ernakulam (19.0%)
2. Malappuram (19.0%)
3. Kollam (14.3%)
4. Alappuzha (9.52%)
5. Thiruvananthapuram (9.52%)
6. Palakkad (9.52%)
7. Kannur (4.76%)
8. Wayanad (4.76%)
9. Thrissur (4.76%)
10. Kottayam (4.76%)

Representation of cabinet ministers by district
District	Number of ministers	Ministers	District in-charge minister
Ernakulam	4	V. D. Satheesan, Roji M. John, V. E. Abdul Gafoor, Anoop Jacob	Roji M John
Malappuram	4	A. P. Anil Kumar, P. K. Kunhalikutty, K.M Shaji, P. K. Basheer	P K Basheer
Kollam	3	Bindu Krishna, P. C. Vishnunadh, Shibu Baby John	Shibu Baby John
Alappuzha	2	Ramesh Chennithala, M. Liju	M Liju
Thiruvananthapuram	2	K. Muraleedharan, C. P. John	C P John
Palakkad	2	K.A. Thulasi, N. Samsudheen	N Shamsuddeen
Kannur	1	Sunny Joseph	Sunny Joseph
Wayanad	1	T. Siddique	T Siddique
Thrissur	1	O. J. Janeesh	O J Jeneesh
Kottayam	1	Mons Joseph	Mons Joseph
Kozhikode	0	-	A P Anil Kumar
Kasaragod	0	-	K M Shaji
Pathanamthitta	0	-	P C Vishnunath
Idukki	0	-	Anoop Jacob

== Initiatives ==
- In the first cabinet meeting of this ministry, approval of two Indira Guarantees promised in the UDF manifesto consisting of free KSRTC buses for women and an old age commission.
- A decision was made to investigate the beating of Indian Youth Congress and Kerala Students Union workers during the Navakerala Yatra by the LDF government.
- Formation of the Senior Citizens Welfare Department, described as the first separate department for senior citizens in India.
- Proposal for free health insurance under the “Oommen Chandy Health Insurance” scheme.

== Demographics ==
By religion

Hindu - 9

- Nair - 3 , Ezhava - 3, Marar - 1
- SC - 2

Muslim - 6

Christians - 6

- Syrian Christians - 5
- Latin Catholic - 1

== See also ==
- List of ministries of Kerala
- Chief ministers of Kerala
- List of current Indian chief ministers
- V. D. Satheesan
- 2026 Kerala Legislative Assembly election
- Second Oommen ministry
