= Second Vijayan ministry =

Government of Kerala, India (2021-2026)

- 23rd Ministry of Kerala

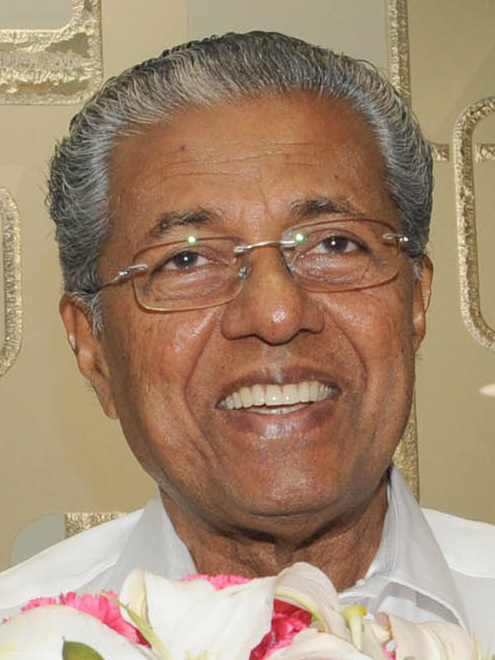
- a portrait of Pinarayi Vijayan
- Date formed: 20 May 2021
- Date dissolved: 18 May 2026

People and organisations
- Governor: Arif Mohammed Khan (till 1 January 2025); Rajendra Arlekar (from 2 January 2025)
- Chief Minister: Pinarayi Vijayan
- No. of ministers: 1 Chief minister 20 Cabinet ministers
- Member parties: LDF; CPI(M); CPI; KC(M); Janata Dal Secular (Thomas); NCP-SP; RJD; KC(B); INL; Cong(S); JKC; Kerala Congress
- Status in legislature: Majority
- Opposition party: UDF
- Opposition leader: V.D. Satheesan

History
- Election: 2021
- Legislature term: 5 years (2021 - 2026)
- Predecessor: First Vijayan ministry
- Successor: Satheesan ministry

The Second Pinarayi Vijayan Ministry is the Council of Ministers headed by Pinarayi Vijayan that was formed after its victory in the 15th Kerala legislative assembly elections by bagging 99 of the 140 seats in the Assembly. The ministry had a total of 21 ministers in the Cabinet compared to 20 ministers in the previous government.

== Council of Ministers ==
S.No	Name		Constituency	Designation	Department	Party	
Chief Minister
1	Pinarayi Vijayan		Dharmadam	Chief Minister	Administration of Civil and Criminal Justice; Airports; All India Services; Coastal Shipping and Inland Navigation; Distress Relief; Disaster management; Election; Fire and Rescue Services; General Administration; Home; Information and Public Relations; Information Technology; Integration; Inter – State River Waters; Kerala State Inland Navigation Corporation; Metro Rail; Non- Resident Keralites’ Affairs; Personnel and Administrative Reforms; Planning and Economic Affairs; Pollution Control; Printing and Stationery; Prisons; Sainik Welfare; Science, Technology and Environment; Scientific Institutes; State Hospitality; Vigilance; State Disaster Management Authority		CPI(M)
Cabinet Ministers
2.	K. Rajan		Ollur	Minister for Revenue and Housing	Land Revenue; Survey and Land Records; Housing; Land Reforms		CPI
3.	Roshy Augustine		Idukki	Minister for Water Resources	Water Resources; Irrigation; Command Area Development Authority; Ground Water Department; Water Supply and Sanitation		KC(M)
4.	K. Krishnankutty		Chittur	Minister for Electricity	Power; Electricity; ANERT		JD(S)
5.	A. K. Saseendran		Elathur	Minister for Forest and Wildlife	Forests; Wild Life Protection		NCP-SP
6.	Kadannappalli Ramachandran	Kadannappally_Ramachandran	Kannur	Minister for Registration, Museums and Archaeology	Registration; Museums; Archaeology; Archives		Cong(S)
7.	K. B. Ganesh Kumar	Ganesh_Kumar_Kollam	Pathanapuram	Minister for Transport	Road Transport; Motor Vehicles Department; Water Transport		KC(B)
8.	V. Abdurahiman		Tanur	Minister for Sports, Wakf and Haj Pilgrimage, Minority welfare	Sports; Wakf and Haj Pilgrimage; Post and Telegraphs; Railways; Welfare of Minorities		NSC
9.	G. R. Anil		Nedumangad	Minister for Food and Civil Supplies	Food and Civil Supplies; Consumer Affairs; Legal Metrology		CPI
10.	K. N. Balagopal		Kottarakkara	Minister for Finance	Finance; National Savings; Stores Purchase; Commercial Taxes, Agricultural Income Tax; Treasuries; Lotteries; State Audit; Kerala State Financial Enterprises; State Insurance; Kerala Financial Corporation; Stamps and Stamp Duties		CPI(M)
11.	R. Bindu		Irinjalakuda	Minister for Higher Education and Social Justice	Higher Education; Collegiate Education; Technical Education; Universities (Except Agriculture, Veterinary, Fisheries, Medical and Digital Universities); Entrance Examinations; National Cadet Corps; Additional Skill Acquisition Programme (ASAP); Social Justice		CPI(M)
12.	J. Chinchu Rani	Chinchu-rani-82406049-removebg-preview	Chadayamangalam	Minister for Animal Husbandry and Dairy Development	Animal Husbandry; Dairy Development, Milk Co-operatives; Zoos; Kerala Veterinary & Animal Sciences University		CPI(M)
13.	M. B. Rajesh		Thrithala	Minister for Parliamentary Affairs, Local Self Governments, Rural Development and Excise	Local Self Governments; Panchayati Raj, Municipalities and Corporations; Rural Development; Town Planning; Regional Development Authorities; KILA; Excise; Parliamentary Affairs		CPI(M)
14.	P. A. Mohammed Riyas		Beypore	Minister for Public Works and Tourism	Public Works Department; Tourism		CPI(M)
15.	P. Prasad		Cherthala	Minister for Agriculture	Agriculture; Soil Survey & Soil Conservation; Kerala Agriculture University; Warehousing Corporation		CPI
16.	O. R. Kelu	O.R._Kelu	Mananthavady	Minister for Welfare of Scheduled Castes, Scheduled Tribes and Backward Classes	Welfare of Scheduled Castes and Scheduled Tribes; Welfare of Backward Classes		CPI(M)
17.	P. Rajeeve		Kalamasseri	Minister for Law, Industries and Coir	Law; Industries (Including Industrial co-operatives); Commerce; Mining and Geology; Handlooms and Textiles; Khadi and Village Industries; Coir; Cashew Industry; Plantation Directorate		CPI(M)
18.	V. Sivankutty		Nemom	Minister for General Education and Labour	General Education; Literacy Movement; Labour; Employment and Training; Skills, Rehabilitation; Factories and Boilers; Insurance Medical Service; Industrial Tribunals; Labour Courts		CPI(M)
19.	V. N. Vasavan		Ettumanoor	Minister for Co-operation, Ports and Devaswoms	Cooperation; Ports; Devaswoms		CPI(M)
20.	Veena George		Aranmula	Minister for Health and Woman and Child Development	Health; Family Welfare; Medical Education; Medical University; Indigenous Medicine; AYUSH; Drugs Control; Woman & Child Welfare		CPI(M)
21.	Saji Cherian		Chengannur	Minister for Fisheries and Cultural affairs	Fisheries; Harbour Engineering; Fisheries University; Youth Affairs; Culture; Kerala State Film Development Corporation; Kerala State Chalachitra Academy; Kerala State Cultural Activists Welfare Fund Board		CPI(M)

== Chair and Chief whip ==
S.No	Name	Position	Constituency	District	Party
Chair
1	A. N. Shamseer	Speaker	Thalassery	Kannur	CPI(M)
2	Chittayam Gopakumar	Deputy Speaker	Adoor	Pathanamthitta	CPI
Chief Whip
1	N. Jayaraj	Chief Whip	Kanjirappally	Kottayam	KC(M)

== Former cabinet members ==
Name	Position		Constituency	Status		Party	Remarks
Saji Cherian	Minister	Fisheries, Culture	Chengannur	Resigned	6 July 2022	CPI(M)	Rejoined Cabinet later
M. V. Govindan	Minister	Local self Government	Taliparamba	Resigned	2 September 2022	CPI (M)	Resigned to take charge as state secretary of CPI(M)
Ahamed Devarkovil	Minister	Ports, Museum, Archeology, Archives	Kozhikode South	Resigned	24 December 2023	INL	Resigned as part of Cabinet reshuffle
Antony Raju	Minister	Transport	Thiruvananthapuram Central	Resigned	24 December 2023	JKC	Resigned as part of Cabinet reshuffle
K. Radhakrishnan	Minister	Scheduled Castes, Scheduled Tribes, Backward Classes, Parliamentary affairs, Devaswoms	Chelakkara	Resigned	17 June 2024	CPI (M)	Resigned to take charge as MP of Alathur

== Swearing Ceremony ==
Pinarayi Vijayan Ministry took oath at the Central Stadium in Thiruvananthapuram on 20 May 2021 Thursday at 3:30 IST. The new Kerala state cabinet had 21 members including the chief minister. This time, the ruling Left Democratic Front had decided to replace all sitting ministers. Before taking oath, all CPI(M) ministers offered prayers at the Martyrs Column in Alappuzha. The swearing ceremony took place in strict adherence to COVID-19 protocol. Around 350 people attended the ceremony.

== Notable work ==
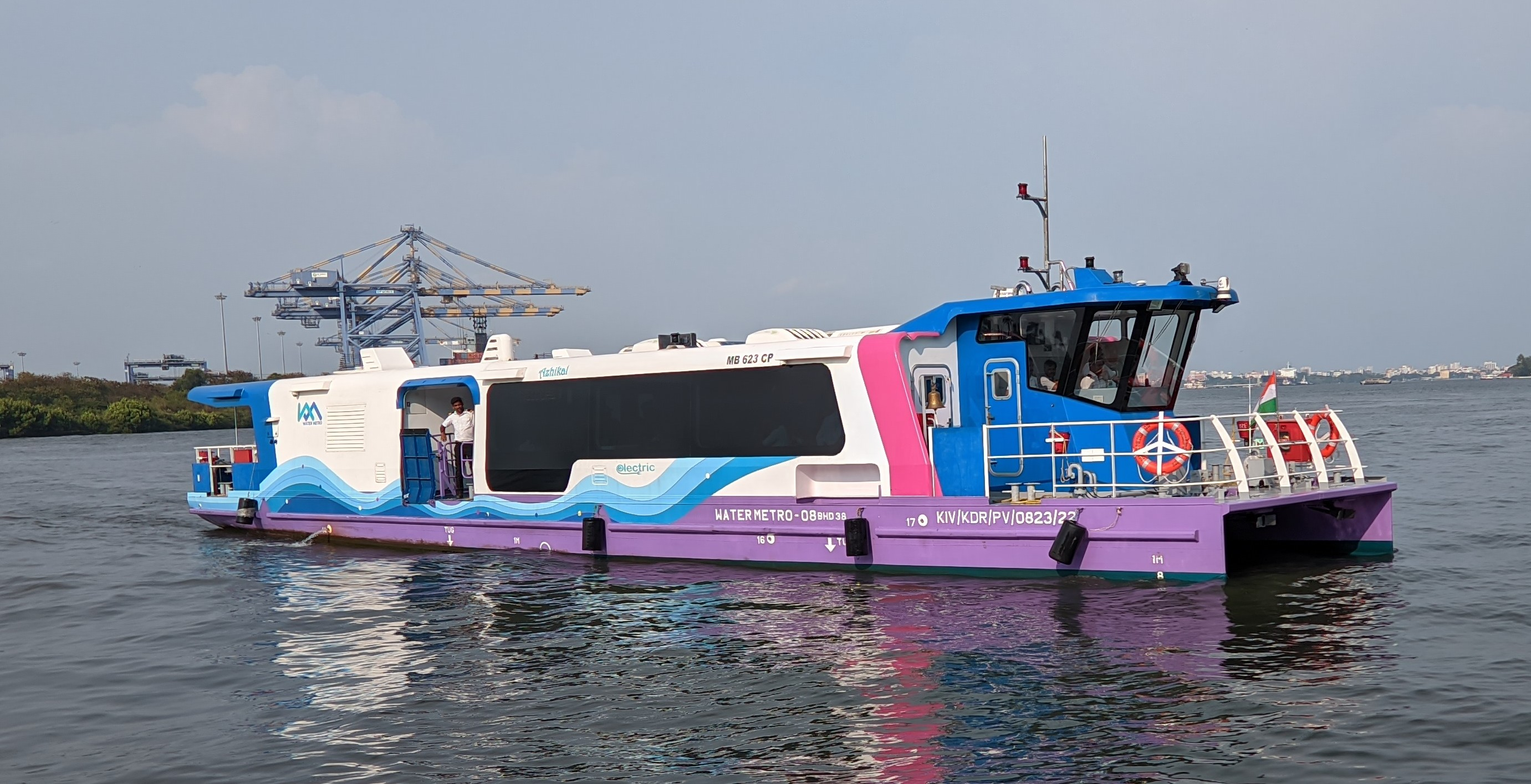
Kochi Water Metro

- Vijayan inaugurated the Kochi Water Metro, India's first water metro system in 2021. It is also described as possibly the largest electric boat metro transportation infrastructure being implemented in the world.
- In 2023, his ministry introduced 'Mission 1000', an initiative to select 1,000 micro, small and medium enterprises (MSME) and turn them into ventures with Rs 100 crore turnover in four years.
- Kerala Fiber Optic Network (K-FON) is a public-funded initiative by the Government of Kerala that aims to provide high-speed Internet connectivity to the whole Indian state of Kerala. More than 20 lakh BPL families in the state are expected to get free internet access, according to the project. The project was inaugurated on 5 June 2023 by the Chief Minister Pinarayi Vijayan.
- Kerala Startup Mission became one of the top 5 startup incubators in the world in 2023.
- On 28 June 2023, Pinarayi Vijayan launched 'Pride Project' to provide jobs for transgender people. This project is also a part of the Kerala government's effort to give jobs to 2 million people by 2026.
- A statewide outreach programme Nava Kerala Sadas was organised by the government where the chief minister and Kerala Council of Ministers travelled through all assembly constituencies of the state.
- On 1 January 2024, K-Smart app was launched for digital access to services of local body institutions and government services in Kerala.

== Reception ==
- The Pinarayi Vijayan government's decision to hold a swearing-in ceremony though under strict social distancing norms were criticed by IMA . The Kerala chapter of the Indian Medical Association had earlier urged the government to organise the swearing-in ceremony virtually.
- Former health minister K. K. Shailaja, who tenured during the COVID-19 crisis, is not a part of the new state cabinet, which is set to have freshers from CPI(M) and CPI, with CM Pinarayi Vijayan being the exception. Shailaja garnered public attention after her involvement in containing the spread of COVID-19 in the initial phase of the pandemic in the state. She had previously worked on the containment of the Nipah virus in Kerala as well, in 2018 and 2019. Shailaja has received awards for her prompt action in tracking, isolation, and containment of the spread of the COVID-19. Many have taken to social media to express their displeasure over the exclusion of Shailaja from the cabinet. They opined that the role played by her in the victory of LDF was commendable.
- In the first years of the government, Pinarayi Vijayan held the portfolio of Minority Welfare, which in the previous Pinarayi government was held by Minister K.T. Jaleel. In January 2023, Pinarayi gave the portfolio of Minority Welfare to Minister V. Abdurrahiman, after controversy. In the previous Pinarayi government, the Disaster Management and State Disaster Management Authority were under Revenue Minister E. Chandrashekharan, while in this ministry, Pinarayi holds the portfolio of the Disaster Management Department.

== Demographics ==
Ministers by party

Representation of cabinet ministers by party
1. Communist Party of India (Marxist) (52.4%)
2. Communist Party of India (19.1%)
3. Kerala Congress (M) (4.76%)
4. Nationalist Congress Party – Sharadchandra Pawar (4.76%)
5. Janata Dal (Secular) (4.76%)
6. National Secular Conference (4.76%)
7. Kerala Congress (B) (4.76%)
8. Congress (Secular) (4.76%)

Party	Cabinet ministers
Communist Party of India (Marxist)	11
Communist Party of India	4
Kerala Congress (M)	1
Nationalist Congress Party – Sharadchandra Pawar	1
Janata Dal (Secular)	1
National Secular Conference	1
Kerala Congress (B)	1
Congress (Secular)	1

Geographical Distribution

Kollam District has the most number of ministers with 3. Kannur, Kozhikode, Palakkad, Thrissur, Alappuzha and Thiruvananthapuram has 2 ministers each. Wayanad, Malappuram, Ernakulam, Idukki, Kottayam and Pathanamthitta has 1 minister each.

Religious Distribution

16 - Hindu, 3 - Christian, 2 - Muslim

== See also ==
- List of Kerala ministers
- Chief Ministers of Kerala
- History of Kerala
- List of current Indian chief ministers
- Pinarayi Vijayan
- First Pinarayi Vijayan Ministry
