= Kerala Government Secretariat =

Government building in Kerala, India

Kerala Government Secretariat Building
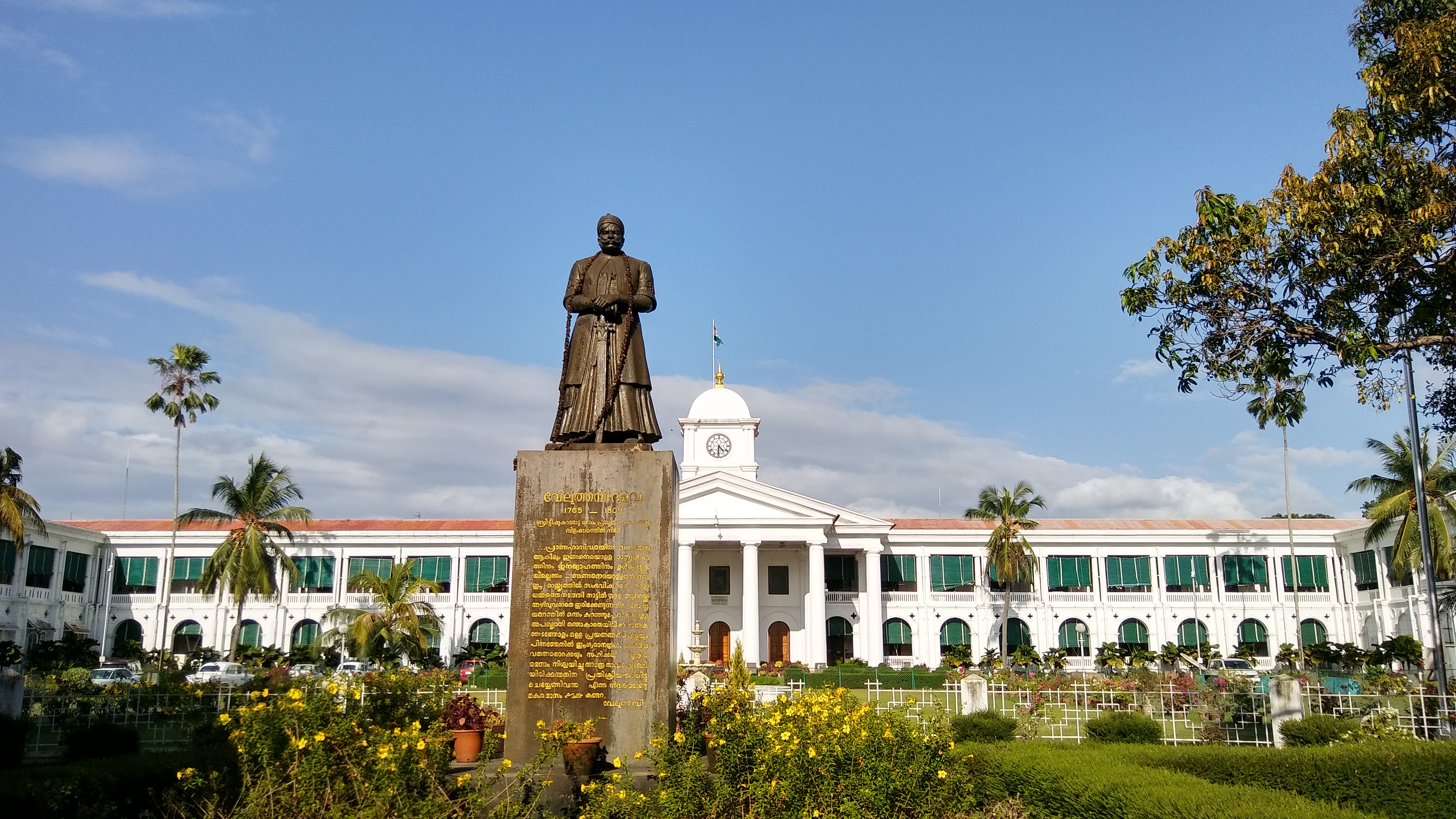
- Front view of the Secretariat Building

- Location within Kerala Location within India
- Former names: Huzur, Puthen Kacheri

General information
- Architectural style: Roman and Dutch, among others
- Location: Thiruvananthapuram, Kerala, India
- Coordinates: 8.4972°N 76.9495°E
- Construction started: 1865
- Completed: 1869
- Owner: Government of Kerala

Design and construction
- Architect: Barton

Website
- gad.kerala.gov.in

The Kerala Government Secretariat (Malayalam: Saṁsthāna Sarkkār Sirākēndraṁ) is the seat of administration of the Government of Kerala, in Thiruvananthapuram, housing important ministries and bureaucratic offices. It is the highest echelon of state administrative structure offering locus for the exercise of executive authority by the State Government of Kerala. The secretariat refers to the complex of departments. Its political heads are the ministers while the administrative heads are the Secretaries to the Government. The Government Secretariat is a popular landmark and located in heart of the Thiruvananthapuram City, in Narmada Road. The Secretariat complex was originally constructed as Durbar Hall for Travancore Kingdom.

== History ==
Over 150 years old, the building's foundation stone was laid by His Highness Ayilyam Thirunal, the Maharaja of Travancore in 1865 and was completed in 1869. The original structure was planned to accommodate Travancore Royal Durbar Hall where the King meets his council of ministers on a monthly basis apart from the offices of Peshkars (Secretaries of the State). It was designed and built under Walthew Clarence Barton, the then chief engineer of Travancore and incorporates elements of Roman and Dutch architecture. The construction was supervised by the then Dewan, T. Madhava Rao, whose statue now stands across the road opposite the building.

His Highness Chithira Tirunal, the last king of Travancore, was crowned king in a ceremony held at the Secretariat. The Secretariat also housed the Kerala State Legislative Assembly from 1939 before it moved to the new building. Lord Willingdon, the then Viceroy laid the foundation stone for the new Assembly Building on 12 December 1933 and it was opened on 6 February 1939 by Dewan Sir C. P. Ramaswami Iyer and the Second Sri Mulam popular Assembly convened in this building that year.

Known during the princely era as the Huzur or Puthen Kacheri, it was renamed the Government Secretariat in 1949. The Secretariat is the nerve centre of Kerala's governance and hence is also the site of political protests and it often witnesses marches and demonstrations outside its walls.

== Structure ==
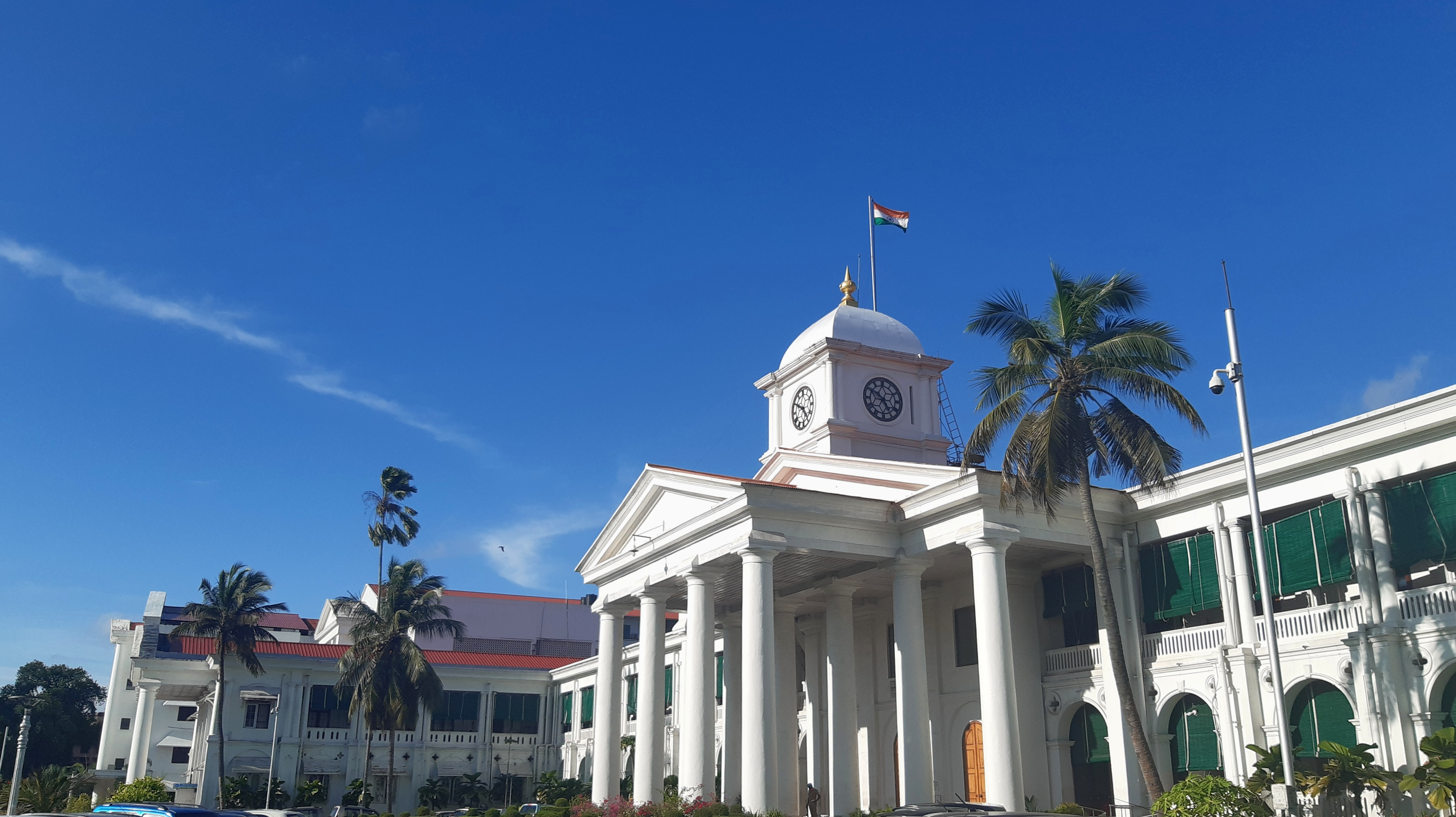
The central block

Kerala Secretariat Complex consists of 3 blocks. The central block is the oldest structure. The Central Block has main door known as Ana Kavadam (Elephant Door), which opens to the grand Durbar Hall. This Durbar hall earlier was used only by Travancore Maharaja and his courtiers with limited public entry. Today the Durbar Hall is converted into State Ceremonies Hall where public meetings and state ceremonies are held.

There are 20 doors located in either side of the Durbar Hall. The Central block has 2 stories and houses offices of various departments. The Old Assembly Hall is located in ground floor of the Central Block at the right, which is now converted into a public legislative museum, depicting the legislative history of Kerala. There are plans to introduce Kerala Institute of Parliamentary Affairs to this complex.

Apart from the central block, two new blocks, North Block and South block, were constructed on either side of the central block. The South block was opened by the then Hon. Chief Minister of Kerala Sri. Pattom A. Thanupillai on 18 August 1961. Later two "Sandwich" blocks were also constructed in between the central and the new blocks. The North Block, located at North Gate, houses office of the Hon. Chief Minister of Kerala, offices of a few cabinet ministers and cabinet room. The South Sandwich Block and North Sandwich Block houses primarily offices Government secretaries, though a few offices of ministers are located here due to congestion in north block.

== Departments ==
Kerala Secretariat complex houses offices of various state government department. The business of the State Government is transacted through the following Secretariat Department based on the Kerala Secretariat Rules of Business (KSRB).

No.	Department
1	Agricultural Development and Farmers Welfare Department
2	Animal Husbandry Department
3	Ayush Department
4	Backward Communities Development Department
5	Co-operation Department
6	Coastal Shipping & Inland Navigation Department
7	Consumer Affairs Department
8	Cultural Affairs Department
9	Dairy Development Department
10	Disaster Management Department
11	Elderly Welfare Department
12	Election Department
13	Electronics & Information Technology Department
14	Environment Department
15	Finance Department
16	Fisheries and Ports Department
17	Food and Civil Supplies Department
18	Forests and Wildlife Department
19	General Administration Department
20	General Education Department
21	Health & Family Welfare Department
22	Higher Education Department
23	Home Department
24	Housing Department
25	Industries and Commerce Department
26	Information and Public Relations Department
27	Labour and Skills Department
28	Law Department
29	Local Self Government Department
30	Minority Welfare Department
31	Non Resident Keralites Affairs (NORKA) Department
32	Parliamentary Affairs Department
33	Personnel & Administrative Reforms Department
34	Planning and Economic Affairs Department
35	Programme Implementation, Evaluation and Monitoring Department
36	Power Department
37	Public Procurement Advisory Department
38	Public Works Department
39	Revenue Department
40	Sainik Welfare Department
41	Scheduled Caste and Scheduled Tribes Development Department
42	Science & Technology Department
43	Social Justice Department
44	Sports & Youth Affairs Department
45	Taxes Department
46	Tourism Department
47	Transport Department
48	Vigilance Department
49	Water Resources Department
50	Women & Child Development Department
