= J. Chinchu Rani =

Indian politician

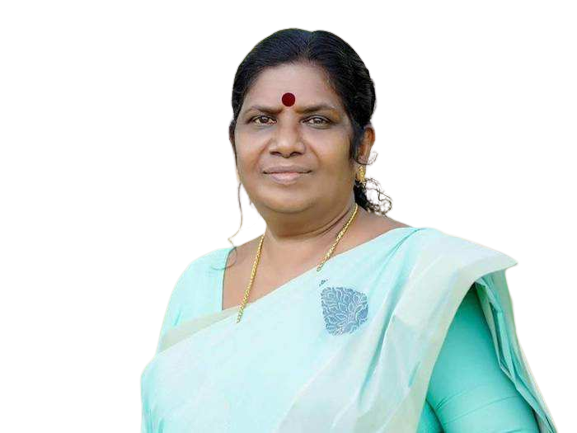

Minister for Animal Husbandry & Dairy Development
- In office 20 May 2021 – 23 May 2026
- Chief Minister: Pinarayi Vijayan
- Preceded by: K. Raju
- Succeeded by: Bindhu Krishna

Member of the Kerala Legislative Assembly
- In office 24 May 2021 – 23 May 2026
- Preceded by: Mullakara Ratnakaran
- Constituency: Chadayamangalam

Personal details
- Born: Kollam, Kerala, India
- Party: Communist Party of India

J. Chinchu Rani is an Indian politician from Kollam, Kerala. She served as Minister for Animal Husbandry, Dairy Development, Milk Co-operatives, Zoos, Kerala Veterinary & Animal Sciences University, Government of Kerala; representing Chadayamangalam constituency in the 15th Kerala Legislative Assembly from May 2021 to May 2026.

== Personal life ==
She was born to Mundakkal Bharanikkavu Thekkevilayil Veliyil Vadakkathil N. Sreedharan and Jagadamma. Her father was an early communist activist and cashew workers union member. Her husband D. Sukeshan is CPI Anchaalummoodu Mandalam Secretary and District Secretary of Library Council. They have two children, Nandu Sukeshan and Nandana Rani.

== Political career ==
She is a member of the CPI National Council and a member of the CPI State Executive. In addition, she also holds the positions of Kerala Mahila Sangam State President, Poultry Corporation Chairperson and President of Achutha Menon Co-operative Hospital.
