= N. Prasanth =

Indian civil servant

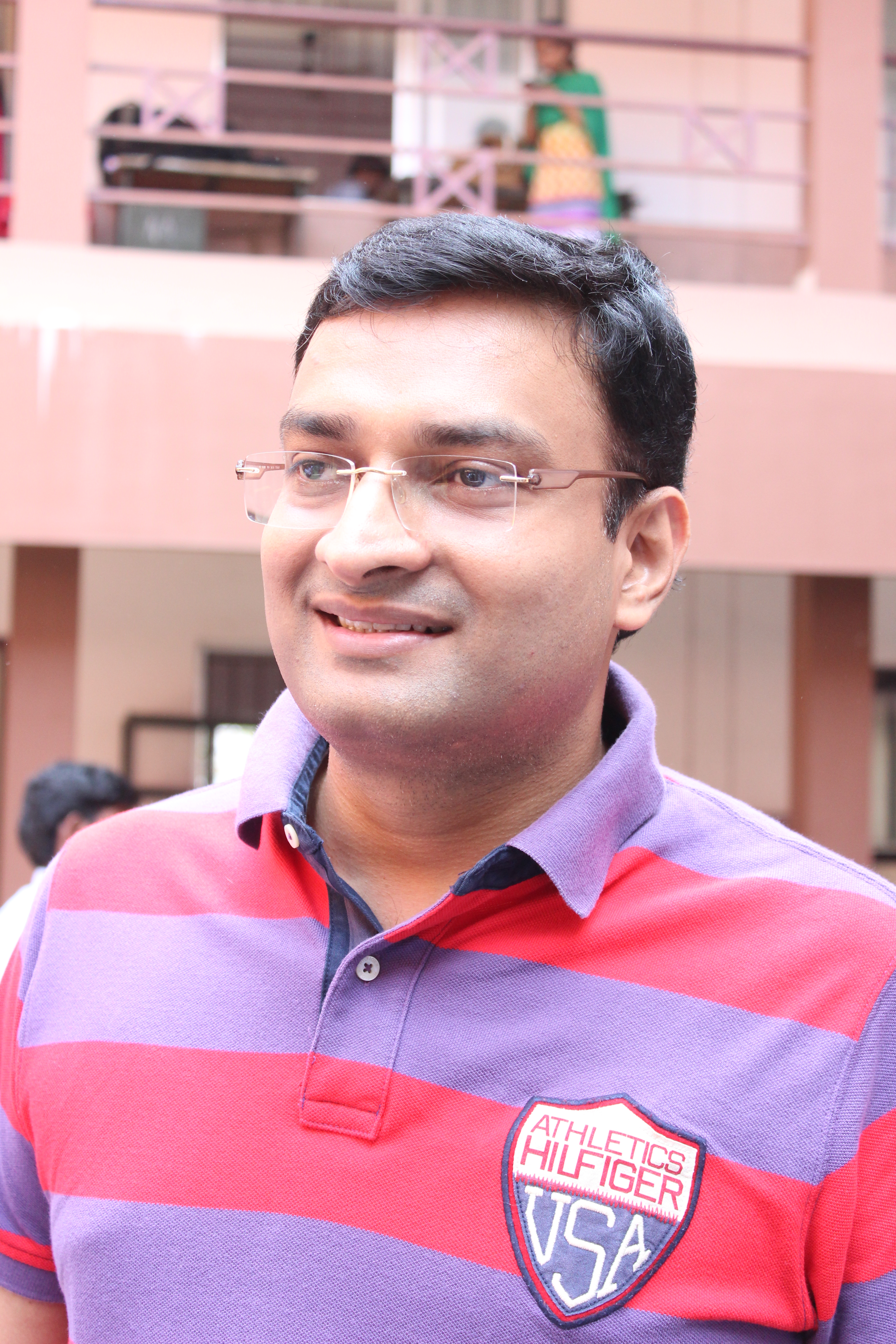
- Prasanth in 2015

Secretary to the Government of Kerala
- Departments: Sports and Youth Affairs, Archeology, Archives, Zoos, Museum
- Incumbent
- Assumed office 2019

District Collector of Kozhikode
- In office 2015–2017

Personal details
- Born: Thalassery, Kannur district, Kerala, India
- Education: Government Law College, Thiruvananthapuram
- Occupation: Civil servant, Administrator
- Known for: "Collector Bro"; Compassionate Kozhikode; Operation Sulaimani

Prasanth Nair (also known as N. Prasanth) is an Indian civil servant and a 2007-batch Indian Administrative Service (IAS) officer of the Kerala cadre. He gained public attention during his tenure as the District Collector of Kozhikode from 2015 to 2017, where he was given the nickname "Collector Bro" for his informal, social-media-driven approach to public administration. As Collector of Kozhikode, he launched the Compassionate Kozhikode initiative, under which the free food programme Operation Sulaimani was introduced.

Prasath Nair secured All India Rank 4 in the 2007 Civil Services Examination conducted by the Union Public Service Commission (UPSC).

== Early life and education ==
Prasanth grew up in Thiruvananthapuram, Kerala. He graduated in law from the Government Law College, Thiruvananthapuram, affiliated with the University of Kerala.

== Civil service career ==
Prasanth was selected for the Indian Administrative Service in the 2007 batch and was allotted to the Kerala cadre. He has served in various departments including taxation, tourism, water supply, roads, and skill development.

=== District Collector of Kozhikode (2015–2017) ===
Prasanth took charge as the District Collector of Kozhikode in February 2015. During his tenure, he became known for the use of social media in governance, personally managing the official Facebook page of the Kozhikode District Collector and using it to engage directly with residents, respond to complaints, and mobilise public participation in civic projects. His informal communication style, which included responding to citizens as "bro" rather than the conventional "sir", led to him being popularly called "Collector Bro".

As Collector, Prasanth launched the Compassionate Kozhikode initiative, an initiative intended to foster civic participation and volunteerism in the district. Under this programme, he introduced Operation Sulaimani, a free food scheme implemented in partnership with the Kerala Hotel and Restaurants Association that allowed those who could not afford a meal to eat at participating restaurants using coupons issued by the district administration. The project was named after sulaimani, a spiced black tea popular in the Malabar region.

Another initiative during his tenure was a crowdsourced drive to clean the 14-acre Pisharikavu pond in Koyilandy, in which volunteers who participated were offered a plate of Malabar biryani by the district administration.

=== 2024 suspension ===
In November 2024, the Kerala government suspended Prasanth, then serving as Special Secretary in the Agriculture Department, for alleged violation of the All India Services (Conduct) Rules, 1968. The action followed a social media post by Prasanth accusing Additional Chief Secretary (Finance) A. Jayathilak of preparing a report unfairly blaming him for the disappearance of files related to the Unnathi project, a Kerala government initiative for the welfare of Scheduled Castes and Scheduled Tribes students, of which Prasanth had been the CEO.
