= Sruthitharangam (Cochlear Implantation Scheme) =

Cochlear implantation scheme in Kerala, India

Sruthitharangam is a cochlear implantation scheme introduced by the Government of Kerala to provide financial assistance for children with severe hearing impairment. The scheme aims to support cochlear implant surgeries for people who are unable to afford the procedure on their own, targeting those from low-income families.

== Features ==
Under the Sruthitharangam scheme, children of 0–3 years who are hearing impaired will be provided free cochlear implantation surgery. The beneficiaries must be residents of Kerala state with annual income of the family being less than ₹2 Lakhs.

== Administration ==
Sruthitharangam program is administered by the Kerala Social Security Mission. According to the guidelines of this scheme, the parents/guardians of the child with hearing impairment and high chance of success after cochlear implantation as detected by an audiological centre applies to the Kerala Social Security Mission for financial assistance. The decision regarding financial assistance is given by the Regional Screening Committee on the basis of pre-operative assessments. During 2012-13 to 2016-17, ₹ 34.18 crores were spent for 733 children under this program.
