= Snehapoorvam (scheme) =

Welfare scheme for orphans in Kerala

The Snehapoorvam Scheme is a welfare initiative introduced by the Kerala Social Security Mission in 2012, aimed at providing financial assistance and social support to children from economically disadvantaged families, especially those who have lost their parents or guardians. Launched in 2005 under the Department of Social Justice, the scheme seeks to ensure that vulnerable children receive adequate financial support to meet their basic needs and continue their education.

== Beneficiaries ==
The beneficiaries of this scheme are children who have lost their father or mother or both, residing in Kerala and belonging to 'below poverty line' category. For children from families belonging to 'above poverty line' category, the annual income should be less than ₹ 20,000 in rural areas (Local body/Grama Panchayat) and ₹22,375 in urban areas (Corporation/ Municipality). The financial assistance is ₹300 per month for children below 5 years and those between class 1 and 5, ₹ 500 per month for class 6-10, ₹ 750 per month for class 11-12 and ₹ 1000 for degree courses.

There were approximately 75,000 orphan children in 2013 in Kerala, which fell to approximately 38,000 in 2014 after the launch of this scheme.
