= Malankara Action Council for Church Act Association =

MACCABI
- Malankara Action Council for Church Act Association
- മക്കാബി
- Abbreviation: MACCABI
- Nickname: MACCABI
- Formation: 3 July 2019
- Founder: Bar Yuhanon Ramban
- Purpose: Public Movement
- Location: Piramadom
- Region served: Kerala
- Services: Religious Organization
- Official language: Malayalam, English
- Website: www.maccabimovement.com

Malankara Action Council for Church Act Association (MACCABI) is a public movement started for the implementation of Church Act 2009 submitted before the government of Kerala by the Kerala Law Reforms Commission headed by Justice V.R Krishna Iyer in 2009. MACCABI is an independent non-profit organization registered under the Travancore-Cochin registration act.

== Public Movements ==
=== 22 May 2018 ===
A secretariat March was jointly organised by All Kerala Church Act Action Council and MACCABI asking the government to pass the bill in the assembly. March started from Palayam Marty's Square and staged a dharna in front of the Secretariat.

=== 12 October 2019 ===
Bar Yuhanon Ramban, Director of MACCABI, inaugurated the event organized by Members of ‘Justice for Sr Lucy’, held at Vanchi Square in Ernakulam in support of Lucy Kalappura, who was expelled from the Franciscan Clarist Congregation (FCC) for her lifestyle violations.

=== 27 November 2019 ===
More than 50,000 Christians was reported to have marched to the Secretariat demanding the State government to implement the Kerala Church Properties and Institutions Trust Bill, proposed by Justice V.R. Krishna Iyer in 2009.
