= Thalolam =

Thalolam (lit. 'soothening') may refer to:

- Thalolam (film), a 1998 Indian Malayalam-language film
- Thalolam (scheme), a social security scheme by the Government of Kerala, India
- Thalolam kunje, a Mappila song in the Malayalam-language
