= Department of Senior Citizens =

Government department of Kerala, India

- Emblem of Kerala

Department overview
- Formed: 20 May 2026; 5 months ago
- Preceding Department: Social Justice Department
- Jurisdiction: Government of Kerala
- Headquarters: Kerala Government Secretariat, Thiruvananthapuram, Kerala, India
- Annual budget: ₹10 crore (US$1.0 million) (2026–27)
- Minister responsible: V.D. Satheesan, Chief Minister of Kerala and Minister for Senior Citizens Welfare
- Department executives: Rathan U Kelkar, I.A.S, Secretary to Government; Arun S. Nair, I.A.S., Director
- Key documents: Government Order No. 63/2026/GAD; Maintenance and Welfare of Parents and Senior Citizens Act, 2007
- Website: https://vayojanam.kerala.gov.in/

The Department of Senior Citizens, formerly known as Elderly Welfare Department is an administrative department of the Government of Kerala established on 20 May 2026. Prior to its formation, senior citizens' welfare was administered by the Social Justice Department. The department is responsible for formulating and implementing policies aimed at the welfare of senior citizens. It has its headquarters in the Government Secretariat, Thiruvananthapuram.

The department is considered the first dedicated department for senior citizens welfare established by a state government in India.

The department functions as the nodal agency for the implementation of various senior citizens welfare legislations, schemes and missions, and coordinates with line departments and field agencies to ensure effective service delivery.

== History ==
The proposal to create a separate department for the welfare of senior citizens was included in the election manifesto of the United Democratic Front (UDF). After coming to power, the V. D. Satheesan-led UDF government formed the Department of Senior Citizens Welfare by separating the senior citizens welfare portfolio from the Social Justice Department. The department was constituted on 19 May 2026 through Government Order No. 63/2026/GAD.

== Functions ==
The department is tasked with the formulation and implementation of welfare programmes for senior citizens, and the implementation and coordination of existing programmes and schemes.

1. Administration of Acts and Rules relating to the welfare of the elderly.
2. Implementation of Policies relating to the welfare of the elderly.
3. Implementation of Centrally Sponsored Schemes relating to the welfare of the senior citizens.
4. Implementation of various schemes relating to the welfare of the elderly.
5. The Kerala State Commission for the Elderly
6. Old-age homes

== Leadership ==
The Department of Senior Citizens Welfare functions under the leadership of a Cabinet Minister of the Government of Kerala.

The Senior Citizens Welfare Department is administratively headed by a Secretary to Government, an Indian Administrative Service cadre officer, assisted by Additional Secretaries/Deputy Secretaries, Under Secretaries, and Section Officers at the Government Secretariat.

== Allied institutions ==
- Kerala State Elderly Commission

=== Associated agencies ===
- Kerala Social Security Mission
- Local Bodies (Panchayats and Municipalities)
- Local Self Government Department (LSGD)
- Health and Family Welfare Department, Kerala
- Ayush Department (Kerala)

== Welfare Schemes ==
- Vayo Mithram
  - Health care scheme implemented by Kerala Social Security Mission for senior citizens above 65 years residing in municipality and corporation areas of Kerala. It provides mobile clinic services, palliative care, free medicines,and counseling other supports for elderly persons. The project implemented as a joint initiative to Local Self Government in the area.
- Vayoraksha
  - Vayoraksha is a welfare and emergency assistance scheme for senior citizens belonging to the BPL category. The scheme offers medical aid, rehabilitation, caregiver support, legal assistance and emergency protection for elderly persons in distress.
- Vayo amrutham
  - The scheme provides ayurvedic treatments, palliative care, and counseling for inmates suffering from chronic and age-related diseases in government old-age homes. The project implemented as a joint initiative by the Indian Systems of Medicine Department.
- Rapid Response Team for Senior Citizens;

== See also ==
- Government of Kerala
- Department of Women and Child Development (Kerala)
- Department of Social Justice (Kerala)
