= Kerala State Disaster Management Authority =

Government agency of Kerala

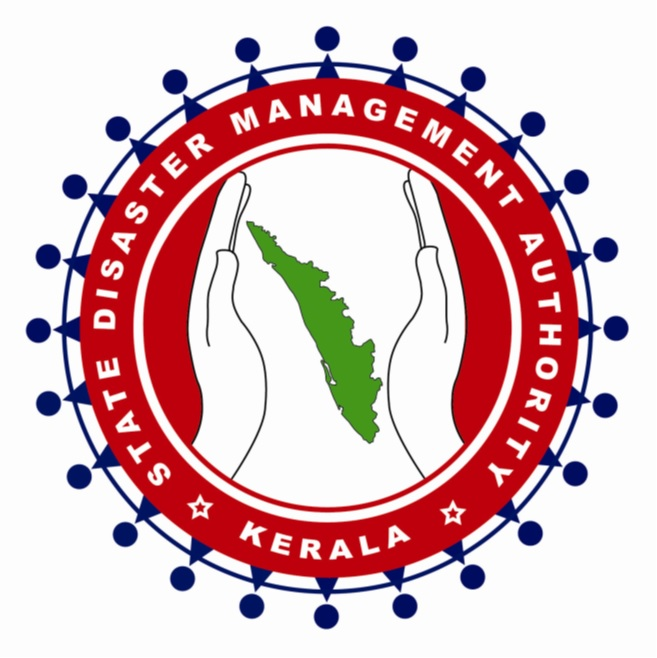

Agency overview
- Formed: May 4, 2007; 19 years ago
- Jurisdiction: Government of Kerala
- Headquarters: Thiruvananthapuram, Kerala, India
- Motto: Towards a Safer State
- Minister responsible: V.D. Satheesan, Chief Minister of Kerala, Chairperson
- Agency executives: Biswanath Sinha IAS, Chief Executive Officer; Jeevan Babu IAS, Convenor; Dr. Sekhar L Kuriakose, Member Secretary
- Parent department: Disaster Management Department, Government of Kerala
- Child agency: State Disaster Response Force (SDRF)
- Key document: Disaster Management Act, 2005
- Website: sdma.kerala.gov.in

The Kerala State Disaster Management Authority (KSDMA) is a government agency in the Indian state of Kerala. Established in 2007, the agency is responsible for disaster preparedness, mitigation, response and recovery in the state. It is a statutory body constituted under the Disaster Management Act, 2005, and functions under the chairmanship of the Chief Minister of Kerala.

== History ==
The Kerala State Disaster Management Authority (KSDMA) was constituted on 4 May 2007 through S.R.O. No. 395/2007 under the Disaster Management Act, 2005. The present composition of the authority was notified through S.R.O. No. 583/2013 dated 17 July 2013.

== Functions and responsibilities ==
The KSDMA functions under the Distaster Management Department of the Government of Kerala.

== Composition ==
SDMA is constituted of a chairperson and ten members:

Constituent	Role	Incumbent
Chief Minister of Kerala	Chairperson	V.D Satheesan
Minister for Revenue	Vice Chairperson	A.P Anil Kumar
Minister for Agriculture	Member	T. Siddique
Minister for Home	Member	Ramesh Chennithala
Chief Secretary of Kerala	Chief Executive Officer	Biswanath Sinha IAS
Additional Chief Secretary, Home Department	Member	Minhaj Alam IAS
Secretary to Government, Disaster Management	Convenor	Jeevan Babu IAS
Head of Kerala State Emergency Operations Centre	Member Secretary	Dr. Sekhar L Kuriakose.

=== State Executive Committee (SEC) ===
The State Executive Committee of KSDMA handles the day-to-day disaster management activities in Kerala under the Disaster Management Act, 2005 and the Kerala State Disaster Management Rules, 2007.

- Chief Secretary of Kerala - CEO (Ex-officio)
- Additional Chief Secretary (Home) - member
- Additional Chief Secretary (Finance) - member
- Additional Chief Secretary (Health and Family Welfare) - member
- Principal Secretary (Revenue/Disaster Management) - Convenor (Ex-officio)

=== Kerala State Emergency Operations Centre ===
The State Emergency Operations Centre (SEOC) is the research, technical, and emergency coordination wing of the Kerala State Disaster Management Authority. It functions under the direct control of the Secretary to Government (Revenue and Distaster Management), and headed by Member Secretary & Head of SEOC. The SEOC is tasked with disaster preparedness, planning, and response activities across Kerala, and it is the technical wing of the KSDMA.

The responsibilities of the SEOC are as follows:

- Updating hazard and vulnerability assessments
- Preparing State and District Disaster Management Plans
- Supporting early warning systems
- Coordinating emergency response activities
- Monitoring drought situations
- Carrying out disaster risk reduction studies
- Conducting training in disaster management

The State Emergency Operations Centre has the following specialised divisions;

- Fusion Centre
- Drought Monitoring Cell
- GIS and Risk Lab
- IT & Communication Centre
- Planning Group
- Capacity Building and Projects Group
- Administration Division

== District Disaster Management Authorities ==
There are District Disaster Management Authorities (DDMAs) in each of the 14 districts of Kerala under the chairmanship of the respective District Collectors. These authorities coordinate and oversee disaster management activities at the district level.

== State Disaster Response Force (SDRF) ==
The State Disaster Response Force (SDRF) was formed by the Government of Kerala through GO (Ms) No. 262/2012/Home dated 17 October 2012 and GO (Rt) No. 2421/2013/Home dated 31 August 2013. The Rapid Response and Rescue Force (RRRF) based at Pandikkad in Malappuram district, the force has a strength of 100 personnel. It is headed by a Superintendent of Police (SP) and functions under the Additional Chief Secretary (Home), who is a member of the Kerala State Disaster Management Authority. SDRF units are deployed in the Thiruvananthapuram, Ernakulam, Thrissur and Kannur police ranges, and personnel receive training from the National Disaster Response Force (NDRF).

== See also ==
- National Disaster Management Authority (India)
