= Niyamasabha Mandiram =

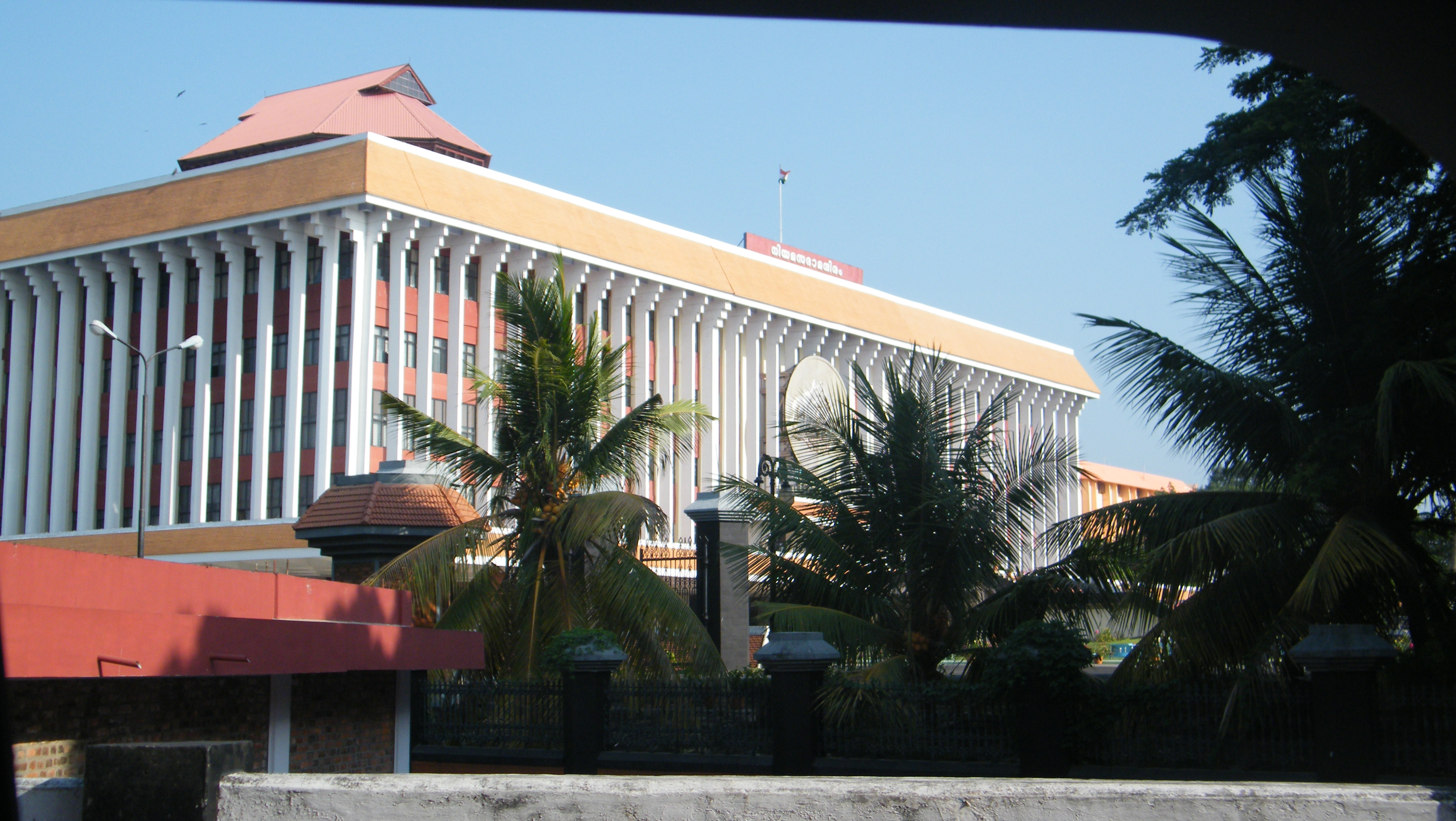
- The side view of Niyamasabha Complex

- Location within Kerala Location within India

General information
- Type: Legislative building
- Architectural style: Kerala Architecture
- Location: Palayam, Thiruvananthapuram, Kerala, India
- Coordinates: 8.5067°N 76.9487°E
- Construction started: 1979
- Completed: 1998
- Owner: Government of Kerala

Height
- Height: 200 feet (61 m)

Technical details
- Floor count: 5+1 basement
- Floor area: 802,453 square feet (74,550.3 m^{2})

Design and construction
- Architect: KPWD
- Civil engineer: KPWD
- Main contractor: Kerala State Construction Corporation

The Niyamasabha Mandiram, located in Palayam, Thiruvananthapuram, is the seat of the Kerala State Legislative Assembly or the Niyamasabha. Built primarily in the classical style of Architecture of Kerala, with strong influences of many contemporary styles, it is a structure with grand staircase, gardens, water bodies and a large Central Assembly Hall. Located in a high security zone, the complex accommodates the residence of the Speaker of the Niyamasabha, legislature offices of all MLAs and offices of independent commissions and bodies. The assembly was opened on 22 May 1998, by the President of India, K. R. Narayanan.

== History ==
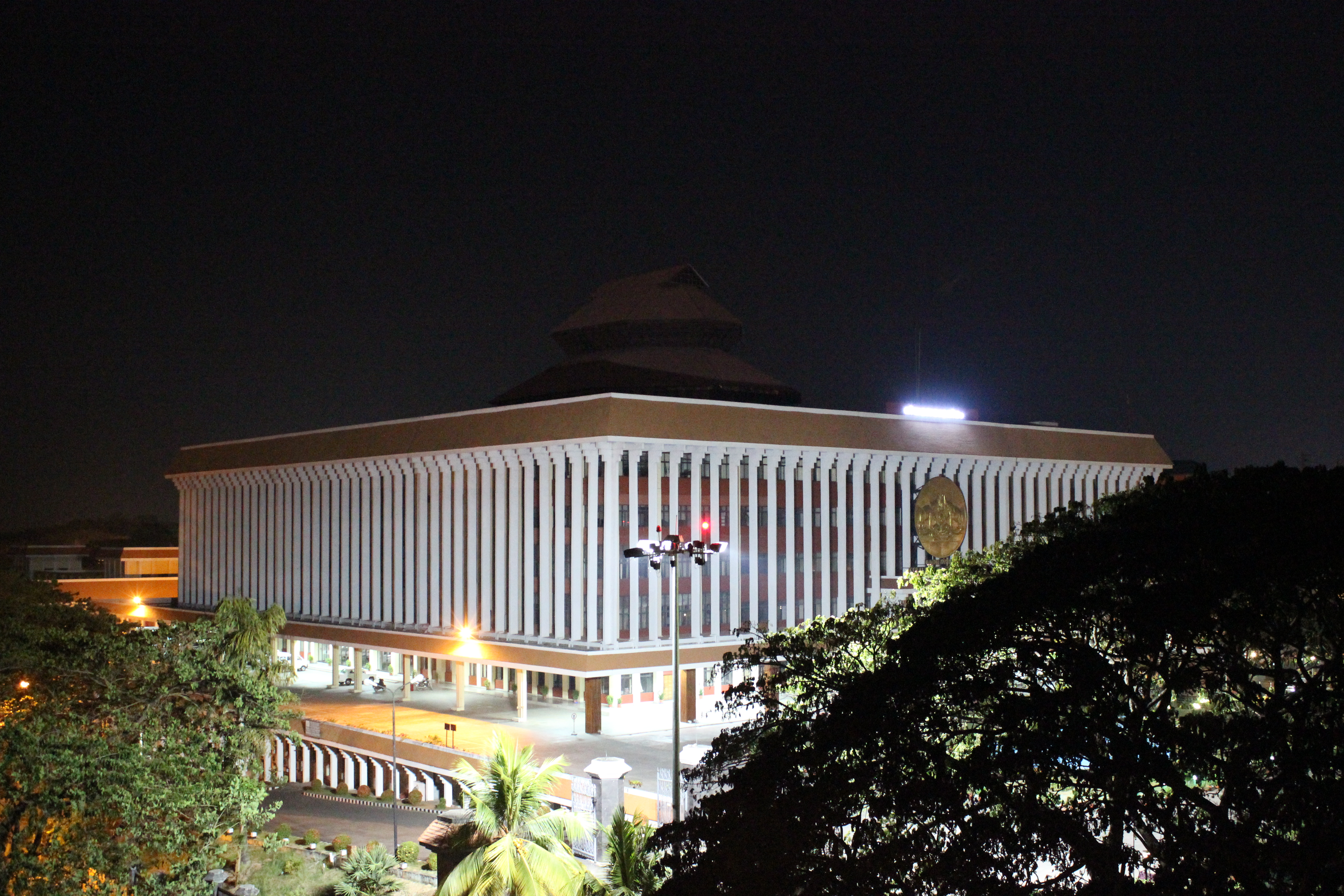
Kerala State Legislative Assembly or the Niyamasabha in night

The Niyamasabha or Legislature of the State of Kerala was initially located in the Government Secretariat Complex from 12 December 1933 as the chambers of the Sree Moolam Popular Assembly and the Sri Chitra State Council, during the days of the Kingdom of Travancore. Post independence, the Assembly Hall became the seat of the legislature of the newly formed Travancore-Cochin state, and later, that of the state of Kerala in 1956, after its formation. Due to the increased number of seats in the legislature of Kerala, space became a major constraint – especially in the 1970s. In addition, space crunch was reported in the public galleries once the Assembly was opened to the general public to view the assembly proceedings. It was then decided to construct a new complex dedicated for the Assembly. In 1979, Neelam Sanjeeva Reddy, the then President of India, laid the foundation of the new complex.

The site chosen was Government Estate at Palayam, in heart of Thiruvananthapuram city, which was once the headquarters of the Nair Brigade of the Travancorean army. The old Army Headquarters was converted into the Legislature Museum.

=== Interiors ===
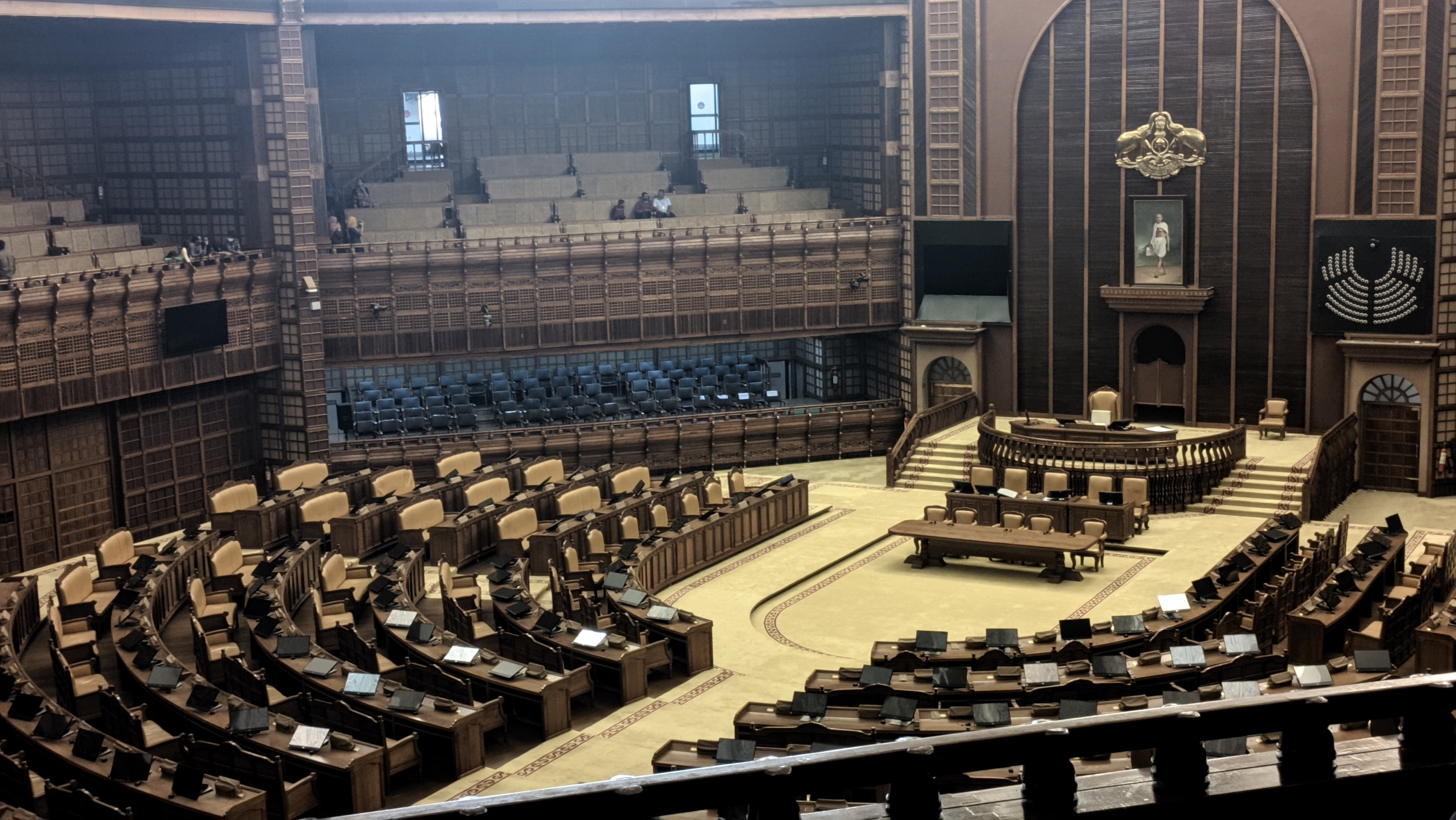
The Central Assembly Hall

The Niyamasabha Mandiram has 5 stories including ground floor and a basement meant for the parking of official cars. Leading to the foyer on the first floor, is a flight of 51 stairs, more than 200 feet (61 m) wide.

The entire structure is a large square with four frontages with each being supported by 40 pillars. The main entrance faces west. The West frontage has a large circular copper plate, with the Seal of Kerala inscribed on it. The foyer opens to the Central Assembly Hall, which is adorned with ornate panelling in teak and rosewood. The Central Hall is 95 feet high and has 8 galleries, which can accommodate a total of 800 people, and a Media Box. The Central Hall has 140 seats set in an amphitheatre style with a grand podium for the Speaker and 3 sets of jury tables for the Executive Staff. The background wall houses a large portrait of Mahatma Gandhi. There are microphones and electronic voting systems provided to each of the 140 seats. The central hall is lit up using 1 kW Metal Halide floodlights.

There is a large veranda, which encircles the entire structure equally. On its east side, the complex is connected to the Administrative Complex through a corridor, which houses the offices of all legislature and other independent commissions. The dome is built in traditional Kerala Koothambalam style.

The Niyamasabha Mandiram houses the following offices, apart from the Central Assembly Hall:

- The Chamber of the Speaker
- The Office of Chief of House (Chief Minister)
- The Office of Opposition Leader
- The Office of Chief Curator
- The Office of Chief of Watch & Wards
- Media Room
- Press and Information Centre
- Conference room

Apart from this, there is a large canteen and kitchen facility, located at ground floor and a large parking space at the basement, which can accommodate 400 cars.

=== Exteriors ===
There are 2 large gardens; the South Garden houses memorials of several famous leaders and veteran legislators of the past. The North Garden has several water features.

==== Statues ====
- A large statue of Mahatma Gandhi, located in front of Grand Staircase, in meditating pose
- A statue of Jawaharlal Nehru on right side of Grand Staircase
- A statue of B. R. Ambedkar on left side of Grand Staircase
- A bust of K R Narayanan at the lower entrance

=== Administrative Office ===
The 230,000 sq ft (21,000 m^{2}) administrative office complex houses individual offices of each MLA, apart from few office spaces for semi-judicial and legislative commissions. The Office of the Lokayukta of Kerala is located in the Administrative office complex.

== Legislature Library ==
The Administrative Block is the home of the 120-year-old Kerala Legislature Library, now having more than 100,000 titles and political reference books, original copies of various statutes and acts and other legal references, for the reference of MLAs and research scholars. Admission is provided to former Members and officers of the legislature secretariat as well. The Library preserves the entire proceedings of the House since 1888 and makes available the digitised versions of the proceedings and the text of all bills passed by the Niyamasabha since 1957 on its website. Furthermore, there are plans to digitise all Legislative Committee Reports and Enquiry Commission Reports ever tabled in the House and make them available online.

=== Training Centre ===
The Niyamasabha Training Centre (NCT) is located in the Administrative complex, which provides various short and long term courses for legislators of the state as well as their counterparts from other states and nations. The training centre conducts annual programmes for all its legislators apart from special orientation programmes for first time legislators. All state legislators are given primary training on various legal frameworks, important state and national statutes, the Constitution as well as computer training. Trainings are imparted on legislative skills and effective debating. In addition, regular training programmes are conducted for government officials related to the legislature, especially related to drafting various statutes and acts of Niyamasabha. Media and press officials are also given training in effective reporting of Niyamasabha proceedings. Apart from this, the NCT is an authorised centre for training legislators and officials of the Maldives's People Majlis. In the past interns from other Indian states, Sri Lanka, SAARC and Canada have trained at the NCT. The Bureau of Parliamentary Studies and Training (BPST), New Delhi and the Institute of Management in Government, Kerala (IMG) have chosen NCT as a centre for their programmes.

== Legislature Museum ==
The Niyamasabha maintains 2 museums for promoting legislative awareness among public. The old Travancore Army headquarters, located inside the Niyamasabha campus, has been converted into a full-fledged Legislature museum displaying various photos and other objects & artefacts that shows the growth of the legislature in Kerala. This building is located within the Niyamasabha complex, but is separate from the Niyamasabha Mandiram. The old assembly hall inside the Secretariat was converted to legislature museum where mock assemblies are conducted to train students about legislature process along with a photo gallery.

== Security ==
From the days of the Monarchy, the state police is not allowed to enter the premises of the legislature. This is done primarily to maintain the independence of the legislature from the executive – which includes police department – as the latter is answerable to the state government.

Due to this reason, the protection and security of the house is maintained by a specialised force, known as the Watch and Ward. The Watch and Ward consists of 220 watch wardens with 5 Chief Wardens, who directly reports to the Niyamasabha Privileges Committee and the Speaker. The Watch and Ward is also responsible for maintaining sanity of the Niyamasabha and is empowered to arrest and remove any individual, including any MLA, upon the orders of the Speaker, on account of unacceptable behaviour or violation of assembly laws.

The house is under the control of the Legislature Secretary, who is also known as the Chief Curator and is responsible for passing executive orders on behalf of the Speaker as well as exercising executive authority over legislature staff and premises. The Legislature Secretary has the powers of an executive magistrate and has the rank of a Cabinet Secretary, as per state protocols.

== Other structures ==
The Niyamasabha campus has few other structures apart from the Niyamasabha Mandiram (the main complex) and the museum.

- Neethi: The official residence of the Speaker of the Niyamasabha is located on the North side of the complex. As the Speaker has a rank of a cabinet minister, the residence has its own camp office and quarters for the private staff of the Speaker. The security of the residence is vested with the Watch and Ward.
- Hanuman Temple is a popular Hanuman temple, located near Niyamasabha Campus, which was one of the official temples of the Mounted Cavalry of the Nair Brigade.
- MLA Hostel: The Niyamasabha Secretariat maintains a hostel for MLAs located 400 meters away from the Niyamasabha campus, for the accommodation of all the MLAs. The MLA Hostel provides single and family room accommodation to all its members along with a few guest rooms for visiting parliamentary guests. The MLA hostel has its own canteen run by the Indian Coffee House and a business centre.
