= Thalolam (scheme) =

Social security scheme for children in Kerala

Thalolam Scheme is an initiative under the Kerala Social Security Mission by the Social Justice Department, Kerala. It was launched on 1 January 2010 to provide free treatment for children below the age of 18 suffering from chronic diseases such as chronic kidney disease, cardiovascular diseases, cerebral palsy, brittle bone disease, hemophilia, thalassemia, sickle cell anemia, orthopedic deformities, congenital anomalies, neurodevelopmental disabilities and accidents needing surgery. In 2019, ₹ 2 crores were allocated for this project.

== Beneficiaries ==
The beneficiaries of this scheme are children from families categorized as below the poverty line and residing in Kerala. Each eligible individual will be given initial assistance of ₹50,000 under this scheme.
