= Department of Environment (Kerala) =

Government department of Kerala, India

Department of Environment Government of Kerala

Department overview
- Formed: 2006
- Headquarters: Government Secretariat, Thiruvananthapuram
- Ministers responsible: V.D. Satheesan, Minister for Pollution control; Sunny Joseph, Minister for Environment
- Department executives: Seeram Sambasiva Rao IAS, Special Secretary (Environment); Suneel Pamidi IFS, Director
- Child agencies: Kerala State Pollution Control Board; Kerala State Biodiversity Board
- Website: envt.kerala.gov.in

The Department of Environment is an administrative department of the Government of Kerala. The Environment Department is responsible for formulating and implementing policies related to the environment and climate change. Its headquarters is located in the Government Secretariat, Thiruvananthapuram.

== History ==
The Environment Department was created in 2006 when the subject of environment was separated from the then Science, Technology and Environment Department.

The Directorate of Environment and Climate Change (DoECC) was later set up in December 2010. As the key agency of the department, the Directorate is responsible for planning, coordinating and guiding the implementation of environmental conservation policies and programmes of both the Central and State Governments. It is also the designated body for developing and carrying out initiatives related to climate change.

== Leadership ==
The Environment Department is headed by a Cabinet Minister of the Government. The current Minister for Environment and Climate Change is Sunny Joseph.

The department is administratively headed by the Secretary to Government (Environment), an IAS officer, who is supported by Additional Secretaries, Joint Secretaries, Deputy Secretaries, Under Secretaries and other staff.

The Directorate of Environment and Climate Change, the nodal agency of the department responsible for implementation, is headed by a Director appointed by the Government. The Director of Environment is an IFS officer, and incumbent director is Suneel Pamidi I.F.S.

== Functions ==
- Administration of the nodal departments such as Directorate of Environment and Climate Change
- Administration of all Acts and Rules relating to environmental protection and climate change.
- Administration of climate change and allied matters.
- River conservation programmes
- Environmental awards
- Environmental research and development
- Environment information system
- Coordination of the environment- and climate-related activities of government departments, agencies, institutions and local bodies across the State.

== Directorate of Environment and Climate Change ==
The Directorate is the principal functional wing of the department and is headquartered in Pettah, Thiruvananthapuram. It is headed by the Director of Environment and Climate Change, an Indian Forest Service (IFS) officer, who is supported by both technical and administrative staff.

The technical cadre includes Environmental Scientists, Environment Programme Managers and Environment Engineers, assisted by Environment Officers and Assistant Environment Officers.

The administrative staff includes the Administrative Officer and the Finance Officer.

== Institutions and agencies ==
- Directorate of Environment and Climate Change, Pettah, Thiruvananthapuram
- Kerala State Pollution Control Board
- The Kerala State Biodiversity Board
- Kerala Coastal Zone Management Authority (KCZMA)
- State Wetland Authority of Kerala

== See also ==
- Department of Forests and Wildlife (Kerala)
- List of departments and agencies of the Government of Kerala
- Environment of India
