= Vayomithram project =

Healthcare scheme for senior citizens in Kerala

Vayomithram Project is an initiative by the Kerala Social Security Mission launched in 2010-11, aimed at providing comprehensive healthcare and support services to senior citizens aged 65 and above. The three main features of this project are mobile clinics, palliative care and help desk for the elderly. This project is aimed at elderly individuals living in municipality/corporation areas in Kerala.

== Activities ==
- Mobile clinic services: Under the Vayomithram program, mobile clinics staffed by a medical officer, staff nurse and junior public health nurse function provide healthcare assistance and free medicines to the elderly. Dementia is one of the main health conditions covered under this program.
- Palliative care services: Palliative care services are provided for bedridden and terminally ill elderly individuals.
- Other services: Activities such as special medical camps (for eye checkup), entertainment programmes, collaboration with NGOs, counseling services, rehabilitation etc also fall under this program.
