= Department of Disaster Management =

Government department in Kerala

- Logo of the Government of Kerala

Department overview
- Jurisdiction: Government of Kerala
- Headquarters: Government Secretariat, Thiruvananthapuram, Kerala, India
- Minister responsible: V.D. Satheesan, Minister for Disaster Management
- Department executive: Jeevan Babu, IAS, Special Secretary to Government, Disaster Management
- Parent department: Government of Kerala
- Child Department: Kerala State Disaster Management Authority
- Website: sdma.kerala.gov.in

The Disaster Management Department is an administrative department of the Government of Kerala. It is responsible for disaster management policy, coordination, preparedness, response, and risk reduction in Kerala. It has its headquarters in Kerala Government Secretariat, Thiruvananthapuram.

== Leadership ==
The department is headed by the Minister for Disaster Management, a member of the Kerala Council of Ministers. The administrative head of the department is the Secretary to Government, Disaster Management Department, who is responsible for the department's day-to-day administration and implementation of government policies.

As of 2026, the portfolio of Disaster Management is held by V. D. Satheesan, the Chief Minister of Kerala.

== Functions ==
The department is responsible for:

- Disaster management policy and coordination.
- Relief and rehabilitation measures arising from natural calamities.
- Administration of the State Disaster Response Fund (SDRF) and other disaster relief funds.
- Financial assistance and relief grants related to disasters.
- Coordination of preparedness, emergency response, and recovery measures.
- Administrative support for the Kerala State Disaster Management Authority (KSDMA) and the State Emergency Operations Centre (SEOC).
- Restoration of public infrastructure damaged by natural disasters.

== See also ==
- Kerala State Disaster Management Authority
- National Disaster Management Authority (India)
- Government of Kerala
