= Operation Sulaimani =

Free food programme in India

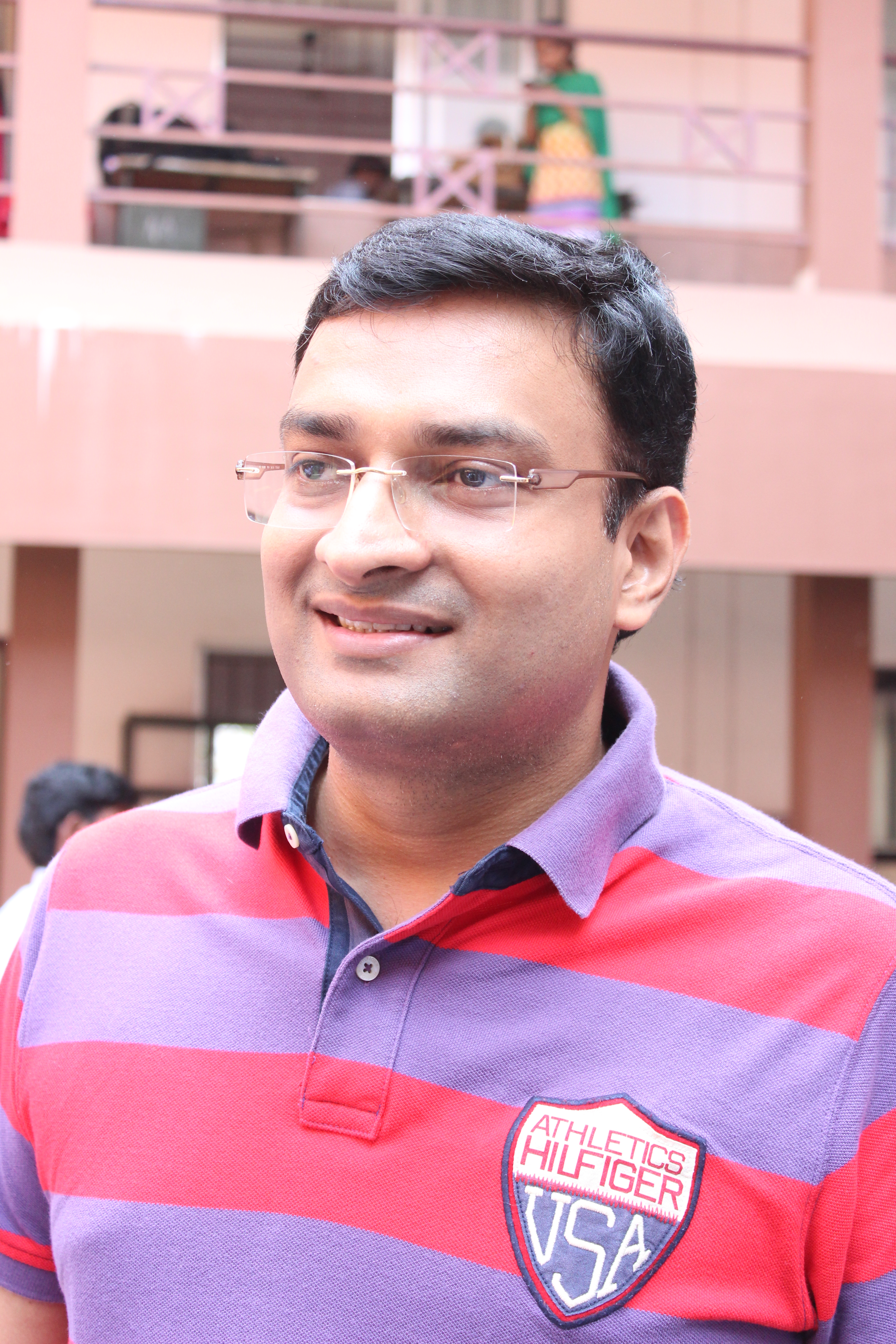
Prasanth Nair IAS is the person behind Operation Sulaimani.

Operation Sulaimani is a free food programme introduced in the city of Kozhikode, India, by the district administration and Kerala Hotel and Restaurants Association. It is meant to enable those who cannot afford a meal to have food with dignity and to avoid food waste.

== Programme ==
The program is named after Sulaimani, a popular drink in Malabar, made from black tea, cardamom and lemon juice. The idea of Operation Sulaimani is inspired by the Malayalam movie Ustad Hotel where the protagonist, a hotel owner in Kozhikode, feeds the hungry from his earnings. Operation Sulaimani ensures that no one in Kozhikode is denied food on account of an empty or lost wallet. It guarantees a right to food without answering any questions or long delays.

Operation Sulaimani was introduced by Prasanth Nair IAS, the then District collector of Kozhikode. In his own words "Operation Sulaimani is modelled on a system existing in western countries such as Coffee-on-Wall and Food-on-the-Wall, where you pay for an extra meal or coffee".

== Operation ==
Anyone can collect a Sulaimani Coupon from one of the authorised distribution centres. Food coupons are distributed at local village and taluk offices and at select hostels at railway station and bus stands. These can be exchanged for a meal in one of the hundred or so partner restaurants. A donation box is kept at these restaurants for the public to contribute to the programme. Any loss of revenue incurred by participating restaurants are compensated through the system where they match the coupons collected by each restaurant and distribution centre.

There are now more than 25 coupon distribution centres in 14 zones of Kozhikode district. As of May 2016, around 10,000 meals were served through Operation Sulaimani.

== See also ==
- Kozhikode
