= Department of Agriculture Development & Farmers' Welfare (Kerala) =

Government department of Kerala, India

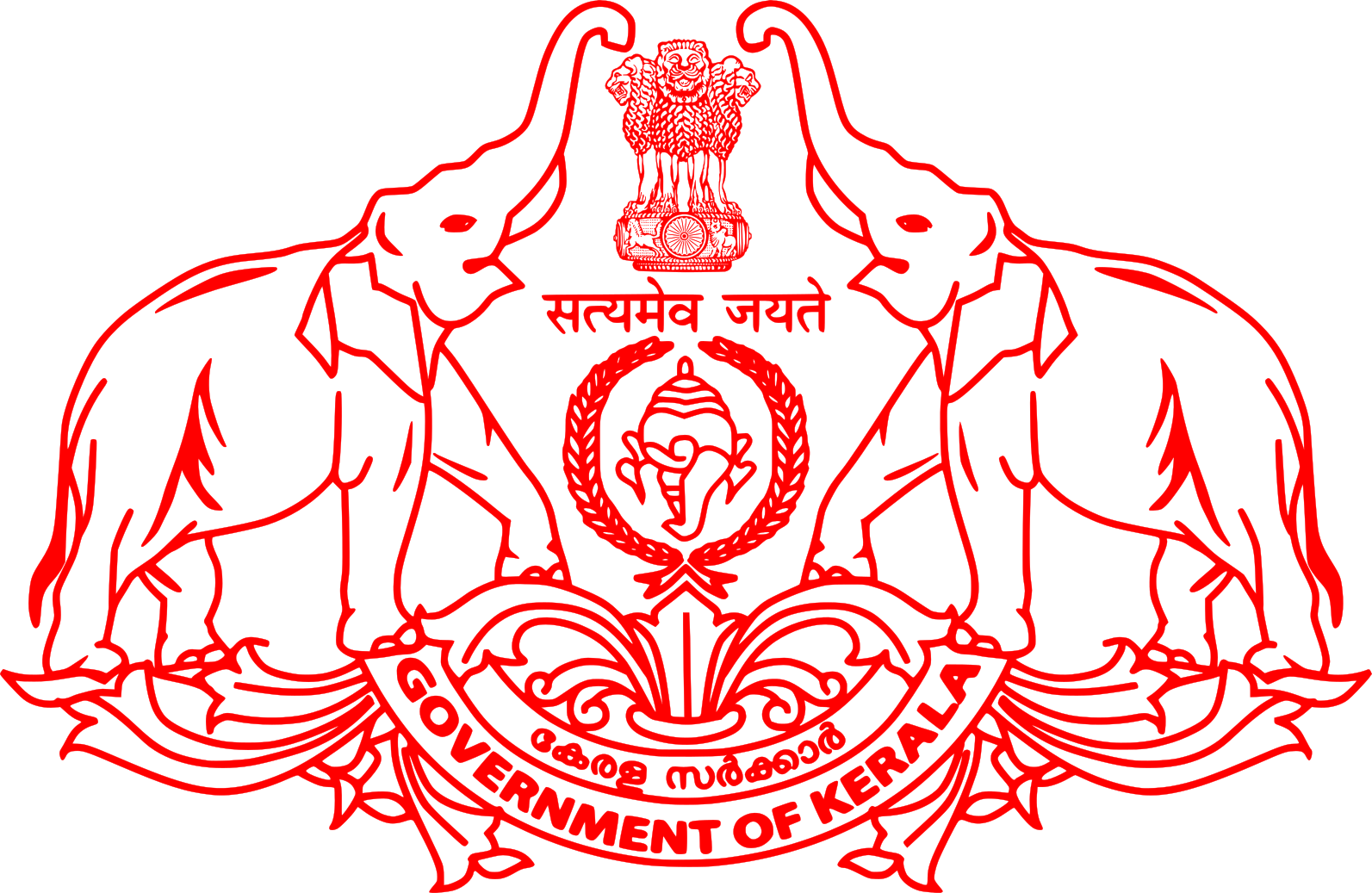

Agency overview
- Formed: 1956
- Superseding agencies: Department of Animal Husbandry; Department of Dairy Development
- Jurisdiction: Kerala
- Headquarters: Thiruvananthapuram
- Annual budget: ₹3,457.09 crore (US$360 million) (2026–27, revised)
- Ministers responsible: T. Siddique, Minister for Agriculture; Bindhu Krishna, Minister for Animal Husbandry and Dairy Development
- Agency executives: Dr.B Ashok IAS, Principal Secretary and Agriculture Production Commissioner; vacant, Secretary Agriculture; Dr. Sriram Venkitaraman IAS, Director of Agriculture
- Parent agency: Government of Kerala
- Child agencies: Agriculture (Establishment - A) Department; Agriculture (Establishment - B) Department; Agriculture (planning - A) Department; Agriculture (planning - B) Department; Agriculture (NCA) Department; Agriculture (Farms) Department; Agriculture (P U) Department; Agriculture (Agri.) Department; Agriculture (IFA) Department; Agriculture (PPM cell) Department; Agriculture (PS) Department; Agriculture (WTO Cell) Department; Agriculture Development & Farmers' Welfare (Dairy) Department; Agriculture Development & Farmers' Welfare (AHE) Department; Agriculture Development & Farmers' Welfare (AHF) Department; Agriculture Development & Farmers' Welfare (AHG) Department
- Website: http://www.keralaagriculture.gov.in

The Department of Agriculture Development & Farmers' Welfare (Kerala) is one of the Department of Government of Kerala. The Department of Agriculture Development & Farmers' Welfare is a key ministry that manages the agriculture development through promoting scientific methods of cultivation and welfare of farmers of State of Kerala through various policies and programmes. The department is headed by a senior minister who has cabinet ranking as per Indian Cabinet Protocol Laws.

== Leadership ==
The Agriculture Department functions under the Minister for Agriculture, who serves as the political head of the department. Administratively, the department is headed by the Principal Secretary and Agricultural Production Commissioner, who is assisted by a Special Secretary, Additional Secretaries, and other officers and staff at the Secretariat.
The incumbent Minister for Agriculture is T. Siddique, while Minhaj Alam, IAS, serves as the Principal Secretary and Agricultural Production Commissioner.

== Line Departments / Field Agencies ==
Line Departments

- Directorate of Agriculture, Thiruvananthapuram
- Soil Survey & Soil Conservation Directorate, Thiruvananthapuram

Allied institutions

- Kerala Farmers Cooperative Federation Limited
- State Warehousing Corporation, Ernakulam
- Agency for Development of Aquaculture, Thiruvananthapuram
- Kerala State Land Use Board
- Kerala Agro Machinery Corporation Limited
- Kerala Agricultural University
- Kerala State Palmyra Products Development and Workers Welfare Corporation Limited
- Kerala State Medicinal Plant Board
- Kerala Land Development Corporation Limited
- Rehabilitation Plantation Limited.
- State Farming Corporation of Kerala
- Registration and Licensing of Fishing Craft
- Kissan Kerala
- Rubber Mark
- Areca Nut and Spices Development Directorate (DASD)
- Cashew Nut and Cocoa Development Directorate
- Kerala Agro Industries Corporation Limited
- Kerala Agro Machinery Corporation Limited
- Kerala State Warehousing Corporation
- Plantation Corporation of Kerala
- Small Farmers Agri Business Consortium
- Vegetable and Fruit Promotion Council Keralam
- Farm Information Bureau, Kerala
