= Kerala State Pollution Control Board =

Indian pollution control agency

Agency overview
- Formed: September 12, 1974; 51 years ago
- Jurisdiction: Government of Kerala
- Headquarters: Thiruvananthapuram, Kerala, India
- Ministers responsible: V.D. Satheesan, Chief Minister of Kerala and Minister for Pollution Control; Sunny Joseph, Minister for Environment
- Agency executives: S. Sreekala, Chairman; Dr. Ratish Menon, Member Secretary
- Parent agency: Department of Environment, Government of Kerala
- Website: https://kspcb.kerala.gov.in

The Kerala State Pollution Control Board is a body of the Department of Environment, Government of the State of Kerala, India. The board is charged with enforcing laws related to environmental protection. The Pollution Control Board has been established as a regulatory authority for implementing various pollution control laws. The board is committed to provide pollution free environment to the people of state. The Board has undertaken various studies of underground water, solid and air to take remedial steps to control pollution.

== See also ==
- Awaaz Foundation Non-governmental organisation in India, works towards preserving and enhancing environment and for other socially oriented causes.
- List of Kerala State Government Organisations
