= Pettah, Thiruvananthapuram =

Pettah
- Urban Neighbourhood
- Location in Kerala, India
- Coordinates: 8°29′42″N 76°55′45″E
- Country: India
- State: Kerala
- District: Thiruvananthapuram

Languages
  - Official: Malayalam, English
- Time zone: UTC+5:30 (IST)
- PIN: 695024
- Telephone code: 0471
- Vehicle registration: KL-01

Pettah is an urban neighbourhood of Thiruvananthapuram, the capital of the Indian state of Kerala. Strategically located near the Thiruvananthapuram International Airport and along the main road connecting key city areas, Pettah has historically served as a gateway to the city. Its proximity to the renowned Padmanabhaswamy Temple made it a favored destination for traders and pilgrims alike.

== Location ==
Pettah is on the way to Thiruvananthapuram International Airport and Shanghumugham Beach. Private and KSRTC buses connect Pettah to most parts of the city.

The railway station at Pettah is 3 km from Thiruvananthapuram Central railway station.

Thiruvananthapuram International Airport International Terminal is around 2 km away.

== Prominent institutions ==
- Railway Hospital
- Kerala Kaumudi Buildings
- Pettah Juma Masjid
- Tourist villages
- Hospitals - Lords, KIMS, Ananthapuri
- Temples - Puthen Kovil, Kanjiravilakom, Kaniyattiamman Kovil
- St. Anne's Church

== Notable people ==
- Palpu
