= Department of Labour and Skills (Kerala) =

Labour welfare and skill development department in Kerala

Department overview
- Jurisdiction: Kerala, India
- Headquarters: Secretariat, Thiruvananthapuram
- Ministers responsible: Bindhu Krishna, Minister for Labour; Shibu Baby John, Minister for Skill Development
- Department executive: S. Shanavas IAS, Secretary to Government (Labour and Skills)
- Parent department: Government of Kerala
- Child agencies: Commissionerate of Labour; Department of Factories and Boilers
- Website: lc.kerala.gov.in

The Department of Labour and Skills is an administrative department of the Government of Kerala.

The department is responsible for formulating and implementing policies aimed at the welfare of labour, skills development and employment. Its headquarters is located in Thiruvananthapuram, Kerala. The department is headed by the Minister for Labour and the Minister for Skill Development.

== History ==
Earlier, formation of the Labour Department was initiated by Diwan Sir C. P. Ramaswamy Iyer. Until then, the labour department was functioning as part of the Industrial Department. Maharaja, Sri Chithira Thirunal Balarama Varma accorded sanction to the creation of the post of the Labour Commissioner as per the letter No.154 dated 26 January 1946. Since then the Labour Department started functioning as an independent department.

== Leadership ==
The Department of Labour and Skills is headed by Cabinet Ministers of the Government of Kerala, and the incumbent Minister for Labour is Bindhu Krishna, and Minister for Skills Development is Shibu Baby John.

Administratively, the department is headed by a Secretary to Government, an IAS officer. The Secretary is supported by Additional Secretaries, Deputy Secretaries, Under Secretaries, and other officers posted in the Secretariat.

The operational structure of the department includes:

- Directorate of Employment and Training
- Directorate of Factories and Boilers
- Labour Commissionerate

== Sub-divisions ==
=== Directorates / Field Departments ===
==== Labour Commissionerate ====
The Labour Commissionerate is the main operational wing of the department, headed by a Labour Commissioner. The Labour Commissioner is an IAS cadre officer who functions as the head of department. The incumbent Labour Commissioner is Safna Nazarudeen IAS. There are three regional labour offices; Kollam, Eranakulam and Kozhikode, headed by Regional Joint Labour Commissioners. At the district level there are District Labour Offices, headed by District Labour Officers (DLOs).

==== Directorate of Employment and Training ====
The Directorate of Employment is headed by a Director, an IAS cadre officer. It has its headquarters in Thiruvananthapuram. The Employment Services department has a primary objective of providing an interface between the employers and the job seekers. The directorate manages and andminster employment exchange offices in the state. The current employment director is Sufyan Ahmed IAS.

==== Directorate of Factories and Boilers ====
The Factories & Boilers Department is responsible for ensuring the safety, health and welfare of workers working in industrial establishments. The Director of Factories & Boilers is the head of the department. The current Director of Factories and Boilers is P. Pramod. The main responsibility of the department is to ensure compliance with the Factories Act, 1948 and the Indian Boiler Act, 1923, which were framed to ensure the safety, health and welfare of workers working in industrial establishments and the general public living near industrial establishments. To facilitate the functioning of the department, the state has been divided into three zones, 22 factory divisions and 25 additional factory divisions.

== Welfare fund boards ==
Sl. No.	Name of Welfare Fund Board
1	Kerala Abkari Workers' Welfare Fund Board
2	Kerala Agricultural Workers' Welfare Fund Board (http://www.agriworkersfund.org/)
3	Kerala Beedi & Cigar Workers' Welfare Fund Board
4	Kerala Building & Other Construction Workers' Welfare Board
5	Kerala Cashew Worker's Relief & Welfare Fund Board
6	Kerala Handloom Workers' Welfare Fund Board
7	Kerala Headload Workers' Welfare Fund Board
8	Kerala Labour Welfare Fund Board
9	Kerala Motor Transport Workers' Welfare Fund Board (http://kmtwwfb.org/index.php)
10	Kerala Shops & Commercial Establishments Workers Welfare Fund Board (http://103.10.168.4/peedika/web/index.php)
11	Kerala Tailoring Workers' Welfare Fund Board (http://tailorwelfare.in/)
12	Kerala Toddy Workers' Welfare Fund Board
13	Kerala Eetta, Kattuvally and Pandanus Leaf Workers' Welfare Fund Board
14	Kerala Small Plantation Workers' Welfare Fund Board
15	Kerala Jewellery Workers' Welfare Fund Board
16	Kerala Unorganised Workers' Social Security Board
