= Department of Sports and Youth Affairs (Kerala) =

Kerala government department

Department overview
- Jurisdiction: India Kerala
- Headquarters: Thiruvananthapuram, Kerala
- Annual budget: ₹243.2993 crore (US$25 million) (2026–27, revised)
- Minister responsible: O. J. Janeesh, Minister for Sports and Youth Affairs
- Department executives: Prashant Nair IAS, Secretary to Government; Vishnuraj P, IAS, Director of Sports and Youth Affairs
- Parent department: Government of Kerala
- Website: dsya.kerala.gov.in

The Department of Sports and Youth Affairs is an administrative department of the Government of Kerala. The department is responsible for development and administration of sports infrastructure, development of sportspersons and administration of youth welfare projects.

== Leadership ==
The Sports and Youth Affairs Department is headed by a Cabinet Minister of the Government of Kerala. The incumbent Minister for Sports and Youth Affairs is O. J. Janeesh .

The department is administratively headed by a Secretary to Government, an IAS Officer. The Secretary is assisted by Additional Secretaries, Joint Secretaries, Deputy Secretaries, Under Secretaries, and Section Officers at the Government Secretariat.

  - Administration and functioning of the Kerala State Sports Council.
  - Management and development of Sports Schools and Sports Hostels.
  - Grant of pension to indigent sports persons and circus artists.
  - Promotion and development of Kalaripayattu.
- Youth Affairs
  - Promotion of youth activities and youth welfare programmes, including youth festivals, youth clubs, and the National Physical Efficiency Drive.
  - Matters relating to the School Athletic Association and the National Physical Efficiency Drive.
  - Administration and functioning of the Kerala Aviation Training Centre.

== Line departments ==
Directorate of Sports and Youth Affairs

The Directorate of Sports and Youth Affairs (DSYA) is the nodal agency responsible for promoting sports, physical education, and youth welfare in the state. Established in 1986, it develops sports infrastructure, implements sports development programmes, and supports initiatives to improve sporting excellence and youth development. It has its headquarters in Thiruvananthapuram, and headed by a Director, an IAS cadre officer. The Director is assisted by an additional director, and other ministerial staffs. There are two regional offices, headed by deputy directors, one at Kozhikode and other at Ernakulam. There are assistant engineers for each regional office. The following institutions functions under the directorate;

- Rajiv Gandhi Sports Medicine Center, Thiruvananthapuram -
- Jimmy George Indoor Stadium, Thiruvananthapuram -

== Autonomous Organizations ==
- Kerala State Youth Commission
- Kerala State Sports Council
- Kerala State Youth Welfare Board
