= Nava Kerala Sadas =

Movement by the Government of Kerala

Nava Kerala Sadas 2023
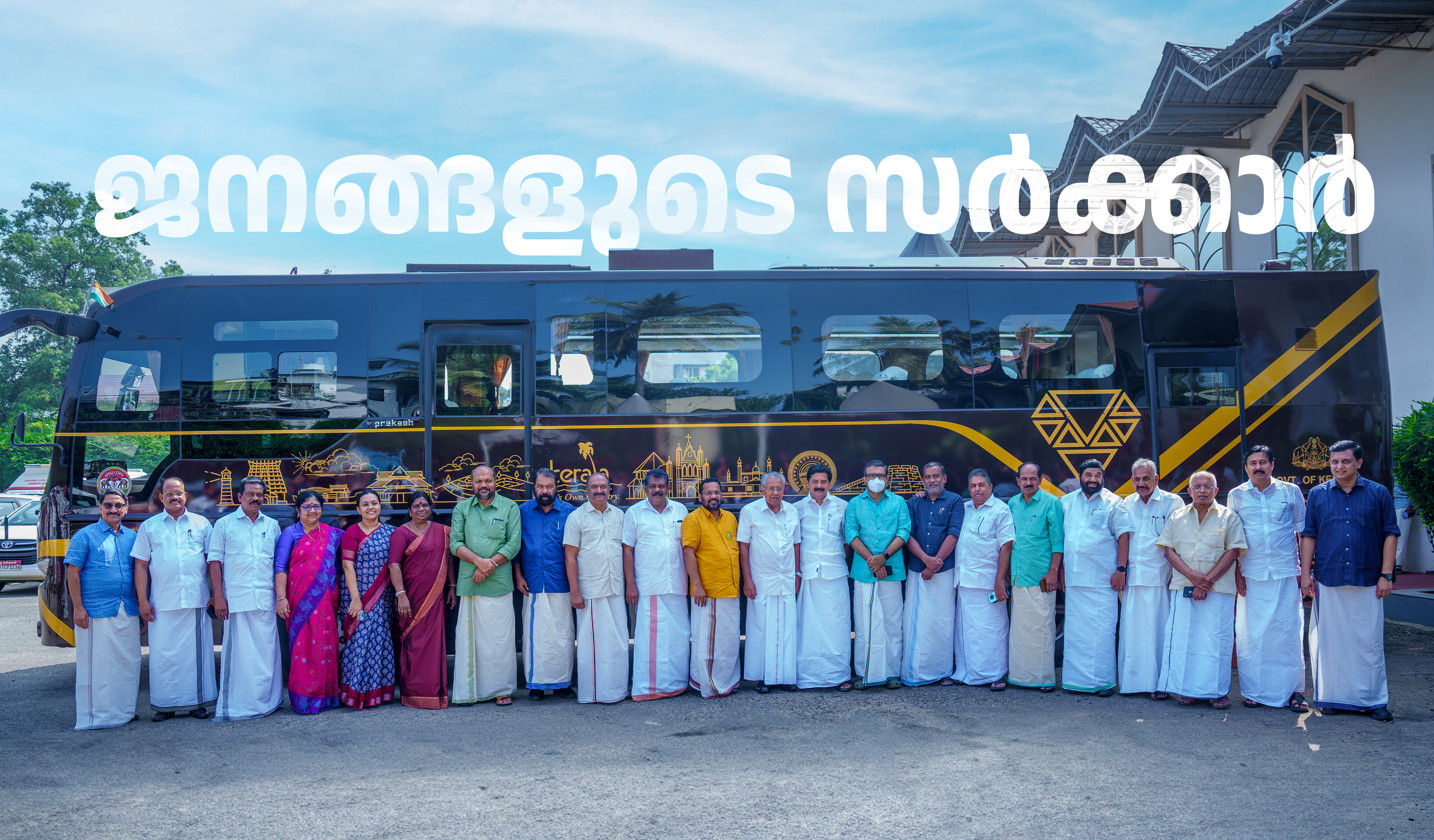
- Kerala Chief Minister Pinarayi Vijayan and council of ministers in front of Nava Kerala bus
- Date: 18 November 2023 – 24 December 2023
- Location: Kerala, India
- Type: Road Show, Public Outreach Programme
- Theme: Political movement, social movement
- Cause: Publicising the Kerala State (LDF) government’s achievements
- Motive: a major link between the government and the citizens, as their opinions on various issues would help in formulating the path ahead for the creation of a new Kerala
- Organized by: Left Democratic Front, Pinarayi Vijayan
- Participants: Politicians, citizens, civil society organisations, political activists
- Website: nkp.kerala.gov.in

Nava Kerala Sadas was the outreach programme of the Kerala government, where the chief minister and ministers travelled through all assembly constituencies of the state. (lit: Kerala Janakiya Mantri Sabha, with the people) was a mass movement which was held by the Left Democratic Front (the LDF as short form), senior LDF leader and Kerala Chief Minister Pinarayi Vijayan to encourage the public to join hands with Government from Manjeswaram to Thiruvananthapuram, a journey of 589 kilometres (365 miles) over almost 36 days 140 Assembly constituencies.

== Aims and objectives of Nava Kerala Sadas ==
It aims to highlight the achievements of the LDF government so far, plans for a bright future for the state of Kerala. Pinarayi Vijayan and his group of ministers toured 140 assembly constituencies.

== Timeline ==
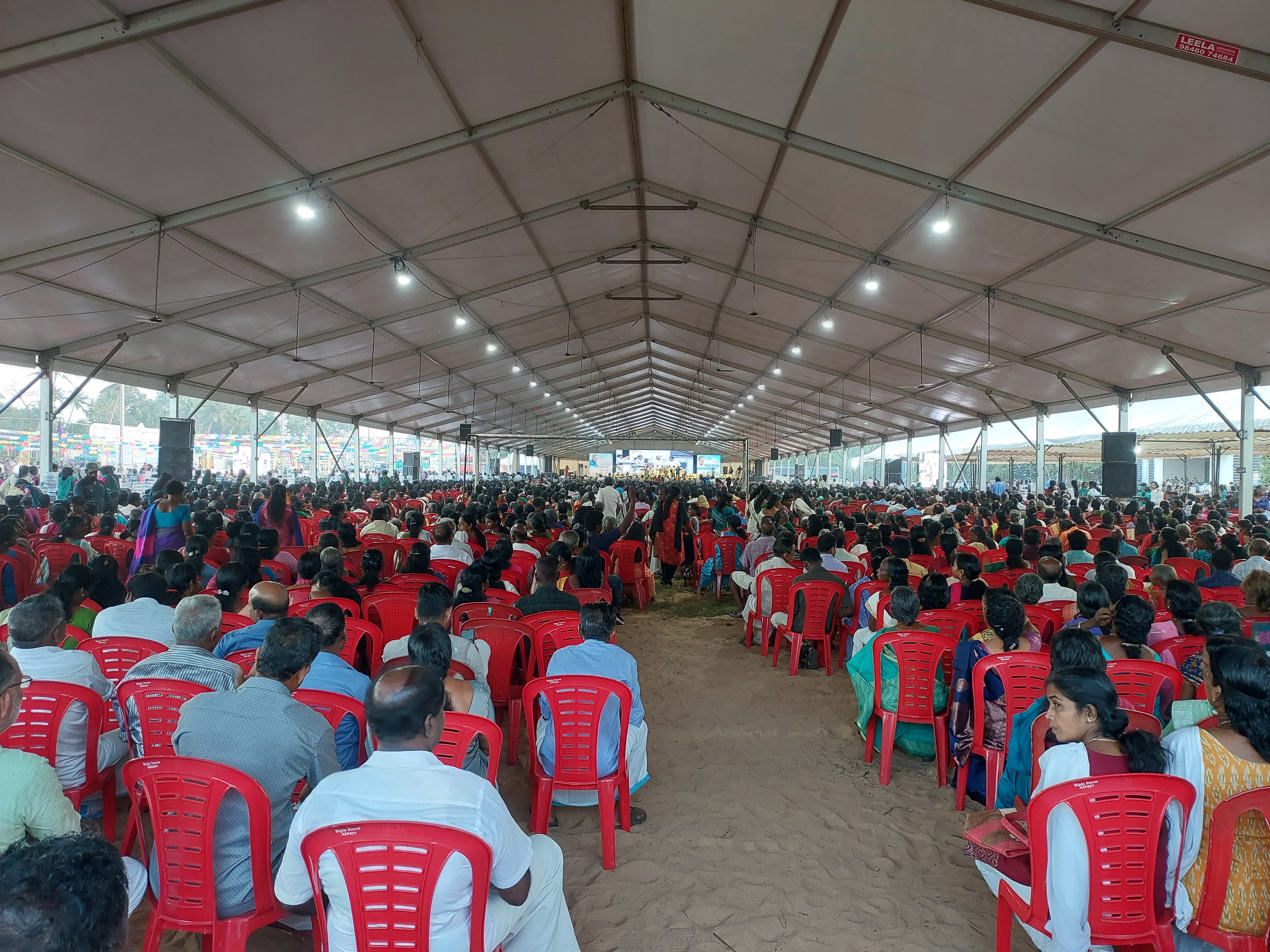
Nava Kerala Sadas at Cherthala, Alappuzha district on 14 December 2023

After a 36-day journey that began at Manjeshwar, the Nava Kerala Sadas concluded on December 23, 2023 in Thiruvananthapuram, etching a new chapter in the annals of democratic governance. Kerala government claimed that this movement will strengthen efforts to build a new Kerala.

=== Kasaragod district ===
- November 18 - Manjeshwar Assembly constituency

Kerala Chief Minister Pinarayi Vijayan and ministers inaugurated the ‘Nava Kerala Sadas’ on November 18 in Manjeshwar

- November 19 -Kasaragod, Udma, Kanhangad and Thrikaripur Assembly constituency

=== Kannur district ===
- 20 November - Payyanur Assembly constituency, Irikkur and Taliparamba

Nava Kerala Sadas on 20 November in Payyanur

- 21 November - Kannur, Azhikode, Dharmadam and Thalassery Assembly constituency
- 22 November - Kuthuparamba, Mattanur and Peravoor Assembly constituency

=== Wayanad district ===
- 23 November - Kalpetta, Sulthan Bathery and Mananthavady

=== Kozhikkode district ===
- 24 November - Nadapuram, Perambra, Kuttyadi and Vadakara Assembly constituency
- 25 November - Koyilandy, Balussery, Elathur and Kozhikode North and South
- 26 November - Thiruvambady, Koduvally, Kunnamangalam, Beypore Assembly constituency

=== Malappuram district ===
- 27 November - Ponnani, Tavanur, Tirur and Tanur Assembly constituency
- 28 November - Vallikkunnu, Tirurangadi and Kottakkal Assembly constituency
- 29 November - Manjeri, Mankada and Malappuram Assembly constituency
- 30 November - Ernad, Nilambur, Wandoor and Perinthalmanna Assembly constituency

=== Palakkad district ===
- 1 December - Thrithala, Pattambi, Shornur and Ottapalam Assembly constituency
- 2 December - Palakkad, Malampuzha, Kongad and Mannarkkad Assembly constituency

== Nava Kerala bus ==
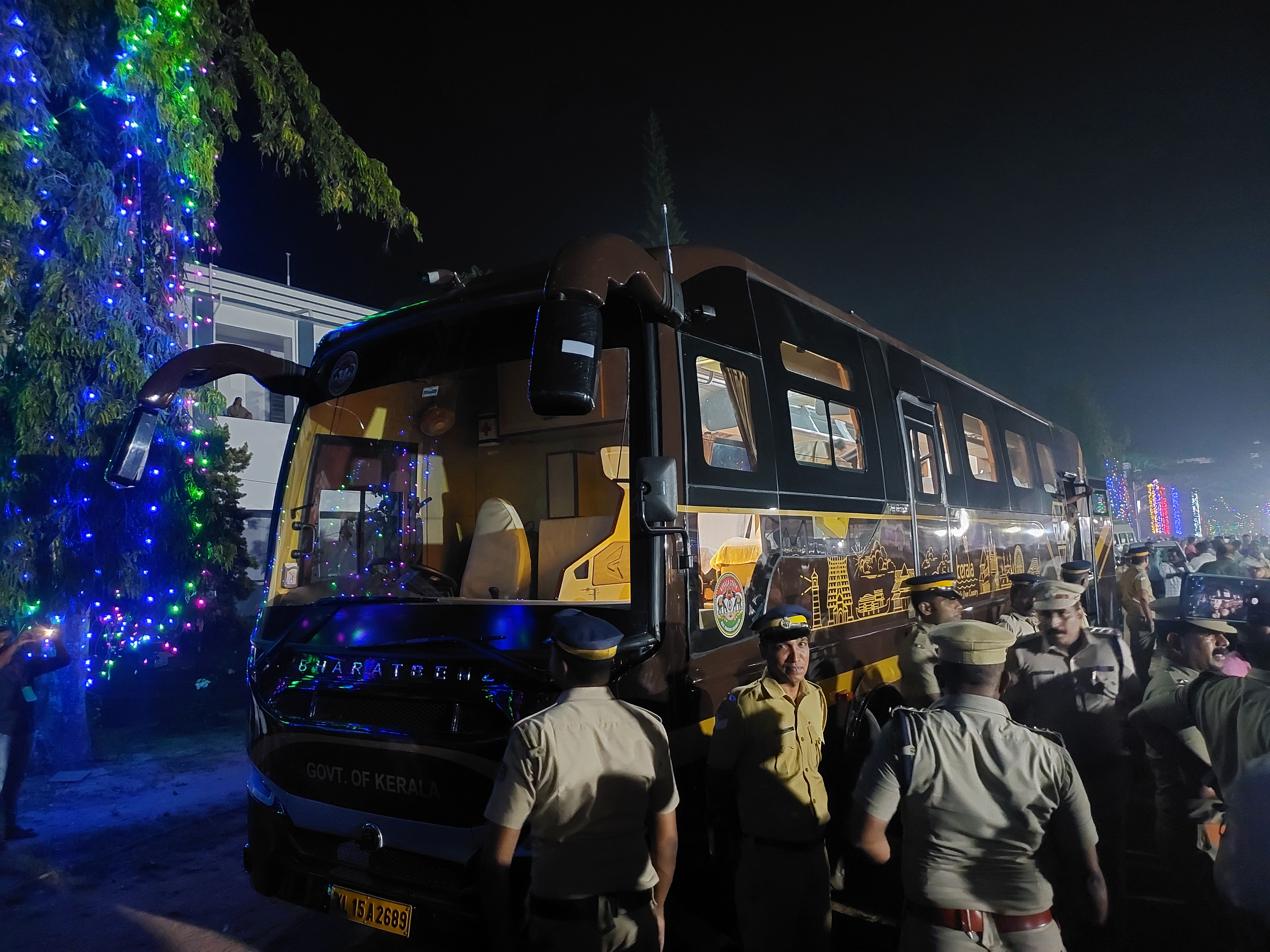
Nava Kerala bus

A BharatBenz coach costing ₹1.05-crore (₹10,500,000) was specially built for the Chief Minister Pinarayi Vijayan and his ministers to use during the 36-daylong Nava Kerala Sadas.

Later, KSRTC started inter-state passenger service with the bus between Kozhikode and Bangalore.

== Controversies ==
=== Allegations of forcing Champad LP School children to attend the Nava Kerala Sadas surfaced ===
On 22 November: Nava Kerala Sadas as allegations of forcing school children to attend the programme surfaced. The msf kerala, the student wing of the Indian Union Muslim League (IUML) has approached the Kerala State Commission for Protection of Child Rights (KeSCPCR), seeking the rights body’s attention to an incident related to the Kerala government’s Nava Kerala Sadas According to the complaint lodged by MSF, students at Champad LP school were made to stand under the scorching sun to greet the Chief Minister of Kerala.

- Kerala govt withdraws DEO order allowing students to participate in Nava Kerala Sadas

Tirurangadi District Educational Officer (DEO) at Malappuram district convened a meeting for the Headmasters in the educational district regarding student participation in the Nava Kerala Sadas.

=== Over cost of bus to be used (Cost: Rs 1.05 crore) ===
On 18 November, a major controversy revolved around the Kerala State RTC’s special BharatBenz coach, reportedly costing Rs 1.05 crore, designated for the travel of Chief Minister Pinarayi Vijayan and other Ministers.

=== Paravur municipality to give ₹1 lakh for the Nava Kerala Sadas ===
On 23 November: Chairperson of Paravur municipality after he agreed to give ₹1 lakh for the Nava Kerala Sadas from the fund of the urban local body.

=== School wall demolished in Malappuram ===
On 24 November: Another controversy School wall demolished in Malappuram to make way for Nava Kerala bus.

=== Youth Congress members beaten up, taken into custody for waving black flag ===
On 20 November: Youth Congress members in protest waved black flags at the Nava Kerala Sadas special bus carrying the chief minister and other cabinet ministers at Kannur.

- DYFI activists attacked the Youth Congress members using helmets and plant pots

The Pazhayangadi police have registered a case against 14 Democratic Youth Federation of India (DYFI) workers for assaulting Youth Congress (YC) members who were waving black flags at Chief Minister Pinarayi Vijayan and other Ministers in Kannur, Kerala.

=== YouTuber attacked at Nava Kerala Sadas ===
On 1 December: another Controversies attack on the YouTuber who came to file a complaint in the Nava kerala audience. Nisar, a native of Malappuram, was beaten up again. Attack of CPIM activists took place inside the Areekode police station compound. Nisar, who was injured in the violence, was treated in a private hospital.
