= Bindhu Krishna =

Indian politician and social worker

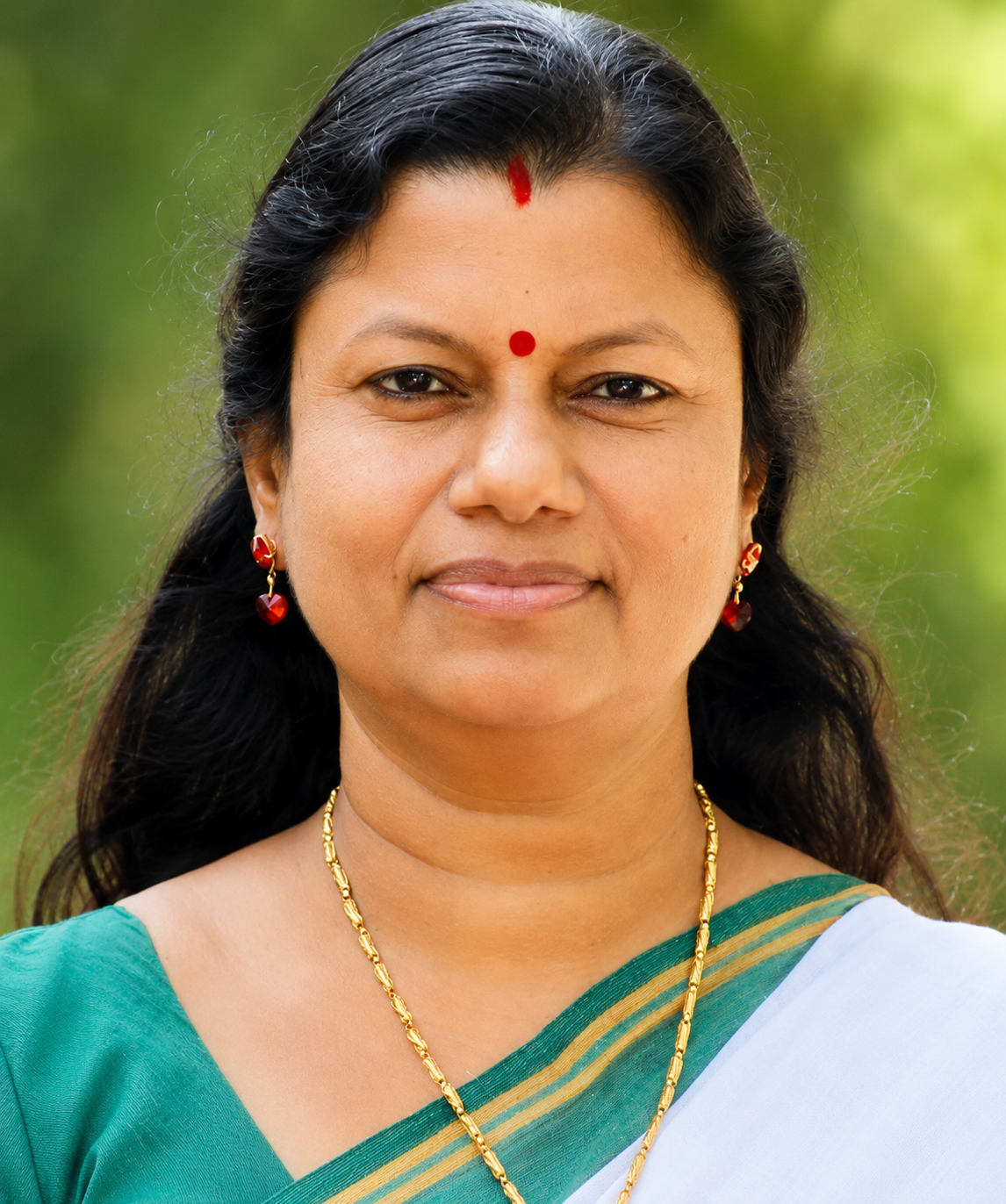

Minister for Women and Child Development, Labour, Animal husbandry and Dairy Development, Government of Kerala
- Incumbent
- Assumed office 18 May 2026
- Governor: Rajendra Arlekar
- Chief minister: V.D. Satheesan
- Portfolio(s): See list: Labour; Animal Husbandry; Dairy Development; Milk Co-operatives; Woman & Child Development; Kerala Veterinary and Animal Sciences University
- Preceded by: J. Chinchu Rani (Animal Husbandry); Veena George (Women and Child Welfare); V. Sivankutty (Labour)

Member of the Kerala Legislative Assembly
- Incumbent
- Assumed office 18 May 2026
- Preceded by: Mukesh
- Constituency: Kollam

President, Kerala Pradesh Mahila Congress
- In office 2016 – March 2018

Personal details
- Party: Indian National Congress
- Spouse: Krishnakumar
- Education: Bachelor of Laws; Master of Laws
- Alma mater: Government Law College, Thiruvananthapuram
- Occupation: Politician

Adv. Bindhu Krishna is an Indian politician and social worker from Kerala. She is the current Minister for Women and Child Development, Labour, Animal Husbandry and Dairy Development, serving since 18 May 2026. She is a senior leader of the Indian National Congress and has served as president of the Kerala Pradesh Mahila Congress. She is married to Krishnakumar.

== Political career ==
Electoral History
| Election | Party | House | Constituency | Status |
|---|---|---|---|---|
| 2011 | INC | Kerala Legislative Assembly | Chathannoor | Lost |
| 2014 | INC | Lok Sabha | Attingal | Lost |
| 2021 | INC | Kerala Legislative Assembly | Kollam | Lost |
| 2026 | INC | Kerala Legislative Assembly | Kollam | Won |

Bindhu Krishna belongs to the Ezhava community has held several leadership positions within the Indian National Congress. She became president of the Kerala Pradesh Mahila Congress in 2016.

She has been active in the Kollam District Congress Committee (DCC) and at the state-level Congress Committee (KPCC). She has contested assembly elections from Kollam constituency as part of the United Democratic Front (UDF).

Bindhu Krishna has been active in promoting women's participation in politics and advocating for equal representation in party leadership.

In the 2026 Kerala Legislative Assembly election, Bindhu Krishna, representing the Indian National Congress, secured a victory in the Kollam constituency. According to the final election trends and results, she received 63,416 votes, winning by a margin of 16,830 votes over her nearest rival, S. Jayamohan of the Communist Party of India (Marxist).
