= Department of Women and Child Development (Kerala) =

Administrative department of the Government of Kerala

Women and Child Development Department

Department overview
- Jurisdiction: India Kerala
- Headquarters: Thiruvananthapuram, Kerala, India
- Minister responsible: Bindu Krishna, Minister for Women and Child Development
- Department executives: Sharmila Mary IAS, Principal Secretary; Haritha V Kumar IAS, Director of Women and Child Development
- Parent department: Government of Kerala
- Website: wcd.kerala.gov.in

The Women and Child Development Department is an administrative department in the Indian state of Kerala, responsible for formulating and implementing policies and programs aimed at the welfare and empowerment of women and children. It operates under the Government of Kerala. The Department of Women and Child was established in 2017 as per GO (MS) No. 24/17/SJD 30.6.17 bifurcating The Social Justice Department. The department has its headquarters in Thiruvananthapuram.

== Leadership ==
The department is headed by a Cabinet Minister of the Government of Kerala, and the incumbent Minister for Women and Child Development is Bindhu Krishna.

The department is administratively headed by a Secretary to Government, an IAS Officer. The current Secretary to Government is, Dr. Sharmila Mary Joseph IAS. The secretary is assisted by additional secretaries, deputy secretaries and other secretariat staffs.

== Functions ==
- Administration of Acts and Rules relating to the welfare of women and children
- Implementation of policies relating to women and child welfare
- Implementation of Centrally Sponsored Schemes relating to women and child welfare
- Administration of the following institutions:
  - Directorate of Women and Child Development Department
  - Kerala Women's Commission
  - Kerala State Commission for Protection of Child Rights
  - Kerala State Women's Development Corporation
  - Juvenile Justice Board
  - Gender Park
  - Kerala State Social Welfare Board
  - ICDS Mission
  - State Child Protection Society
  - State Adoption Resource Agency (SARA)
  - NIRBHAYA
  - Kerala State Sisu Kshema Samithi
  - State Anganwadi Workers and Helpers Welfare Fund Board
  - Gender Advisory Board
  - Sree Chithra Poor Home
  - Vanchi Poor Home

== See also ==
- Department of Senior Citizens Welfare (Kerala)
- Department of Social Justice (Kerala)
