= Department of Social Justice (Kerala) =

Government department in Kerala, India

Social Justice Department

Department overview
- Jurisdiction: India, Kerala
- Headquarters: Government Secretariat, Thiruvananthapuram
- Annual budget: ₹19,237.962 crore (US$2.0 billion) (2026–27, revised)
- Minister responsible: V. E. Abdul Gafoor, Minister for Social Justice
- Department executives: Dr. Adeela Abdulla IAS, Special Secretary to Government; Dr. Mithun Premraj IAS, Director of Social Justice
- Parent department: Government of Kerala
- Child Department: Directorate of Social Justice
- Website: sjd.kerala.gov.in

The Social Justice Department is an administrative department of the Government of Kerala. The department is responsible for formulating and implementing policies aimed at the welfare of socially disadvantaged and marginalised sections, including persons with disabilities, transgender persons, and other vulnerable groups.

The department functions as the nodal agency for the implementation of various social welfare legislations, schemes and missions, and coordinates with line departments and field agencies to ensure effective service delivery. The department’s headquarters is located in Thiruvananthapuram.

== Leadership ==
The department is headed by a Cabinet Minister of the Government of Kerala, and the incumbent Minister for Social Justice is V. E. Abdul Gafoor.

The administrative head of the department is the Special Secretary to Government, an IAS officer. The current Special Secretary is Dr. Adeela Abdulla IAS.

The Directorate of Social Justice is headed by the Director of Social Justice, and the incumbent Director is Dr. Mithun Premraj IAS.

== Functions ==
- Administration and enforcement of social welfare laws and rules in the state
- Formulation and implementation of policies and schemes for the welfare of socially disadvantaged sections
- Implementation of Centrally Sponsored Schemes related to social justice, disability welfare, senior citizens and rehabilitation
- Social security and support to transgender persons, destitute, elderly persons, and disabled individuals
- Rehabilitation, protection, and social reintegration initiatives through field institutions and missions

== Line department ==
=== Directorate of Social Justice ===
The Directorate of Social Justice functions as the primary executive arm of the Social Justice Department. It serves as the nodal implementing agency for all social welfare programmes of the State Government as well as Centrally Sponsored Schemes.

The Directorate is headed by a Director of Social Justice, an IAS cadre officer, who is assisted by Additional Directors, Joint Directors and Assistant Directors at the state level. For field-level administration, District Social Justice Offices function in all 14 revenue districts of Kerala, each headed by a District Social Justice Officer.

The Directorate oversees numerous welfare and rehabilitation institutions across Kerala, including:

- Asha Bhavans
- Homes for physically challenged persons
- Care homes and day-care centres
- Old-age homes and full-time dementia care centres
- Vocational Training Centres
- *Pratheeksha Bhavan* (special rehabilitation home)
- District Probation Offices

These institutions provide social protection, shelter, rehabilitation, and various support services for elderly persons, persons with disabilities, destitute individuals, and other vulnerable groups.

== Agencies / Institutions under the department ==
- Kerala State Disability Commission
- Kerala Social Security Mission (KSSM)
- Kerala State Council for Child Welfare (schemes pertaining to social justice)
- Transgender Cell
- State Resource Centre for Disabilities
- Institutions for rehabilitation and social care (Govt. homes, welfare centres, etc.)

== See also ==
- Department of Senior Citizens Welfare (Kerala)
- Department of Women and Child Development (Kerala)
- Department of Backward Communities Development (Kerala)
- Department of Minority Welfare (Kerala)
- Scheduled Caste and Scheduled Tribes Development Department (Kerala)
