= Kerala Social Security Mission =

Social security scheme in Kerala, India

The Kerala Social Security Mission (KSSM) is a government initiative aimed at providing social welfare services and support to vulnerable populations in the state of Kerala, India. Established under the Department of Social Justice, KSSM plays a crucial role in ensuring social security for marginalized groups, including elderly citizens, disabled individuals, widows, and people living below the poverty line. The mission seeks to enhance the quality of life for these communities by offering various welfare programs, healthcare initiatives, and financial aid schemes. The initiative was started in 2008 as a charitable society under the Government of Kerala.

== Organizational setup ==
The Kerala Social Security Mission is headed by a governing body consisting of 15 individuals, including the minister for social justice as chairman. An executive committee headed by the secretary to government and consisting of five members take care of the day-to-day functioning of the mission. There are three regional directors, two in Thiruvananthapuram and one in Kozhikode.

== Social Security programs ==
- Vayomithram Project, launched in 2010–11, aims at providing comprehensive healthcare and support services to senior citizens aged 65 and above.
- Karunya HealthCare Scheme is a health insurance scheme to provide financial assistance for the treatment of serious diseases and medical conditions for individuals from economically weaker sections of society.
- Sruthitharangam is a cochlear implantation scheme to provide financial assistance for children with severe hearing impairment.
- Thalolam Scheme is an initiative to provide free medical treatment for children below the age of 18 suffering from chronic diseases such as chronic kidney disease, cardiovascular diseases, cerebral palsy, brittle bone disease, hemophilia, thalassemia, sickle cell anemia, orthopedic deformities, congenital anomalies, neurodevelopmental disabilities and accidents needing surgery.
- Snehapoorvam Scheme aims at providing financial assistance and social support to children from economically disadvantaged families, especially those who have lost their parents or guardians.
- Samaswasam Scheme is an initiative designed to support patients with various chronic medical conditions.
- Snehasparsham is an initiative for protecting unwed mothers.
