= Department of Dairy Development (Kerala) =

Government department of Kerala, India

Department overview
- Formed: 1962
- Preceding Department: Agriculture Development & Farmers' Welfare Department
- Jurisdiction: Government of Kerala
- Headquarters: Pattom, Thiruvananthapuram
- Annual budget: ₹225.74 crore (US$23 million) (2026–27, revised)
- Minister responsible: Bindu Krishna, Minister for Animal Husbandry, Dairy Development, Milk Co-operatives and Zoos
- Department executives: Shri. Minhaj Alam IAS, Secretary to Government; Salini Gopinath, Director of Dairy Development
- Website: dairydevelopment.kerala.gov.in

The Dairy Development Department is a department of the Government of Kerala responsible for the development of the dairy sector and related activities in the state. The department has its headquarters in Thiruvananthapuram, Kerala.

== History ==
In 1962, during the tenure of Shri E. P. Paulose as minister for food and animal husbandry, the Dairy Development Department was established in Kerala with Shri N. Balakrishna Pillai as its first Director. The department initially functioned with a directorate in Thiruvananthapuram and a district office attached to it with a small staff. Subsequently, district offices were opened in Ernakulam and Kozhikode.

== Governance ==
The department is headed by a Cabinet minister of the Government of Kerala. The incumbent minister for dairy development is Bindu Krishna.

The department is administratively headed by a principal secretary to government, an IAS officer. The secretary is assisted by additional secretaries, deputy secretaries and under secretaries.

The field-level department, the Directorate of Dairy Development, headquartered in Thiruvananthapuram, is headed by a director appointed by the government. The current director of dairy development is Dr. Salini Gopinath.

== Organisational structure ==
The Directorate of Diary Development, functions under the director. The director is assisted by joint directors and deputy directors at the headquarters.

There are district-level offices in each of the 14 districts, headed by deputy directors of dairy development. In addition, there are five Dairy Training Centres—located in Kollam, Kottayam, Palakkad and Kozhikode—each headed by a deputy director.

At the grassroots, Dairy Extension Service Units operate mostly at the block panchayat level and are headed by dairy extension officers (DEOs). These units also have dairy farm instructors.

=== Specialised divisions ===
There is a State Fodder Farm at Valiyathura and a State Dairy Laboratory at Pattom, Thiruvananthapuram. Regional laboratories are located in Kottayam, Kasaragod and Alathur.

== Autonomous institutions ==
- Kerala Livestock Development and Milk Marketing Board
- Kerala Co-operative Milk Marketing Federation

== See also ==
- Government of Kerala
- Department of Animal Husbandry (Kerala)
- Department of Agriculture Development & Farmers' Welfare (Kerala)
