= Department of Animal Husbandry (Kerala) =

Indian state government department

Agency overview
- Preceding agency: Department of Agricultural Development & Farmers' Welfare
- Jurisdiction: Government of Kerala
- Headquarters: Vikas Bhavan, Thiruvananthapuram – 695033, Kerala, India
- Annual budget: ₹1,221.77 crore (US$130 million) (2026–27, revised)
- Minister responsible: Bindu Krishna, Minister for Animal Husbandry and Diary Development
- Agency executives: Minhaj Alam IAS, Secretary to Government; Rejil M. C. IAS, Director of Animal Husbandry
- Website: https://ahd.kerala.gov.in/

The Department of Animal Husbandry or Animal Husbandry Department is an administrative department of the Government of Kerala. The department is responsible for formulating and implementing policies aimed at the development of the field of animal husbandry. It has its headquarters in Thiruvananthapuram, Kerala.

== Leadership ==
The department is headed by a Cabinet Minister of the Government of Kerala. The incumbent Minister for Animal Husbandry is Bindhu Krishna.

The department is administratively headed by a Secretary to Government, an IAS officer. The secretary is assisted by additional secretaries, joint secretaries, deputy secretaries and under secretaries.

The functions of the department are carried out through various line departments and organizations.

== Objectives ==
The Department of Animal Husbandry has the following objectives:

- Providing Veterinary Service
- Production of Veterinary Biologicals
- Control of Zoonotic Diseases
- Cross breeding-Artificial insemination
- Propagation of small ruminants
- Propagation of backyard poultry
- Conservation of indigenous breeds
- Extension and Training
- Animal Welfare
- Research and Development

== Functions ==
The department maintains veterinary clinics and dispensaries, encourages the expansion of poultry, pig, and livestock farming, controls dry stock farms, monitors laws pertaining to the cruelty to animals. The department is also responsible for the enforcement of Prevention of Cruelty to Animals Act (PCA Act).

== Line departments ==
- Directorate of Animal Husbandry, Kerala

The Directorate of Animal Husbandry is headed by a Director. The director is the head of the department. The director is assisted by two additional directors and three joint directors, six deputy directors and five assistant directors, attached to the headquarters. The Directorate's main technical wings include Veterinary Services and Animal Health, Planning, Livestock Production, Poultry, and Animal Husbandry Statistics.

The responsibility of district level Animal Husbandry activities is vested with the District Animal Husbandry Officer (DAHO) in the cadre of Joint Director.

The department has 14 District Veterinary Centers, 50 Veterinary polyclinics, 215 Veterinary Hospitals, 885 Veterinary Dispensaries, 38 regional AH centre, 9 mobile veterinary hospitals, 7 Mobile Farm Aid Units, 1 motor boat veterinary hospital and 1359 Veterinary sub centers. For the veterinary service, it has a three tier system with well equipped district veterinary centers followed by Veterinary poly clinics and Veterinary hospitals/dispensaries.

== Other institutions ==
- Kerala Veterinary and Animal Sciences University
- College of Veterinary and Animal Sciences, Mannuthy
- Institute of Animal Health and Veterinary Biologicals, Palode
- State Institute for Animal Diseases, Palode, Thiruvananthapuram

== See also ==
- Department of Agriculture Development & Farmers' Welfare (Kerala)
- Department of Dairy Development (Kerala)
