= List of departments and agencies of the Government of Kerala =

Kerala Government Organizations include various departments, agencies, boards, commissions, societies, public sector undertakings, etc. In addition to government departments, the Government of Kerala carries out its functions through various other institutions such as commissions, autonomous bodies, cultural institutions, public enterprises, welfare fund boards, co-operative organisations, development authorities, and universities.

Official emblem of the Government of Kerala

== Departments ==
Secretariat department: Policy making and administrative department of the government. Each department is headed politically by the Cabinet Minister in charge, who is responsible for policy decisions and overall direction. Each secretariat department is headed administratively by an Additional Chief Secretary, Principal Secretary, or Secretary to Government — typically an officer from the Indian Administrative Service (IAS) cadre. Each department includes Special or Additional Secretaries, Joint Secretaries/Deputy Secretaries, Under Secretaries, Section Officers, and other clerical staff. The Chief Secretary to Government coordinates the functioning of various departments in the Secretariat.

Directorate/Commissionerate/Agencies: Executive or field, operational department of the government. These field departments or line departments are headed by officers designated as Director, Commissioner, Director General, or similar titles. These posts may be held by generalist IAS officers or by domain specialists, depending on the nature of the department. Examples include the Transport Commissioner, Director General of Police & State Police Chief, Director General of Fire and Rescue Services, Principal Chief Conservator of Forests, Director of Health Services, Chief Engineer of PWD, Chief Engineer of Irrigation, Director General of Prosecution, and Controller of Legal Metrology, Inspector General of Registration.

=== Secretariat Departments ===
No.	Department
1	Agricultural Development and Farmers Welfare Department
2	Animal Husbandry Department
3	Ayush Department
4	Backward Communities Development Department
5	Co-operation Department
6	Coastal Shipping & Inland Navigation Department
7	Consumer Affairs Department
8	Cultural Affairs Department
9	Dairy Development Department
10	Disaster Management Department
11	Elderly Welfare Department
12	Election Department
13	Electronics & Information Technology Department
14	Environment Department
15	Finance Department
16	Fisheries and Ports Department
17	Food and Civil Supplies Department
18	Forests and Wildlife Department
19	General Administration Department
20	General Education Department
21	Health & Family Welfare Department
22	Higher Education Department
23	Home Department
24	Housing Department
25	Industries and Commerce Department
26	Information and Public Relations Department
27	Labour and Skills Department
28	Law Department
29	Local Self Government Department
30	Minority Welfare Department
31	Non Resident Keralites Affairs (NORKA) Department
32	Parliamentary Affairs Department
33	Personnel & Administrative Reforms Department
34	Planning and Economic Affairs Department
35	Programme Implementation, Evaluation and Monitoring Department
36	Power Department
37	Public Procurement Advisory Department
38	Public Works Department
39	Revenue Department
40	Sainik Welfare Department
41	Scheduled Caste and Scheduled Tribes Development Department
42	Science & Technology Department
43	Social Justice Department
44	Sports & Youth Affairs Department
45	Taxes Department
46	Tourism Department
47	Transport Department
48	Vigilance Department
49	Water Resources Department
50	Women & Child Development Department

=== Line departments / Directorates / Commissionerates / Child Agencies ===
Sl. No.	Department / Organisation	Head of Department (HOD)	Headquarters	Parent dept.	Website
1	Directorate of Agriculture Development and Farmers Welfare	Director	Thiruvanathapuram	Agriculture	
2	Animal Husbandry Department	Director		Animal Husbandry	
3	Directorate of Archeology	Director		Cultural Affairs	
4	Directorate of State Archives	Director		Cultural Affairs	
5	Directorate of Ayurveda Medical Education	Director		AYUSH	
6	Directorate of Backward Classes Development	Director		Backward Classes Development	
7	Chemical Examiner's Laboratory Department	Chief Chemical Examiner		Home	
8	Commissionerate of Civil Supplies and Consumer Affairs	Commissioner		Food, Civil Supplies & Consumer Affairs	
9	Directorate of Coir Development	Director of Coir Development		Industries	
10	Directorate of Collegiate Education	Director		Higher Education	
11	Co-operation Department	Registrar of Co-operative Societies		Co-operation	
12	Directorate of Co-Operative Audit	Director of Co-operative Audit		Co-operation	
13	Commissionerate for Entrance Examinations	Commissioner for Entrance Examinations		Higher Education	
14	Directorate of Culture	Director		Cultural Affairs	
15	Directorate of Dairy Development	Director		Dairy Development	
16	Department of Homoeopathy	Director of Homeopathy		AYUSH	
17	Drugs Control Department	Drugs Controller		Health and Family Welfare	
18	Directorate of Economics and Statistics	Director		Planning and Economic Affairs	
19	Electrical Inspectorate Department	Chief Electrical Inspector		Power	
20	Directorate of Environment and Climate Change	Director		Environment	
21	Kerala Excise Department	Excise Commissioner		Taxes	
22	Factories and Boilers Department	Director		Labour and Skills	
23	Kerala Fire and Rescue Services Department	Director General, Fire and Rescue Services, Civil Defence and Home Guards		Home	
24	Directorate of Fisheries	Director		Fisheries & Ports	
25	Commissionerate of Food Safety	Commissioner		Health and Family Welfare	
26	Kerala Forest Department	Principal Chief Conservator of Forests and Head of Forest Force (HoFF)		Forests and Wildlife	
27	Directorate of General Education	Director of General Education		General Education	
28	Ground Water Department	Director		Water Resources	
29	Directorate of Handlooms and Textiles	Director			
30	Harbour Engineering Department	Chief Engineer			
31	Directorate of Health Services	Director of Health Services		Health & Family Welfare	
32	Housing (Technical Cell) Department	Housing Commissioner		Housing	
33	Hydrographic Survey Wing	Chief Hydrographer			
34	Indian Systems of Medicine Department	Director		AYUSH	
35	Directorate of Industries and Commerce	Director			
36	Industrial Training Department	Director of Training / State Apprenticeship Advisor			
37	Information and Public Relations Department	Director			
38	Kerala State Insurance Department	Director			
39	Insurance Medical Services Department	Director			
40	Irrigation Department	Chief Engineer, Irrigation & Administration		Water Resources	
41	Kerala Institute for Research, Training and Development Studies of Scheduled Castes and Scheduled Tribes (KIRTADS)	Director			
42	Kerala State Audit Department	Director			
43	Kerala State Lotteries Department	Director of State Lotteries			
44	Labour Commissionerate	Labour Commissioner			
45	Land Board	Secretary, Land Board		Revenue	
46	Land Revenue Commissionerate	Commissioner of Land Revenue		Revenue	
47	Land Use Board	Land Use Commissioner		Revenue	
48	Legal Metrology Department	Controller			
49	Principal Directorate, LSGD	Principal Director		Local Self Government Department	
50	Directorate of Medical Education	Director of Medical Education		Health and Family Welfare	
51	Mining and Geology Department	Director		Industries	
52	Directorate of Minority Welfare	Director		Minority Welfare	
53	Kerala Motor Vehicles Department	Transport Commissioner		Transport	
54	Directorate of Museums and Zoos	Director			
55	National Service Scheme	Additional Director General NCC			
56	National Employment Service (Kerala)	Director			
57	National Savings Department	Director			
58	Kerala Police Department	State Police Chief, Kerala		Home	
59	Printing Department	Director of Printing			
60	Kerala Prisons and Correctional Services Department	Director General of Prisons and Correctional Services		Home	
61	Public Works Department	Chief Engineer		Public Works	
62	Registration Department	Inspector General of Registration		Taxes	
63	Sainik Welfare Department	Director		Sainik Welfare	
64	Directorate of Scheduled Castes Development	Director		SC&ST Development	
65	Directorate of Scheduled Tribes Development	Director		SC&ST Development	
66	Directorate of Social Justice	Director			
67	Soil Survey and Soil Conservation Department	Director			
68	Directorate of Sports and Youth Affairs	Director			
69	State Central Library	State Librarian			
70	State Goods and Services Tax Department	Commissioner		Taxes	
71	Stationery Department	Controller of Stationery			
72	Directorate of Survey and Land Records	Director		Revenue	
73	Directorate of Technical Education	Director		Higher Education	
74	Tourism Department	Director		Tourism	
75	Treasuries Department	Director		Finance	
76	Vigilance and Anti-Corruption Bureau	Director of Vigilance and Anti-corruption Bureau		Vigilance	
77	State Water Transport Department	Director		Transport	
78	Directorate of Women and Child Development	Director		Women & Child Development	
79	Directorate of Prosecution	Director General of Prosecution (DGP)	Ernakulam	Home	prosecution.kerala.gov.in

== Boards ==
Sl.No	Board	Concerned Secretariat Department
1	Board of Control for Orphanages and other Charitable Homes	Social Justice
2	Cochin Devaswom Board, Thrissur	Devaswom
3	Co-operative Service Examination Board	Co-operation
4	Guruvayur Devaswom Board	Devaswom
5	Kerala Devaswom Recruitment Board	Devaswom
6	Kerala Khadi and Village Industries Board	Industries
7	Kerala Livestock Development Board Ltd	Animal Husbandry
8	Kerala Road Fund Board	Public Works
9	Kerala State Biodiversity Board	Environment
10	Kerala State Electricity Board	Power
11	Kerala State Housing Board	Housing
12	Kerala State Pollution Control Board	Environment
13	Kerala State Social Welfare Board	Social Justice
14	Kerala State Wakf Board	Minority Welfare
15	Kerala State Youth Welfare Board	Youth Affairs
16	Koodalmanikyam Devaswom, Irinjalakuda	Devaswom
17	Land Use Board	Planning & Economic Affairs
18	Malabar Devaswom Board, Kozhikode	Devaswom
19	Minimum Wages Advisory Board	Labour
20	Public Sector Restructuring and Internal Audit Board	Industries
21	State Agricultural Prices Board	Agriculture
22	State Medicinal Plants Board	AYUSH
23	State Planning Board	Planning & Economic Affairs
24	Travancore Devaswom Board	Devaswom

== Commissions ==
Sl. No.	Name	Type
1	Admission Supervisory Committee for Medical Education in Kerala	Statutory, quasi-judicial
2	Advisory Board, Kerala Anti-Social Activities (Prevention) Act	Statutory, advisory
3	Art and Heritage Commission, Kerala	Advisory
4	Kerala Co-operative Ombudsman	Statutory, quasi-judicial
5	Kerala Electricity Ombudsman	Statutory, quasi-judicial
6	Kerala Law Reforms Commission	Advisory
7	Kerala Real Estate Regulatory Authority	Statutory, regulatory, quasi-judicial
8	Kerala State Commission for Backward Classes	Statutory, advisory
9	Kerala State Commission for Economically Backward Classes among Forward Communities	Statutory, advisory
10	Kerala State Commission for Minorities	Statutory, advisory
11	Kerala State Commission for Protection of Child Rights	Statutory, quasi-judicial
12	Kerala State Commission for Scheduled Castes and Scheduled Tribes	Statutory, advisory
13	Kerala State Consumer Disputes Redressal Commission	Statutory, quasi-judicial
14	Kerala State Electricity Regulatory Commission	Statutory, regulatory, quasi-judicial
15	Kerala State Farmers' Debt Relief Commission	Statutory, quasi-judicial
16	Kerala State Fishermen Debt Relief Commission	Statutory, quasi-judicial
17	Kerala State Human Rights Commission	Statutory, quasi-judicial
18	Kerala State Statistical Commission	Advisory
19	Kerala State Youth Commission	Statutory, advisory
20	Kerala Women's Commission	Statutory, quasi-judicial
21	Non Resident Indian's (Keralites) Commission	Statutory, advisory
22	Official Language (Legislative) Commission	Advisory
23	Ombudsman for Local Self Government Institutions	Statutory, quasi-judicial
24	State Commissionerate for Persons with Disabilities	Statutory, quasi-judicial
25	State Co-operative Election Commission, Kerala	Statutory, quasi-judicial
26	Kerala Public Service Commission	Constitutional
27	Kerala State Election Commission	Constitutional
28	State Food Commission, Kerala	Statutory, quasi-judicial
29	Kerala State Information Commission	Statutory, quasi-judicial
30	State Level Jail Advisory Committee	Advisory

== Tribunals ==
The following is the list of tribunals and appellate authorities:

Sl. No.	Name
1	Kerala Administrative Tribunal
2	Co-operative Arbitration Court
3	Industrial Tribunal and Judge, Thiruvananthapuram
4	Industrial Tribunal and Judge, Kollam
5	Industrial Tribunal and Judge, Alappuzha
6	Industrial Tribunal and Judge, Idukki
7	Industrial Tribunal and Judge, Thrissur
8	Industrial Tribunal and Judge, Palakkad
9	Industrial Tribunal and Judge, Kozhikode
10	Kerala Co-operative Tribunal
11	Kerala Real Estate Appellate Tribunal
12	Kerala Value Added Tax/Agricultural Income Tax and Sales Tax Appellate Tribunal
13	Labour Court, Ernakulam
14	Tribunal for Local Self Government Institutions
15	University Appellate Tribunal
16	Vigilance Tribunal, Thiruvananthapuram
17	Vigilance Tribunal, Kozhikode
18	Waqf Tribunal
19	Water Appellate Authority

== Developmental authorities ==
- Greater Cochin Development Authority (GCDA)
- Thiruvananthapuram Development Authority (TRIDA)
- Goshree Islands Development Authority

== Autonomous bodies, cultural and other institutions ==
- Aardram Mission
- Haritha Keralam Mission
- Life Mission
- Vidyakiranam
- Rebuild Kerala Initiative
- Malayalam Mission
- Kerala Startup Mission
- Additional Skill Acquisition Programme (ASAP)
- Agency for Development of Aquaculture, Kerala (ADAK)
- Agency for Non-Conventional Energy and Rural Technology (ANERT)
- Bharat Bhavan
- Board for Public Sector Transformation (BPT)
- Board of Control for Orphanages and Other Charitable Homes, Kerala
- Centre for Continuing Education Kerala
- Centre for Development of Imaging Technology (C-DIT)
- Centre for Development Studies (CDS)
- Centre for Heritage Studies
- Centre for Management Development (CMD)
- Centre for Research and Education for Social Transformation (CREST)
- Centre for Science and Technology Entrepreneurship Development
- Centre for Water Resources Development and Management (CWRDM)
- Child Development Centre (CDC)
- Comprehensive Health Insurance Agency, Kerala (CHIAK)
- Co‑Operative Academy of Professional Education (CAPE)
- Co‑Operative Service Examination Board
- Council for Food Research and Development
- Cyber Park
- Directorate of Food Craft Institute
- Directorate of Samoohika Sannadhasena
- Technopark
- Energy Management Centre, Kerala
- Farm Information Bureau (FIB)
- Gulati Institute of Finance and Taxation (GIFT)
- Gurugopinath Nadana Gramam
- Indian Institute of Diabetes
- Indian Institute of Handloom Technology-Kannur
- Indian Institute of Information Technology and Management Kerala (IIITM-K)
- Infopark
- Information Kerala Mission
- Institute for Communicative and Cognitive Neurosciences (ICCONS)
- Institute of Human Resources Development (IHRD)
- Institute of Land and Disaster Management
- Institute of Management in Government (IMG)
- Institute of Parliamentary Affairs
- International Centre for Free and Open Source Software (ICFOSS)
- Jawaharlal Nehru Tropical Botanic Garden and Research Institute
- Kerala Academy for Skills Excellence (KASE)
- Kerala Adventure Tourism Promotion Society (KATPS)
- Kerala Aqua Ventures International Limited (KAVIL)
- Kerala Ayurvedic Studies & Research Society
- Kerala Books and Publications Society (KBPS)
- Kerala Bureau of Industrial Promotion (K-BIP)
- Kerala Council for Historical Research (KCHR)
- Kerala Dam Safety Authority
- Kerala Dental Council
- Kerala Devaswom Recruitment Board
- Kerala Development and Innovation Strategic Council
- Kerala Folklore Academy
- Kerala Forest Research Institute (KFRI)
- Kerala Health Research and Welfare Society (KHRWS)
- Kerala Industrial Infrastructure Development Corporation (KINFRA)
- Kerala Infrastructure and Technology for Education (KITE)
- Kerala Infrastructure Investment Fund Board (KIIFB)
- Kerala Institute for Entrepreneurship Development (KIED)
- Kerala Institute of Labour and Employment (KILE)
- Kerala Institute of Local Administration (KILA)
- Kerala Institute of Tourism and Travel Studies (KITTS)
- Kerala Lalithakala Akademi
- Kerala Maritime Board
- Kerala Media Academy
- Kerala Public Enterprises (Selection and Recruitment) Board
- Kerala Rail Development Corporation Ltd
- Kerala Road Safety Authority (KRSA)
- Kerala Rural Water Supply and Sanitation Agency (Jalanidhi)
- Kerala Sahitya Akademi
- Kerala Sangeetha Nataka Akademi
- Kerala Social Security Mission
- Kerala State Agency for Expansion of Cashew Cultivation
- Kerala State AIDS Control Society (KSACS)
- Kerala State Bharat Scouts and Guides
- Kerala State Biodiversity Board
- Kerala State Book Mark
- Kerala State Centre for Advanced Printing and Training (C-APT)
- Kerala State Chalachitra Academy
- Kerala State Coastal Area Development Corporation Ltd (KSCADC)
- Kerala State Council for Clinical Establishments
- Kerala State Council for Science, Technology and Environment (KSCSTE)
- Kerala State Disaster Management Authority (KSDMA)
- Kerala State Haj Committee
- Kerala State Higher Education Council (KSHEC)
- Kerala State Institute of Children's Literature (KSICL)
- Kerala State Institute of Design
- Kerala State IT Mission
- Kerala State Legal Services Authority (KELSA)
- Kerala State Library Council
- Kerala State Literacy Mission Authority
- Kerala State Mediation and Conciliation Centre
- Kerala State Medical Councils
- Kerala State Mental Health Authority
- Kerala State Nirmithi Kendra
- Kerala State Pharmacy Council
- Kerala State Pollution Control Board
- Kerala State Pottery Manufacturing Marketing and Welfare Development Corporation
- Kerala State Remote Sensing and Environment Centre
- Kerala State Science and Technology Museum and Priyadarsini Planetarium
- Kerala State Social Welfare Board
- Kerala State Sports Council
- Kerala State Veterinary Council
- Kerala State Waqf Board
- Kerala State Youth Welfare Board
- Kerala Water Authority (KWA)
- Kerala Youth Leadership Academy (KYLA)
- K. R. Narayanan National Institute of Visual Science & Arts
- Kudumbashree State Poverty Eradication Mission
- Kumaranasan National Institute of Culture
- L. B. S. Centre for Science and Technology
- Mahakavi Moyinkutty Vaidyar Mappila Kala Academy
- Mahatma Gandhi National Rural Employment Guarantee Mission
- Malabar Botanical Garden
- Multi Purpose Cultural Complex
- National Ayush Mission
- National Coir Research and Management Institute
- National Institute of Speech & Hearing (NISH)
- National Health Mission
- National Service Scheme (NSS)
- National Transportation Planning and Research Centre (NATPAC)
- NORKA-Roots
- Office of the Administrator General and Official Trustee of Kerala
- Pareeksha Bhavan
- Permanent Lok Adalat
- P. N. Panicker Vigyan Vikas Kendra
- Public Policy Research Institute
- Rajiv Gandhi Academy for Aviation Technology
- Rajiv Gandhi Centre for Bio-Technology
- Rashtriya Uchchatar Shiksha Abhiyan (RUSA)
- Regional Institute of Ophthalmology
- Samagra Shiksha Kerala (SSK)
- Sophisticated Test & Instrumentation Centre
- Sree Chithira Thirunal College of Engineering
- Sreenarayana International Study and Pilgrim Centre
- State Academy on Statistical Administration (SASA)
- State Advisory Contract Labour Board
- State Agricultural Management & Extension Training Institute
- State Co‑Operative Union
- State Council for Open and Lifelong Education—Kerala (SCOLE–Kerala)
- State Council of Educational Research and Training, Kerala (SCERT Kerala)
- State Health Agency (SHA)
- State Horticulture Mission
- State Institute of Educational Management and Training–Kerala (SIEMAT–Kerala)
- State Institute of Educational Technology (SIET)
- State Institute of Languages
- State Institute of Medical Education and Technology (SI-MET)
- State Medicinal Plants Board
- State Mission Management Unit, AMRUT
- State Police Complaints Authority
- State Resource Centre–Kerala
- Suchitwa Mission
- The Gender Park
- Thenmala Ecotourism Promotion Society (TEPS)
- The State Institute of Encyclopaedic Publication
- Vasthuvidya Gurukulam

== Welfare fund boards ==
Welfare Fund Boards of Kerala
Sl. No	Board
1	Kerala Abkari Workers Welfare Fund Board
2	Kerala Agricultural Workers Welfare Fund Board
3	Kerala Bamboo, Kattuvally, Vettuva, Ezhuvela, Mullukallu and Similar Workers Welfare Fund Board
4	Kerala Beedi and Cigar Workers Welfare Fund Board
5	Kerala Coir Workers Welfare Fund Board
6	Kerala Construction Workers Welfare Fund Board
7	Kerala Cultural Workers Welfare Fund Board
8	Kerala Domestic Workers Welfare Fund Board
9	Kerala Drivers Welfare Fund Board
10	Kerala Handloom Workers Welfare Fund Board
11	Kerala Lottery Agents and Sellers Welfare Fund Board
12	Kerala Maternity Benefit Fund Board
13	Kerala Motor Transport Workers Welfare Fund Board
14	Kerala Shops and Commercial Establishments Workers Welfare Fund Board
15	Kerala Small Plantation Workers Welfare Fund Board
16	Kerala Tailoring Workers Welfare Fund Board
17	Kerala Toddy Workers Welfare Fund Board
18	Kerala Traditional Industries Workers Welfare Fund Board
19	Kerala Unorganised Sector Workers Social Security Board
20	Kerala Welfare Fund Board for Anganwadi Workers and Helpers

== Universities / Colleges ==
Universities in Kerala
Sl. No	University	Parent secretariat department
1	APJ Abdul Kalam Technological University (KTU)	Higher Education Department
2	Cochin University of Science and Technology (CUSAT)	Higher Education Department
3	Kannur University (KU)	Higher Education Department
4	Kerala Agricultural University (KAU)	Agriculture Development & Farmers' Welfare Department
5	Kerala University of Health Sciences (KUHS)	Health & Family Welfare Department
6	Mahatma Gandhi University (MGU)	Higher Education Department
7	Sree Sankaracharya University of Sanskrit (SSUS)	Higher Education Department
8	University of Calicut (UoC)	Higher Education Department
9	University of Kerala (UoK)	Higher Education Department
10	Kerala University of Digital Sciences, Innovation and Technology (DUK)	Electronics & IT Department
11	Kerala University of Fisheries and Ocean Studies (KUFOS)	Fisheries Department
12	Kerala Veterinary and Animal Sciences University (KVASU)	Animal Husbandry Department
13	Kerala Kalamandalam (KK)	Culture Department
14	Thunchath Ezhuthachan Malayalam University (TEMU)	Higher Education Department
15	Sree Narayana Guru Open University (SNGOU)	Higher Education Department
16	Central University of Kerala (CUK)	Ministry of Education (Government of India)
17	National University of Advanced Legal Studies (NUALS)	Higher Education Department
18	Aligarh Muslim University Centre, Malappuram (AMU)	Ministry of Education (Government of India)

Cancer centres under the Government of Kerala
Sl. No.	Cancer centre	Location	Sector
1	Regional Cancer Centre, Thiruvananthapuram	Thiruvananthapuram	Health and Family Welfare
2	Malabar Cancer Centre	Thalassery, Kannur	Health and Family Welfare
3	Cochin Cancer Research Centre	Kochi, Ernakulam	Health and Family Welfare

Government medical and dental colleges in Kerala
Sl. No.	Institution	Location	Sector
1	Government Medical College, Thiruvananthapuram	Thiruvananthapuram	Health and Family Welfare
2	Government Medical College, Kollam	Parippally	Health and Family Welfare
3	Government Medical College, Alappuzha	Alappuzha	Health and Family Welfare
4	Government Medical College, Kottayam	Kottayam	Health and Family Welfare
5	Government Medical College, Ernakulam	Kalamassery	Health and Family Welfare
6	Government Medical College, Thrissur	Mulankunnathukavu	Health and Family Welfare
7	Government Medical College, Palakkad	Yakkara	Health and Family Welfare
8	Government Medical College, Manjeri	Manjeri	Health and Family Welfare
9	Government Medical College, Kozhikode	Kozhikode	Health and Family Welfare
10	Government Medical College, Kannur	Pariyaram	Health and Family Welfare
11	Government Medical College, Idukki	Painavu	Health and Family Welfare
12	Government Medical College, Kasaragod	Kasaragod	Health and Family Welfare
13	Government Dental College, Thiruvananthapuram	Thiruvananthapuram	Health and Family Welfare
14	Government Dental College, Kottayam	Kottayam	Health and Family Welfare
15	Government Dental College, Kozhikode	Kozhikode	Health and Family Welfare
16	Government Dental College, Alappuzha	Alappuzha	Health and Family Welfare
17	Government Dental College, Kannur	Pariyaram	Health and Family Welfare

Government Ayurveda and Homoeopathic medical colleges in Kerala
Sl. No.	Institution	Sector
1	Government Ayurveda College, Thiruvananthapuram	AYUSH
2	Government Ayurveda College, Tripunithura	AYUSH
3	Government Ayurveda College, Pariyaram	AYUSH
4	Government Homoeopathic Medical College, Thiruvananthapuram	AYUSH
5	Government Homoeopathic Medical College, Kozhikode	AYUSH

Government Law Colleges
Sl. No.	Institution	Sector
1	Government Law College, Thiruvananthapuram	Higher Education
2	Government Law College, Ernakulam	Higher Education
3	Government Law College, Thrissur	Higher Education
4	Government Law College, Kozhikode	Higher Education

Government Engineering Colleges
Sl. No.	Institution	Sector
1	College of Engineering, Thiruvananthapuram	Higher Education
2	Government Engineering College, Barton Hill	Higher Education
3	Rajiv Gandhi Institute of Technology, Kottayam	Higher Education
4	Government Engineering College, Idukki	Higher Education
5	Government Engineering College, Thrissur	Higher Education
6	Government Engineering College, Sreekrishnapuram	Higher Education
7	Government Engineering College, Kozhikode	Higher Education
8	Government Engineering College, Wayanad	Higher Education
9	Government College of Engineering, Kannur	Higher Education

== Societies ==
List of Societies under Government of Kerala
Sl. No	Name	Abbreviation
1	Kerala Ayurvedic Studies & Research Society	–
2	Kerala Adventure Tourism Promotion Society	KATPS
3	Kerala Books and Publications Society	KBPS
4	Kerala Health Research and Welfare Society	KHRWS
5	Kerala State AIDS Control Society	KSACS
6	Kerala Rural Employment and Welfare Society	–
7	Kerala State Cashew Workers’ Apex Industrial Co-operative Society Ltd.	CAPEX
8	Kerala State Handloom Weavers Co-operative Society Ltd. No. H. 232	HANTEX
9	Thenmala Ecotourism Promotion Society	TEPS

== See also ==
- List of government of India establishments in Kerala
