= Kerala State Planning Board =

Indian state advisory board

Agency overview
- Formed: September 1967
- Jurisdiction: Government of Kerala
- Headquarters: Thiruvananthapuram, Kerala, India
- Minister responsible: V.D. Satheesan, Chief Minister of Kerala, Chairperson of the Board
- Agency executive: K. M. Chandrasekhar, Vice-Chairperson of the Board
- Parent department: Planning and Economics Affairs Department, Government of Kerala
- Website: www.spb.kerala.gov.in

The Kerala State Planning Board is an advisory board under the Government of the State of Kerala, India. It was constituted in 1967 with Chief Minister as Chairman and a non-official as part-time Vice-Chairman. The board assists the state government in formulating a development plan based on a scientific assessment of the resources (material, capital and human) available to the state. A comprehensive economic review of the state is prepared by the board every year.

== Members ==
As of July 2026, the composition of the Kerala State Planning Board is as follows:

Position	Office holder
Chairperson	V.D. Satheesan (Chief Minister)
Vice Chairperson	K.M. Chandrasekhar (Rtd. IAS)
Member	P.K. Kunhalikutty – Minister for Industries and Information Technology
Member	Sunny Joseph – Minister for Electricity and Environment
Member	Mons Joseph – Minister for Water Resources and Housing
Member	Shibu Baby John – Minister for Forests, Skills and Cashew
Member	C.P. John – Minister for Transport

The non-Minister members are from various fields of expertise and are nominated from time to time by the Government. These members provide expert advice and inputs in the domains of their expertise, on Plan formulation and policy matters to the Government. Chief Secretary to the Government and Additional Chief Secretary, Finance Department are permanent invitees to the Board.

=== Member Secretary ===
- K.R. Jyothilal – IAS

== Duties/Responsibilities ==
The official duties of the Board are performed by eight important divisions. They are:

1. Plan Co-ordination Division
2. Agriculture Division
3. Evaluation Division
4. Social Service Division
5. Industry and Infrastructure Division
6. Decentralized Planning Division
7. Perspective Planning Division
8. Information and Technology Wing

=== Plan Co-ordination Division ===
This division co-ordinates all the activities concerned with the technical functions of the State Planning Board. It has been entrusted with the following functions:

- Assist in the preparation of Economic Review.
- Prepare reports as to the resource allocation of the state.
- Provide nuts and bolts regarding development plans to the state and Central governments.
- Prepare background papers and notes for discussion between Chief Minister of Kerala and Deputy Chairman of Planning Commission.

=== Agriculture Division ===
Agriculture Division deals with the Plan and Budget preparation of the Departments of Agriculture, Animal Husbandry, Dairy Development, Fisheries, Forestry and Wildlife, Co-operation, Water Resources, Ground Water Development and Command Area Development Authority. The division also reviews the performance of the concerned sectors for the preparation of 'Economic Review' published by the State Planning Board. The projects for external /NCDC assistance are vetted in the division before they are trainings /workshops /seminars conducted in connection with decentralised planning. The staff of the division effectively participate in the vetting of the projects submitted for the approval of the State Level Expert Committee.

=== Evaluation Division ===
The Evaluation Division of the State Planning Board is functioning since 1969. The division since its inception has undertaken Monitoring and Evaluation of two externally aided Projects: World Bank assisted Kerala Agricultural Development Project and EEC assisted Kerala Minor Irrigation Project. As part of the People's Campaign for the Ninth Five Year Plan of the State, evaluation studies on development programmes carried out by local bodies were taken up by this division.

This division performs the following duties:

- To study the modus operandi of existing government projects and programmes in Five Year Plans and Annual Plans.
- To find out the hurdles in implementation of government programmes and to ensure the beneficiaries the desired results.
- To increase the efficiency of government projects and to provide guidelines over such matters.

=== Social Service Division ===
Social Service Division deals with the subjects like education, medical and public health, water supply and sanitation, housing, information and publicity, labour and labour welfare, social welfare, nutrition etc.

Following are the functions of the division:

- Formulation of Five Year Plan and Annual Plan documents.
- Preparation of Annual Plan Budget.
- Providing technical assistance to the State Planning Board over the subjects concerned.

=== Industry and Infrastructure Division ===
The division undertakes the following works.

- Formulation of Five Year Plan and Annual Plan.
- Preparation of Plan Budget.
- Preparation of Economy Review.
- Technical and expert opinion on matters referred to State Planning Board.
- Processing of Government files.
- Preparation of Status Paper on various sectors.
- Project appraisal.
- Preparation of reports of Plan committees and Working Groups.
- Review of implementation of Plan Schemes.
- Preparation of reports/notes on specific issues.
- Answering to LA interpellations.
- Mid term appraisal of Five Year Plans.

=== Decentralised Planning Division ===
The division takes up the preparation of Five year plans, Annual Plans, Budget Estimates, Economic Review etc. relating to :-

- Community Development and Panchayats.
- Rural Development.
- Development of Scheduled Castes and Scheduled Tribes.
- Urban Development.
- Co-ordination of Activities of plan formulation and implementation by Local Governments.
- Preparation of Guidelines and instructions for Local level planning.

=== Perspective Planning Division ===
The Perspective Division is capable of doing the following works.

- Formulate Five Year Plans, Annual Plans and Annual Plan Budgets.
- Undertake studies on different subjects as and when entrusted to the division.
- Give replies and remarks on Govt. files and the letters from Government departments.

=== Information and Technology Wing ===
It is under the supervision of IT Wing that the official website of State Planning Board is monitored and updated. The Wing also provides 'Information Technology' based solutions to all the technical divisions and also to the administration sections of the State Planning Board. It also provides assistance for the computerisation of Economic Review, Plan Budget and also for the project details of the local bodies having undertaken in the District Planning Offices.

== See also ==
- List of Kerala State Government Organizations
- Peoples Planning in Kerala
