= Kerala Road Safety Authority =

Statutory body of the Government of Kerala

Agency overview
- Formed: 2007; 19 years ago
- Type: Statutory authority
- Jurisdiction: Government of Kerala
- Headquarters: Trans Towers, Vazhuthacaud Thiruvananthapuram, Kerala-695014
- Ministers responsible: C. P. John, Chairman (Transport Minister); P. K. Basheer, Vice-Chairman (PWD Minister)
- Agency executive: Yogesh Gupta, IPS, Road Safety Commissioner
- Website: roadsafety.kerala.gov.in

The Kerala Road Safety Authority (KRSA) is a statutory body of the Government of Kerala. It was established in 2007 under the Kerala Road Safety Authority Act, 2007 to coordinate and implement road safety programmes in the state of Kerala, India. It is the nodal agency of the Government for road safety initiatives in the state. It has its headquarters in Trans Towers, Thiruvananthapuram.

== History ==
The Kerala Road Safety Authority was established under the Kerala Road Safety Authority Act, 2007, making Kerala one of the first states in India to establish a statutory authority dedicated to road safety.

== Organisation ==
The KRSA is chaired by the Minister for Transport, with the Minister for Public Works as vice-chairperson. The Road Safety Commissioner is the chief executive officer of the Authority. The Authority consists of the following members:

Role	Constituent	Incumbent
Chairperson	Minister for Transport	C. P. John
Vice-chairperson	Minister for Public Works	P. K. Basheer
Member	Chief Secretary to Government	Biswanath Sinha, IAS
Chief Executive Officer	Road Safety Commissioner	
Member	Principal Secretary, Transport Department	
Member	Law Secretary	
Member	Additional Chief Secretary, Home Department	
Member	Additional Chief Secretary, Finance Department	
Member	Principal Secretary, Public Works Department	
Member	Principal Secretary, Health and Family Welfare Department	
Member	Principal Secretary, General Education Department	
Member	Principal Secretary, Local Self Government Department	
Member	Director General of Police & State Police Chief, Kerala	
Member	Director of Health Services	
Member	Inspector General of Police (Traffic)	
Member	Chief Engineer (Roads and Bridges)	
Member	Chief Engineer (National Highways)	
Member	Director, National Transportation Planning and Research Centre	
Member	Secretary, State Transport Authority	
Member	Three road safety experts nominated by the Government	

Executive Committee of KRSA
Role	Constituent
Chairperson	Chief Secretary
Vice-chairperson	Road Safety Commissioner
Member	Inspector General of Police (Traffic and RSM)
Member	Chief Engineer (Roads and Bridges)
Member	Chief Engineer (National Highways)
Member	Director, Health Services Department
Member	Director, National Transportation Planning and Research Centre
Member Secretary	Secretary, State Transport Authority

District Road Safety Councils are constituted in each of Kerala's 14 districts under the chairmanship of the respective District Collector.

== Functions ==
- Road safety management among various departments in the government
- Advice government on the Road Safety Policy
- Prescribing and enforcing road safety standards and procedures
- Formulate and implement projects, schemes, and programmes related to Road Safety
- Promote road safety awareness
- Integrates the functions of various departments and agencies involved in road safety.
- Administers the Road Safety Fund.
- Sanctions expenditure for road safety schemes, programmes, projects, equipment and devices.
- Sanctions expenditure for studies and research on road safety.
- Sanctions expenditure for trauma-care programmes and activities.
- Funds road safety projects and the purchase and installation of road safety equipment, vehicles and devices.

== Funding ==
- 100% of the road safety cess collected from vehicle owners at the time of vehicle registration.
- 50% of the compounding fees collected for traffic offences by the Kerala Police and Motor Vehicles Department.
- Grants, loans and advances from the Government of Kerala and the Government of India.
- Contributions from public and private organisations.

== Stakeholders ==
- Kerala Police (Road Safety Enforcement)
- Kerala Motor Vehicles Department (Vehicle regulation and Road Safety Enforcement)
- Kerala Public Works Department (Road infrastructure development and maintenance)
- National Transportation Planning and Research Centre (NATPAC) (Transportation planning and research)
- Department of Health Services (DHS) (Emergency medical services and trauma care)

== Major projects funded by KRSA ==
- Safe Kerala Project by Kerala MVD
- Digital Enforcement Systems by MVD and Police
- Identification and Prioritisation of Black spots - NATPAC
- Blackspot rectification through the PWD, NHAI, LSGD Engineering Wing.
- Four Safe Road Corridor Projects
- Safe Zone Sabarimala implemented through the Kerala MVD.

== See also ==
- List of departments and agencies of the Government of Kerala
