= People's Planning in Kerala =

Plan for establishing local self-government institutions in Kerala

People's Planning refers to the establishment of local self-government institutions in Kerala in 1996 as per the 73rd and 74th amendments of the Constitution of India in 1992 which entrusted states with the responsibility of establishing Panchayati Raj institutions and Urban Local Bodies. In Kerala, it underwent during India's Ninth Five-Year Plan, and hence it was also called "People's Campaign for Ninth Plan".

During the ninth plan, the Government of Kerala took a decision to devolve 35 percent of the state development budget down from a centralized bureaucracy to local governments where local people could determine and implement their own development priorities. This was implemented through the People's Plan Campaign (PPC) under the joint supervision of the Department of Local Self-Government and State Planning Board.

== Outcome ==
Studies on the performance of the people's planning and decentralization tend to show a mixed trend: it is not a resounding success but also not an utter failure. There were several issues that hampered the plan from the start and these included "weak and highly centralised administrative setup and inadequacy in administrative procedure, lack of experience, and inadequate database." These challenges often prevent the state government to pass the financial and management functions to the local level.

However, recent developments start to demonstrate efficiencies once administrative controls are eliminated. This is attributed to the elimination of the opportunity for administrative corruption as well as the increased transparency due to the involvement of several people at several levels of the decision-making process.

== See also ==
- Local Governance in Kerala
- Nava Kerala Mission
