= Department of Industries =

Department of Industries may refer to:

- Department of Industries (Kerala)
- Department of Industries (Tamil Nadu)
