= Aardram Mission =

Public health mission in Kerala

Public health initiative overview
- Formed: February 2017
- Jurisdiction: Government of Kerala
- Headquarters: Kerala, India
- Parent Public health initiative: National Health Mission

Aardram Mission is a health initiative launched by the Government of Kerala in February 2017 as part of the broader 'Nava Kerala Mission'. Its primary objective is to transform the public health sector to align with the United Nations' Sustainable Development Goal 3 (SDG 3): "Good Health and Well-being".

== Objectives ==
The main objectives of the Aardram mission are to provide people friendly outpatient services, re-engineering primary health centres into family health centres, provide access to comprehensive health services for marginalized and vulnerable populations and standardization of services across healthcare settings.

== Outcomes ==
Kerala has upgraded 170 primary health centres to family health centres in 2017-18 and 500 in 2018–2019. The mission involved collaborative work with Panchayati Rajs, Sampoorna Yoga Keralam, Social Welfare Department and other public bodies.

== Implementation strategies ==
During 2017–18, around 20 lakhs INR was provided for each participating institution from the state government as the implementation agency. Transitioning primary health centres into family health centres involves infrastructural improvements, staff training, and enhanced laboratory facilities to provide preventive, promotive, curative, palliative, and rehabilitative services, which is covered under this mission. Engaging local communities through initiatives like 'Arogyasena' to promote collective efforts in improving health outcomes is a feature of this mission. The implementation strategies are planned at the local body level and social indicators of health are the focus areas of this mission.
