= Department of Parliamentary Affairs (Kerala) =

Government department in Kerala, India

Parliamentary Affairs Department
- Emblem of Kerala

Department overview
- Jurisdiction: Government of Kerala
- Headquarters: Government Secretariat, Thiruvananthapuram, Kerala, India
- Minister responsible: Sunny Joseph, Minister for Parliamentary Affairs
- Department executive: Raju Narayanaswami IAS, Principal Secretary to Government
- Child Department: Institute of Parliamentary Affairs, Kerala
- Website: https://ipaffairs.org/en/

Parliamentary Affairs Department, is an administrative department of the Government of Kerala. The department ensures coordination between the Government and the Kerala Legislative Assembly. It has its headquarters in Government Secretariat, Thiruvananthapuram.

Sunny Joseph has been serving as the Minister for Parliamentary Affairs of Kerala since May 2026.

== Leadership ==
The department is headed politically by a Cabinet Minister of the Government. The incumbent Minister is Sunny Joseph. Administratively, the department is headed by a Secretary to Government, a senior IAS officer, who is assisted by Additional Secretaries, Deputy Secretaries, Under Secretaries, and other Secretariat staff.

== Functions ==
The department is responsible for coordinating legislative business between the Government of Kerala and the Kerala Legislative Assembly, including legislative sessions, government business in the House, assurances made by ministers, committee matters, and other parliamentary affairs.

Parliamentary matters

- Monitoring and ensuring follow-up action on assurances and commitments made by Ministers in the Kerala Legislative Assembly.
- Coordination of the sittings of Legislative Committees and follow-up on their reports.
- Handling interpellations and related matters concerning the Lok Sabha and Rajya Sabha.
- Handling establishment matters of Legislature Secretariat personnel referred to the Government.
- Processing proposals relating to legislative sessions, Assembly dissolution, and the Governor's Address.
- Planning and co-ordination of the official business in the House.
- Allocation of Government time for discussion of members' motions in the Legislature.
- Liaison with the leaders of the political parties.
- Follow up action of the LA Questions asked to Minister of Parliamentary Affairs Department.
- Processing the appointment of Legislators to committees, boards, and other bodies constituted by the Government.
- Preparation of the Business of each session of the House except legislation (including fixing dates for presentation of Budget, Supplementary Budget and for discussion thereof).

The Parliamentary Affairs Department is responsible for the administration of pension, salary, and allowance provisions for Members of Legislative Assembly (MLAs) under the relevant Acts and Rules.

- Kerala Payment of Pension to Members of Legislature Act, 1976
- Payment of Salaries and Allowances Act, 1951 and the Rules thereunder.

== List of Ministers ==
- A. K. Balan (2016-2021)
- M.B. Rajesh (2021-2026)
- Sunny Joseph (2026- Present)

== See also ==
- Department of Law (Kerala)
- Department of General Administration (Kerala)
- Ministry of Parliamentary Affairs (India)
