= Department of Planning and Economic Affairs (Kerala) =

Government department in Kerala, India

- Emblem of Kerala

Department overview
- Jurisdiction: Government of Kerala
- Headquarters: Government Secretariat, Thiruvananthapuram, Kerala, India
- Minister responsible: V.D. Satheesan, Minister for Planning and Economic Affairs
- Department executive: Dr. Sharmila Mary Joseph IAS, Principal Secretary, Planning and Economic Affairs Department
- Parent Department: Government of Kerala
- Child agencies: State Planning Board; Centre for Development Studies

The Department of Planning and Economic Affairs is one of the departments of Government of Kerala. The Planning and Economic Affairs Department is responsible for formulating development plans, economic policy, plan fund management, official statistics and coordinating economic policies and programmes in Kerala. It has its headquarters in Kerala Government Secretariat, Thiruvananthapuram.

== Leadership ==
The Planning and Economic Affairs Department generally functions under the Chief Minister of Kerala. The incumbent minister incharge is V.D. Satheesan. The department is administravely headed by an Additional Chief Secretary to Government, a senior IAS officer.

== Functions ==
The following are the functions of the department;

Planning

- Administration of Department of Economics and Statistics
- Database for Planning
- Computer-based planning, monitoring, and data management systems, including State and District Informatics Centres
- Economic and financial policy issues, including Centre–State financial relations.
- Preparation of the Economic Survey, analysis of the State and Union Budgets, and annual reviews of taxation and related matters
- Formulation of Development Plans, Perspective Plans, Five Year Plans and Annual

Plans

- Plan resources and mobilisation
- Monitoring and evaluation of plan programmes
- Multilevel Planning State, District, Block and local levels
- Manpower and Employment Planning
- District Development Councils
- Project formulation, project analysis and appraisal, and measures for improving project preparation.
- State Planning Board
- Coordination of the Western Ghats and Special Area Programme, including scrutiny of schemes and projects.
- Kerala State Land Use Board and Centre for Land Use and Environment Studies.
- Monitoring and evaluation of the Special Component Plan and Tribal Sub-Plan.

Economic affairs

- Foreign assistance and collaboration with bilateral and United Nations agencies, including the International Bank for Reconstruction and Development (IBRD) and the Asian Development Bank (ADB).
- Institutional finance and coordination with financial institutions such as the Reserve Bank of India (RBI), National Bank for Agriculture and Rural Development (NABARD), Industrial Finance Corporation of India (IFCI), Industrial Credit and Investment Corporation of India (ICICI), Industrial Development Bank of India (IDBI), Life Insurance Corporation of India (LIC), Rural Electrification Corporation (REC), Housing and Urban Development Corporation (HUDCO), and other financial institutions and banks.
- Banking operations relating to Government and allied matters.
- Price-related matters.
- Residual matters relating to the settlement of assets and liabilities under the States Reorganisation Act.
- Matters relating to the Finance Commission.
- Kerala Technical Consultancy Organisation Ltd.
- Centre for Development Studies.
- Assistance to research centres engaged in planning and economic development.

Bureau of Public Enterprises

- General consideration and review of Public Enterprises
- Public Enterprises Board and allied matters
- Public Enterprises Selection Board

== Allied agencies ==
- Directorate of Economics and Statistics: The Directorate of Economics and Statistics is the nodal agency for official statistics in Kerala and serves as the central institution of the state's statistical system. The Director of Economics and Statistics is the technical and administrative head of the department. The department comprises the Directorate, 14 District Statistical Offices, and 61 Taluk Statistical Offices.
- Kerala State Planning Board: The Kerala State Planning Board is the government's apex advisory body for development planning and policy formulation. The board functions under the chairmanship of Chief Minister of Kerala, with a vice chairperson, and members and a member secretary.
- District Planning Committee (DPCs): These planning committees functions at the district level.

== See also ==
- Department of Finance (Kerala)
- Government of Kerala
