= Department of Transport (Kerala) =

Transport department of the Government of Kerala

Transport Department Government of Kerala

Department overview
- Jurisdiction: Government of Kerala
- Headquarters: Thiruvananthapuram, Kerala, India
- Annual budget: ₹2,753.4517 crore (US$290 million) (2026–27, revised)
- Minister responsible: C. P. John, Minister for Transport
- Department executives: T. V. Anupama, IAS, Secretary to Government (Transport); Nagaraju Chakilam IPS, Transport Commissioner
- Child agencies: Kerala Motor Vehicles Department; Kerala Road Safety Authority; KSRTC; Kerala State Water Transport Department
- Website: kerala.gov.in

The Department of Transport or Transport Department is an administrative department under the Government of Kerala responsible for transport policy formulation, regulation of road transport, motor vehicle administration, and oversight of state transport utilities. The department manages road safety initiatives, vehicle registration, issuance of driving licences, and enforcement of motor vehicles laws in the state.

The department also oversees major transport institutions including the Kerala State Road Transport Corporation (KSRTC), Kerala Transport Development Finance Corporation (KTDFC), and the Kerala Road Safety Authority (KRSA).

== Leadership ==
The Department of Transport is headed by a Cabinet Minister of the Government of Kerala, and the incumbent Minister is C. P. John.

Administratively, the department is headed by a Secretary to Government, an IAS officer posted in the Secretariat. The Secretary is supported by Additional Secretaries, Joint Secretaries, Under Secretaries, and other administrative staff in the department.

== Functions ==
- Formulation and implementation of state transport policies and programmes.
- Motor Vehicles administration including vehicle registration, driving licences, permitting, and regulation of passenger transport.
- Road safety planning and coordination of the State Road Safety Authority.
- Administration of state road transport corporations and transport-related public sector undertakings.
- Implementation of Central and State transport schemes and e-governance projects related to transport.

== Sub-divisions ==
- Airport Authority of India (Land Acquisition) Wing
- Cochin Metro Rail Project (Land Acquisition)

== Directorates / Line Departments ==
- Kerala Motor Vehicles Department (MVD)

== Public Sector Undertakings ==
- Kerala State Road Transport Corporation (KSRTC)
- Kerala State Water Transport Department (KSWTD)
- Kerala State Road Transport Corporation – Swift (KSRTC-SWIFT)
- Kochi Metro Rail Limited (KMRL)
- Kerala Rail Development Corporation Limited (KRDCL)
- Kerala Transport Development Finance Corporation (KTDFC)
- Kannur International Airport
- Cochin International Airport Ltd. (CIAL)

== Statutory bodies ==
- Kerala Road Safety Authority (KRSA)
- Kerala State Transport Authority (KSTA)

== Autonomous institutions ==
- National Transportation Planning and Research Centre (NATPAC)

== Major Initiatives ==
- Road safety improvement projects
  - Safe Kerala Project: A technology-driven road safety initiative implemented by the Motor Vehicles Department under the Government of Kerala to enhance traffic law enforcement and reduce road accidents across Kerala. The project uses AI-enabled traffic cameras and automated systems to detect violations and issue electronic challans, aiming to improve compliance and ensure safer roads.
- Modernisation of KSRTC bus fleet
- Implementation of e-transport services through MVD
- Digitalisation of licensing and vehicle registration services

== List of Ministers ==
References:

- K. B. Ganesh Kumar (2001-2003)
- R. Balakrishna Pillai (2003-2004)
- N. Sakthan (2004-2006)
- Mathew.T.Thomas (2006-2009)
- Jose Thettayil (2009)
- V. S. Sivakumar (2011-2012)
- Aryadan Muhammed (2012-2014)
- Thiruvanchoor Radhakrishnan (2014-2016)
- A. K. Saseendran (2016-2017), (2018-2021)
- Thomas Chandy (April - November 2017)
- Antony Raju (2021-2023)
- K. B. Ganesh Kumar (2023-2026)
- C. P. John (2026–present)

== See also ==
- Ministry of Road Transport and Highways, Government of India (MoRTH)
- Coastal Shipping and Inland Navigation Department, GoK
- List of departments and agencies of the Government of Kerala
