= Kerala Irrigation Infrastructure Development Corporation Limited =

- Company type: Public Sector Corporation, Government of Kerala
- Founded: 3 August 2000
- Headquarters: Thiruvananthapuram, Kerala, India
- Website: www.kiidc.kerala.gov.in

Kerala Irrigation Infrastructure Development Corporation Limited (KIIDC) is a wholly owned company of the Government of Kerala formed for the promotion and development of medium and large scale irrigation and water supply projects units in the State. It is the nodal agency for foreign and domestic investments in the irrigation sector in Kerala, KIIDC incorporated on 3 August 2000. This company is registered at Registrar of Companies, Ernakulam.

== Services ==
KIIDC provides comprehensive support for investors facilitating constant interaction between the government and the irrigation sector.

== Projects ==
=== Hilly Aqua packed drinking water ===
KIIDC sought to arrest the spiralling price of packaged drinking water in the state. The Government sanctioned the establishment of a drinking water bottle plant. Construction started in Mrala, Thodupuzha in 2014 and trial production began in 2015. Hilly Aqua has four outlets in Ernakulam district- Kakkanad, Kolencherry, Palichirangara and Nedumbassery.

== See also ==
- Public sector undertakings in Kerala
