= Kerala Motor Vehicles Department =

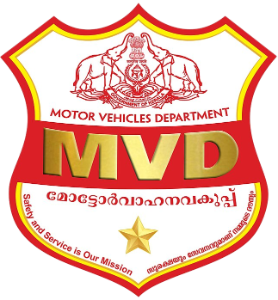
- Logo of Kerala MVD
- Abbreviation: MVD
- Motto: Safety, Service, Technology

Agency overview
- Formed: 01 June 1968; 58 years ago

Jurisdictional structure
- Operations jurisdiction: Kerala, India
- Governing body: Transport Department, Government of Kerala
- Constituting instruments: Section 213 of Motor Vehicles Act (1988); Kerala Motor Vehicles Taxation Act, 1976
- Specialist jurisdictions: Vehicle safety and hazardous material transport laws and regulations, licensing, registration, insurance; Highways, roads, traffic; Taxation

Operational structure
- Headquarters: Transport Commissionerate, Trans Towers, Vazhuthacaud, Thiruvananthapuram.
- Minister responsible: C. P. John, Minister for Transport
- Agency executives: Nagaraju Chakilam IPS, Transport Commissioner; P.S Pramoj Sanker IOFS, Additional Transport Commissioner
- RTOs: 18
- Sub RTOs: 69

Facilities
- Enforcement RTOs: 14

Website
- https://mvd.kerala.gov.in

The Kerala Motor Vehicles Department, colloquially known as the MVD or Kerala MVD, is the motor vehicle law enforcement agency under the Transport Department of the Government of Kerala. It is responsible for the enforcement of motor vehicle laws, issuing driving licences, registering motor vehicles, ensuring road safety, and the levy and collection of road tax in the state. The department is administered by the Transport Commissioner who is the Head of the Department. The current Transport Commissioner is Nagaraju Chakilam, IPS. It is one of the Government of Kerala's three major revenue-collecting departments.

It is primarily responsible for enforcing the Central Motor Vehicles Act, 1988, and its associated rules and regulations within the state of Kerala.

== Organization ==
=== Transport commissionerate ===
The Kerala MVD functions under the provisions of Section 213 of the Motor Vehicles Act, 1988. The headquarters of the Motor Vehicles Department, known as the Transport Commissionerate, is situated in Thiruvananthapuram.

The Motor Vehicles Department is headed by the Transport Commissioner, typically an IPS officer of the rank of Additional Director General of Police (ADGP). The current Transport Commissioner is CH Nagaraju IPS. The Transport Commissioner is assisted by the Additional Transport Commissioner, Joint Transport Commissioners and Deputy Transport Commissioners. At the Head Office, one Additional Transport Commissioner, two Joint Transport Commissioners, one Senior Deputy Transport Commissioners, one Assistant Transport Commissioner, and other ministerial and administrative officials assist the Transport Commissioner.

=== Zonal offices ===
There are four zonal offices headed by Deputy Transport Commissioners (Dy TCs).

Sl. No.	Zone	Administrative jurisdiction
1	South Zone (HQ: Thiruvananthapuram)	RTOs and Sub RTOs in Thiruvananthapuram, Kollam, Pathanamthitta, and Alappuzha districts
2	Central Zone-I (HQ: Thrissur)	RTOs and SRTOs in Thrissur, Palakkad, and Malappuram districts
3	Central Zone-II (HQ: Eranakulam)	RTOs and SRTOs in Kottayam, Idukki, and Ernakulam districts
4	North Zone (HQ: Kozhikode)	RTOs and SRTOs in Kozhikode, Kannur, Wayanad, and Kasaragod districts

=== Regional Transport Offices (RTOs) ===
The MVD has two functional wings: Enforcement Wing and Administration Wing.

There are 19 Regional Transport Offices (RTOs) responsible for transport administration, including vehicle registration, issuance of driving licences, and other vehicle- and licence-related services. It includes two Special RTOs located at Thiruvananthapuram—one for the nationalised sector (KSRTC vehicle registration) and another for government vehicles (KL-90).

=== Enforcement Regional Transport Offices ===
Kerala has 14 Enforcement Regional Transport Offices (RTOs), one in each district, responsible for road safety enforcement and the implementation of motor vehicle laws within their respective jurisdictions. The MVD Enforcement Wing comprises 14 RTOs, 65 Motor Vehicle Inspectors and 187 Assistant Motor Vehicles Inspectors.

=== Sub Regional Transport Offices ===
Sub-regional Transport Offices are headed by joint regional transport officers (JRTOs). There are 68 SRTO offices across the state.

Sanctioned strength of the Motor Vehicles Department (MVD)
Category	Post	Sanctioned strength
Executive	Transport Commissioner	1
Executive	Additional / Joint Transport Commissioner	1
Executive	Senior Deputy Transport Commissioner & Secretary, State Transport Authority	1
Executive	Senior Deputy Transport Commissioner (Tax)	1
Executive	Assistant Transport Commissioner	1
Executive	Zonal Deputy Transport Commissioners	4
Executive	Regional Transport Officers	18
Executive	Joint Regional Transport Officers	42
Executive	Motor Vehicle Inspectors	126
Executive	Assistant Motor Vehicle Inspectors	286
Non-executive	Administrative Officer	1
Non-executive	Law Officer	1
Non-executive	Finance Officer	1
Non-executive	Statistical Officer	1
Non-executive	Accounts Officer	1
Non-executive	Senior Superintendents	31
Non-executive	Junior Superintendents	49
Non-executive	Head Accountant / PRO / Head Clerk	117
Non-executive	Clerks (LD & UD)	614

== Functions and responsibilities ==
- Enforcement of motor vehicle laws and traffic regulations
- Issue and renewal of driving licences and learner's licences
- Registration of motor vehicles and issue of Registration Certificates
- Transfer of ownership and change of address in registration records
- Issue and renewal of permits for transport and commercial vehicles
- Conduct of vehicle fitness tests and certification
- Levy and collection of motor vehicle tax and road tax
- Assignment of registration marks and issue of number plates
- Regulation and monitoring of public transport vehicles
- Road safety promotion, accident prevention and traffic enforcement initiatives

== Rank structure ==
The following is the rank structure of the executive cadre of the Department:

Title	Insignia	Notes
Transport Commissioner		Post held by an IPS officer on deputation.
Additional Transport Commissioner		Ex-cadre post
Joint Transport Commissioner (Jt. TC)		Managerial/administrative role
Senior Deputy Transport Commissioner (Sr. Dy. TC)		Managerial/administrative role
Deputy Transport Commissioner (Dy. TC)		Zonal-level supervisory officer.
Regional Transport Officer (RTO) / Assistant Transport Commissioner (ATC)		Head of a Regional Transport Office
Joint Regional Transport Officer (Jt. RTO)		Head of a Sub-Regional Transport Office
Motor Vehicles Inspector (MVI)		Field-level executive officer
Assistant Motor Vehicles Inspector (AMVI)		Entry-level executive post

== Initiatives ==
=== Technological Advancements: AI Cameras (2023-Present) ===
In 2023, the Kerala Motor Vehicles Department (MVD) became the first transport department in India to implement a large-scale Artificial Intelligence (AI) camera system for traffic violation detection and road safety enforcement. This initiative, known as the "Safe Kerala" scheme, involved the installation of 726 cameras across the state. The AI cameras detect violations such as not wearing helmets and seat belts, overspeeding, careless driving, three people travelling on a two-wheeler among others.

Out of the total cameras, 692 were designated for automated fine imposition. During a trial run period, these cameras successfully identified a significant number of traffic violations. MVD officials reported capturing around 4.5 lakh violations, with some cameras detecting as many as 2,500 offenses daily. Following the official launch in April 2023, the number of violations captured by the cameras reportedly dropped to around 2 lakh per day, suggesting a positive impact on driver behavior.

== Controversies ==
- Police–MVD enforcement dispute: In July 2026, a Motor Vehicles Department Enforcement Officer in Wadakkanchery, Thrissur, issued a challan to a Kerala Police patrol vehicle, alleging that it lacked valid vehicle insurance and a Pollution Under Control (PUC) certificate. The police subsequently registered a case against the enforcement inspector, alleging obstruction of official duty after the incident escalated. The incident received widespread media attention and highlighted a public dispute between the two enforcement agencies.
- In a recent dispute between the Kerala Motor Vehicles Department (MVD) and the Kerala State Electricity Board (KSEB), tensions escalated after the MVD imposed a significant fine on a KSEB contract vehicle for various traffic violations. The fine was issued based on evidence captured by AI-powered traffic surveillance cameras. In retaliation, the KSEB reportedly cut power supply to MVD offices in certain regions, leading to disruptions in the department's operations. While the KSEB claimed the power cut was a routine procedure due to non-payment of bills, there were allegations that it was a deliberate act of retaliation.

== See also ==
- Government of Kerala
- Kerala Police
- Transport Department, Government of Kerala
- Ministry of Road Transport and Highways (MoRTH), Government of India
- Kerala Road Safety Authority
