= N. Samsudheen =

Indian politician

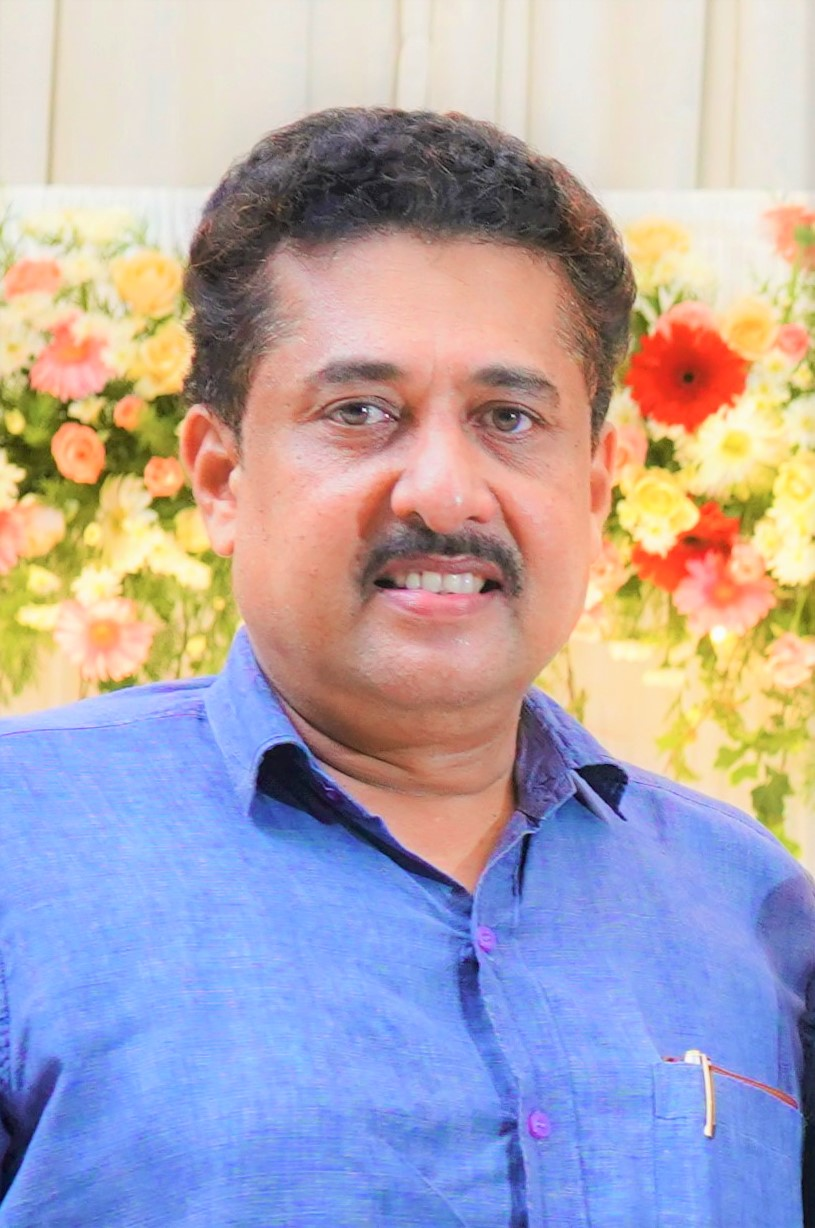
- Samsudheen in 2026

Minister for General Education and Minority Welfare, Government of Kerala
- Incumbent
- Assumed office 18 May 2026
- Governor: Rajendra Arlekar
- Chief minister: V.D. Satheesan
- Portfolio(s): See list: General Education; Literacy Movement; Wakf and Haj Pilgrimage; Minority Welfare
- Preceded by: V. Sivankutty (General Education); V. Abdurahiman (Minority Welfare)

Member of Kerala Legislative Assembly
- Incumbent
- Assumed office 14 May 2011
- Preceded by: Jose Baby
- Constituency: Mannarkkad (State Assembly constituency)

Personal details
- Born: 31 May 1969 (age 57) Murivazhikkal, Paravanna, Tirur, Kerala, India
- Party: Indian Union Muslim League
- Spouse: Rafitha K. P.
- Children: Shaharzad
- Education: Bachelor of Laws; Master of Commerce
- Alma mater: Thunchan Memorial Government College, Tirur, Pocker Sahib Memorial Orphanage College Tirurangadi, Government Law College, Kozhikode

N. Samsudheen is an Indian politician serving as the Minister for General Education and Minority Welfare in the Government of Kerala.He has represented Mannarkkad in the Kerala Legislative Assembly since 2011 and is currently a member of the 16th Kerala Legislative Assembly. He is a member of the Indian Union Muslim League.

== Biography ==
N. Samsudheen was born in Paravanna, Tirur, Kerala, India on 31 May 1969 to Mohammed Kutty and Mariyakutty. He attended the Govt. High School Paravanna and holds B.Com. degree from Thunchan Memorial Government College, M.Com. degree from Pocker Sahib Memorial Orphanage College and LL.B. degree from Government Law College, Kozhikode. He was successively elected to the Kerala Legislative Assembly from Mannarkkad (State Assembly constituency) in 2011, 2016 ,2021 and 2026 elections.

Kerala Legislative Assembly
Year	Constituency	Party	Votes	%	Opponent	Opponent party	Votes	%	Margin	Margin in %	Result
2011	Mannarkkad	IUML	60,191	49.66	V. Chamunni	CPI	51,921	42.84	8,270	6.82%	Won
2016	Mannarkkad	IUML	73,163	49.27	K. P. Suresh Raj	CPI	60,838	40.97	12,325	8.30%	Won
2021	Mannarkkad	IUML	71,657	47.11	K. P. Suresh Raj	CPI	65,787	43.25	5,870	3.86%	Won
2026	Mannarkkad	IUML	90,606	53.70	Manzil Aboobacker	CPI	64,703	38.30	25,903	15.40%	Won
