= Department of Water Resources (Kerala) =

Water resources management department in Kerala

Department overview
- Jurisdiction: Kerala, India
- Headquarters: Thiruvananthapuram, Kerala
- Annual budget: ₹953.7631 crore (US$99 million) (2026–27, revised)
- Minister responsible: Mons Joseph, Minister for Water Resources
- Department executive: Biswanath Sinha IAS, Additional Chief Secretary (Water Resources)
- Parent department: Government of Kerala
- Child agencies: Kerala Water Authority; Irrigation Department
- Website: waterresources.kerala.gov.in

The Department of Water Resources is an administrative department of the Government of Kerala responsible for the management, conservation, distribution, and regulation of surface and groundwater resources across the state. The department oversees irrigation development, dam and reservoir management, flood control activities, inter-state water sharing management, and planning of water infrastructure projects.

The department formulates policies, executes major and minor irrigation projects, monitors river basins, and manages water-related infrastructure through multiple specialised agencies, boards, and missions. Its headquarters is located in Thiruvananthapuram, Kerala.

== Ministerial Team ==
The Water Resources Department is headed by a Cabinet Minister of the Government of Kerala, and the incumbent Minister is Roshy Augustine.

Administratively, the department is headed by an Additional Chief Secretary to Government, an officer of the Indian Administrative Service (IAS).

== Functions ==
The Department of Water Resources is responsible for:

- Policy formulation on irrigation and water management.
- Construction and maintenance of dams, reservoirs, and irrigation canals.
- Groundwater development and regulation through appropriate authorities.
- Implementation of flood control and river bank protection activities.
- Inter-state water sharing negotiation and dispute resolution (where applicable).
- Administration of water resources missions, authorities, and project implementation units.

== Subordinate Organizations ==
=== Directorates / Field Departments ===
- Irrigation Department
- Ground Water Department
- Water Resources Management Directorate (WRMD)

=== Autonomous Bodies / Corporations ===
- Kerala Water Authority (KWA)
- Kerala Water Resources Development Corporation (KWRDC)
- Kerala Irrigation Infrastructure Development Corporation (KIIDC)
- Command Area Development Authority (CADA)

=== Major Projects & Missions ===
- Major & Minor Irrigation Projects
- Dam Rehabilitation and Improvement Project (DRIP)
- River Rejuvenation & Basin Development Initiatives

== Water Infrastructure ==
The Department of Water Resources oversees the management and maintenance of dams, reservoirs, canals, and irrigation infrastructure in Kerala.

See: List of dams and reservoirs in India

Sl. No.	Infrastructure Category	Total	Managed by
1	Dams & Reservoirs	81	Irrigation Department
2	Major Irrigation Projects	3	Irrigation Department
3	Medium Irrigation Projects	37	Irrigation Department
4	Minor Irrigation Schemes	240+	Ground Water Department / Irrigation Dept.
5	Lift Irrigation Schemes	120+	Irrigation Department / KIIDC
