= Department of Coastal Shipping and Inland Navigation (Kerala) =

Government department of Kerala, India

- Emblem of Kerala

Department overview
- Jurisdiction: Government of Kerala
- Headquarters: Government Secretariat, Thiruvananthapuram, Kerala, India
- Minister responsible: V.D. Satheesan, Minister for Coastal Shipping and Inland Navigation
- Department executive: Rathan U Kelkar, IAS, Secretary, Coastal Shipping and Inland Navigation Department
- Child Department: Kerala Shipping and Inland Navigation Corporation

The Coastal Shipping and Inland Navigation Department is an administrative department under the Government of Kerala, responsible for the development and regulation of water-based transportation systems, including inland waterways, ferry services, coastal shipping, and navigation infrastructure. The department is responsible for the development and promotion of inland waterways, ferry services, and coastal shipping for the transport of passengers and cargo through rivers, canals, backwaters, and coastal routes.

It has its headquarters in Government Secretariat, Thiruvananthapuram.

== History ==
The Kerala Shipping and Inland Navigation Corporation is the operational agency responsible for inland navigation. It is a Government of Kerala undertaking, created in 1989 by the amalgamation of the Kerala Shipping Corporation (KSC) established in 1974, and the Kerala Inland Navigation Corporation (KINCO) established in 1975.

== Functions ==
The following are the administrative functions of the department;

- Inland Water Transport
- Construction of Waterways (Inland Navigation)
- Development and promotion of coastal shipping and all related activities except implementation of Kerala Inland Vessels Rules 2010 and related matters.
- Administration of Kerala Shipping and Inland Navigation Corporation Ltd.

== See also ==
- Department of Fisheries and Ports (Kerala)
- Department of Transport (Kerala)
