= Kerala Shipping and Inland Navigation Corporation =

State-owned company in Kerala, India

- Type: Public
- Industry: Shipping & Water Transport
- Predecessor: Kerala Inland Navigation Corporation (KINCO); Kerala Shipping Corporation
- Headquarters: Kochi, India
- Key people: K. T. Chacko (Chairman); R. Girija (Managing Director)
- Parent: Coastal Shipping and Inland Navigation Department
- Website: www.ksinc.in

Kerala Shipping and Inland Navigation Corporation (KSINC) is a Government of Kerala undertaking that oversees the shipping and inland navigation matters of the state. It is headquartered in Kochi. It was formed in 1989 by the amalgamation of the Kerala Inland Navigation Corporation (KINCO) established in 1975, and the Kerala Shipping Corporation (KSC) established in 1974.

== Activities ==
KSINC is engaged in the fields of transportation of passenger and cargo through the inland waterways of Kerala, Backwater tourism and construction and maintenance of small vessels and crafts.

=== Cargo services ===
KSINC barges carries bulk materials, potable water, petroleum products, acids and other materials through the inland waterways in Kerala and coastal region. KSINC caters to the needs of clients like FACT, IOC, KRL and BPCL. The company has a fleet of vessels. The vessels are constructed for navigation in the inland waters of the state. The company operates more than 10 barges for movement of bulk and liquid cargo through the inland waterways of the state. KSINC water barges supplies about one million liters of drinking water every day to Vypin, Murukkkumpadom, Panambukad, Vallarpadom and other islands around Kochi.

=== Construction and maintenance ===
KSINC has been constructing passenger boats, speed boats, house boats, tourist boats and small seagoing vessels. It constructs the vessels using wood, steel or FRP as per the requirements of customers. KSINC also has experience in repair (both hull and machinery) of large variety vessels. KSINC has a slipway, where vessels of weight up to 200 MTs can be hauled up and repaired. There are facilities to dock six vessels at a time. Facilities for manufacture, repair and servicing of seagoing and inland navigation vessels are available.

=== Tourism ===
KSINC operates a number of tourist boats and speed boats. The company also offers a sailing resort, "Lake Princess", with night accommodation for 16 persons.

=== Bunkering services ===
The company is engaged in bunker supplies to ships in the Cochin Port area since 1989. The company has ongoing contract for the delivery of fuel to ships with the Indian Oil Corporation Ltd. KSINC is also executing occasional bunker calls from the Bharat Petroleum Corporation. KSINC is also exploring the potential for outer bunkering.

== See also ==
- MV Kairali
- Borders of India
- Climate of India
- Coastal India
- Exclusive economic zone of India
- Fishing in India
- Outline of India
