= Department of Co-operation (Kerala) =

Co-operative sector administrative department in Kerala

Department overview
- Jurisdiction: Kerala, India
- Headquarters: Thiruvananthapuram, Kerala, India
- Annual budget: ₹666.6489 crore (US$69 million) (2026–27, revised)
- Minister responsible: M. Liju, Minister for Co-operation
- Department executives: Dr. Veena N Madhavan IAS, Special Secretary to Government (Co-operation); Dr. D. Sajith Babu IAS, Registrar of Co-operative Societies
- Parent department: Government of Kerala
- Website: cooperation.kerala.gov.in

The Department of Co-operation is an administrative department of the Government of Kerala, responsible for the development, regulation, and supervision of the co-operative sector in the state. The department oversees all registered co-operative societies, including co-operative banks, credit societies, marketing societies, and sector-specific cooperative institutions.

The department ensures implementation of cooperative policies, facilitates financial assistance, regulates registration of societies, and enforces the provisions of the Kerala Co-operative Societies Act, 1969. It plays a significant role in rural development, agricultural credit, and the cooperative banking structure in Kerala.

== Leadership ==
The department is headed by a Cabinet Minister of the Government of Kerala, and the current Minister for Co-operation is M. Liju.

The administrative head of the department is the Special Secretary to Government (Co-operation), an IAS officer. The Secretary oversees policy formulation, administrative decisions, and coordination with field agencies.

The operational authority for co-operative administration and regulation lies with the Registrar of Co-operative Societies, who is responsible for supervision of all registered cooperative societies in the state. The current Registrar of Co-operative Societies is Dr. D.Sajith Babu IAS.

== Functional Structure ==
=== Registrar of Co-operative Societies (RCS) ===
The Registrar of Co-operative Societies exercises statutory powers for:

- Registration and regulation of co-operative societies.
- Conduct of elections to society governing bodies.
- Audit and inspection of co-operative institutions.
- Supervision and enforcement under the Kerala Co-operative Societies Act, 1969 and Rules, 1969.

District-level cooperative administration is carried out by District Co-operative Officers, Joint Registrars, and Assistant Registrars.

== Functions ==
The major functions of the Department include:

- Registration, supervision, and inspection of co-operative societies.
- Promotion and development of co-operative institutions across various sectors (agriculture, dairy, banking, consumer, housing, etc.).
- Implementation of cooperative development policies and welfare schemes.
- Ensuring transparency and accountability in co-operative institutions.
- Financial support and credit facilitation through cooperative banks and apex agencies.

== Subordinate Institutions ==
=== Directorates / Field Offices ===
- Office of the Registrar of Co-operative Societies (RCS)
- District Co-operative Offices (14 districts)

== Apex and Allied Institutions ==
The organisations under the Co-operative Department are classified into:

- Apex co-operative institutions under the administrative control of the Registrar of Co-operative Societies
- Apex institutions under Functional Registrars (sector-specific co-operative institutions)
- Other Regional and State-wide co-operative institutions

=== Apex Institutions under the Administrative Control of Registrar of Co-operative Societies ===
1. Kerala State Cooperative Bank (Kerala Bank) – keralabank.co.in
2. Kerala State Cooperative Agricultural and Rural Development Bank – keralalandbank.in
3. Kerala State Cooperative Consumer Federation (Consumerfed) – consumerfed.net
4. Kerala State Cooperative Marketing Federation (Marketfed) – marketfed.com/2019/
5. Kerala State Cooperative Rubber Marketing Federation (Rubbermark) – www.rubbermark.com
6. Kerala State Cooperative Housing Federation (Housefed)
7. Kerala State Cooperative Hospital Federation (Hospitalfed)
8. Kerala State SC/ST Development Federation (SC/ST Fed) – sctfed.com
9. Kerala Women Cooperative Federation (Vanithafed) – www.vanithafedkerala.com
10. Kerala State Cooperative Labour Cooperative Federation (Labourfed)
11. Kerala State Cooperative Tourism Federation (Tourfed) – tourfed.org

=== Apex Institutions under Functional Registrars ===
1. Kerala State Handloom Weavers Co-operative Society (Hantex)www.hantex.kerala.gov.in
2. Kerala State Co-operative Coir Marketing Federation (Coirfed) – coirfed.com
3. Kerala Cooperative Milk Marketing Federation (MILMA) – www.milma.com
4. Kerala State Cooperative Fish Marketing Federation (Matsyafed) – matsyafed.in
5. Kerala State Textile Co-operative Federation (Texfed) – texfed.kerala.gov.in
6. Kerala State Cashew Workers Apex Industrial Cooperative Society (CAPEX) – www.cashewcapex.com
7. Kerala Handicrafts Apex Co-operative Society (SURABHI)
8. Kerala State Rural Women's Electronics Industrial Co-operative Federation (RUTRONIX) – keralastaterutronix.com
9. Kerala Coconut Farmers Co-operative Federation (Kerafed) – www.kerafed.com

=== Regional and State-wide Co-operative Institutions ===
1. Regional Agro Industrial Development Corporation (RAIDCO) – www.raidco.in
2. Kerala State Rubber Co-operative Ltd (RUBCO) – www.rubcogroup.com
3. Kerala Dinesh Beedi Central Co-operative Society – www.keraladinesh.com
4. Kerala State Co-operative Institute of Information Technology (COSTECH) – www.costech.in
5. Kerala State Engineering & Transport Development Co-operative Society (KETCO)
6. Artisans Development Corporation (ARTCO)
7. Co-operative Insurance Society (COINS) – coinskerala.com
8. Kerala State Engineering and Infrastructure Service Co-operative Society (KEISCO)
9. Kerala State Legal Metrology Licensees and Technicians Co-operative Society
10. Kerala State Pravasi Welfare Development Co-operative Society (PRAVASIS Ltd) – pravasisltd.com
11. Kerala State Pravasi Welfare and Development Co-operative Society – pravasicoop.com
12. Kerala Tourism Development Co-operative Society

=== Regional and State-wide Institutions under Functional Registrars ===
1. Thiruvananthapuram Regional Co-operative Milk Producers Union (TRCMPU) – milmatrcmpu.com
2. Ernakulam Regional Co-operative Milk Producers Union (ERCMPU) – ercmpu.in
3. Malabar Regional Co-operative Milk Producers Union (MRCMPU) – www.mrcmpu.com
4. Kerala State Agro Co-operative Ltd (AGREENCO)
