= Department of Law (Kerala) =

Government department of Kerala, India

Law Department, Government of Kerala
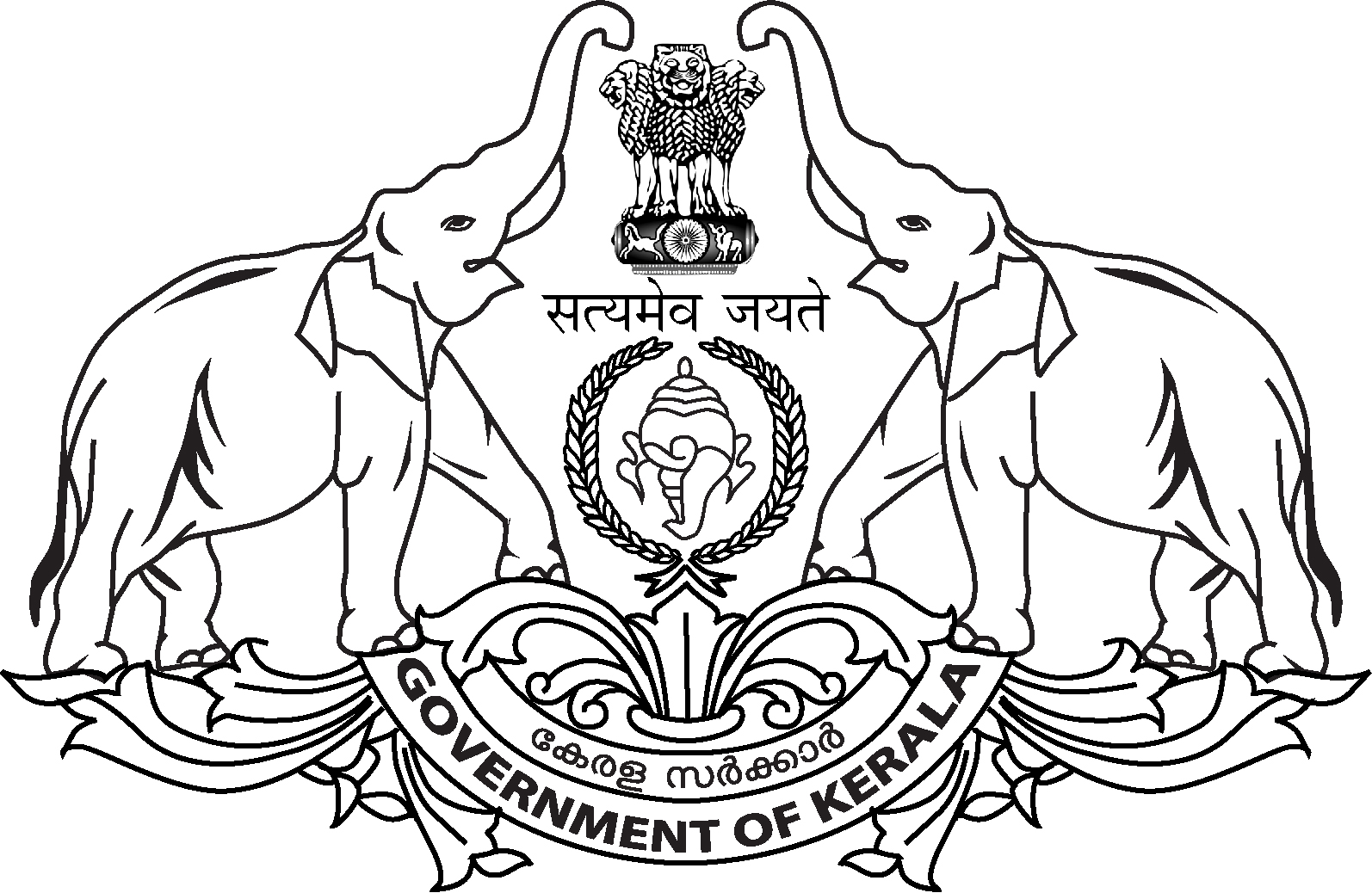

Department overview
- Headquarters: Government Secretariat, Thiruvananthapuram
- Minister responsible: V.D. Satheesan, Minister for Law
- Department executive: K. G. Sanal Kumar, Law Secretary
- Website: https://lawsect.kerala.gov.in/

The Law Department is a department of the Government of Kerala responsible for the legal and legislative affairs of the State. The Law Department functions as a distinct and independent department within the Government Secretariat, entrusted with the legal and legislative responsibilities of the State Government. It has its headquarters in Kerala Government Secretariat, Thiruvananthapuram.

== Governance and administration ==
The department is under the charge of the minister for law. The incumbent minister for law is V. D. Satheesan, the chief minister of Kerala.

It is administratively headed by the Law Secretary, supported by additional, joint, deputy, and under secretaries at the Secretariat.

The Law Secretary is usually a judicial officer, unlike in other government departments where the Secretary to Government is typically an IAS officer. The incumbent Law Secretary to Government is K. G. Sanal Kumar.

Senior law officers of the Government of Kerala
Office	Incumbent(s)
Advocate General of Kerala	K. Jaju Babu
Additional Advocate Generals	Sri. Asok M. Cherian; Sri. K. P. Jayachandran
State Attorney	Anoop V Nair
Director General of Prosecution and State Public Prosecutor (DGP)	T. Asaf Ali

== Functions ==
The department provides legal advice to the Government, drafts and scrutinises legislation, ordinances, rules, and notifications, and handles matters related to government litigation.

- General administration of the department
- Legislative drafting and related work, including:
  - Preparation of legislative proposals
  - Legislative project
  - Legislation
  - Unification of laws
- Legal advice to government departments
- Subsidiary Legislation
- Publications, including statutory materials
- Translation of legal and legislative documents

Administrative matters related to Government Law Officers;

The Law department administers Government Law Officers (Appointment and Conditions of Service) and Conduct of Cases rules, 1978.

- Advocate General of Kerala
- Additional Advocates General (Addl.AGs)
- State Attorney / State Public Prosecutor (Director General of Prosecution)
- Additional State Public Prosecutor
- Administrator General & Official Trustee

== Autonomous institutions ==
- Office of the Advocate General, Kerala
- Kerala State Human Rights Commission (KSHRC)
- Kerala State Legal Services Authority (KeLSA)

== See also ==
- Government of Kerala
- Directorate of Prosecution (Kerala)
- Kerala Legislative Assembly
- Department of Personnel and Administrative Reforms (Kerala)
- Department of Parliamentary Affairs (Kerala)
- High Court of Kerala
