= General Administration Department (Kerala) =

Government department of Kerala

Department overview
- Jurisdiction: Kerala, India
- Headquarters: Kerala Government Secretariat, Thiruvananthapuram
- Minister responsible: V. D. Satheesan, Chief Minister of Keralam and Minister for General Administration
- Department executives: Biswanath Sinha, I.A.S., Chief Secretary to Government; K. Biju IAS, Secretary (General Administration)
- Child Department: GAD (All India Services) Department; GAD (Parliament Section) Department; GAD (Protocol) Department
- Website: gad.kerala.gov.in

The Department of General Administration (GAD) is an administrative department under the Government of Kerala. It functions as the central coordinating department of the state government and handles the overall administration of the Government Secretariat, personnel matters of Indian Administrative Service (IAS), Indian Police Service (IPS), and Indian Forest Service (IFS) officers, ceremonial functions of the state, and other key administrative responsibilities. The department functions under the leadership of the Chief Minister of Kerala and is administratively headed by the Chief Secretary.

The department plays a key role in administrative reforms, rules of business, protocol matters, cabinet affairs, and services of senior government officers. The headquarters of the department is located at the Government Secretariat, Thiruvananthapuram.

== Leadership ==
The General Administration Department (GAD) is typically overseen by the Chief Minister. The incumbent minister incharge is the Chief Minister, V. D. Satheesan.

Administratively, the department is headed by the Chief Secretary to Government, an IAS officer. The Chief Secretary is supported by Secretaries, Additional Secretaries, Deputy Secretaries, Under Secretaries, and other Secretariat staff.

== Functions ==
The major functions of the General Administration Department include:

- Coordination and control of Secretariat administration and inter-departmental matters.
- Administration of IAS, IPS and IFS cadre management, postings, transfers, and related personnel matters.
- Processing of matters related to Cabinet meetings, Cabinet decisions, and official procedures.
- State protocol, including visits of the President of India, Prime Minister of India, and foreign dignitaries.
- Appointment of heads of departments, key administrative officers, and senior management in government institutions.
- Budgeting and administration of Secretariat establishment and services.

== Sub-divisions ==
The department operates through various specialized sections, including:

- Governor, Council of Ministers, High Court and Public Service Commission
  - Matters relating to the swearing-in of the Governor and Ministers.
  - Rules of Business of the Government of Kerala and Secretariat Instructions.
  - Allocation of business among Ministers.
  - Cabinet matters.
  - Issue of notifications regarding the resignation of Ministers.
  - Matters relating to the Code of Conduct of Ministers.
  - Notifications relating to the appointment of the Chief Justice and Judges of the High Court.
  - Matters relating to the establishment of Raj Bhavan and the Governor’s household.
  - Matters relating to the Kerala Public Service Commission, including the appointment of the Chairman and Members, amendments to service regulations, and related matters.
  - Pension scheme for the personal staff of Ministers, the Leader of the Opposition, and the Government Chief Whip.
- All India Services (AIS)
  - Establishment matters of All India Services officers such as Indian Administrative Service, Indian Police Service, Indian Forest Service.
  - Promotion, Transfer, Deputation, and related matters of IAS, IPS, IFS officers.
- Secretariat Administration
  - Secretariat personnel, including appointments, postings and transfers of all categories of officers in the Administrative Secretariat and officers of and above the rank of Under Secretary in the Law and Finance Departments
  - General matters relating to Secretariat administration, accommodation, accounts, contingencies, Central Library, records and directory
  - Modernising Government Programme Mission
  - Formation and related matters of a corporation for economically backward sections of forward communities
- Political
  - Matters relating to national integration, national emergency, privileges to ex-rulers, freedom fighters’ pension, Southern Zonal Council meetings, and memoranda and resolutions of a general nature.
  - Matters relating to the National Flag Code of India.
  - Matters relating to the Emblems and Names Act.
- Protocol and Hospitality
  - Visits of VIPs and other important persons, including protocol and hospitality arrangements.
  - Matters relating to the Warrant of Precedence.
  - Ceremonial matters.
  - Action to be taken on the death of high dignitaries.
  - General instructions relating to VIP security.
- Minorities
  - Linguistic minorities
- Other matters
  - Arrangements for conducting examinations of the Union Public Service Commission and the Staff Selection Commission in Kerala.
  - Matters relating to civil and military awards, including the Padma Awards, Ashoka Chakra, Kirti Chakra, Shaurya Chakra, and Jeevan Raksha Padak.
  - Matters relating to the Cypher Bureau.
  - Preparation and publication of administrative reports.
  - Declaration of State holidays, special holidays, and holidays under the Negotiable Instruments Act.
  - Annual conference of Collectors and Heads of Departments.
  - General matters relating to exhibitions.
- Information and Public Relation
- Chief Minister’s Public Grievance Redressal Cell

== See also ==
- List of departments and agencies of the Government of Kerala
