= Department of Information and Public Relations (Kerala) =

Government agency

Information & Public Relations Department, Keralam

Agency overview
- Formed: 1956
- Preceding agency: Department of Public Relations
- Jurisdiction: Government of Kerala
- Headquarters: Ground Floor, South Block, Government Secretariat, Thiruvananthapuram, Kerala, India
- Annual budget: ₹124.4003 crore (US$13 million) (2026–27) (Revised)
- Minister responsible: V.D. Satheesan, Chief Minister of Kerala
- Agency executives: Sabin Sameed IAS, Director
- Website: prd.kerala.gov.in

The Information & Public Relations Department (I&PRD) is the nodal agency for information services, public relations, and media management for the Government of Kerala,Established in 1956, the department serves as the primary communication link between the state government and the general public.

== History ==
The department was established immediately following the formation of Kerala State in 1956, originally operating under the name "Department of Public Relations" with the motto "Serving information real-time." It was later renamed the Information and Public Relations Department to reflect its expanding scope in handling modern media systems and state-wide public relations interventions.

== Functions and responsibilities ==
The I&PRD is tasked with disseminating information on government policies, welfare schemes, and developmental programs, while simultaneously gathering public feedback to assist administrative policy formulation. Its core operations are split across several functional areas:

=== Media and press relations ===
- Press Releases: The Press Release division handles direct daily news feeds from the Directorate and District Information Offices to all major mainstream media houses.
- Audio-Visual Documentation: The department provides comprehensive audio-visual coverage of all official government programs and handles the production and live broadcasting of the Chief Minister's press conferences.
- Advertising: Functions as the central professional agency for routing all government advertisements to print, electronic, and digital media, including the formulation of tariff rates.

=== Digital and new media ===
The Web & New Media division manages the digital footprint of the state administration, which includes:

- Maintenance of the Official Kerala State Government Portal, the core I&PRD portals, and dedicated websites for the Chief Minister, state ministers, and specific events e.g.Official sabarimala Temple Portal.
- Operation of the PRD Live mobile application, which broadcasts live events and emergency updates, alongside official results for state examinations (SSLC, HSE) and elections.
- Fact Check Division: A specialized cell established to identify fake news circulating on social media platforms, verifying and authenticating content in coordination with respective state authorities. Official Kerala State Factcheck Portal

=== Publications ===
The department produces periodic and annual publications to document state affairs:

- Samakaalika Janapadam – A monthly cultural and developmental magazine published in Malayalam.
- Kerala Calling – A monthly developmental magazine published in English.
- Media Handbook – An annual reference publication containing contact details for various state ministries, departments, and media houses.

=== Broadcasting and electronic media ===
The department produces dedicated programming for television and radio channels:

- Naam Munnottu – A weekly interactive television program featuring the Chief Minister, telecast across Doordarshan and private regional channels.
- Priya Keralam – A news-oriented weekly program broadcast on DD Malayalam.
- Janapadham – A radio documentary series broadcast via All India Radio (AIR) FM channels.
- Radio Kerala – An internet-based streaming radio service operated by the department.

=== Journalist welfare and accreditation ===
The I&PRD is the authorized body responsible for issuing media accreditation to journalists in the state. It also administers welfare schemes, including journalist and non-journalist pensions for retired newspaper establishment employees, and provides financial distress relief to journalists and their dependents.

== Structure ==
The department is administratively headed by a Secretary to the Government, while day-to-day operations are managed by a Director. The Director is assisted by Additional Directors, Deputy Directors, Information Officers, and Assistant Editors.

=== Divisions ===
The department executes its mandates through 17 specialized divisions:

Sl. No.	Division Name
1	Advertisement (Print)
2	Advertisement (Electronic Media)
3	Audio-Video Documentation
4	Circulation & Distribution
5	Co-ordinating News Editor
6	Cultural Development
7	English Editorial
8	Field Publicity
9	Malayalam Editorial
10	Journalist & Non-Journalist Pension
11	Photography
12	Planning & Development
13	Press Release
14	Programme Production
15	Research & Reference
16	Scrutiny
17	Web & New Media

=== Regional presence ===
The Directorate of I&PRD is located within the South Block of the Government Secretariat in Thiruvananthapuram. To ensure localized state coverage, the department operates 14 District Information Offices at their respective district headquarters, alongside a dedicated Information Office located at Kerala House in New Delhi to handle national media coordination.

== See also ==
- Government of Kerala
- Kerala Media Academy
