= Department of Non-Resident Keralites Affairs =

Kerala government agency

Department of Non-Resident Keralites Affairs of State of Kerala (NORKA ROOTS)
Agency overview
- Formed: 6 December 1996; 29 years ago
- Jurisdiction: Kerala
- Headquarters: Thiruvananthapuram, Kerala, India
- Minister responsible: V. D. Satheesan, Minister for NORKA
- Agency executives: T. V. Anupama, IAS, Secretary to Government; Ajith Kolassery, CEO
- Website: https://norkaroots.kerala.gov.in/

The Non-Resident Keralites Affairs abbreviated as NORKA is a department of the Government of Kerala formed on 6 December 1996 to redress the grievances of Non-Resident Keralites (NRKs). It is the first of its kind formed in any Indian state. The department was formed in an attempt to strengthen the relationship between the NRKs and the Government of Kerala and to improve the administrative framework. The field agency of NORKA is known as the NORKA Roots, which was set up in 2002 to act as an interface between the NRKs and the Government of Kerala. It also acts as a forum for addressing problems amongst non-resident Keralites, safeguarding their rights and assisting returnees.

Amidst the COVID-19 pandemic, the NORKA-Roots portal facilitated registration from people all around the world to request to return to Kerala. The portal also allowed people stuck in different states of the country to register on their site from 29 April 2020.
