= Department of Minority Welfare (Kerala) =

Government department in Kerala, India

Department overview
- Jurisdiction: India Kerala
- Headquarters: Thiruvananthapuram
- Minister responsible: N. Samsudheen, Minister for General Education and Minority Welfare
- Department executives: Minhaj Alam, IAS, Secretary to Government; Sabin Sameed, IAS, Director
- Parent department: Government of Kerala
- Website: https://minoritywelfare.kerala.gov.in/

The Department of Minority Welfare is an administrative department of the Government of Kerala. The department is responsible for formulating and implementing policies aimed at the welfare of minority communities, including Muslims, Christians, Buddhists, Sikhs, Jains, and Parsis. It has its headquarters in Government Secretariat, Thiruvananthapuram.

== Leadership ==
The Minority Welfare Department is headed by a Cabinet Minister of the Government of Kerala. The incumbent Minister for Minority Welfare is N. Samsudheen, who also holds the portfolio of General Education.

The department is administratively headed by a Secretary to Government, who is an IAS officer. The current Secretary to Government is Minhaj Alam IAS.

== Line departments ==
- Directorate of Minority Welfare: The Directorate is the nodal agency for implementing both Central and State schemes and projects intended for uplifting the minority communities in the state. The Directorate of Minority Welfare Department is located in Thiruvananthapuram.

== Major institutions ==
- Kerala State Commission for Minorities
- Kerala State Hajj Committee
- Kerala State Waqf Board
- Kerala Madrassa Teacher's Welfare Fund Board
- Kerala State Minority Development Finance Corporation
- Minority Youth Training Centers.
