= C. P. John =

Indian politician

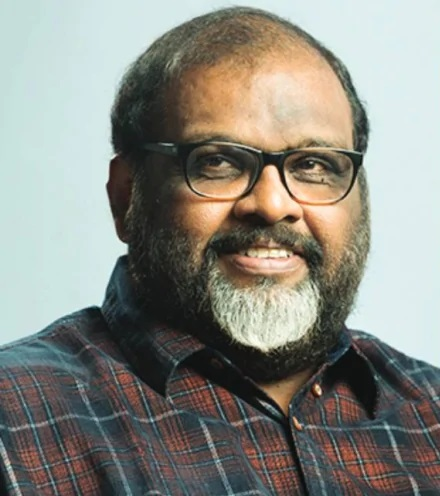

Minister for Transport, Government of Kerala
- Incumbent
- Assumed office 18 May 2026
- Governor: Rajendra Arlekar
- Chief Minister: V. D. Satheesan
- Portfolio(s): See list: Road Transport; Motor Vehicles; Water Transport
- Preceded by: K. B. Ganesh Kumar

Member of the Kerala Legislative Assembly
- Incumbent
- Assumed office 4 May 2026
- Preceded by: Antony Raju
- Constituency: Thiruvananthapuram

General Secretary of the Communist Marxist Party
- Incumbent
- Assumed office December 2014
- Preceded by: M. V. Raghavan

Personal details
- Born: 22 April 1957 (age 69) Kunnamkulam, Thrissur, Kerala, India
- Party: Communist Marxist Party
- Parent(s): C. I. Poulose, Rosa
- Education: Government Law College, Kozhikode
- Occupation: Politician, Social Worker, Lawyer

C. Poulose John (born 22 April 1957) is an Indian politician and lawyer, who is currently serving as the Minister of Transport in the Government of Kerala and as a Member of the Kerala Legislative Assembly from Thiruvananthapuram since 2026. He is the General Secretary of the Communist Marxist Party Kerala State Committee (CMPKSC). Currently, John is the only communist minister of a state in India.

== Early life ==
C. P. John has a B.Sc. in physics (1977) and LLB (1980) from the University of Calicut.

== Political career ==
John was the Vice President of SFI Central committee during 1978 and the youngest President of Kerala State committee of SFI. He was one of the Communist Party of India (Marxist) leadership that sided with M.V. Raghavan when the latter broke with CPI(M) in 1986 and founded the Communist Marxist Party. When M.V. Raghavan died in 2014, the party had split and with the C.P. John-led faction staying with UDF. In 2016 C.P. John was elected general secretary of the Confederation of Indian Communists and Democratic Socialists. He was the national executive member of Hind Mazdoor Sabha.

He has served two terms as a member in Kerala State Planning Board. John is a prominent leader of the United Democratic Front (UDF), and acts as spokesperson on behalf of the UDF.

=== 2026 Kerala Legislative Assembly election ===
In the 2026 Kerala Legislative Assembly election, C. P. John contested as the United Democratic Front (UDF) candidate from the Thiruvananthapuram constituency. In a closely contested triangular battle involving the Left Democratic Front (LDF) and the NDA, John secured victory with a margin of 9,863 votes. He polled a total of 45,586 votes, defeating the LDF-backed independent candidate, actor Sudheer Karamana, who received 35,723 votes.

2026 Kerala Legislative Assembly election: Thiruvananthapuram
Party	Candidate	Votes	%	±%
CMPKSC (UDF)	C. P. John	45,586	38.3	+5.81
Ind. (LDF)	Sudheer Karamana	35,723	30.0	-8.01
BJP	Karamana Jayan	35,125	29.5	+2.21
Margin of victory		9,863	8.3	
Turnout		1,19,021	64.5	
CMPKSC gain from JKC		Swing		
