= Department of Food, Civil Supplies & Consumer Affairs =

Indian governing body regulating food and civil supplies

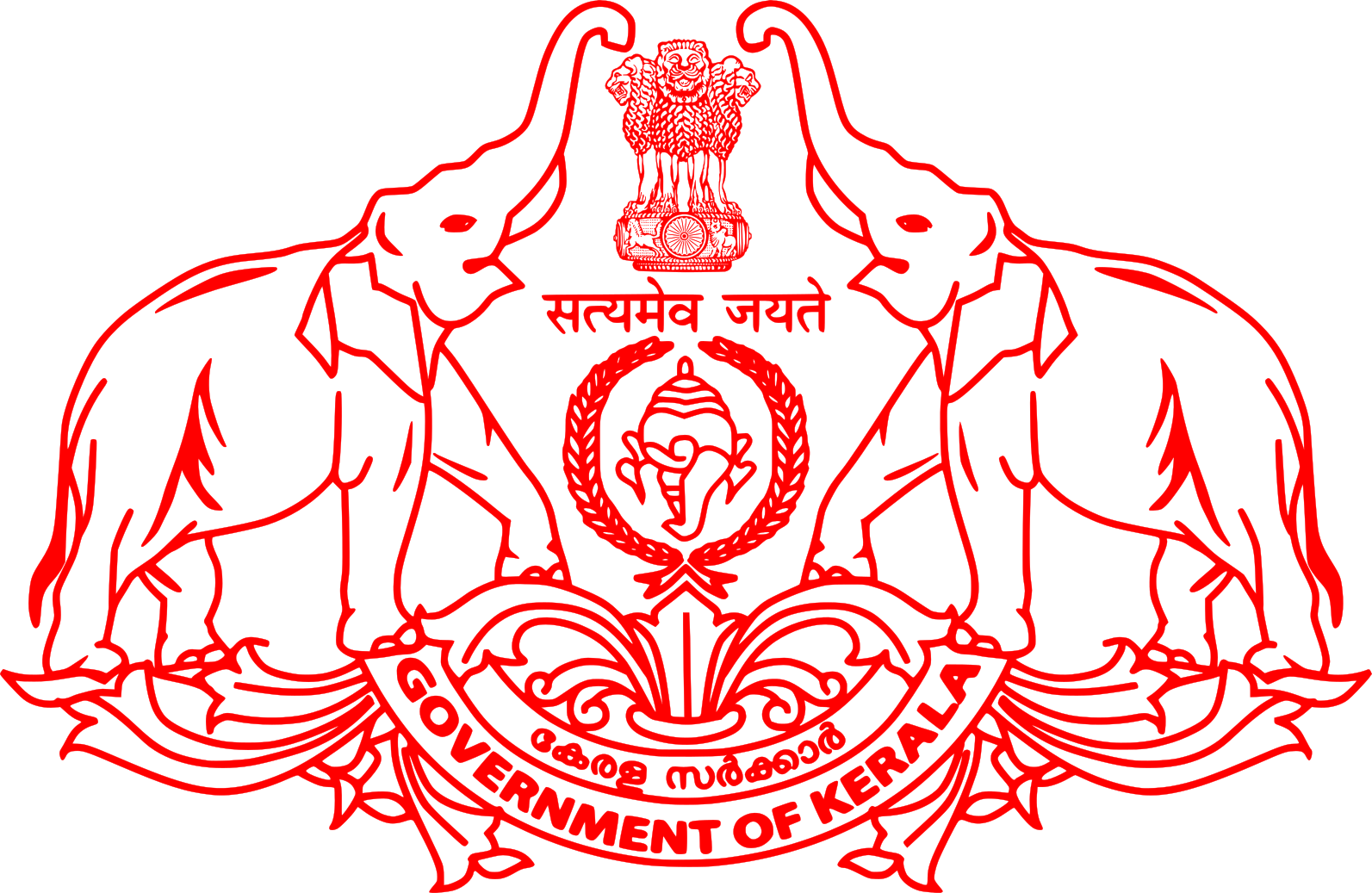

Agency overview
- Headquarters: Kerala Government Secretariat, Thiruvananthapuram
- Annual budget: ₹2,313.4867 crore (US$240 million) (2026–27, revised)
- Minister responsible: Anoop Jacob, Minister for Food, Civil Supplies, Consumer Affairs & Legal Metrology
- Agency executive: Ali Asghar Pasha IAS, Secretary, Food, Civil Supplies & Consumer Affairs Department
- Child agencies: Department of Consumer Affairs; Department of Civil Supplies; Department of Legal Metrology
- Website: https://civilsupplieskerala.gov.in/

The Food, Civil Supplies & Consumer Affairs Department is a department of the Government Secretariat, in the state of Kerala, India. The field department, that is, the operational wing of this administrative department, is the Civil Supplies & Consumer Affairs Department of Kerala.

== 1915 ==
1915 is the toll-free number of the National Consumer Helpline (NCH) in India for consumer complaints related to goods and services. It is operated by the Department of Consumer Affairs to provide guidance, grievance redressal, and information on consumer rights.

=== Services ===
- Grievance registration for defective goods, deficient services, and unfair trade practices.
- Guidance on consumer rights under the Consumer Protection Act, 2019.
- Mobile support through the National Consumer Helpline App.
