= Nava Kerala Mission =

Country-wide initiative in India

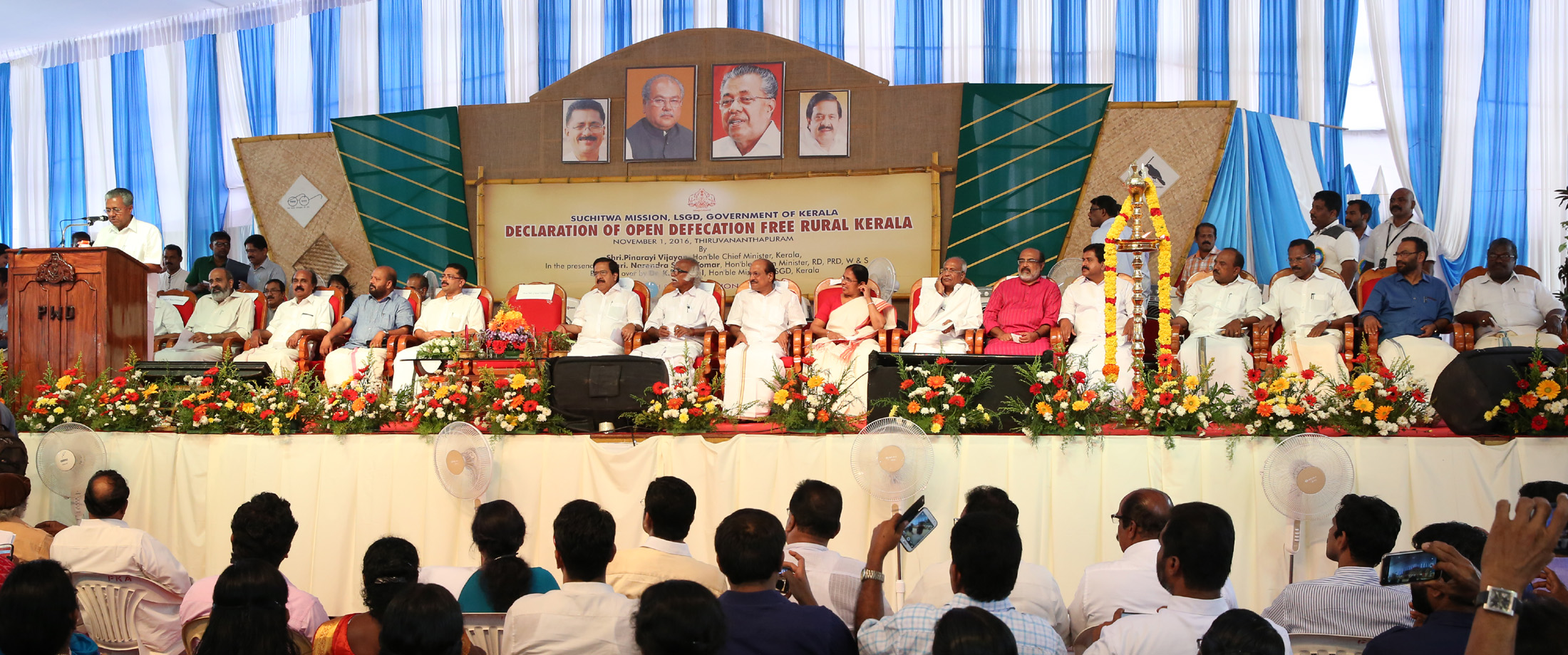
- Pinarayi Vijayan addressing the gathering at the declaration of the Open Defecation Free Kerala
- Country: India
- State: Kerala
- Chief Minister: Pinarayi Vijayan
- Launched: 10 November 2016; 9 years ago
- Status: Active
- Website: LIFE Mission; Green Kerala Mission; Health Mission; Education Mission

Nava Kerala Mission is an initiative of the Pinarayi Vijayan-led Government of Kerala launched in November 2016. The initiative seeks to address problems faced in four key social sectors, namely, health, education, agriculture and housing, with the help and involvement of local self-governments. The Mission was officially launched by P. Sathasivam, Governor of Kerala, in a meeting held in Thiruvananthapuram on 10 November 2016.

== Schemes under the Mission ==
The mission emphasizes the implementation four schemes:

=== Haritha Keralam ===
This envisages a clean state by taking up various waste management programmes. It is also planned to implement sanitation schemes, projects for preserving water sources, agriculture development and promotion of organic farming.

=== Aardram ===
This scheme is aimed at improving facilities in government-run hospitals with a view to extend treatment at a reasonable cost.

=== Life ===
Under this scheme, it is proposed to provide housing for all homeless people. The declared aim of the scheme is to build houses for an estimated 4.32 lakh (432,000) families in Kerala who don't own any land or houses. It has been estimated that an amount of Rs.6,000-6,500 crore (Rs. sixty billion – Rs. sixty-five billion) may be required to fully implement the scheme. People who stay in non liveable houses were also included in this project.

=== Comprehensive Educational Rejuvenation Programme ===
This is a scheme to preserve and strengthen the public education system of Kerala. One of the key proposals under the scheme is develop about a 1000 schools to international standards.
