= Department of Industries and Commerce (Kerala) =

Indian state government department

Agency overview
- Formed: 1960
- Jurisdiction: Government of Kerala
- Headquarters: Thiruvananthapuram
- Annual budget: ₹2,143.84 crore (US$220 million) (2026–27)
- Ministers responsible: P.K. Kunhalikutty, Minister for Industries, Commerce, Mining and Geology, Handlooms and Textiles, and Information Technology; Ramesh Chennithala, Minister for Coir industries
- Agency executives: Mr. Suman Billa IAS, Principal Industry (Industries and NORKA); Mr. A P M Mohammed Hanish IAS, Principal Secretary (Industries)
- Child agencies: Kerala State Industrial Development Corporation Limited; Directorate of Industries and Commerce; Kerala Industrial Infrastructure Development Corporation; Kerala Bureau of Industrial Promotion
- Website: http://www.keralaindustry.org/

The Department of Industries is a key government department that oversees industrial activity in the Indian state of Kerala. The DOI is a senior cabinet department led by a senior minister and team of 15 secretaries. The administrative head of the Industries & Commerce Department is the Principal Secretary (Industries & Commerce). The Directorate of Industries & Commerce Department is located at Vikas Bhavan, Thiruvananthapuram, is headed by the Director (Industries & Commerce). This is the functional arm of the department implementing various industrial activities of the departments. District Industries Centers are located in all district headquarters.

== Objectives ==
- Convert Kerala into a favoured destination for Manufacturing, Agro Processing, Health Services, and Knowledge based Industries and Services
- Strengthen the State Level Public Enterprises (SLPEs) by technological upgradation, diversification, efficient management system and synergizing with Central Public Sector Undertakings
- Make Traditional Industries competitive by modernization, value addition and skill development
- Promote and support SMSEs as an ancillary to large scale industries as well as a self-sustaining entity considering its role as a largest employment provider in the State
- Make use of the abundant and highly rich mineral resources of the State to the fullest extent protecting environment and ecology and restricting the mining activity in the Public Sector
- Generate massive employment in industrial, commercial and service sectors
- Attract huge capital investment on mutually beneficial terms
- Tap the rich industrial potential of biotechnology
- Accelerate growth in Service Sector and to make Kerala a major Commercial Hub
- Develop Kerala as a global centre of excellence with state-of-the-art education and skill sets and prepare a pool of multi skilled, technically competent individuals and organizations

== Organization structure ==
The Industries & Commerce Department is headed by the Hon'ble Minister (Industries and Commerce). The administrative head of the Industries & Commerce Department is the Principal Secretary (Industries) to Government.

The incumbent Minister for Industries and Commerce is P. K. Kunhalikutty, Minister for Coir Development is Ramesh Chennithala and Principal Secretary (Industries) to the Government is APM Mohammed Hanish IAS.

The Principal Secretary (Industries) is the administrative head of the department, and assisted by additional secretaries, joint secretaries, deputy secretaries, under secretaries and other secretariat staffs.

== Line departments ==
- Directorate of Industries and Commerce (DI&C)
- Directorate of Handloom and Textiles
- Directorate of Public Sector Undertakings
- Directorate of Coir Development Department
- Department of Mining and Geology

== Promotional Agencies ==
- Kerala State Industrial Development Corporation (KSIDC)
- Kerala Industrial Infrastructure Development Corporation (KINFRA)
- Kerala Bureau of Industrial Promotion (K-BIP)
- Public Sector Restructuring and Internal Audit Board (RIAB)
- Khadi and Village Industries Board (KVIB)
- Board for Public Sector Transformation (BPT)

== See also ==
- Invest Kerala Global Summit
