= Government of Kerala =

Indian State Government

- Seat of Government: Kerala Government Secretariat, Thiruvananthapuram
- Website: kerala.gov.in

Legislative branch
- Assembly: Kerala Legislative Assembly
- Speaker: Thiruvanchoor Radhakrishnan
- Deputy Speaker: Shanimol Osman
- Members in Assembly: 140
- Meeting place: Niyamasabha Mandiram, Thiruvananthapuram

Executive branch
- Governor (Head of the state): Om Prakash Mathur
- Chief Minister (Head of the government): V. D. Satheesan
- Chief Secretary: Bishwanath Sinha, IAS
- Headquarters: Kerala Government Secretariat, Thiruvananthapuram
- Main organ: Kerala Council of Ministers
- Departments: 50

Judicial Branch
- High Court: High Court of Kerala
- Chief Justice: Soumen Sen
- Seat: Kochi

The Government of Kerala (abbreviated as GoK) (Note: also known as the Government of Keralam, State Government of Kerala, or locally as the Kerala Government) is the administrative body responsible for governing the Indian state of Kerala. The government is led by a chief minister, who selects all the other ministers.

The Kerala Council of Ministers, also known as the State Cabinet, is the highest executive decision-making body of the Government of Kerala. The Council of Ministers is collectively responsible to the Kerala Legislative Assembly.

Ministers of the Kerala government are responsible to the Kerala Legislative Assembly; they make statements in the assembly and take questions from members of the assembly. The government is dependent on Kerala Legislative Assembly to make primary legislation. Legislative assembly elections are held every five years to elect a new assembly, unless there is a successful vote of no confidence in the government or a two-thirds vote for a snap election in the assembly, in which case an election may be held sooner. After an election, the governor selects as chief minister the leader of the party most likely to command the confidence of the assembly, usually by possessing a majority of MLAs.

Under the Indian constitution, executive authority lies with the governor, although this authority is exercised only by, or on the advice of, the chief minister and the cabinet. In most cases, the cabinet members exercise power directly as leaders of the government departments, though some cabinet positions are sinecures to a greater or lesser degree.

== Executive branch ==
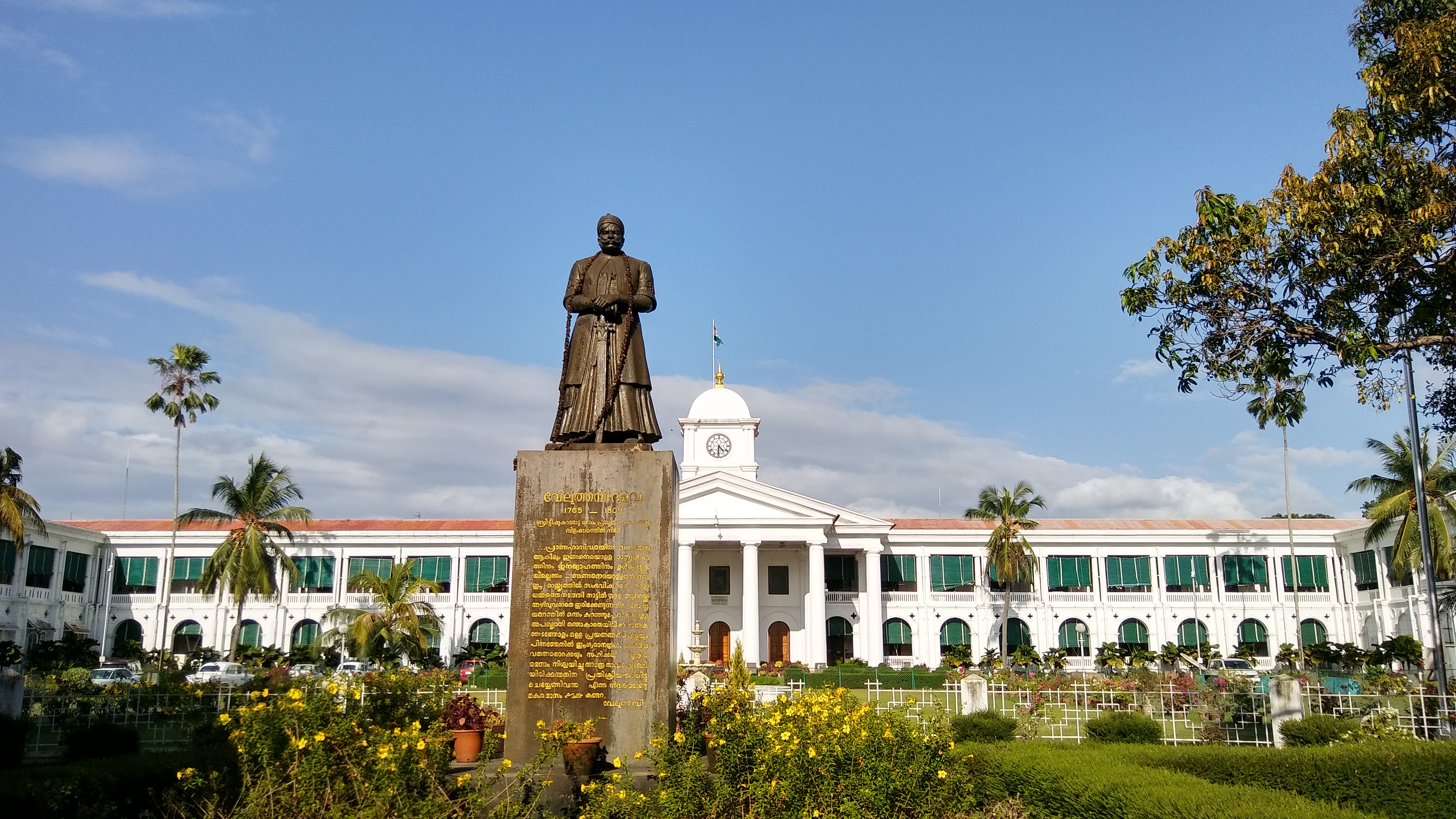
The city of Thiruvananthapuram serves as the administrative headquarters of Kerala.

=== Governor ===
The governor is appointed by the President for a term of five years. The executive and legislative powers lie with the Chief Minister and his council of ministers, who are appointed by the governor. The governors of the states and territories of India have similar powers and functions at the state level as that of the president of India at the national level. Only Indian citizens above 35 years of age are eligible for appointment. Governors discharge all constitutional functions, such as the appointment of the chief minister, sending reports to the president about failure of constitutional machinery in a state, or with respect to issues relating to the assent to a bill passed by legislature, exercise or their own opinion.

Thumbnail map of India with Kerala highlighted.

Om Prakash Mathur is the present governor.

The governor enjoys many different types of powers:

- Executive powers related to administration, appointments, and removals
- Legislative powers related to lawmaking and the state legislature
- Discretionary powers to be carried out according to the discretion of the governor

=== Kerala Council of Ministers ===
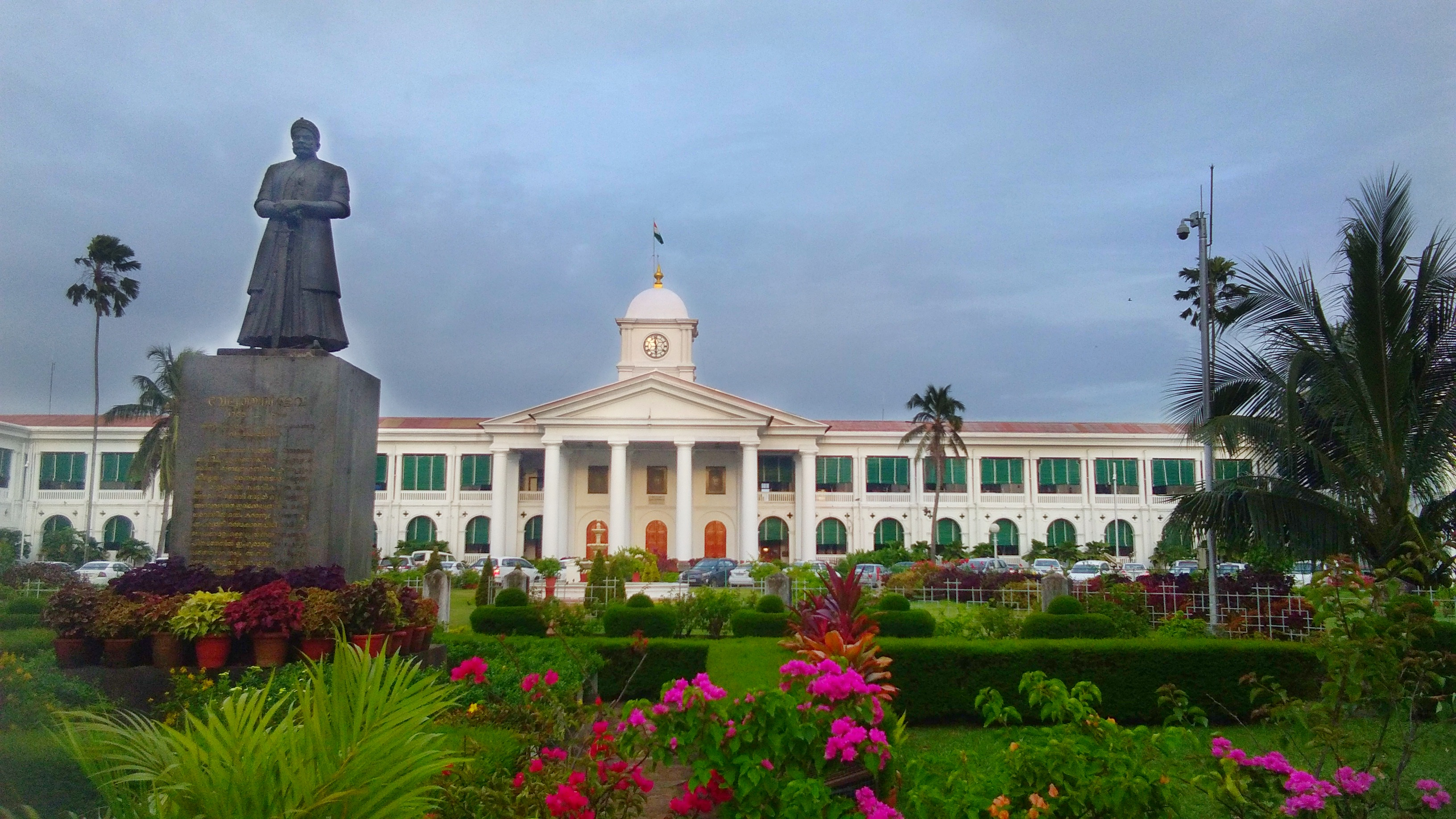
The Government Secretariat Complex in Thiruvananthapuram, which houses offices of ministers and government secretaries

Like in other Indian states, the executive arm of the state is responsible for the day-to-day management of the state. It consists of the governor, the chief minister and the council of ministers (also known as cabinet). The governor appoints the chief minister, and on the chief minister’s advice appoints the other ministers, while the chief minister allocates portfolios among them. The governor summons prorogues and dissolves the legislature. He can close the legislative assembly on the recommendation of the chief minister. Judiciary has been separated from the executive in Kerala like other Indian states.

The executive authority is headed by the Chief Minister of Kerala, who is the de facto head of state and is vested with most of the executive powers; the Legislative Assembly's majority party leader is appointed to this position by the Governor. The present Chief Minister is V.D. Satheesan, who took office on 18 May 2026. Generally, the winning party decides the chief minister. In many cases, the party focuses a chief ministerial candidate during the election.

The Council of Ministers, which answers to the Legislative Assembly, has its members appointed by the Governor; the appointments receive input from the Chief Minister. They are collectively responsible to the legislative assembly of the State. Generally, the winning party and its chief minister chooses the ministers list and submit the list for the Governor's approval.

==== The Present Council of Ministers of the Government of Kerala ====
The Chief Minister V. D. Satheesan assumed office for his first term on 18 May 2026. The oath-taking ceremony was held at the Central Stadium in Thiruvananthapuram. The Governor of Kerala Rajendra Vishwanath Arlekar administered the oath of office and secrecy to the members of the Council of Ministers.

S.No	Name	Portrait	Constituency	Designation	Portfolios	Party
Chief Minister
1.	V. D. Satheesan	Satheeshan.V.D.UDF	Paravur	Chief Minister	General Administration; Finance; Law; Ports; All India Services (IAS, IPS, IFS); Personnel and Administrative Reforms; Election; Disaster Management; Administration of Civil & Criminal Justice; Planning and Economic Affairs; State Goods and Services Tax; Treasury; State Audit; National Savings; State Insurance Department; Stamps and Stamp Duties; Kerala Financial Corporation; Kerala State Financial Enterprises; Non-Resident Keralites Affairs; Distress Relief; Airports; Metro Rail; Railways; Inter-State River Waters; Coastal Shipping and Inland Navigation; Kerala Shipping and Inland Navigation Corporation; Information and Public Relations; Printing and Stationary; Science; Technology; Scientific Institutes; Senior Citizens’ Weflare; Pollution Control; Sainik Welfare; State Hospitality; Integration; Rajiv Gandhi Centre for Biotechnology; National University of Advanced Legal Studies (NUALS); Rajiv Gandhi Academy for Aviation Technology; Posts & Telegraphs; Public Procurement Advisory Department; Khadi and Village Industries; State Lotteries; Agricultural Income Tax; All important policy decisions; Other unallocated portfolios	INC
Cabinet ministers
2.	Ramesh Chennithala		Haripad	Minister for Home, Vigilance and Coir	Home; Vigilance; Prisons; Fire and Rescue Services; Coir	INC
3.	K. Muraleedharan		Vattiyoorkavu	Minister for Health and Family Welfare, and Devaswom	Health; Family Welfare; Ayush; Devaswom; Medical Education; Medical University; Indigenous Medicine; Drugs Control; Food Safety	INC
4.	Sunny Joseph		Peravoor	Minister for Electricity, Environment and Parliamentary Affairs	Electricity; Environment; Parliamentary Affairs; ANERT	INC
5.	Shibu Baby John		Chavara	Minister for Forests and Wild Life, and Skill Development	Forests & Wildlife Protection; Skill Development; Kerala Academy for Skills Excellence (KASE); Employment and Training; Cashew Industry	RSP
6.	Mons Joseph		Kaduthuruthy	Minister for Water Resources and Housing	Irrigation; Command Area Development Authority (CADA); Ground Water Development; Water Supply & Sanitation; Housing	KEC
7.	Anoop Jacob		Piravom	Minister for Food, Civil Supplies, and Consumer Affairs	Food, Civil Supplies; Consumer Affairs; Legal Metrology	KC(J)
8.	P. K. Kunhalikutty		Malappuram	Minister for Industries and Information Technology	Industries and Commerce; Information Technology; Artificial Intelligence; Start Ups; Mining and Geology; Handlooms & Textiles; Plantation Directorate; Industrial Co-operatives; Kerala University of Digital Sciences	IUML
9.	C. P. John		Thiruvananthapuram	Minister for Transport	Road Transport; Motor Vehicles; Water Transport	CMP
10.	A. P. Anil Kumar	A.P._Anil_Kumar	Wandoor	Minister for Revenue	Land Revenue; Survey and Land Records; Land Reforms	INC
11.	N. Samsudheen		Mannarkkad	Minister for General Education and Minority Welfare	General Education; Minority Welfare; Literacy Movement; Waqf Hajj Pilgrimage	IUML
12.	Roji M. John		Angamaly	Minister for Higher Education	Collegiate Education; Technical Education; Universities (Except Agriculture, Veterinary, Fisheries, Medical and Digital Universities); Entrance Examination; National Cadet Corps; Additional Skill Acquisition Programme (ASAP) Kerala	INC
13.	P. C. Vishnunadh		Kundara	Minister for Tourism and Culture	Tourism; Culture; Kerala State Film Development Corporation; Kerala State Chalachithra Academy; Kerala Cultural Activists Welfare Fund Board	INC
14.	Bindhu Krishna		Kollam	Minister for Labour, Dairy Development, Women and Child Development, and Animal Husbandry	Labour; Dairy Development & Milk Co-Operatives; Women & Child Development; Animal Husbandry; Kerala Veterinary & Animal Sciences University; Rehabilitation; Factories and Boilers; Insurance Medical Service; Industrial Tribunals; Labour Courts	INC
15.	M. Liju		Kayamkulam	Minister for Excise and Co-operation	Excise; Co-operation	INC
16.	K. M. Shaji		Vengara	Minister for Local Self Governments	Local Self Government–Panchayat, Municipality and Corporation; Town Planning; Rural Development; Regional Development Authorities; Kerala Institute of Local Administration (KILA)	IUML
17.	P. K. Basheer		Eranad	Minister for Public Works	Public Works Department (PWD)	IUML
18.	V. E. Abdul Gafoor		Kalamassery	Minister for Fisheries and Social Justice	Fisheries; Harbour Engineering; Social Justice; Kerala University of Fisheries and Ocean Studies	IUML
19.	T. Siddique		Kalpetta	Minister for Agriculture	Agriculture; Soil Survey & Soil Conservation; Kerala Agricultural University; Warehousing Corporation	INC
20.	K. A. Thulasi		Kongad	Minister for Welfare of Scheduled Castes, Scheduled Tribes, and Backward Classes	Scheduled Castes Development; Scheduled Tribes Development; Backward Classes Development	INC
21.	O. J. Janeesh		Kodungallur	Minister for Sports, Youth Affairs, Registration and Archaeology	Youth Affairs; Sports; Zoos; Museum; Registration; Archaeology; Archives	INC

== Legislative branch ==
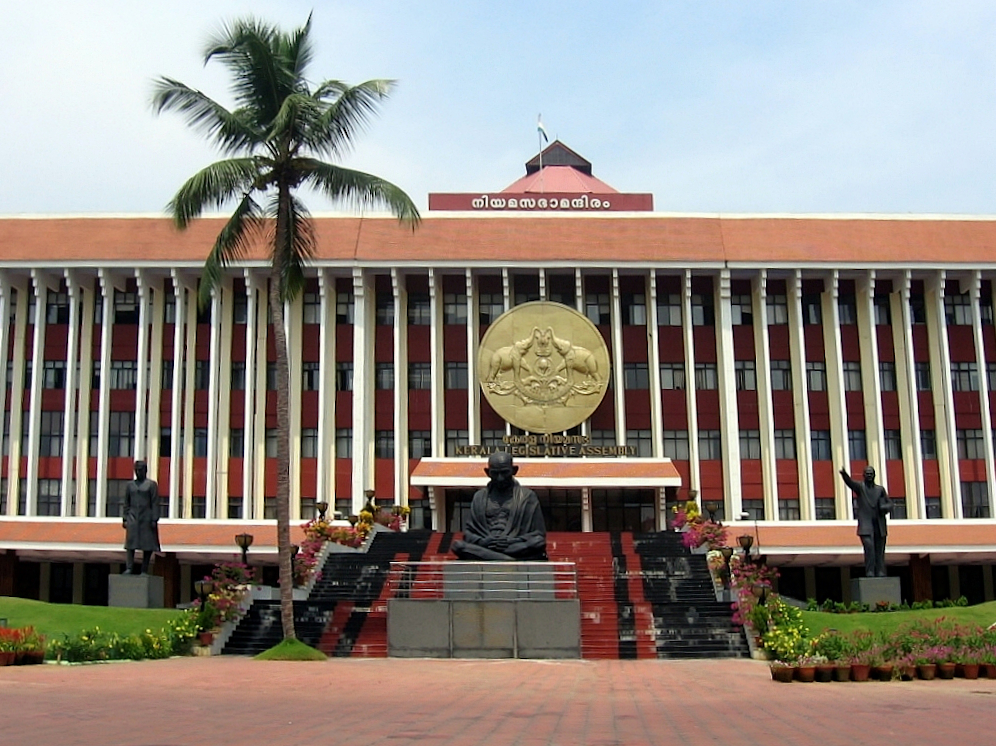
The state assembly building in Thiruvananthapuram.

The legislature comprises the governor and the legislative assembly, which is the highest political organ in the state. The governor has the power to summon the assembly or to close the same. All members of the legislative assembly are directly elected, normally once in every five years by the eligible voters who are above 18 years of age. The current assembly consists of 140 elected members and one member nominated by the governor from the Anglo-Indian community. The elected members select one of its own members as its chairman who is called the speaker. The speaker is assisted by the deputy speaker who is also elected by the members. The conduct of a meeting in the house is the responsibility of the speaker.

The main function of the assembly is to pass laws and rules. Every bill passed by the house has to be finally approved by the governor before it becomes applicable.

The normal term of the legislative assembly is five years from the date appointed for its first meeting. But while a proclamation of state of emergency is in operation, the said period will be extended by Parliament by Laws for a period not exceeding one year at a time.

== Judicial branch ==
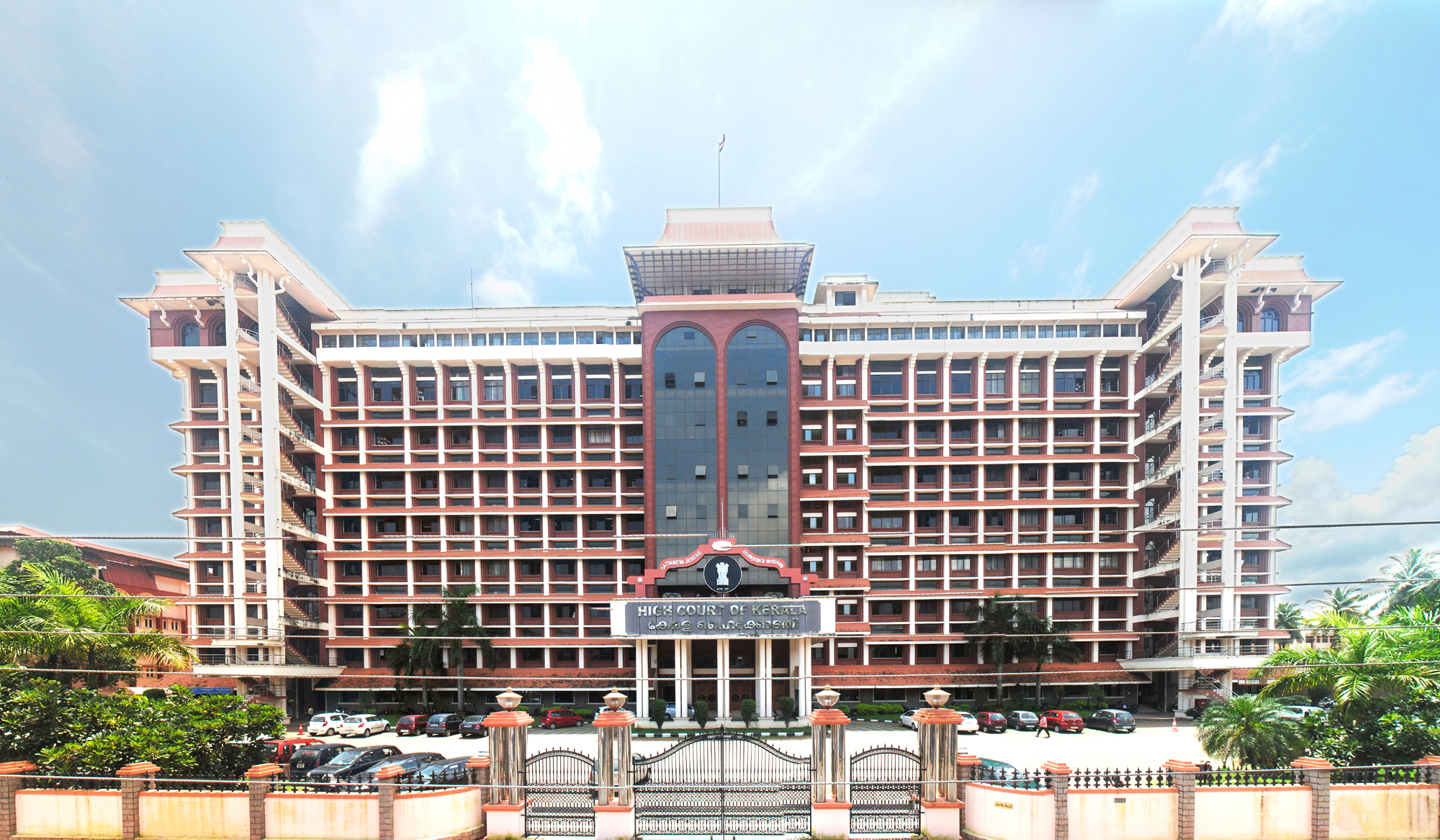
The Kerala High Court located in Eranakulam.

The judiciary of Kerala functions as an independent branch of the state government, in accordance with the Constitution of India. The apex court in the state is the High Court of Kerala, which has jurisdiction over the state of Kerala and the Union Territory of Lakshadweep. It is located at Kochi.

The High Court is headed by the Chief Justice of Kerala, and comprises 35 permanent judges and 12 additional judges appointed by the President of India in consultation with the Chief Justice of India and the Governor of Kerala. Below the High Court, the judicial system includes district and subordinate courts, various special courts and tribunals for specific cases.

Kerala has 14 district and sessions courts, each headed by a Principal District and Sessions Judge. All these judicial districts are located in district headquarters, except at Manjeri, Thodupuzha, and Thalassery. These District Courts are vested with original, appellate, and revisional jurisdiction in both civil and criminal matters.

Special courts and tribunals exist, including special courts for the trial of cases registered by the NIA, CBI, and Kerala Vigilance, as well as tribunals for specific matters, all functioning under the appellate jurisdiction of the High Court of Kerala.

Besides these, Kerala has 78 Additional District Courts (including 50 Additional Motor Accident Claims Tribunals). The state also has 40 Sub Courts and 16 Additional Sub Courts. At the lower level, there are 57 Munsiff’s Courts, 24 Additional Munsiff’s Courts, and 20 Judicial Magistrate’s Courts, making a total of 77 Munsiff and Magistrate Courts. In addition, Kerala has 28 Family Courts, 27 Motor Accident Claims Tribunals, one Waqf Tribunal, 22 Fast Track Courts, and 30 Gram Nyayalayas.

== Head Leaders ==
Constitutional office holders
Post	Incumbent	Portrait	Assumed office
Governor of Kerala	Om Prakash Mathur		23 October 2026 (27 days)
Chief Minister of Kerala	V. D. Satheesan		18 May 2026 (6 months and 1 day)
Speaker of the Legislative Assembly	Thiruvanchoor Radhakrishnan		19 May 2026
Deputy Speaker of the Legislative Assembly	Shanimol Usman		19 May 2026
Leader of the Opposition	Pinarayi Vijayan		TBD
Chief Justice of Kerala	Soumen Sen		10 January 2026
Advocate General of Kerala	Jaju Babu		18 May 2026

District in-charge ministers of Kerala
No.	District	Minister
1	Thiruvananthapuram	C. P. John
2	Kollam	Shibu Baby John
3	Pathanamthitta	P. C. Vishnunadh
4	Alappuzha	M. Liju
5	Kottayam	Mons Joseph
6	Idukki	Anoop Jacob
7	Ernakulam	Roji M. John
8	Thrissur	O. J. Janeesh
9	Palakkad	N. Shamsudheen
10	Malappuram	P. K. Basheer
11	Kozhikode	A. P. Anil Kumar
12	Wayanad	T. Siddique
13	Kannur	Sunny Joseph
14	Kasaragod	K. M. Shaji

Statutory and Quasi-Judicial Authorities
Office	Incumbent	Photo	Assumed office
Chairperson, Kerala State Human Rights Commission ^	Justice Alexander Thomas (Retd.)		2021
Lok Ayukta, Kerala Lok Ayukta ^	Justice N. Anil Kumar		2023
State Election Commissioner, Kerala State Election Commission	N. Seshadrinathan		January 2022
Chairman, Kerala Public Service Commission	M. R. Baiju		2023
Chairperson, Kerala State Commission for Women	P. Sathidevi		October 2021
Chairperson, Kerala State Commission for SC/ST	Justice G. Sasidharan		2023

Key Administrative Officials
Office	Incumbent	Photo	Assumed office
Chief Secretary, Government of Kerala	Biswanath Sinha, IAS		May 2025
Director General of Police & State Police Chief, Kerala	Ravada A. Chandrasekhar, IPS		June 2025
Director General of Prosecution (Directorate of Prosecution)	T. Asaf Ali (State Public Prosecutor)		May 2028

== Departments ==
The business of the state government is transacted through the various secretariat departments based on the rules of business. Each department is headed by a minister, who functions as the political head, while the secretary serves as the administrative head of the department. Each department consists of secretary to the government, who is the official head of the department and such other special secretaries, additional secretaries, joint secretaries, deputy secretaries, under secretaries, section officers, and staffs subordinate to him/her. Each section, the basic administrative unit of the secretariat, is headed by a section officer and staffed by assistant section officers and assistants. The Chief secretary superintending control over the whole secretariat and staff attached to the ministers. Secretaries in charge of departments are generally officers of the Indian Administrative Service (IAS), holding the rank of Additional Chief Secretary (ACS) or Principal Secretary, or Secretary.

The department is further divided into sections, each of which is under the charge of a section officer. Apart from these sections, dealing with the subjects allotted to them, there are other offices sections, assigned with specific duties. When there is more than one secretary in a department, there shall be a clear separation of work.

In addition to the Secretariat, the Government operates various line departments—commonly known as Directorates or Commissionerates—which function under the administrative control of their respective Secretariat Departments. These departments are responsible for policy implementation and service delivery and are headed by designated officers such as Directors, Commissioners, or Directors General, who may belong to IAS, IPS, IFS, or technical/specialist cadres.

Besides government departments, the state performs its functions through several allied institutions, including autonomous bodies, welfare fund boards, development authorities, commissions, public sector undertakings, universities, and cultural institutions.

At present there are 50 Secretariat Departments as below:

No.	Department
1	Agricultural Development and Farmers Welfare Department
2	Animal Husbandry Department
3	Ayush Department
4	Backward Communities Development Department
5	Co-operation Department
6	Coastal Shipping & Inland Navigation Department
7	Consumer Affairs Department
8	Cultural Affairs Department
9	Dairy Development Department
10	Disaster Management Department
11	Elderly Welfare Department
12	Election Department
13	Electronics & Information Technology Department
14	Environment Department
15	Finance Department
16	Fisheries and Ports Department
17	Food and Civil Supplies Department
18	Forests and Wildlife Department
19	General Administration Department
20	General Education Department
21	Health & Family Welfare Department
22	Higher Education Department
23	Home Department
24	Housing Department
25	Industries and Commerce Department
26	Information and Public Relations Department
27	Labour and Skills Department
28	Law Department
29	Local Self Government Department
30	Minority Welfare Department
31	Non Resident Keralites Affairs (NORKA) Department
32	Parliamentary Affairs Department
33	Personnel & Administrative Reforms Department
34	Planning and Economic Affairs Department
35	Programme Implementation, Evaluation and Monitoring Department
36	Power Department
37	Public Procurement Advisory Department
38	Public Works Department
39	Revenue Department
40	Sainik Welfare Department
41	Scheduled Caste and Scheduled Tribes Development Department
42	Science & Technology Department
43	Social Justice Department
44	Sports & Youth Affairs Department
45	Taxes Department
46	Tourism Department
47	Transport Department
48	Vigilance Department
49	Water Resources Department
50	Women & Child Development Department

== Administrative divisions ==
State administrative structure		Ref.
Administrative divisions	Total	
Districts	14	
Revenue Divisions	27	
Taluks	78	
Revenue Villages	1666	

Local-Self Governments	Total	Ref.
District Panchayats	14	
Block Panchayats	152	
Grama Panchayats	941	
Municipal Corporations	6	
Municipalities	87	

Electoral constituencies	Total
Lok Sabha constituencies	20
Legislative assembly constituencies	140

For administrative convenience, Kerala State has been divided into 14 districts, 27 revenue divisions, 77 taluks, 152 CD blocks, and 1666 revenue villages. For local governance, the state has 941 gram panchayats, 152 block panchayats, 14 district panchayats, 6 corporations, and 87 municipalities.

== State insignias ==
Symbols of Kerala
- Emblem of Kerala
- Language: Malayalam
- Bird: Great Indian hornbill
- Fish: Pearlspot (karimeen)
- Flower: Cassia fistula (Indian laburnum)
- Fruit: Jackfruit
- Mammal: Elephant
- Tree: Coconut
- Costume: Mundum neriyathum (women); Mundu (men)

The Kerala State Emblem is a derivative version of the royal coat of arms of the Kingdom of Travancore. The state emblem symbolises two elephants guarding the Imperial Shanku, or conch, in its imperial crest. This crest was the insignia of Lord Sree Padmanabha (a form of Lord Vishnu) - the national deity of Travancore. Shanku was considered one of the common emblems of a majority of the Kerala feudal kingdoms. The Kingdom of Cochin and Zamorin's Malabar also had conch as state emblems. When the kingdoms of Cochin and Travancore merged in 1949, for a brief period, the crest carried a wheel or chakra in the centre with Shanku on top of it. With the accession of Malabar into Travancore-Cochin, the state of Kerala was formed in 1957. During this time, the royal coat of arms of the Travancore kingdom was modified by placing the "Lion Capital of Ashoka" on top of the imperial conch. The Travancore Royal Family uses the erstwhile Royal Coat of Arms of Travancore today, whereas Sree Padmanabhaswamy Temple of Trivandrum uses only the imperial conch crest as its coat of arms.

The state animal of Kerala is the elephant, and the government emblem has two elephants in it. The state bird is the great Indian hornbill (ML:മലമ്പുഴക്കി വേഴാമ്പല്‍). The state flower is the golden shower (ML:കണിക്കൊന്ന), and the state tree is the coconut. The state fish is the pearlspot or karimeen (കരിമീന്‍‌).

== Finance and Expenditure ==
The Government of Kerala finances its activities through its own tax and non-tax revenues, along with transfers from the Government of India. In 2024–25, the state received total revenue of ₹1,24,861.06 crore. This included ₹93,128.81 crore from the state's own revenues—₹76,642.19 crore from taxes and ₹16,486.62 crore from non-tax sources—and ₹31,732.25 crore from the Government of India, comprising the state's share of central taxes and central grants.

Major sources of tax revenue include the State Goods and Services Tax (SGST), State Excise, Motor Vehicles Tax, Sales and Commercial Taxes, Stamp Duty and Registration Fees, and Land Revenue. Major non-tax revenue sources include lotteries, dividends and profits, interest receipts, fees, and other receipts.

Major expenditure is incurred on salaries, pensions, interest payments, education, healthcare, social development, grants to local self-government institutions, and welfare programmes. In 2025–26, Social Development accounted for the largest share of government expenditure at ₹87,966 crore, followed by Salary (₹57,565 crore), Pension (₹38,670 crore), Interest Payments (₹34,376 crore), Education (₹33,330 crore), Local Body Grants (₹14,761 crore), and Medical and Public Health (₹13,261 crore). In comparison, the largest expenditure heads in 2024–25 were Salary (₹39,903 crore), Interest Payments (₹29,138 crore), Pension (₹27,885 crore), Education (₹23,111 crore), Grants-in-Aid (₹11,665 crore), and Medical and Public Health (₹10,431 crore).

=== State budget ===
The State Budget of Kerala, officially known as the Annual Financial Statement under the Constitution of India, is the government's annual financial plan outlining its estimated revenue and expenditure for a financial year.

It is presented in the Kerala Legislative Assembly by the Kerala Finance Minister and requires legislative approval before implementation. It is usually presented in February. The budget allocates funds to various government departments and sectors, while also detailing the state's expected sources of revenue, such as taxes, non-tax income, grants, and borrowings.

== Elections ==
Elections to the state assembly and local bodies are held every five years. Elections are generally held for Parliament, State assembly and regional municipalities and rural panchayats. Due to the large numbers of eligible voters, over 21 million, elections are usually held on several dates. Like all other Indian states, the minimum age of registration of a voter is 18 years.

== Politics ==
Kerala has a unique position in India as one of the most politicised states. It has the nation's largest politically aware population, which actively participates in state politics.

Politics in Kerala has been dominated by two political fronts, the Communist Party of India (Marxist)-led Left Democratic Front (LDF) and the Indian National Congress-led United Democratic Front (UDF), since the late 1970s. These two coalitions have alternated in power since 1982, although this pattern was broken in 2021. According to the 2021 Kerala Legislative Assembly election, the LDF has a majority in the state assembly (99/140).

The political alliance has strongly stabilised and, with rare exceptions, most of the coalition partners maintain loyalty to the alliance. As a result of this, power has alternated between these two fronts since 1979.

In terms of individual parties, the state has strong leanings towards socialism and thus Communist parties have made strong inroads in Kerala. The Malabar region, particularly Kannur and Palakkad, are considered the heartland of the Communist parties. The Kollam and Alapuzha districts, where trade unions have a strong presence, are generally inclined to Left parties, though several times the UDF has won. The CPI(M) led LDF did a clean sweep of 11–0 over UDF and NDA in Kollam district during 2016 Local body election. The largest Communist party is the CPIM and the second largest is the CPI.

The Indian National Congress, which leads the UDF coalition, has had a very strong presence in Kerala since pre-Independence days. The Congress party has great popularity in the Thrissur, Ernakulam, Kottayam, Pathanamthitta and Thiruvananthapuram regions, whereas it has a strong influence in some parts of Idukki regions.

The Bharatiya Janata Party (the Party that currently leads the Government of India) is also active in Kerala, but is not part of either coalition. It has only one elected Parliament member from Thrissur, and has lost its one Legislative Assembly member in the 2021 Kerala Legislative Assembly election and selected members in all the Corporations, several Municipal Councils and a large number of Local Panchayats. The party enjoys popularity in the districts of Thiruvananthapuram and Kasaragod.

Other popular regional parties are:

- The Kerala Congress, which has more than four denominations after breaking away from the original party. It has strong influence among settlement populations in hilly regions. The various Kerala Congress denominations are primarily patronised by the Syrian Christian community and Nair populations, mostly in Central Travancore areas like Kottayam, Idukki and Pathanamthitta. Today, most of Kerala Congress parties are with the UDF.
- The Indian Union Muslim League is a powerful pro-Muslim community-oriented party, which was started as the Muslim League prior to Independence, yet decided to transfer their allegiance to the Indian Union after Independence, when the original Muslim League went to Pakistan. The IUML-Kerala unit is the only Muslim League group to declare its allegiance and loyalty to India and hence become a state party in post-Independence India. The party has strongholds mostly in Muslim-dominated districts like Kozhikode, Malappuram and Kasargod. They form the second largest party within the UDF.
- Socialist groups, consisting of several small fragmented parties like the NCP (SP), SJD-S, JDS, and Congress-S, are mainly centre-left socialist parties having very limited influence in a few pocket areas. Most of the socialist groups are with the LDF, though in a few instances, some of them changed their loyalties to the UDF.
- Communist parties consist of various groups which have broken away from the CPIM. They are mostly centre-left parties, though a few are extreme-left. While a few centre-left parties like the RSP have joined with the UDF, those that broke away from the CPIM, like the CMP and JSS, led by erstwhile CPIM veterans who were expelled from CPIM, have joined with the UDF.
- The Bharath Dharma Jana Sena or BDJS is a new political party formed in 2015 led by Thushar Vellapally. The party's primary vote base is among Ezhava and Thiyya community. It is politically and ideologically aligned towards the BJP and is a part of National Democratic Alliance.

== Awards and honours ==
Kerala was declared as the first complete digitally administered state of India on 27 February 2016. The India Corruption Survey 2019 by Transparency International declared Kerala the least-corrupt state in India. The state topped in the country to achieve the Sustainable Development Goals according to the annual report of NITI Aayog published in 2019. The Public Affairs Index-2020 released by the Public Affairs Centre, India, designated Kerala as the best governed Indian state.
