= List of medical colleges in Kerala =

Location of government medical colleges: 13 functioning (green). 1 planned (blue)

In the state of Kerala currently there are 1650 govt medical college seats. These colleges impart training in Modern medicine. The health education system in Kerala also has Medical colleges that impart training in fields of Ayurveda, Homeopathy, Unani medicine, Siddha and Veterinary medicine. These medical institutions are all affiliated to Kerala University of Health Sciences from 2010. .

The following is a list of government, private, and self-financing medical institutions in Kerala.

== Governance and administration ==
The Minister for Health, Family Welfare and Ayush, is responsible for overall development of health sector in Kerala.

Modern medicine medical institutions in Kerala are governed by the Health and Family Welfare Department of the Government of Kerala through the Directorate of Medical Education. The office of the Director of Medical Education (Directorate of Medical Education) is located in Thiruvananthapuram.

Institutions of Indian systems of medicine (Ayurveda, Siddha, Unani and Yoga, Naturopathy and Homoeopathy) are administered by the AYUSH Department of the Government of Kerala.

== Medical colleges (Modern Medicine) ==
=== Government medical colleges ===
College		District	Estd. year	Remarks
GMCH Thiruvananthapuram	Government Medical College, Thiruvananthapuram	Thiruvananthapuram	1951; 75 years ago	First Medical College in Kerala
GMCH Kozhikode	Government Medical College, Kozhikode	Kozhikode	1957; 69 years ago	
GMCH Kottayam	Government Medical College, Kottayam	Kottayam	1962; 64 years ago	
GTDMCH Alappuzha	Government T D Medical College, Alappuzha	Alappuzha	1963; 63 years ago	First private Medical College in Kerala, later taken over by the Government of Kerala in 1972.
SCTIMST	Sree Chitra Tirunal Institute for Medical Sciences and Technology, Thiruvananthapuram	Thiruvananthapuram	1980; 46 years ago	Masters and Post-Doctoral courses only
GMCH Thrissur	Government Medical College, Thrissur	Thrissur	1981; 45 years ago	
GMCH Kannur	Government Medical College, Kannur	Kannur	1995; 31 years ago	Also known as Paraiyaram Medical College. In April 2018, the Government of Kerala took over Paraiyaram Medical College.
GMCH Ernakulam	Government Medical College, Ernakulam	Ernakulam	1999; 27 years ago	Previously known as Indira Gandhi Cochin Co-operative Medical College
GMCH Kollam	Government Medical College, Kollam	Kollam	2013; 13 years ago	Established as ESI Medical College in 2013; became Kerala Government Medical College in 2016
GMCH Manjeri	Government Medical College, Manjeri, Malappuram	Malappuram	2013; 13 years ago	MCI approval received on 2019
GMCH Palakkad	Government Medical College, Palakkad	Palakkad	2014; 12 years ago	NMC approval in 2019
GMCH Idukki	Government Medical College, Idukki	Idukki	2014; 12 years ago	Granted approval by NMC in 2022 for 100 MBBS seats
GMCH Konni	Government Medical College, Konni, Pathanamthitta	Pathanamthitta	2016; 10 years ago	July 24, 2020 started
GMCH Kasaragod	Government Medical College, Kasaragod	Kasaragod	2020	Under construction
GMCH Wayanad	Government Medical College, Madakkimala, Wayanad	Wayanad	2021	Planned
ESICMCH Kollam	ESIC Medical College, Asramam, Kollam	Kollam	2026	ESIC Approved Kollam medical college in January 2026.; Government of Kerala has officially issues essentiality certificate which grants admission of 50 MBBS seats for 2026-27

=== Private sector ===
College		District	Estd. year
AIMSRC	Amrita Institute of Medical Sciences and Research Centre, Ponnekara, Kochi	Ernakulam	2002
MOSCMMH	Malankara Orthodox Syrian Church Medical College, Kolenchery	Ernakulam	2002
PIMS	Pushpagiri Institute of Medical sciences, Thiruvalla	Pathanamthitta	2002
SMCSIMCH	Dr. Somervell Memorial CSI Medical College, Karakonam, Thiruvananthapuram	Thiruvananthapuram	2002
AIMS	Amala Institute of Medical Sciences, Amala Nagar, Thrissur	Thrissur	2003
JMMC	Jubilee Mission Medical College and Research Institute, Nellikunnu, Thrissur	Thrissur	2003
MESMCH	MES Medical College, Perinthalmanna	Malappuram	2004
SGMC	Sree Gokulam Medical College, Venjaramoodu	Thiruvananthapuram	2004
KMCH	Karuna Institute of Medical Sciences, Vilayodi, Chittur	Palakkad	2006
KMC	Kannur Medical College, Anjarakkandy	Kannur	2006
SUTAMS	SUT Academy of Medical Sciences, Vattappara	Thiruvananthapuram	2006
AIMSR	Azeezia Institute of Medical Sciences & Research, Meeyyannoor, Kollam	Kollam	2008
KMCTMCH	KMCT Medical College, Mukkam	Kozhikode	2008
TMCH	Travancore Medical College, Mylapore	Kollam	2009
SNIMS	Sree Narayana Institute of Medical Sciences, North Kuthiathode, Kunnukara	Ernakulam	2009
MMCHRC	Malabar Medical College, Ulliyeri, Kozhikode	Kozhikode	2010
DMWIMS	Dr. Moopen’s Medical College, Meppadi	Wayanad	2013
AAMC	Al-Azhar Medical College and Super Speciality Hospital, Thodupuzha	Idukki	2014
PKDIMS	P K Das Institute of Medical Sciences, Vaniyamkulam, Ottapalam	Palakkad	2014
BCMCH	Believers Church Medical College, Kuttapuzha, Thiruvalla	Pathanamthitta	2016
MZMCH	Mount Zion Medical College, Ezhamkulam, Adoor	Pathanamthitta	2017
KMCP	Kerala Medical College, Mangode, Palakkad	Palakkad	2025

== Dental colleges ==
=== Government sector ===
- Government Dental College, Thiruvananthapuram
- Government Dental College, Kottayam
- Government Dental College, Alappuzha
- Government Dental College, Kozhikode
- Government Dental College, Thrissur
- Pariyaram Dental College, Academy of Medical Sciences, Kannur

=== Private Sector ===
- Al-Azhar Dental College, Thodupuzha, Kerala
- Amrita School of Dentistry, Edappally, Ernakulam
- Annoor Dental College & Hospital, Perumattom, Muvattupuzha, Ernakulam
- Azeezia College of Dental Sciences & Research, Meeyannoor, Kollam
- Century International Institute of Dental Science & Research Center, Chengala, Kasaragod
- Educare Institute of Dental Sciences, Chattiparamba, Malappuram
- Indira Gandhi Institute of Dental Sciences, Kothamangalam
- Kannur Dental College, Anjarakkandy, Kannur
- KMCT Dental College, Mukkam, Kozhikkode
- Malabar Dental College & Research Centre, Malappuram
- Mar Baselios Dental College, Kothamangalam
- MES Dental College, Malaparamba, Perinthalmanna, Malappuram
- Noorul Islam College of Dental Sciences, Aralummoodu, Neyyattinkara, Thiruvananthpuram
- PMS College of Dental Science & Research, Venkode, Vattappara, Thiruvananthpuram
- PSM College of Dental Sciences & Research, Akkikavu, Thrissur
- Pushpagiri College of Dental Sciences, Thiruvalla
- Royal Dental College, Chalissery, Palakkad
- Sree Anjaneya Institute of Dental Sciences, Atholi, Kozhikode
- Sri Sankara Dental College, Akathumuri, Varkala, Thiruvananthapuram
- St. Gregorios Dental College, Chelad, Ernakulam
- Travancore Dental College, Thazhuthala, Kollam

== Ayurveda Medical colleges ==
=== Government sector ===
- Government Ayurveda Medical College Kannur, Pariyaram, Kannur
- Government Ayurveda Medical College, Thiruvananthapuram
- Government Ayurveda Medical College, Puthiyakavu, Tripunithura, Ernakulam

=== Aided Colleges ===
- Vaidyaratnam Ayurveda College, Ollur, Thaikkattussery, Thrissur
- Vaidyaratnam P.S. Varier Ayurveda College, Kottakkal, Malappuram

=== Self-Financing Colleges ===
- Ahalia Ayurveda Medical College, Kozhipara, Palakkad
- Ashtamgam Ayurveda Chikitsalayam and Vidyapeetam, Vavvanoor, Kootanad, Palakkad
- KMCT Ayurveda Medical College, Mukkam, Kozhikkode
- Mannam Ayurveda Co-operative Medical College, Pandalam, Pathanamthitta
- Nangelil Ayurveda Medical College, Nellikuzhi, Kothamangalam, Ernakulam
- Pankajakasthuri Ayurveda Medical College, Killy, Kattakada, Thiruvananthapuram
- MVR Ayurveda Medical College, Pappinissery, Kannur
- P.N. Panicker Souhruda Ayurveda Medical College, Kanhangad, Kasargod
- PNNM Ayurveda College, Cheruthuruthy, Shoranur, Palakkad
- Santhigiri Ayurveda Medical College, Olassery, Palakkad
- Sree Narayana Institiute of Ayurveda Studies and Research, Puthoor, Kollam
- Vishnu Ayurveda Medical College, Kulappully, Shoranur, Palakkad

== Homoeo Medical Colleges ==
- Government Homoeopathic Medical College, Iranimuttom, Thiruvananthapuram
- Government Homoeopathic Medical College, Karaparamba, Kozhikode
- National Homoeopathy Research Institute in Mental Health, Sachivothamapuram, Kottayam (Masters only)
- Athurasramam N.S.S. Homoeo Medical College, Kurichy, Kottayam
- Dr. Padiar Memorial Homoeopathic Medical College, Chottanikkara, Ernakulam
- Shree Vidhyadhiraja Homoeopathic Medical College, Nemom, Thiruvananthapuram

== Siddha Medical colleges ==
- Santhigiri Siddha Medical College, Santhigiri, Pothencode, Thiruvananthapuram

== Unani Medical colleges ==
- Markaz Unani Medical College & Hospital, Puthuppadi, Kozhikode

== See also ==
- KEAM
- List of engineering colleges in Kerala
- List of institutions of higher education in Kerala
- List of government hospitals in Kerala
