= List of government hospitals in Kerala =

The list includes government hospitals and other public healthcare institutions owned and managed by the Government of Kerala under the Health and Family Welfare Department and the AYUSH Department.

Kerala has a three-tier public health system consisting of primary, secondary and tertiary institutions. This list includes District Hospitals, General Hospitals, Taluk Hospitals, Speciality Hospitals and Medical College Hospitals, along with institutions of Ayurveda, Homoeopathy, Siddha and Unani.

The list does not include Community Health Centres (CHCs), Family Health Centres (FHCs), and Primary Health Centres (PHCs). At present, Kerala has 226 CHCs, 885 FHCs, and 849 PHCs.

== Modern medicine ==
=== Medical College Hospitals ===
Sl. No.	Name of the Institution	District	Year of Establishment
1	Government Medical College Hospital, Thiruvananthapuram	Thiruvananthapuram	1951
2	Government Medical College Hospital, Kozhikode	Kozhikode	1957
3	Government Medical College Hospital, Kottayam	Kottayam	1962
4	Government T D Medical College, Alappuzha	Alappuzha	1963
5	Sree Chitra Tirunal Institute for Medical Sciences and Technology, Thiruvananthapuram	Thiruvananthapuram	1980
6	Government Medical College Hospital, Thrissur	Thrissur	1981
7	Government Medical College, Kannur	Kannur	1995
8	Government Medical College, Ernakulam	Ernakulam	1999
9	Government Medical College, Kollam	Kollam	2013
10	Government Medical College Hospital, Manjeri	Malappuram	2013
11	Government Medical College, Palakkad	Palakkad	2014
12	Government Medical College, Idukki	Idukki	2014
13	Government Medical College, Konni	Pathanamthitta	2016

=== General Hospitals ===
Sl. No.	General Hospital	District	Year of Establishment
1	General Hospital, Thiruvananthapuram	Thiruvananthapuram	1845
2	General Hospital, Neyyattinkara	Thiruvananthapuram	
3	General Hospital, Pathanamthitta	Pathanamthitta	
4	General Hospital, Adoor	Pathanamthitta	
5	General Hospital, Alappuzha	Alappuzha	
6	General Hospital, Kottayam	Kottayam	
7	K. M. Mani Smaraka Government General Hospital, Pala	Kottayam	
8	General Hospital, Changanassery	Kottayam	
9	General Hospital, Kanjirappally	Kottayam	
10	General Hospital, Ernakulam	Ernakulam	
11	General Hospital, Muvattupuzha	Ernakulam	
12	General Hospital, Thrissur	Thrissur	
13	General Hospital, Irinjalakuda	Thrissur	
14	Panakkad Sayyid Mohammedali Shihab Thangal Smaraka Government General Hospital, Malappuram	Malappuram	
15	Shihab Thangal Smaraka Government General Hospital, Manjeri	Malappuram	
16	Government General Hospital, Kozhikode (Beach Hospital)	Kozhikode	
17	Government General Hospital, Kalpetta (M. S. Padmaiah Gowder Memorial)	Wayanad	
18	General Hospital, Thalassery	Kannur	
19	General Hospital, Kasaragod	Kasaragod	

=== District Hospitals ===
Sl. No.	District Hospital	District	Year of Establishment
1	District Hospital, Peroorkada	Thiruvananthapuram	
2	District Hospital, Nedumangad	Thiruvananthapuram	
3	District Hospital, Kollam	Kollam	—
4	District Hospital, Kozhencherry	Pathanamthitta	—
5	District Hospital, Mavelikkara	Alappuzha	—
6	District Hospital, Chengannur	Alappuzha	—
7	District Hospital, Idukki	Idukki	—
8	District Hospital, Thodupuzha	Idukki	—
9	District Hospital, Aluva	Ernakulam	—
10	District Hospital, Wadakkanchery	Thrissur	—
11	District Hospital, Palakkad	Palakkad	—
12	District Hospital, Tirur	Malappuram	—
13	District Hospital, Perinthalmanna	Malappuram	—
14	District Hospital, Nilambur	Malappuram	—
15	District Hospital, Vatakara	Kozhikode	—
16	District Hospital, Mananthavady	Wayanad	—
17	District Hospital, Kannur	Kannur	—
18	District Hospital, Kanhangad	Kasaragod	—

=== Women and Child Hospitals ===
Sl. No.	Women & Children Hospital	District	Year of Establishment
1	Women and Children Hospital, Thycaud	Thiruvananthapuram	—
2	Victoria Women and Children Hospital, Kollam	Kollam	—
3	Women and Children Hospital, Alappuzha	Alappuzha	—
4	Women and Children Hospital, Vaikom	Kottayam	—
5	Women and Children Hospital, Mattancherry	Ernakulam	—
6	Women and Children Hospital, Palakkad	Palakkad	—
7	Women and Children Hospital, Ponnani	Malappuram	—
8	Women and Children Hospital, Kozhikode (Kottapparamba)	Kozhikode	—
9	Women and Children Hospital, Kannur (Andoor)	Kannur	—
10	Women and Children Hospital, Kanhangad	Kasaragod	—

=== Taluk headquarters Hospitals ===
Sl. No.	Taluk Headquarters Hospital	District	Year of Establishment
1	Taluk Headquarters Hospital, Chirayinkeezhu	Thiruvananthapuram	—
2	Taluk Headquarters Hospital, Parassala	Thiruvananthapuram	—
3	Taluk Headquarters Hospital, Malayinkeezhu	Thiruvananthapuram	—
4	Taluk Headquarters Hospital, Karunagappally	Kollam	—
5	Taluk Headquarters Hospital, Kottarakkara	Kollam	—
6	Taluk Headquarters Hospital, Chathannoor	Kollam	—
7	Taluk Headquarters Hospital, Punalur	Kollam	—
8	Taluk Headquarters Hospital, Sasthamcotta	Kollam	—
9	Taluk Headquarters Hospital, Thiruvalla	Pathanamthitta	—
10	Taluk Headquarters Hospital, Ranni	Pathanamthitta	—
11	Taluk Headquarters Hospital, Konni	Pathanamthitta	—
12	Taluk Headquarters Hospital, Mallappally	Pathanamthitta	—
13	Taluk Headquarters Hospital, Cherthala	Alappuzha	—
14	Taluk Headquarters Hospital, Pulinkunnu	Alappuzha	—
15	Taluk Headquarters Hospital, Haripad	Alappuzha	—
16	Taluk Headquarters Hospital, Kayamkulam	Alappuzha	—
17	Taluk Headquarters Hospital, Pampady	Kottayam	—
18	Taluk Headquarters Hospital, Kuravilangad	Kottayam	—
19	Taluk Headquarters Hospital, Vaikom	Kottayam	—
20	Taluk Headquarters Hospital, Peermade	Idukki	—
21	Taluk Headquarters Hospital, Adimaly	Idukki	—
22	Taluk Headquarters Hospital, Nedumkandam	Idukki	—
23	Taluk Headquarters Hospital, Fort Kochi	Ernakulam	—
24	Taluk Headquarters Hospital, Thrippunithura	Ernakulam	—
25	Taluk Headquarters Hospital, Perumbavoor	Ernakulam	—
26	Taluk Headquarters Hospital, North Paravur	Ernakulam	—
27	Taluk Headquarters Hospital, Kothamangalam	Ernakulam	—
28	Taluk Headquarters Hospital, Chavakkad	Thrissur	—
29	Taluk Headquarters Hospital, Kodungallur	Thrissur	—
30	Taluk Headquarters Hospital, Chalakudy	Thrissur	—
31	Taluk Headquarters Hospital, Alathur	Palakkad	—
32	Taluk Headquarters Hospital, Chittur	Palakkad	—
33	Taluk Headquarters Hospital, Ottapalam	Palakkad	—
34	Taluk Headquarters Hospital, Mannarkkad	Palakkad	—
35	Taluk Headquarters Hospital, Pattambi	Palakkad	—
36	Attappady Tribal Taluk Speciality Hospital, Kottathara	Palakkad	—
37	Taluk Headquarters Hospital, Ponnani	Malappuram	—
38	Taluk Headquarters Hospital, Tirurangadi	Malappuram	—
39	Taluk Headquarters Hospital, Malappuram	Malappuram	—
40	Taluk Headquarters Hospital, Kondotty	Malappuram	—
41	Taluk Headquarters Hospital, Koyilandy	Kozhikode	—
42	Taluk Headquarters Hospital, Sulthan Bathery	Wayanad	—
43	Taluk Headquarters Hospital, Vythiri	Wayanad	—
44	Taluk Headquarters Hospital, Taliparamba	Kannur	—
45	Taluk Headquarters Hospital, Vellarikkundu (Poodamkallu)	Kasaragod	—
46	Taluk Headquarters Hospital, Mangalpady	Kasaragod	—
47	Taluk Headquarters Hospital, Bedadka	Kasaragod	—
48	Taluk Headquarters Hospital, Nileshwar	Kasaragod	—

=== Taluk Hospitals ===
Sl. No.	Taluk Hospital	District	Year of Establishment
1	Fort Taluk Hospital, Fort, Thiruvananthapuram	Thiruvananthapuram	—
2	Varkala Taluk Hospital	Thiruvananthapuram	—
3	Nemom Taluk Hospital	Thiruvananthapuram	—
4	Attingal Taluk Hospital	Thiruvananthapuram	—
5	Vithura Taluk Hospital	Thiruvananthapuram	—
6	Kadakkal Taluk Hospital	Kollam	—
7	Kundara Taluk Hospital	Kollam	—
8	Nedungolam Taluk Hospital	Kollam	—
9	Neendakara Taluk Hospital	Kollam	—
10	Thuravoor Taluk Hospital	Alappuzha	—
11	Chettikadu Rural Health Training Centre	Alappuzha	—
12	Kattappana Taluk Hospital	Idukki	—
13	Njarakkal Taluk Hospital	Ernakulam	—
14	Karuvelippady GM Taluk Hospital	Ernakulam	—
15	Angamaly Taluk Hospital	Ernakulam	—
16	Puthenvelikkara Taluk Hospital	Ernakulam	—
17	Piravom Taluk Hospital	Ernakulam	—
18	Palluruthy Taluk Hospital	Ernakulam	—
19	Chelakkara Taluk Hospital	Thrissur	—
20	Pudukkad Taluk Hospital	Thrissur	—
21	Kunnamkulam Taluk Hospital	Thrissur	—
22	Elappully Taluk Hospital	Palakkad	—
23	Areacode Taluk Hospital	Malappuram	—
24	Kuttippuram Taluk Hospital	Malappuram	—
25	Wandoor Taluk Hospital	Malappuram	—
26	Feroke Taluk Hospital	Kozhikode	—
27	Kuttiyadi Taluk Hospital	Kozhikode	—
28	Nadapuram Taluk Hospital	Kozhikode	—
29	Thamarassery Taluk Hospital	Kozhikode	—
30	Perambra Taluk Hospital	Kozhikode	—
31	Balussery Taluk Hospital	Kozhikode	—
32	Kuthuparamba Taluk Hospital	Kannur	—
33	Pazhyangadi Taluk Hospital	Kannur	—
34	Peringome Taluk Hospital	Kannur	—
35	Iritty Taluk Hospital	Kannur	—
36	Irikkur Taluk Hospital	Kannur	—
37	Panoor Taluk Hospital	Kannur	—
38	Payyannur Taluk Hospital	Kannur	—
39	Peravoor Taluk Hospital	Kannur	—
40	Thrikaripur Taluk Hospital	Kasaragod	—

=== Mental Health Centers ===
Sl. No.	Mental Health Centre	District	Year of Establishment
1	Mental Health Centre, Oolampara,Thiruvananthapuram	Thiruvananthapuram	—
2	Mental Health Centre, Thrissur	Thrissur	—
3	Mental Health Centre, Kuthiravattom, Kozhikode	Kozhikode	—

=== Leprosy Hospitals ===
Sl. No.	Leprosy Centre	District	Year of Establishment
1	Leprosy Sanitorium, Nooranad	Alappuzha	—
2	Leprosy Hospital, Thirumudikunnu, Koratty	Thrissur	—
3	Government Hospital of Dermatology (Speciality Leprosy), Kozhikode	Kozhikode	—

=== Specialty hospitals (others) ===
Sl. No.	Hospital Name	District	Year of Establishment
1	W&C Govt. Ayurvedic Maternity Hospital, Poojappura, Thiruvananthapuram	Thiruvananthapuram	—
2	Govt. Ayurveda College Hospital for Women and Children, Poojappura, Thiruvananthapuram	Thiruvananthapuram	—
3	Taluk PHC Uzhavoor	Kottayam	—
4	Taluk PHC Nalloornad	Wayanad	—
5	CHC Mattannur	Kannur	—
6	CHC Pinarayi	Kannur	—
7	Speciality Hospital, Chemmanad	Kasaragod	—

=== TB Hospitals ===
Sl. No.	TB Centre (Tuberculosis)	District	Year of Establishment
1	District TB Centre, Thiruvananthapuram	Thiruvananthapuram	—
2	District TB Centre, Kollam	Kollam	—
3	District TB Centre, Pathanamthitta	Pathanamthitta	—
4	District TB Centre, Alappuzha	Alappuzha	—
5	District TB Centre, Kottayam	Kottayam	—
6	District TB Centre, Idukki	Idukki	—
7	District TB Centre, Ernakulam (Karuvelipady, Kochi)	Ernakulam	—
8	District TB Centre, Thrissur	Thrissur	—
9	District TB Centre, Palakkad	Palakkad	—
10	District TB Centre, Malappuram (Manjeri)	Malappuram	—
11	District TB Centre, Kozhikode	Kozhikode	—
12	District TB Centre, Wayanad (Mananthavady)	Wayanad	—
13	District TB Centre, Kannur	Kannur	—
14	District TB Centre, Kasaragod	Kasaragod	—
15	TB Centre (Chest Diseases Hospital, Pulayanarkotta, Thiruvananthapuram)	Thiruvananthapuram	—
16	TB Clinic, Karuvatta, Alappuzha	Alappuzha	—
17	TB Clinic Ponnani, Malappuram	Malappuram	—
18	Speciality TB Hospital for Chest Diseases, Karunagappally	Kollam	—

== AYUSH ==
=== Homeopathy ===
As of 2025, Kerala has 34 government district homeopathic hospitals, 709 homeopathic dispensaries and 407 NHM dispensaries.

Sl. No.	Name of Govt. Dist. Homeo Hospital	District	Established
1	Government Homoeo Hospital, East Fort	Thiruvananthapuram	—
2	Government Homoeo Hospital, Attingal	Thiruvananthapuram	—
3	Government Homoeo Hospital, Neyyattinkara	Thiruvananthapuram	—
4	Government Homoeo Hospital, Karakulam	Thiruvananthapuram	—
5	Government Homoeo Hospital, Kollam	Kollam	—
6	Government Homoeo Hospital, Karunagapally	Kollam	—
7	Government Homoeo Hospital, Punalur	Kollam	—
8	Government Homoeo Hospital, Kottayam	Kottayam	—
9	Government Homoeo Hospital, Kurichy	Kottayam	—
10	Government Homoeo Hospital, Pala	Kottayam	—
11	Government Homoeo Hospital, Kottanad	Pathanamthitta	—
12	Government Homoeo Hospital, Alappuzha	Alappuzha	—
13	Government Homoeo Hospital, Cherthala	Alappuzha	—
14	Government Homoeo Hospital, Kayamkulam	Alappuzha	—
15	Government Homoeo Hospital, Muttom	Idukki	—
16	Government Homoeo Hospital, Pushpakandam	Idukki	—
17	Government Homoeo Hospital, Ernakulam	Ernakulam	—
18	Government Homoeo Hospital, Muvattupuzha	Ernakulam	—
19	Government Homoeo Hospital, North Parur	Ernakulam	—
20	Government Homoeo Hospital, Thrissur	Thrissur	—
21	Government Homoeo Hospital, Palakkad	Palakkad	—
22	Government Homoeo Hospital, Malappuram	Malappuram	—
23	Government Homoeo Hospital, Manjeri	Malappuram	—
24	Government Homoeo Hospital, Wandoor	Malappuram	—
25	Government Homoeo Hospital, Kuttippuram	Malappuram	—
26	Government Homoeo Hospital, Kozhikode	Kozhikode	—
27	Government Homoeo Hospital, Koilandi	Kozhikode	—
28	Government Homoeo Hospital, Purameri	Kozhikode	—
29	District Government Homoeo Hospital, Mananthavady	Wayanad	—
30	Government Homoeo Hospital, Kannur	Kannur	—
31	Government Homoeo Hospital, Aralam	Kannur	—
32	Government Homoeo Hospital, Kanhangad	Kasaragod	—
33	Government Homoeo Hospital, Nileswar	Kasaragod	—
34	Government Homoeo Hospital, Kalanad	Kasaragod	—

=== Indian Systems of Medicine (ISM) ===
As of 2026, Kerala has 130 hospitals and 818 dispensaries under the ISM Department. The Indian Systems of Medicine (ISM) include Ayurveda, Unani, Naturopathy and Siddha.

The below is the list of speciality institutions under ISM Department.

Name of Hospital	Location	District	Specialty
AC Shanmughadas Memorial Ayurvedic Child & Adolescent Care Centre (ACACC)	Purakkattiri	Kozhikode	Child & Adolescent Ayurvedic Care
GARIM Government Ayurveda Research Institute for Mental Health and Hygiene (GARIM)	Kottakkal	Malappuram	Mental Health & Hygiene
Kerala Institute of Sports Ayurveda and Research (KISAR)	Thrissur	Thrissur	Sports Ayurveda & Research
Government Ayurveda Marma Hospital, Kanjiramkulam	Kanjiramkulam	Thiruvananthapuram	Marma Therapy
Government Yoga Naturopathy Hospital, Varkala	Varkala	Thiruvananthapuram	Yoga & Naturopathy
Government Siddha Hospital, Vallakadavu	Vallakadavu	Thiruvananthapuram	Siddha Medicine
Government Ayurveda Visha Vaidya Hospital	Wadakkancherry	Thrissur	Ayurvedic Toxicology (Visha Vaidya)
Government Ayurvedic Toxicology Hospital	Madakkathara	Thrissur	Ayurvedic Toxicology (Visha Vaidya)

Sl. No.	Name of institution	District
1	Government Ayurveda Hospital, Kadakkavoor	Thiruvananthapuram
2	Government Ayurveda Mental Hospital, Kanjiramkulam	Thiruvananthapuram
3	Government Ayurveda Hospital, Kizhuvilam	Thiruvananthapuram
4	Government Ayurveda Hospital, Kottoor	Thiruvananthapuram
5	Government Ayurveda Hospital, Kulamuttom	Thiruvananthapuram
6	Government Ayurveda Hospital, Nedumangad	Thiruvananthapuram
7	Government Ayurveda Hospital, Palode	Thiruvananthapuram
8	Government Ayurveda Hospital, Parassala	Thiruvananthapuram
9	Government Ayurveda Hospital, Pothencode	Thiruvananthapuram
10	Government Ayurveda Hospital, Pulimath	Thiruvananthapuram
11	Government Ayurveda Hospital, Venganoor	Thiruvananthapuram
12	Government Ayurveda Dispensary, Amboori	Thiruvananthapuram
13	Government Ayurveda Dispensary, Andoorkonam	Thiruvananthapuram
14	Government Ayurveda Dispensary, Aruvikkara	Thiruvananthapuram
15	Government Ayurveda Dispensary, Aruvipuram	Thiruvananthapuram

== See also ==
- Healthcare in Kerala
- Government of Kerala
- Department of Health and Family Welfare (Kerala)
- Department of Ayush (Kerala)
