= Baby Memorial Hospital =

Multi speciality hospital in Kerala

Geography
- Location: Indira Gandhi Road, Arayidathupalam, Kozhikode, Kerala, India
- Coordinates: 11°15′37″N 75°47′34″E

Organisation
- Type: Private

Services
- Emergency department: Level I trauma center
- Beds: 500

History
- Opened: 1987

Links
- Website: babymemorialhospitals.com
- Lists: Hospitals in India

The Baby Memorial Hospital (BMH) is a multi-speciality hospital located in Kozhikode. Founded in 1987 by K. G. Alexander in memory of his father K. V. Varghese alias Baby, BMH provides 500 beds facility with over 40 medical and surgical departments, 16 operation theatres, and 11 ultra-modern ICUs.

== Hospital network ==
The branches of BMH are located at Kozhikode, Kannur, Payyanur, Thodupuzha and Perumbavoor.

== Academics ==
- Baby Memorial School of Nursing, established in 1995, offers 3.5 years general nursing and midwifery program recognized by Kerala Nurses and Midwives Council (KNMC) and Indian Nursing Council (INC).
- Baby Memorial College of Nursing, commenced in 2002, affiliated to the Kerala University of Health Sciences and is recognized by KNMC and INC. It offers B.Sc, M.Sc, Post basic B.Sc and PhD courses in nursing.
- Baby Memorial College of Allied Medical Sciences, commenced in 2012, offers both degree and diploma courses.

== Philanthropic activities ==
In December 2023, the hospital, in association with ViswaSanthi Foundation announced a project Step Forward, offering free pediatric-orthopedic surgery program under which 25 physically challenged children would undergo surgery and treatment free of cost. The project covers children with issues such as cerebral palsy, congenital limb deformities and scoliosis.

In May 2025, Mohanlal announced a new collaborative initiative between his Viswasanthi Foundation and Baby Memorial Hospital, aimed at providing affordable liver transplants to children from economically weaker sections of society at a significantly lower expense. The project is designed to support families who often can't afford such life-saving surgeries.
