= Regional Institute of Ophthalmology, Thiruvananthapuram =

Coordinates: 8°29′56″N 76°56′24″E

- Regional Institute of Ophthalmology

Geography
- Location: Red-cross road, Thiruvananthapuram, Thiruvananthapuram district, Kerala, India

Organisation
- Type: Specialist
- Affiliated university: Kerala University of Health Sciences

Services
- Emergency department: Yes
- Speciality: Ophthalmology

History
- Founded: 1905; 121 years ago as Government Eye Hospital

The Regional Institute of Ophthalmology, Thiruvananthapuram is a government eye hospital located in Thiruvananthapuram, Kerala. It is the highest government level referral hospital in the field of ophthalmology in Kerala state. In 1995, it was upgraded to Regional Institute of Ophthalmology.

== Overview ==
Regional Institute of Ophthalmology, Thiruvananthapuram is the highest government level referral hospital in the field of ophthalmology in Kerala state. As of 2025, it is the only Regional Institute of Ophthalmology in Kerala. The hospital is located near the General Hospital at Red Cross Road in Thiruvananthapuram city. Sunayanam, the first mobile eye hospital in Kerala operates under Thiruvananthapuram Regional Institute of Ophthalmology.

Including retinal and vitreo-retinal surgeries, hospital performs around 10,000 surgeries annually. Daily about 600 people are consulted as referrals, and about 200 people come in directly for treatment without a referral. Specialised clinics for squint, glaucoma, conjunctivitis, Paediatric Ophthalmology, Cornea and Low vision aid clinics are functioning here. The hospital also has 250 inpatient beds.

== History ==
The hospital was established as Government Eye Hospital in 1905, during the reign of king Sree Moolam Thirunal of Travancore. With the establishment of the Thiruvananthapuram Medical College in 1951, it became the ophthalmology department of the Medical College. In 1995, the hospital was separated from Medical college and upgraded to the Regional Institute of Ophthalmology, an autonomous institution.

== Courses offered ==
- Post graduate degree in ophthalmology
- Bachelor's degree in optometry

== Development ==
The new Specialty Block of the Regional Institute of Ophthalmology, Thiruvananthapuram was inaugurated in February 2019.

== Punarjyothi ==
On 13 February 2019, Kerala government and the RIO Trivandrum Alumni Association jointly started a rehabilitation center for visually challenged patients under the Punarjyothi project.
