= Muringeri =

Village

Muringeri is a village located in Anjarakkandy in Kannur district, Kerala, India.
