= Assam Nurses Midwives & Health Visitors Council =

Assam Nurses' Midwives' & Health Visitors' Council
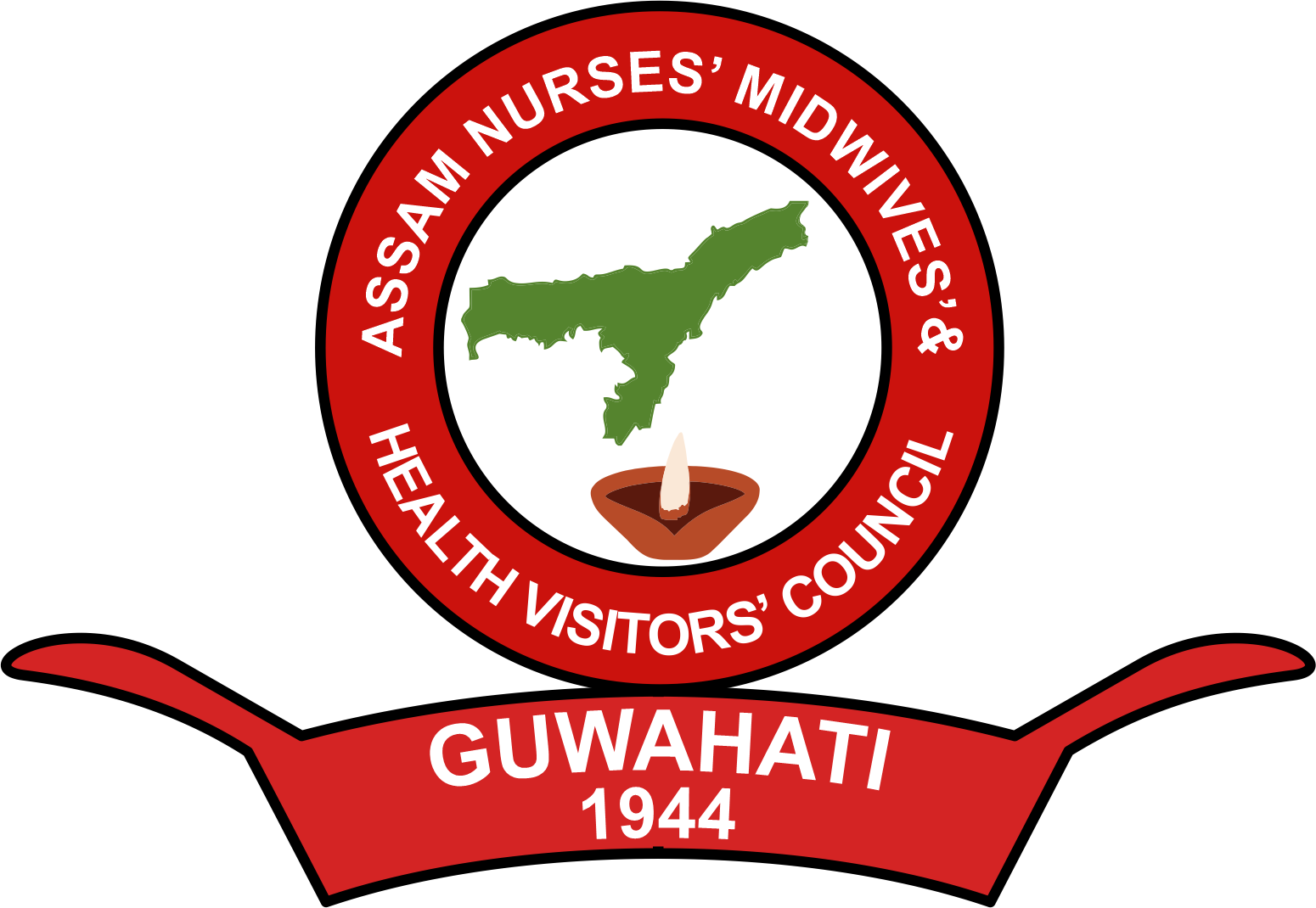
- Nickname: Assam Nursing Council
- Formation: 1944
- Founder: Ms. Amy Bullock
- Type: Autonomous Statutory Body
- Headquarters: O/o Director of Health Services
- Location: Hengrabari, Guwahati, Assam, India
- President: Dr. Umesh Ch. Phangcho, Director of Health Services, Assam
- Registrar: Mrs. Junu Sarma
- Affiliations: Indian Nursing Council, Government of Assam
- Website: www.assamnursingcouncil.com

The Assam Nurses' Midwives' & Health Visitors' Council is an autonomous statutory body responsible for the regulation of nursing and midwifery education and the registration of qualified nursing professionals in the state of Assam, India. The council functions under the provisions of the Assam Nurses' Midwives' & Health Visitors' Registration Act, 1944.

The council regulates the standards of nursing education and professional practice and maintains the state register of nurses, midwives, auxiliary nurse midwives (ANMs), and health visitors in Assam.

== History ==
The Assam Nurses' Midwives' & Health Visitors' Registration Act was enacted by the Assam Legislative Assembly in 1944 with the objective of establishing a statutory framework for the regulation of nursing education and practice in the state. The act received the assent of the governor of Assam on 6 June 1953 and was subsequently published in the Assam Gazette on 17 June 1953. The act extends to the whole of the State of Assam.

The legislation was framed as a result of the sustained efforts of Amy Bullock, a British nursing professional who played a significant role in the development of organized nursing services in Assam. She served as the first registrar of the council and was instrumental in laying the foundation for structured nursing regulation and professional standards in the state.

== Legal framework ==
The council derives its authority from the Assam Nurses' Midwives' & Health Visitors' Registration Act, 1944. Section 17(a) of the act empowers the council to regulate nursing education, grant recognition to nursing institutions, register qualified professionals, and take disciplinary action in cases of professional misconduct.

== Composition and administration ==
The administration of the council is carried out in accordance with the provisions laid down in the act. The council is headed by a registrar and governed by an executive body responsible for policy decisions, regulatory oversight, and implementation of statutory functions.

== Functions and responsibilities ==
The principal functions of the Assam Nurses' Midwives' & Health Visitors' Council include:

- Granting recognition to nursing institutions in accordance with the provisions of the act
- Registration of qualified nurses, midwives, auxiliary nurse midwives (ANMs), and health visitors
- Maintenance and periodic updating of the state register of nursing professionals
- Regulation and monitoring of nursing education and nursing services across the state
- Regulation of professional conduct and initiation of disciplinary action in cases of malpractice or professional misconduct
- Establishment of professional linkages and reciprocity with nursing councils of other states

== Examinations ==
The council conducts examinations for the following nursing courses:

- Auxiliary Nurse Midwife (ANM)
- General Nursing and Midwifery (GNM)
- Lady Health Visitor (LHV)
- Diploma in Psychiatric Nursing (DPN)

The council is responsible for prescribing examination standards, evaluation processes, and certification for these courses.

== Role in nursing education and services ==
The council plays a key role in ensuring the quality and uniformity of nursing education in Assam. It monitors compliance with prescribed curricula, institutional infrastructure, and faculty requirements. Through its regulatory functions, the council contributes to maintaining professional competence and ethical standards in nursing services across the state.

== See also ==
- Indian Nursing Council
