= Kerala Nurses and Midwives Council =

Indian Nursing Council

- Affiliations: Autonomous; Monitored by Indian Nursing Council
- Location: Thiruvananthapuram, Kerala, India
- Campus: Various Campus in Kerala State
- Registrar: Prof. Valsa. K. Panicker
- Website: https://www.knmc.org/contact.html

In India, the Kerala Nurses and Midwives Council was established in 1953 under the provisions of Nurses and Midwives Act and works as an autonomous body under the Government of Kerala, Department of Health and Family Welfare. It is a regulatory body for nurses and education in nursing in Kerala and It is monitored by Indian Nursing Council.

== Main functions ==
- To establish and maintain a uniform standard of nursing education for Nurses, Auxiliary Nurse Midwives and Health Visitors by doing periodical inspection of the institution.
- To give registration to Nurses and Midwives who had undergone their training from recognized institutions.
- To conduct undergraduate courses and to issue diploma and registration certificate.
- To conduct examinations for GNM, ANM, Post Basic Diploma Courses and Health Supervisor Courses.
- Power to withdraw the recognition of qualification in case the institution fails to maintain its standards.

== See also ==
- Nursing in India
- Indian Nursing Council
