= Government Mental Health Centre, Kozhikode =

- Government of Kerala

Geography
- Location: Calicut, Kerala, India
- Coordinates: 11.25490°N 75.80023°E

Organisation
- Care system: Public
- Type: Speciality
- Affiliated university: Department of Health and Family Welfare, Government of Kerala

Services
- Emergency department: Yes
- Beds: 474

History
- Founded: 1872

Links
- Website: gmhckkd.com
- Lists: Hospitals in India

Government Mental Health Centre, Kozhikode is a public mental health institution and hospital run by Government of Kerala, located at Puthiyara Pottamal Road, Kozhikode, Kerala. The hospital serves northern Kerala and neighbouring states.

== Notable people ==
- Dr S. Santhakumar, who was appointed as the superintendent of the hospital in 1962. He was the first qualified psychiatrist in the history of the hospital.
- Dr. R.L. Saritha, former superintendent of the hospital and now serves as the director of health services, Government of Kerala.
- Dr. N. Rajendran, former superintendent of the hospital.
- Dr K.C. Remasan, superintendent (2018 to present).
