= ViswaSanthi Foundation =

Indian non-profit organization

- Founded: 2015; 11 years ago
- Founder: Mohanlal
- Type: Non-governmental organisation
- Purpose: Education; Health care
- Location: Kochi, Kerala, India
- Key people: Mohanlal; Damodaran M. Vasudevan; Major Ravi
- Website: viswasanthifoundation.com

ViswaSanthi Foundation is a non-profit organization established by actor Mohanlal in the names of his parents Viswanathan and Santhakumari in 2015. It is registered as a Section-8 Company of the Companies Act 2013, under the name ViswaSanthi Development Foundation. The foundation was started with the objective of creating and delivering high impact and focused programs to the under privileged sections of the society in the areas of health care and education.

== Activities ==
In 2018, Mohanlal met with Prime Minister Narendra Modi and briefed about the foundation's social initiatives. The foundation has sent relief materials to different parts of Kerala during 2018 and 2019 Kerala floods including new house to the family of a flood rescue operator and children's education for one of the victims.

The foundation launched the Amrita-ViswaSanthi Health Care project to help children below the age of 18 years from socio-economically backward sections suffering from heart ailments and meet their heart surgery expenses in Amrita hospital. Simran, a five-year-old girl from a Bihar village, becomes the first non-Malayali beneficiary of this scheme. During COVID-19 pandemic in India, the foundation has donated PPE kits and N95 masks to healthcare workers and police officials in Kerala, Tamil Nadu, Pune and laptops, tablets and television sets for schools across Kerala. The foundation had extended its support to BMC run hospitals in Mumbai by donating PPE kits to Lokmanya Tilak Municipal General Hospital, Chhatrapati Shivaji Maharaj Hospital and to healthcare workers in Andheri and Dharavi.

The foundation donates an autonomous robot, KARMI-Bot, for the isolation ward at Government Medical College, Ernakulam, which helps to dispense food, medicine, collect the trash left away by COVID-19 patients, perform disinfection and enable video call between the doctors and patients.

In May 2021, the foundation has provided beds with oxygen and ventilator support and portable X-ray machines to various hospitals in Kerala. They also provide support for the installation of Oxygen pipeline to two wards and Triage ward of Government Medical College, Ernakulam. The foundation executes this ₹1.5 crore project with EY Global Delivery Services (EY GDS) and UST.

In April 2022, the foundation, with the support of EY GDS, chose 20 students from the 6th grade in tribal villages from Attappadi, to provide them with free education, mentorship and resources, for the next 15 years in order to secure their future.

In June 2023, the foundation, in association with EY GDS, established an automated drinking water plant to alleviate the water shortage faced by residents of ward-1 of Edathua gram panchayat in the Kuttanad region. The initiative aims to provide clean and safe drinking water to about 1000 individuals, a few schools and places of worship in the area.

In December 2023, the foundation, in association with Baby Memorial Hospital announced a project Step Forward, offering free pediatric-orthopedic surgery program under which 25 physically challenged children would undergo surgery and treatment free of cost. The project covers children with issues such as cerebral palsy, congenital limb deformities and scoliosis.

In June 2024, the foundation has joined the ‘'Idukki Oru Midukki'’ project, coordinated by the Idukki district administration and the District Skill Committee. Mohanlal inaugurated a newly set up library at Anchuruli and also the distribution of adult diapers at a function in Thodupuzha.

When the landslide hit the Wayanad district in July 2024, Mohanlal donated ₹25 lakhs to CMDRF. He also visited the landslide-hit Wayanad as a Lieutenant Colonel (Hon) of Indian Territorial Army in August 2024 and announced ₹3 crores aid for the rehabilitation of the region from ViswaSanthi Foundation. Major Ravi, managing director of the foundation, said that the foundation will oversee the rebuilding of Mundakkai Government Lower Primary School, which was collapsed in the landslide.

In May 2025, Mohanlal announced a new collaborative initiative between the foundation and Baby Memorial Hospital, aimed at providing affordable liver transplants to children from economically weaker sections of society at a significantly lower expense. The project is designed to support families who often can’t afford such life-saving surgeries.

In April 2026, as part of its Shanti Theertham project, an initiative aimed at providing sustainable drinking water solutions in underserved areas, the foundation installed multiple automated, solar-powered reverse osmosis (RO) plants in the Kuttanad region. After an initial donation of three plants, in May 2026, the foundation commissioned its fifth solar automated RO facility at Vezhapra, Kuttanad, in collaboration with Tata Elxsi. This plant is designed to supply up to 5,000 liters of clean drinking water daily, providing free and safe water access to approximately 300 local families.
