= Indian Nursing Council =

Regulatory body for nurses and nurse education in India

- Abbreviation: INC
- Formation: 1947; 79 years ago
- Type: Public
- Legal status: Active
- Purpose: Nursing, Nurse education
- Headquarters: New Delhi, India
- Location: 8th Floor, NBCC Center, Plot No. 2, Community Center, Okhla Phase-I, New Delhi, Delhi 110020
- Coordinates: 24.8794319°N 71.2543738°E
- Official language: English
- President: T. Dileep Kumar
- Vice President: Dr. Jogendra Sharma
- Parent organization: Ministry of Health and Family Welfare
- Website: www.indiannursingcouncil.org

The Indian Nursing Council is a national regulatory body for nurses and nurse education in India. It is an autonomous body under the Government of India, Ministry of Health & Family Welfare, constituted by the Central Government under section 3(1) of the Indian Nursing Council Act, 1947 of the Indian parliament. According to the original act the function of the council is to provide "uniformity in nursing education".

== Functions ==
Its functions are as follows:

- Recognition of nursing qualifications in India.^{(10.1)}
- Granting any nursing qualification: Grants a qualification in general nursing, midwifery, health visiting or public health nursing.^{(10.2)}
- The Council may enter into negotiations with any authority [in any territory of India to which this Act does not extend or a foreign country] which by the law of such territory or country is entrusted with the maintenance of a register of nurses midwives or health visitors; for the settling of a scheme of reciprocity for the recognition of nursing qualifications.^{(10.3)}
- Indian Nursing Council has the Power to require information as to courses of study and training and examinations.^{(12)}
- Inspect any institution recognized as a training institution, and to attend examinations held for the purpose of granting any recognized qualification or recognized higher qualification in India.^{(13)}
- Withdrawal of recognition ^{(14)}: The council may withdraw the recognition of an institution recognized by a State Council for the training of nurses, midwives or health visitors does not satisfy the requirements of the council.
- Power to make regulations ^{(16)}: The Council may make regulations not inconsistent with the Indian Nursing Council Act generally to carry out the provisions of this Act, and in particular and without prejudice to the generality of the foregoing powers.

== State-level nursing councils ==
There are many registered state-level nursing councils. They are granted autonomous rights by the nursing council.

Council Body	State	Year of Establishment
Andhra Pradesh Nurses & Midwives Council	Andhra Pradesh	1963
Arunachal Pradesh Nursing Council	Arunachal Pradesh	
Assam Nurses Midwives & Health Visitor Council	Assam	1953
Bihar Nurses Registration Council	Bihar	
Chhattisgarh Nursing Council	Chhattisgarh	
Kerala Nurses and Midwives Council	Kerala	1953
Maharashtra Nursing Council	Maharashtra	
Delhi Nursing Council	New Delhi	1997
Goa Nursing Council	Goa	
Haryana Nurses & Nurses-Midwives Council	Haryana	
Punjab Nurses Registration Council	Punjab	2006
Karnataka Nursing Council	Karnataka	1961
Uttar Pradesh Nurses & Midwives Council	Uttar Pradesh	1934
Tamil Nadu Nurses And Midwives Council	Tamil Nadu	1926
Rajasthan Nursing Council	Rajasthan	1964
Madhya Pradesh Nurses Registration Council	Madhya Pradesh	1973
West Bengal Nursing Council	West Bengal	1936

== See also ==
- Auxiliary Nurse Midwife (ANM)
- Nursing in India
