= Government Medical College, Idukki =

Government-funded medical college in India

- Type: Government college
- Established: 2014; 12 years ago
- Affiliations: National Medical Commission
- Academic affiliations: Kerala University of Health Sciences
- Principal: Dr. Tomy Mappalakayil
- Location: Cheruthoni, Idukki, Kerala, India; 9.848°N 76.962°E
- Campus: Rural
- Administration: Directorate of Medical Education, Government of Kerala
- Nickname: GMCI
- Website: www.gmci.in

Government Medical College, Idukki (abbreviated GMCI) is a government medical college in Kerala, India. Established in 2014, the campus is located in Cheruthoni, Idukki. The institute is affiliated to Kerala University of Health Sciences, Thrissur and its MBBS programme is approved by the National Medical Commission (NMC) since 2022.

== History ==
The medical college was established in 2014 and had permission to admit 50 students. But in 2017, the Medical Council of India denied accreditation due to lack of proper infrastructure and facilities and the college could not admit new students. The existing students were shifted to other medical colleges. In 2022, the National Medical Commission granted approval for admitting 100 students for MBBS.

On November 15, 2022, the college commenced classes for first year MBBS students. 100 students secured admission in the college.

== See also ==
- List of medical colleges in Kerala
