= Kannur Medical College, Anjarakandy =

Medical school in Kannur, India

Kannur Medical College
- Kannur Medical College Anjarakandy
- Type: Private self-financing
- Established: 2006
- Affiliations: Medical Council of India
- Academic affiliations: Kerala University of Health and Allied Sciences and Kannur University
- Principal: Dr. Vidyadhar NKR Rao
- Undergraduates: MBBS, BSc Nursing, BSc MLT, BPT, DET, DOT, DRT, DCVT, B-pharm
- Postgraduates: MD, MS DNB, MSc Nursing, MPT,
- Location: Kannur, Kerala, India
- Campus: 218 acres
- Registration: Medical Council of India
- Nicknames: KMCH, Anjarakandy Medical College, Anjarakandy Hospital
- Website: kannurmedicalcollege.ac.in

Kannur Medical College is a medical college located in Anjarakandy, India. Spread across a 218-acre campus, it is the largest self financed medical college in north Kerala.

The hospital attached to the medical college comprises the following departments.

- General Medicine
- General Surgery
- Orthopaedics
- Paediatrics
- Obstetrics and Gynaecology
- Otorhinolaryngology (ENT) & Head and Neck Surgery
- Ophthalmology
- Dermatology
- Psychiatry
- Neurosurgery
- Neurology
- Nephrology
- Urology
- Cardiology

The hospital has 1000 beds with spacious wards and special rooms.
