= Government Ayurveda Medical College Kannur =

College in Kerala, India

Coordinates: 12°04′28″N 75°17′18″E

- Pariyaram Ayurveda Medical College
- Other name: GACK
- Type: Government Medical College
- Established: 1991
- Affiliations: Kerala University of Health Sciences-Thrissur
- Academic affiliations: Kerala University of Health and Allied Sciences-Since 2010 and Kannur University-up to 2009
- Principal: Sindhu. C
- Location: Kannur, Kerala, India
- Registration: National Council for Indian Systems of Medicine-NCISM
- Website: www.gack.kerala.gov.in

The Government Ayurveda Medical College Kannur is situated in Pariyaram, Kannur. It is one of the three Ayurveda medical colleges in Kerala. The college has 150 bed strength. There are 14 clinical departments functioning there; they offer one UG course, a Bachelor's in Ayurvedic Medicine and Surgery.and 5 PG Courses and 1 Diploma Course, Certificate Courses in Ayurveda Therapist and Nursing. In the Kerala University of Health Sciences' North Zone arts festival, they emerged in second place. The administrative control vests with the Department of Ayush, Government of Kerala.
