= Government TD Medical College, Alappuzha =

Government medical college in kerala

Government T. D. Medical College
- Other name: TDMC
- Type: Government
- Established: 1963; 63 years ago
- Founder: N. V. Prabhu
- Accreditation: National Medical Commission
- Academic affiliations: Kerala University of Health Sciences
- Principal: Dr. B. Padma Kumar
- Location: Alappuzha, Kerala, India
- Administration: Department of Health and Family Welfare, Government of Kerala
- Website: tdmcalappuzha.orggenmedtdmc.com

Government T. D. Medical College, Alappuzha is a government medical college situated in the suburban area of Vandanam, nine kilometres (5.6 mi) south of the Alappuzha (previously Alleppey city), facing the NH 66, in Alappuzha district of Kerala State, South India. The initials T.D. stand for Thirumala Devaswom (Sanskrit: "belonging to the Lord of Thirumala"), as the Medical College was started in 1963 under the patronage of the T.D. Temple at Anantha Narayana Puram of Alappuzha.The founder of T.D.Medical College is Sri. N.V.Prabhu aka Narayana Venkateshwara Prabhu, a great personality hailing from Alappuzha. The emblem of the college, designed by Sri.N.V.Prabhu shows the Hindu god Narasimha (man lion), on top as the college was first under the TD trust The first batch of MBBS classes were started in August 1963 for 50 students. The Kerala government had agreed to upgrade the district headquarters hospital at Alappuzha and handed it over to the Medical College management, to be used as teaching hospital for the medical students and Government Order No.G.O.(MS).263/73/HD dt. 23 October 1973 was issued accordingly. Thus this became the fourth Government Medical College in the state.

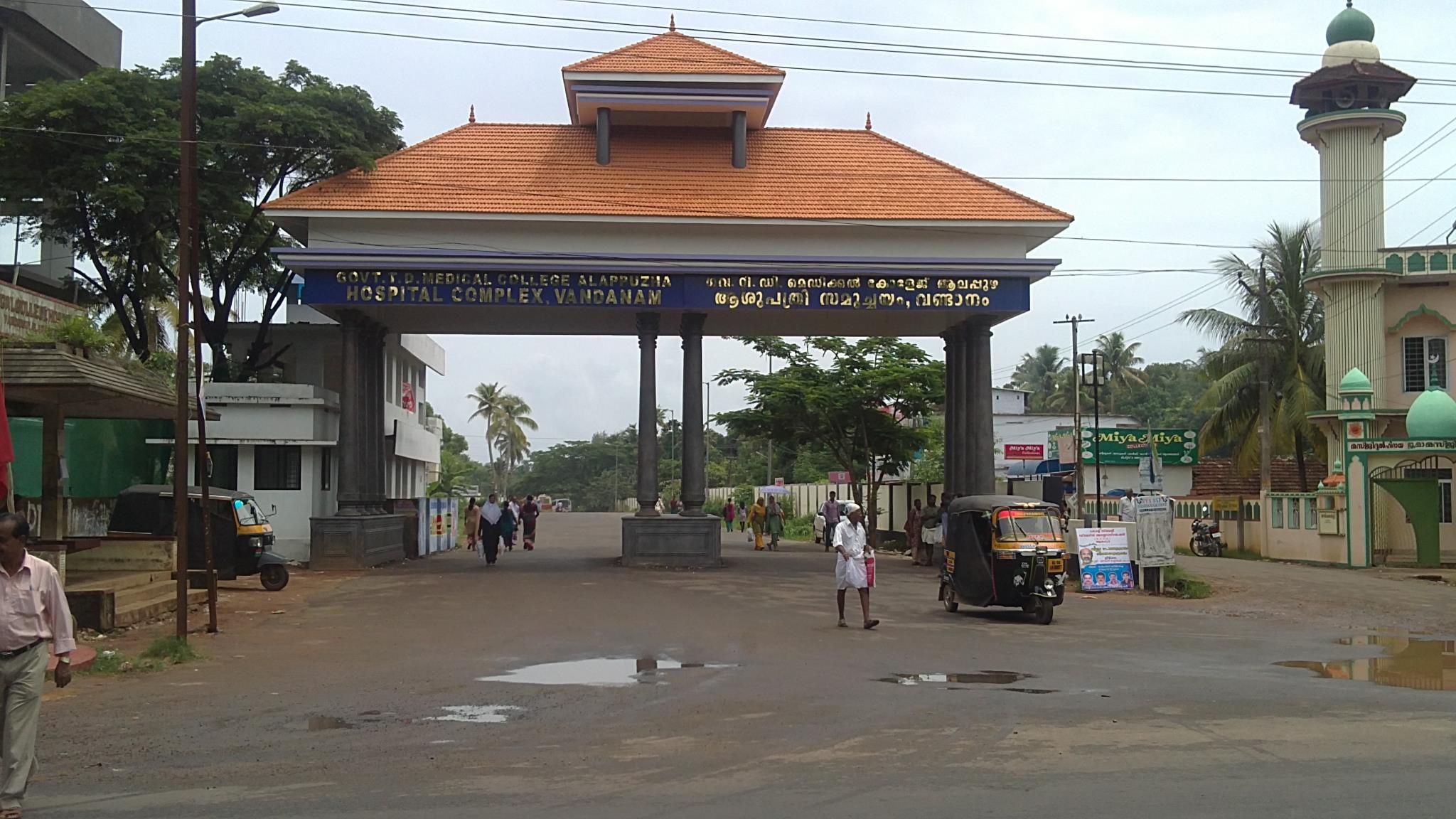
T D Medical College entrance

== History ==
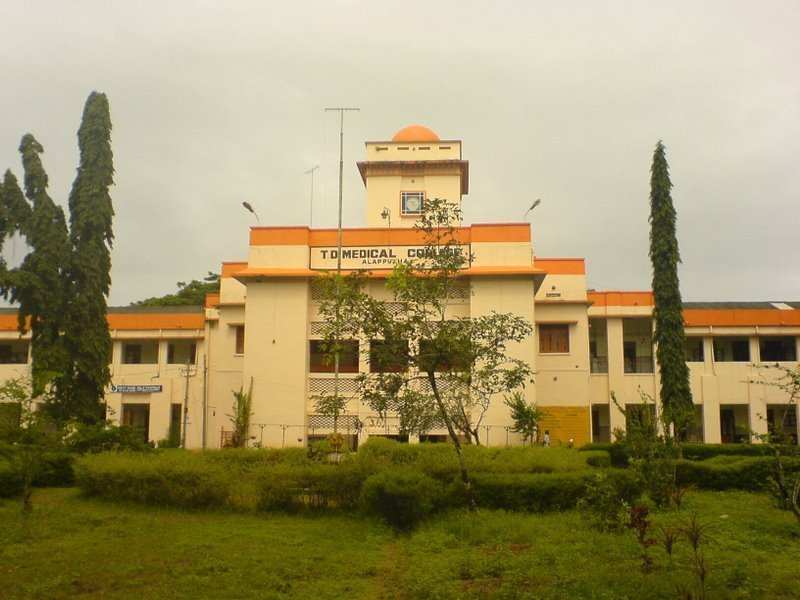
T D Medical College

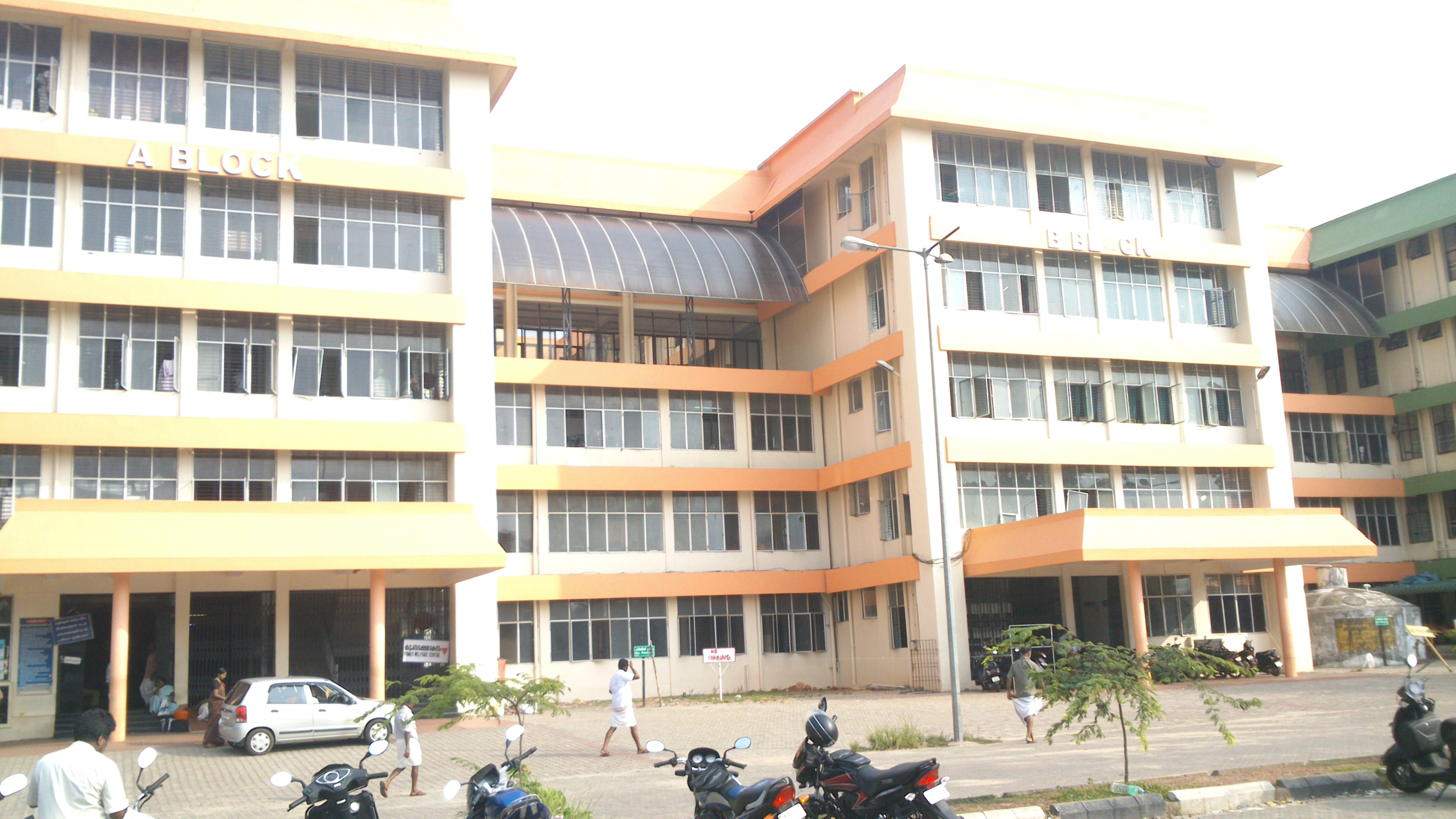
A & B complex in Alappuzha Medical College

T.D. Medical College is situated in the suburban area of Vandanam, 9 km (5.6 mi) south of the Alappuzha (previously Alleppey) town, facing the NH 66, in Alappuzha district of Kerala State, South India. The initials T.D. stand for Thirumala Devaswom, which in Sanskrit means belonging to the Lord of Thirumala, since this medical college was started in 1963 under the patronage of the T.D. Temple at Anantha Narayana Puram of Alappuzha. Initially the management of the college was done by the Kerala Cultural & Educational Society. It was later brought under a trust called "T.D. Medical College Trust", which was headed by the President of the Thirumala Devaswom. The secretary of the trust was Sri. N. V. Prabhu, Thoppil House, Alappuzha. Sri. N. V. Prabhu was the main driving force and founder of the T. D. Medical College, Alappuzha. It is his brain child for he gave his heart and soul for building this private medical college, one of the first kind in the history of Kerala. The day-to-day administration of the college was done by the T.D. Medical College Administrative Council. A total of 145 acres of land was purchased at Vandanam, in the coastal belt for the future development of the college campus, to include the hospitals, hostels, residential quarters.

The construction of the building started with the foundation stone laying ceremony by R. Sankar, Chief Minister of Kerala on 6 March 1963 and the classes started in August 1963. Due to the objection raised by the Kerala University in running the medical college in this state collecting capitation fee from the students, the T.D.M.C. management ran into financial problems and the Kerala Government came forward for their help and took over the management of the institution from 17 October 1967 for a period of five years initially, under an agreement executed between the T.D. Medical College Trust and the Government. Since the T.D. Medical College Trust did not come forward to take back the management of the college at the end of the stipulated initial five-year period, as per conditions in the agreement, the college became vested with the Government of Kerala from 17 October 1972 and Government order No.G.O.M.S.263/73/HD dt. 23 October 1973 was issued accordingly. Thus this became the fourth Government Medical College in the state. Since no compensation whatsoever was paid to the T.D.M.C.Management by the Government during take over, the name T.D.Medical College is still retained in the records.

The number of seats for the M.B.B.S course in T.D. Medical College, Alappuzha was 50 to begin with. It was raised to 100 in 1967. But as per the recommendation of the Indian Medical Council, the number was again reduced to 80 in 1973. It was again raised to 100 as per the recommendation of the Indian Medical Council in 1979. Now the number of seats has raised to 150 from the academic year 2007-2008 onwards. Post Graduate Course in Medicine and Surgery (two seats each) were started in the year 1982-1983 and Paramedical Course for MLT was started in the year 1985–1986 with 15 seats. Diploma Course in Pharmacy was also started with 35 seats and later it increased to 40 seats.

In 1967 when the Government temporarily took over the management of the medical college there were only two wings of the college building in the ground floor constructed by the private management at a cost of about Rs.8.8 lakhs. The central portion housing the library in the ground floor and the auditorium in the first floor were constructed by the Government at a cost of about Rs.13 lakhs, which was completed in 1971. The construction of the remaining part of the first floor was done after the medical college was taken over by the Government. The regulations of the Medical Council of India demands the existence of Collegiate Hospital in Medical College Campus itself. As part of the plan for shifting the Medical College Hospital to the College Campus, the following five departments were shifted to the newly constructed hospital building (now it is Old Block I & II) at Neerkunnam near Vandanam, on 25 February 1991: Psychiatry, Dermatology & Venereology, Radiotherapy, Physical Medicine and Rehabilitation, Dentistry.

The paediatric department was shifted to the new block construction in the Vandanam Medical College Hospital Complex in 2005, whereas the General Medicine and Allied Departments were shifted in January 2007. Further expansions through NABARD funds and State Plan allocations have led to the construction of more diagnostic and surgical blocks. The completion of the shifting process from Alappuzha to Vandanam was declared on 12 January 2010 by the Chief Minister. The hospital buildings cover an area of about 28,000 square meters (300,000 sq ft) in the larger 162-acre (66 ha) institutional complex.

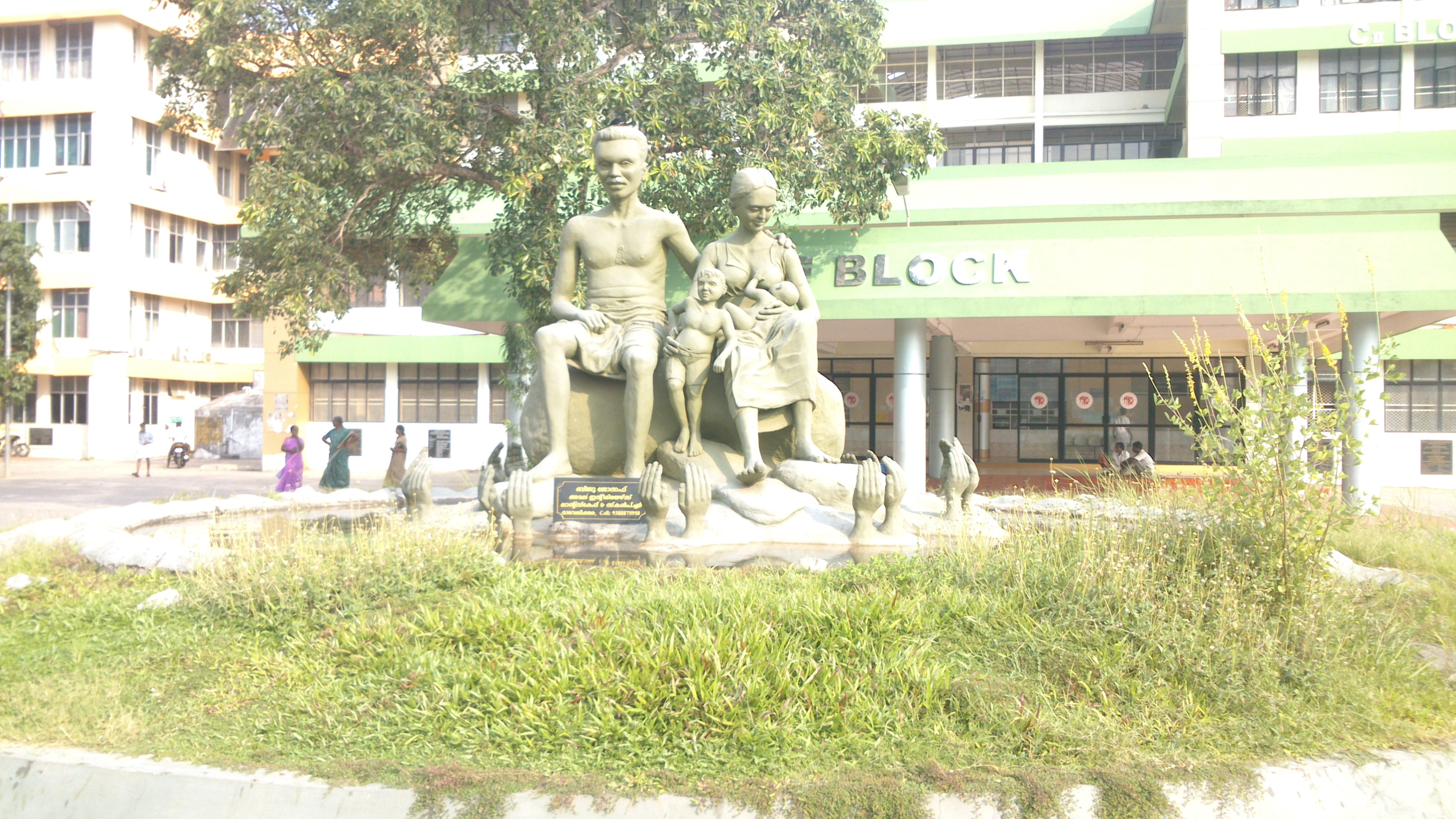
Sculpture in Alappuzha Medical College Campus

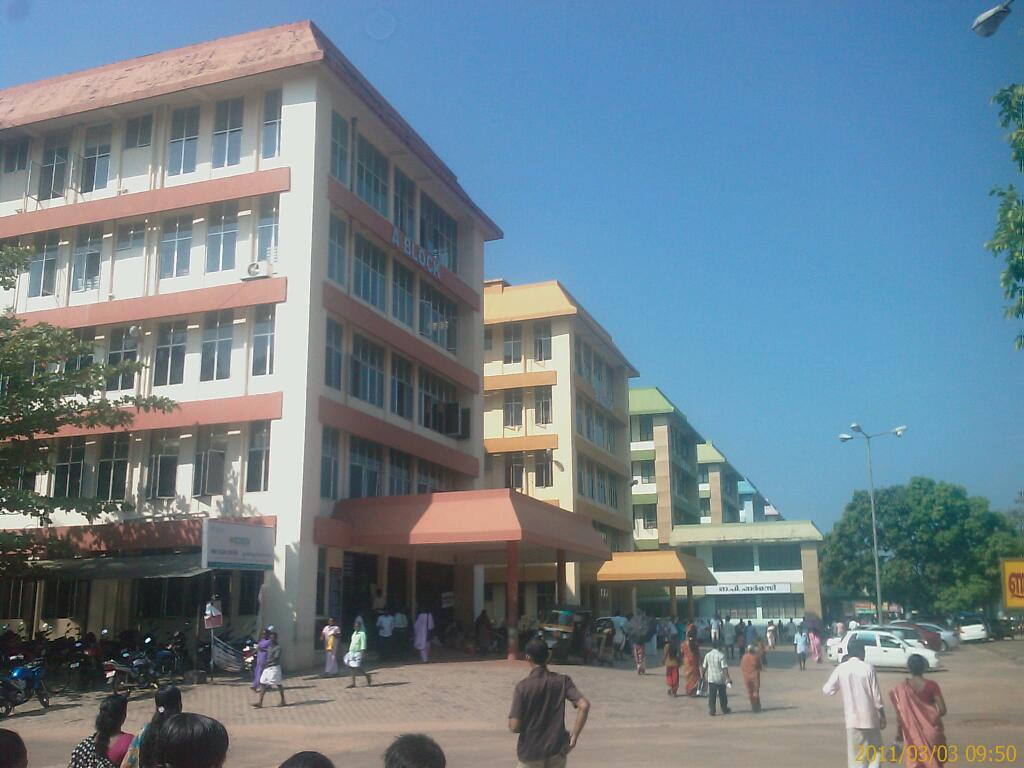
T D Medical College Hospital Complex

== Golden Jubilee celebrations ==
The President of India, Shri Pranab Mukherjee, inaugurated the Golden Jubilee celebration of the T D Medical College at Alappuzha in Kerala on 16 March 2013.

== Departments ==
- Anaesthesiology
- Anatomy
- Biochemistry
- Cardio Thoracic Surgery
- Cardiology
- Community Medicine
- Dental
- Dermatology and Venerology
- Forensic Medicine
- Gastroenterology
- General Medicine
- General Surgery
- Genito Urinary Surgery
- Microbiology
- Nephrology
- Neurology
- Neuro Surgery
- Obstetrics & Gynaecology
- OMFS
- Ophthalmology
- Orthopaedics
- Otorhinolaryngology (E.N.T.)
- Paediatric Surgery
- Paediatrics
- Pathology
- Pharmacology
- Pharmacy
- Physical Education
- Physical medicine and rehabilitation
- Physiology
- Psychiatry
- Pulmonary Medicine
- Radiodiagnosis
- Radiotherapy
- Surgery
- Transfusion Medicine & Immunohaematology
- Urology

== Courses offered ==
Main courses offered include MBBS (175 seats), post-graduate training in basic specialties (M.D., MS and diploma courses) and super-specialities (DM and MCh), BDS, BSc Nursing, MSc Nursing in four specialities Maternal and Child Health Nursing, Medical Surgical Nursing, Child Health Nursing, Community Health Nursing and other paramedical courses.

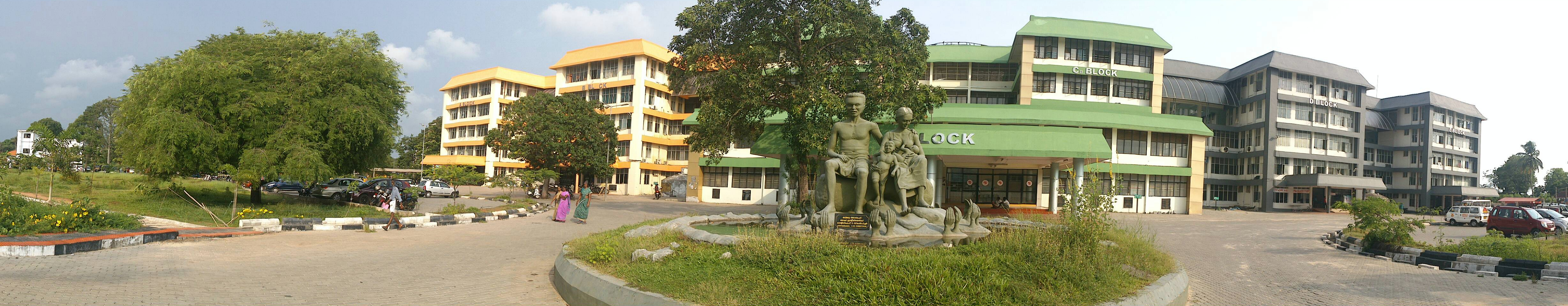
Panoramic view of Alappuzha medical college

== Graduation ==
After completion of the courses, the medical and nursing colleges separately organize the graduation ceremonies. There has been no separate graduation ceremonies after the post graduation courses. The university does not have a part in these ceremonies since the legal ban on convocation ceremonies in the universities by the government.

== See also ==
- Calicut Medical College
- Government Medical College, Thrissur
- Kollam ESIC Medical College Hospital
- Kottayam Medical College
- Trivandrum Medical College
- Government Medical College, Ernakulam
