= Malabar Medical College, Kozhikode =

Medical school in Kerala, India

Malabar Medical College Hospital and Research Centre
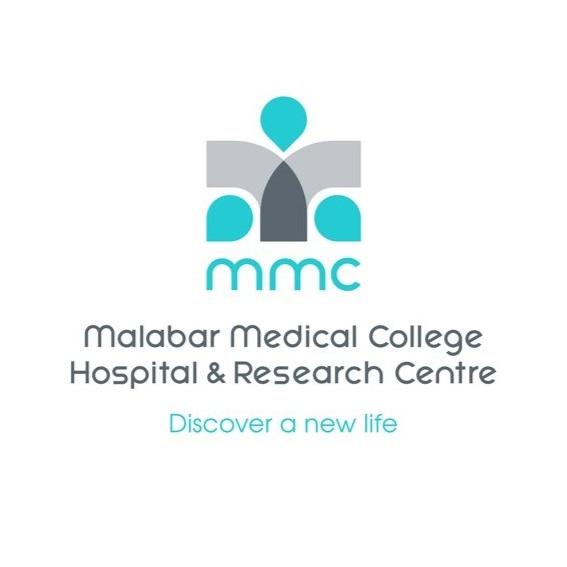
- Motto: Discover a new life
- Type: Private Medical College
- Established: 2010
- Accreditation: National Medical Commission
- Affiliations: Kerala University of Health Sciences
- Chairman: Anil Kumar
- Principal: Dr. P. V. Narayanan
- Undergraduates: 200 Per Year (M.B.B.S)
- Postgraduates: 28 Per Year
- Location: Kozhikode, Kerala, 673323, India
- Campus: 32 acres
- Language: English, Malayalam
- Website: academy.mmchospital.in; mmchospital.in

Malabar Medical College Hospital and Research Centre is a School of Medicine located in Modakkalur, Ulliyeri, Kerala, India. The medical school shares a campus with the Malabar Medical College Hospital, Kozhikode (MMC Hospital, Kozhikode). It is by the State Highway connecting Kozhikode and Kuttiady, about 20 km from Kozhikode city. The MMC Hospital provides health care to a major area of North Malabar region consisting of Calicut, Kannur, and Wayanad districts. The teaching hospital has 890 beds. The college is affiliated to the Kerala University of Health Sciences (KUHS) and is associated with Sree Anjaneya Medical Trust.

Malabar Medical College Hospital and Research Centre was established in the year 2010 as the first private medical college in Kerala to have 150 M.B.B.S seats at inception. The medical college annually accepts 200 students from the academic year 2022-23 for M.B.B.S undergraduate course based on performance in the national medical entrance exam NEET (UG). The undergraduate course consists of four and a half years of academic training, followed by one year of internship as a House Surgeon.

The Medical College accepts postgraduate trainees in a number of specialties. Currently, 28 postgraduate training seats are offered in the specialties of MD General Medicine (4 seats), MS General Surgery (2 seats), MD Paediatrics (4 seats), MS Orthopaedics (4 seats), MS Ophthalmology (3 seats), MS ENT (2 seats), MD Anesthesiology (2 seats), MD Psychiatry (2 seats), MD Dermatology (3 seats), MD Community Medicine (2 seats).

The Medical College also made its niche in the sports arena and was given the University Sports Championship continuously for three years (2014–2015, 2015–2016, and 2016–2017).

== Academic Divisions ==
- Malabar Medical College & Research Centre
- Malabar Medical College Hospital
- Sree Anjaneya Institute of Dental Science
- Sree Anjaneya College of Nursing
- Sree Anjaneya College of Paramedical Science
