= Oolampara =

Oolanpara or Oolampara is a suburb in the city of Thiruvananthapuram and is situated between Peroorkada and Sasthamangalam. The Government Mental Health Center is located here.

== Etymology ==
Oolanpara is an amalgamation, of the words ‘Oolan’ and ‘Para’. The slightly elevated terrain of this area, suggestive of a hill is supposedly the reason for the word ‘Para’(meaning ‘Rock')

Local legend is that the wolves used to assemble in the middle of the night near a hill. The authenticity of the hill is questionable because there are no indications of a hilly topography in the area. Nevertheless, a boulder may have existed at the place and the gregorious behaviour of wolves is widely accepted.

== Mental asylum ==
The present place is famous for the Government Mental Health Centre whose fame extends even to the southern districts of Tamil Nadu, a neighboring state of Kerala.
