= Government Medical College, Konni =

Medical college in Kerala, India

Government Konni Medical College
- Type: Government
- Established: 2022; 4 years ago
- Parent institution: Kerala University of Health Sciences
- Accreditation: NMC
- Principal: Dr. Jayasree L
- Location: Konni, Pathanamthitta, Kerala, India; 9.226°N 76.880°E
- Campus: Rural
- Governance: Directorate of Medical Education, Government of Kerala
- Website: konnimedicalcollege.org

Government Medical College Konni or GMC Konni in Konni, Pathanamthitta is the seventh government medical college in Kerala.

== Location ==
The Medical college is situated on Nedumpara hill near Vattamon in Konni taluk, Pathanamthitta District. The construction is completed.

== History ==
The foundation stone for Government Medical College, Konni in Pathanamthitta district was laid on 26 January 2013 by Oommen Chandy, the then Chief Minister of Kerala. The campus had 50 acres (20 ha) of land which was received by the Soil Conservation Department at Vattamon in Aruvappulam grama panchayat. The Budget was Rs 200 crore, which includes the State Government's budget allocation and the credit taken from NABARD, for the construction work in the first phase of the project. On 14 September 2020, Chief Minister Pinarayi Vijayan inaugurated the Medical College hospital. The inpatient capacity will be 300.

The college has been admitting 100 students since 2022.
