= Department of Health and Family Welfare (Kerala) =

Family health care department in Kerala

Department of Health and Family Welfare Government of Kerala

Department overview
- Jurisdiction: Kerala, India
- Headquarters: Annex -II, 6th Floor Room No.603 Government Secretariat, Thiruvananthapuram Kerala-695001
- Annual budget: ₹12,081.66 crore (US$1.3 billion) (2026–27, revised)
- Minister responsible: K. Muraleedharan, Minister for Health and Family Welfare
- Department executive: Rajan N Khobragade IAS, Additional Chief Secretary (Health)
- Child agencies: Directorate of Health Services; Directorate of Medical Education; Department of Drugs Control; Commissionerate of Food Safety
- Website: health.kerala.gov.in

The Health and Family Welfare Department is an administrative department under the Government of Kerala, responsible for public health, medical services, family welfare, and the management of healthcare institutions across the state. The department formulates health policies, oversees statewide health infrastructure, implements national health programs, and monitors public health initiatives.

It is one of the largest administrative departments of Kerala and functions through various directorates, autonomous bodies, and missions. The department also oversees medical education, preventive health programs, health insurance schemes, and family welfare initiatives. It has its headquarters in Thiruvananthapuram, Kerala.

== Leadership ==
The Department of Health and Family Welfare is headed by a Cabinet Minister of the Government of Kerala, and the incumbent Minister is K. Muraleedharan.

Administratively, the department is headed by a Principal Secretary to Government, an IAS officer. The Principal Secretary is supported by Additional Secretaries, Deputy Secretaries, Under Secretaries, and other staff posted in the Secretariat.

The operational wings of the department include:

- Directorate of Health Services (DHS)
- Directorate of Medical Education (DME)
- Drugs Control Department
- Commissionerate of Food Safety (Food Safety Department)

== Functions ==
- Formulation and implementation of health policies and State Health Action Plans.
- Operation and administration of government hospitals, public health facilities, and specialty medical institutions.
- Implementation of National Health Mission (NHM) and other centrally sponsored schemes relating to public health and family welfare.
- Disease surveillance, epidemic prevention, and public health response activities through the State Surveillance Unit.
- Administration of health-related missions, boards, and autonomous institutions.

== Departments under ==
- Directorate of Health Services (DHS)
- Directorate of Medical Education (DME)
- Commissionerate of Food Safety, Kerala
- Drugs Control Department, Kerala
- National Health Mission (NHM)

=== Directorate of Health Services (DHS) ===
This is the main operational department of the Health and Family Welfare Department. It's headed by a Director, who functions as the Head of department. The Director of Health Services supervise and administer the allopathic medical institutions such as District Hospitals, Taluk Hospitals, Community Health Centres (CHCs), Public Health Centres (PHCs) and other government health clinics across the state. Each of 14 district has a District Medical Officer (DMO), who supervise government allopathic health institutions in the district. Each government hospital is under control of Superintendent, and Each Public Health Centres is under Medical Officer (I/C).

=== Directorate of Medical Education (DME) ===
The Director of Medical Education is responsible for administration of government medical colleges and medical education institutions in the state.

The Government Medical College Hospitals functions under the administrative control the DME. The Department is responsible for supervision and administration of medical colleges, dental colleges, nursing colleges and other medical institutions.

Major Institutions and Bodies under the Department:

- Government Medical Colleges in Kerala
- State Health Systems Resource Centre – Kerala (SHSRC)
- Public Health Laboratories and Research Centres

=== Drugs Control Department ===
The Drugs Control Department, formed in 1961, is the statutory authority responsible for regulating the manufacture, sale, and distribution of drugs and cosmetics in the state. It enforces the provisions of the Drugs and Cosmetics Act, 1940 to ensure the quality, safety, and efficacy of medicines and to prevent the circulation of spurious or substandard drugs, thereby safeguarding public health.

The Drugs Control Department is headed by a Drugs Controller and assisted by deputy drugs controllers and assistant drugs controllers at headquarters. The enforcement wing consists senior/regional drugs inspectors and drugs inspectors who functions at the field level. The department also has a Drugs Testing Laboratory, known as the Government Analyst Laboratory, at Thiruvananthapuram, headed by a Chief Government Analyst.

=== Commissionerate of Food Safety ===
The Commissionerate of Food Safety enforces food safety laws to ensure safe and hygienic food, prevent adulteration, and protect public health. The department is headed by a Commissioner of Food Safety, an IAS cadre officer, and has its headquarters in Thiruvananthapuram.

The department has two primary wings: the Enforcement Wing and the Analytical Wing. The Enforcement Wing consists of four regional-level offices headed by Deputy Commissioners of Food Safety, 14 district-level offices headed by Assistant Commissioners of Food Safety, and 140 circle-level offices headed by Food Safety Officers. The Food Safety Circle Offices are coterminous with the State’s Legislative Assembly constituencies.

The Analytical Wing comprises the Government Analytical Laboratory at Thiruvananthapuram, two regional laboratories at Kozhikode and Ernakulam, and a District Food Testing Laboratory at Pathanamthitta.

== Organisations ==
The following is the autonomous institutions functioning under the department.

Organisation	Website
Centre for One Health-Kerala (COH-K)	www.onehealth.kerala.gov.in
Child Development Centre Kerala (CDC)	cdckerala.org
Cochin Cancer Research Centre (CCRC)	ccrckerala.com
eHealth Kerala	ehealth.kerala.gov.in
Indian Institute of Diabetes (IID)	www.iidkerala.org
Institute for Communicative and Cognitive Neurosciences (ICCONS)	www.iccons.co.in
Institute of Mental Health and Neurosciences (IMHANS)	www.imhans.ac.in
Kerala Dental Council (KDC)	dentalcouncil.kerala.gov.in
Kerala Health Research and Welfare Society (KHRWS)	khrws.kerala.gov.in
Kerala Medical Services Corporation Limited (KMSCL)	kmscl.kerala.gov.in
Kerala Nurses and Midwives Council (KNMC)	www.knmc.org
Kerala State AIDS Control Society (KSACS)	ksacs.kerala.gov.in
Kerala State Blood Transfusion Council (KSBTC)	ksbtc.kerala.gov.in
Kerala State Council for Clinical Establishment (CCE)	clinicalestablishments.kerala.gov.in
Kerala State Institute of Health and Family Welfare (KSIHFW)	ksihfw.kerala.gov.in
Kerala State Medical Councils (KSMC)	medicalcouncil.kerala.gov.in
Kerala State Mental Health Authority (KSMHA)	www.ksmha.org
Kerala State Organ and Tissue Transplant Organisation (K-SOTTO)	ksotto.kerala.gov.in
Kerala State Pharmacy Council (KSPC)	pharmacycouncil.kerala.gov.in
Kerala University of Health Sciences (KUHS)	www.kuhs.ac.in
Malabar Cancer Centre (PGIOSR)	mcc.kerala.gov.in
Regional Cancer Centre, Thiruvananthapuram	www.rcctvm.gov.in
Regional Institute of Ophthalmology (RIO)	ioctn.org/rio-thiruvananthapuram/
State Health Agency Kerala (SHA)	sha.kerala.gov.in
State Health Systems Resource Centre – Kerala (SHSRC-K)	shsrc.kerala.gov.in
State Institute of Medical Education and Technology (SIMET)	simet.in
State TB Cell (NTEP)	ntep.in
Apex Trauma & Emergency Learning Centre (AT&ELC)	

== Health infrastructure ==
The Directorate of Health Services (DHS) look after the administration and supervision of the following government hospitals and institutions. These institutions are governed by respective local-self government institutions.

Sl. No.	Institution / Category	Total	Ref.
Hospitals & Major Institutions			
1	General Hospitals	18	
2	District Hospitals	18	
3	Taluk Head Quarter Hospitals	48	
4	Taluk Hospitals	40	
5	Community Health Centres	185	
6	Community Health Centres converted to FHCs	41	
7	24×7 Primary Health Centres	3	
8	24×7 Primary Health Centres converted to FHCs	156	
9	Primary Health Centres	2	
10	Primary Health Centres converted to FHCs	688	
11	District TB Centres	14	
12	Mobile Unit/Dispensaries/Health Clinics	49	
13	Women & Children Hospitals	10	
14	Mental Health Centres	3	
15	TB Hospitals	4	
16	Leprosy Hospitals	3	
17	Speciality Hospitals	7	
Other Institutions			
18	Schools of Nursing	15	
19	Training Centres	10	
20	Government Public Labs	10	
21	District Vector Control Units	14	
22	Others (DHS, DMOH, OFFSET Press)	16	
23	Health Subcentres	5416	

== Challenges and medical negligence concerns ==
Despite Kerala’s reputation for a strong public healthcare system, the sector has faced scrutiny over instances of alleged medical negligence, infrastructure gaps, and administrative challenges, particularly during the tenure of the second Pinarayi Vijayan ministry (2021–2026).

=== Foreign investment and healthcare corporatisation concerns ===
In Kerala, some very large foreign investment companies such as Blackstone and KKR are buying major stakes in private hospitals. For example, in 2024, KKR invested about ₹2,500 crore (300 million US dollars) to take control of Baby Memorial Hospital, while Blackstone-backed Quality Care invested around ₹3,500 crore (400 million US dollars) to acquire most of KIMS Health hospitals. Some doctors, economists, and public health experts are worried that this growing corporatisation of healthcare could slowly make treatment more expensive because large investment firms mainly aim to increase profits and financial returns. They fear this could increase out-of-pocket spending for ordinary families, especially since Kerala households already spend around ₹8,655 in rural areas and ₹10,341 in urban areas on hospital treatment, which is more than double the national average. Experts are also concerned that if government hospitals continue facing problems such as lack of specialist care, advanced facilities, weak infrastructure, and slow policy implementation, more people may become dependent on private hospitals and insurance-led healthcare systems. Critics warn that this could gradually push Kerala toward a more Western-style healthcare model, where insurance companies, hospital corporations, and private investors play a larger role in deciding access to treatment, often leading to higher medical costs, more tests and procedures, rising insurance premiums, and unequal access between richer and poorer patients. Because of these concerns, health experts are calling for stronger public hospitals, better regulation of treatment charges, more transparency in hospital billing, and tighter oversight of insurance-driven healthcare services so that medical care remains affordable and accessible for ordinary people.

=== Reported medical negligence cases ===
Several high-profile cases of alleged medical negligence in government hospitals have been reported. In one instance, a surgical instrument (artery forceps) was found inside a patient years after a procedure at a government medical college hospital in Alappuzha, leading to police action and disciplinary proceedings.

In another case, a guide wire used during surgery was left inside a patient’s chest at a government hospital in Thiruvananthapuram. The state health department acknowledged the error and initiated action against those responsible.

Additional cases have involved complications following surgical procedures, including instances where patients reported severe pain due to retained surgical materials, prompting police complaints and legal proceedings.

Cases involving deaths during treatment have also been reported. For example, a woman died during treatment at Kottayam Medical College Hospital, with her family alleging negligence, prompting an internal investigation.

In July 2025, the collapse of a portion of a building at Kottayam Medical College Hospital resulted in the death of a patient and led to allegations regarding delays in rescue operations and infrastructure maintenance.

=== Systemic and infrastructure issues ===
Beyond individual cases, concerns have been raised regarding systemic issues in public healthcare institutions. Reports have indicated infrastructure deficiencies, including hospital buildings requiring urgent repair or demolition.

Medical professionals have also reported increased pressure and legal scrutiny following negligence allegations, with some noting a shift towards “defensive medicine” practices in hospitals.

=== Data and broader trends ===
Comprehensive state-level data on medical negligence cases is not consistently published. However, national-level data indicates a rise in litigation, with approximately 65,000 medical negligence cases filed across India in 2025 in courts and consumer forums.

Experts have noted that factors such as administrative lapses, documentation issues, and systemic pressures contribute to such cases alongside clinical errors.

=== Government response ===
The Government of Kerala has maintained that reported incidents are isolated and not indicative of systemic failure. Authorities have initiated inquiries, suspended personnel in certain cases, and introduced corrective measures to strengthen patient safety mechanisms.

Officials have also highlighted that Kerala continues to perform strongly on national health indicators and remains one of the leading states in public healthcare delivery.

=== Political and public response ===
Medical negligence cases have been a subject of political debate in Kerala, with opposition parties raising concerns about accountability and governance. The government has stated that such incidents are being addressed through institutional mechanisms and reforms.

Public discourse on the issue has expanded through media coverage and discussions within the medical community.

== List of Health Ministers ==
The following is the list of ministers who held the health portfolio in various governments:

No.	Minister	Term	Party	Chief Minister
1	A. R. Menon	1957-1959	Indipendent	E. M. S. Namboodiripad
2	V. K. Velappan	1960–1962	Indian National Congress	Pattom A. Thanu Pillai
3	M. P. Govindan Nair	1962–1964	Indian National Congress	R. Sankar
4	B. Wellington	1967–1969	Communist Party of India (Marxist)	E. M. S. Namboodiripad
5	K.M. George	1969–1970		C. Achutha Menon
6	N. K. Balakrishnan	1970–1977	Praja Socialist Party	C. Achutha Menon
7	J. Chitharanjan	April 1977		K. Karunakaran
7	J. Chitharanjan	1977–1978		A. K. Antony
7	J. Chitharanjan	Oct 1978 - Nov 1978		P. K. Vasudevan Nair
8	K.P Prabhakaran	1978 –1979		P. K. Vasudevan Nair
9	N. Bhaskaran Nair	Oct 1979 –Dec 1979		C. H. Mohammed Koya
10	Vakkom Purushothaman	1980–1981		E. K. Nayanar
11	R. Sundaresan Nair	1981–1982		K. Karunakaran
12	KGR Kartha	1982–1983		K. Karunakaran
13	K.P. Ramachandran Nair	1983–1985		K. Karunakaran
14	A. C. Shanmughadas	1987–1991		E. K. Nayanar (LDF)
15	R. Ramachandran Nair	1991-1994	National Democratic Party (Kerala)	K. Karunakaran (UDF)
16	V.M. Sudheeran	1995-1996	Indian National Congress	A. K. Antony (UDF)
17	A. C. Shanmughadas	1996–2000	NCP	E. K. Nayanar (LDF)
18	V.C Kabeer	2000–2001	NCP	E. K. Nayanar (LDF)
19	P. Sankaran	2001–2004	Indian National Congress	A. K. Antony (UDF)
20	K. K. Ramachandran Master	2004–2006	Indian National Congress	Oommen Chandy (UDF)
21	P. K. Sreemathy	2006 –2011	Communist Party of India (Marxist)	V. S. Achuthanandan(LDF)
22	V. S. Sivakumar	2011–2016	Indian National Congress	Oommen Chandy (UDF)
23	K. K. Shailaja	2016–2021	Communist Party of India (Marxist)	Pinarayi Vijayan (LDF)
24	Veena George	2021–2026	Communist Party of India (Marxist)	Pinarayi Vijayan (LDF)
25	K. Muraleedharan	2026—Incumbent	Indian National Congress	V.D Satheesan (UDF)

== See also ==
- Department of Ayush (Kerala)
- List of government hospitals in Kerala
