= Government Medical College, Kollam =

- Government of Kerala (Department of Health and Family Welfare)
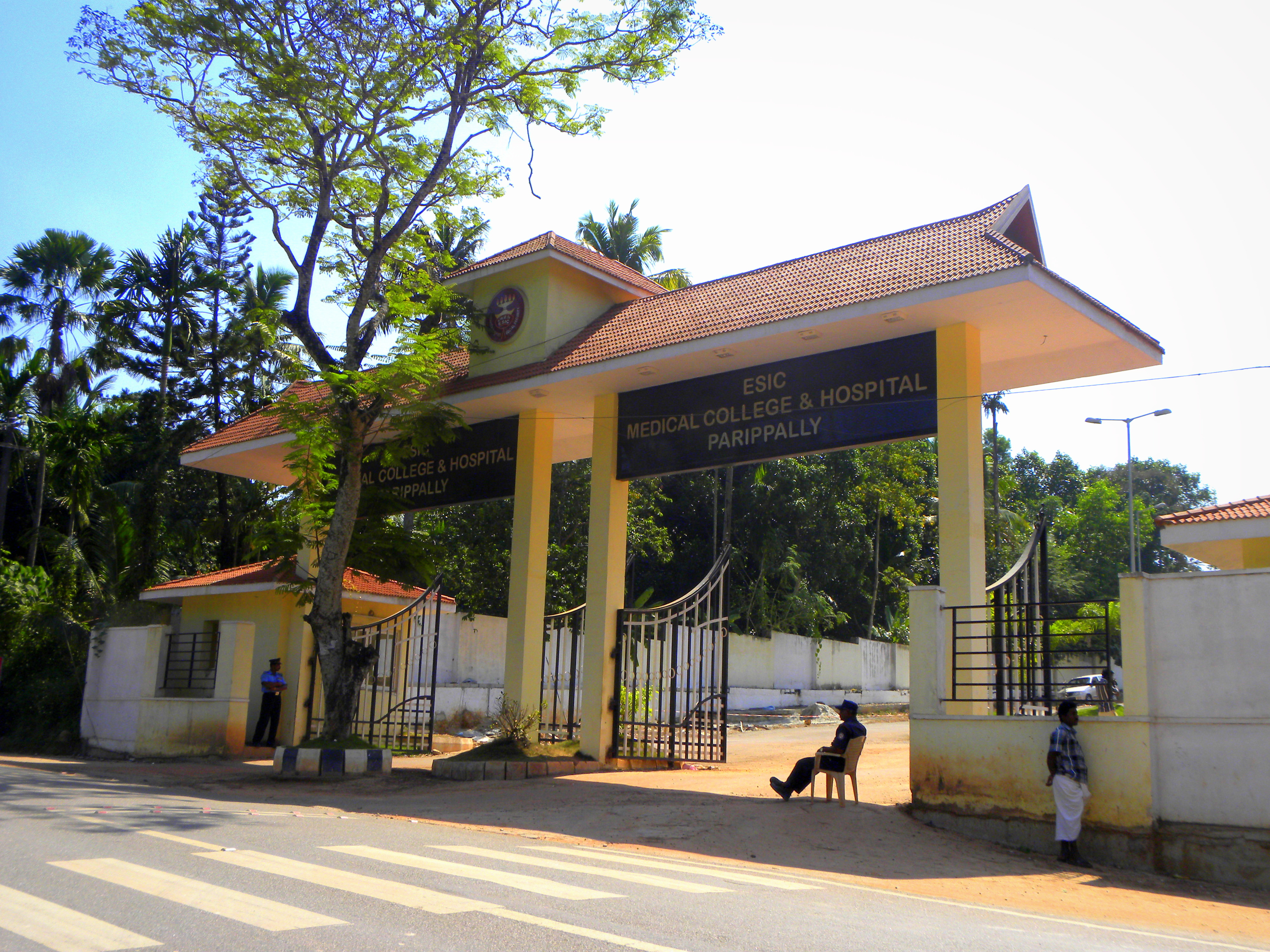
- Entrance of Government Medical College, Kollam

Geography
- Location: Parippally, Kollam, Kerala, India
- Coordinates: 8.811°N 76.749°E

Organisation
- Type: Medical College
- Affiliated university: Kerala University of Health Sciences
- Patron: Dr. Abdul Rasheed M. H. Principal

Services
- Emergency department: Yes
- Beds: 500

History
- Former names: ESIC Medical College Hospital, Parippally
- Founded: 21 December 2013

Links
- Website: GMC Kollam

Government Medical College, Kollam, formerly ESIC Medical College, Parippally, is the first Government medical college in Kollam district, Kerala, India. It is situated 21 km (13 mi) south of Kollam city and 9.6 km (6.0 mi) east of Paravur town. The College was initially established by the Employees State Insurance Corporation, a Government of India establishment, and later acquired by the Government of Kerala.

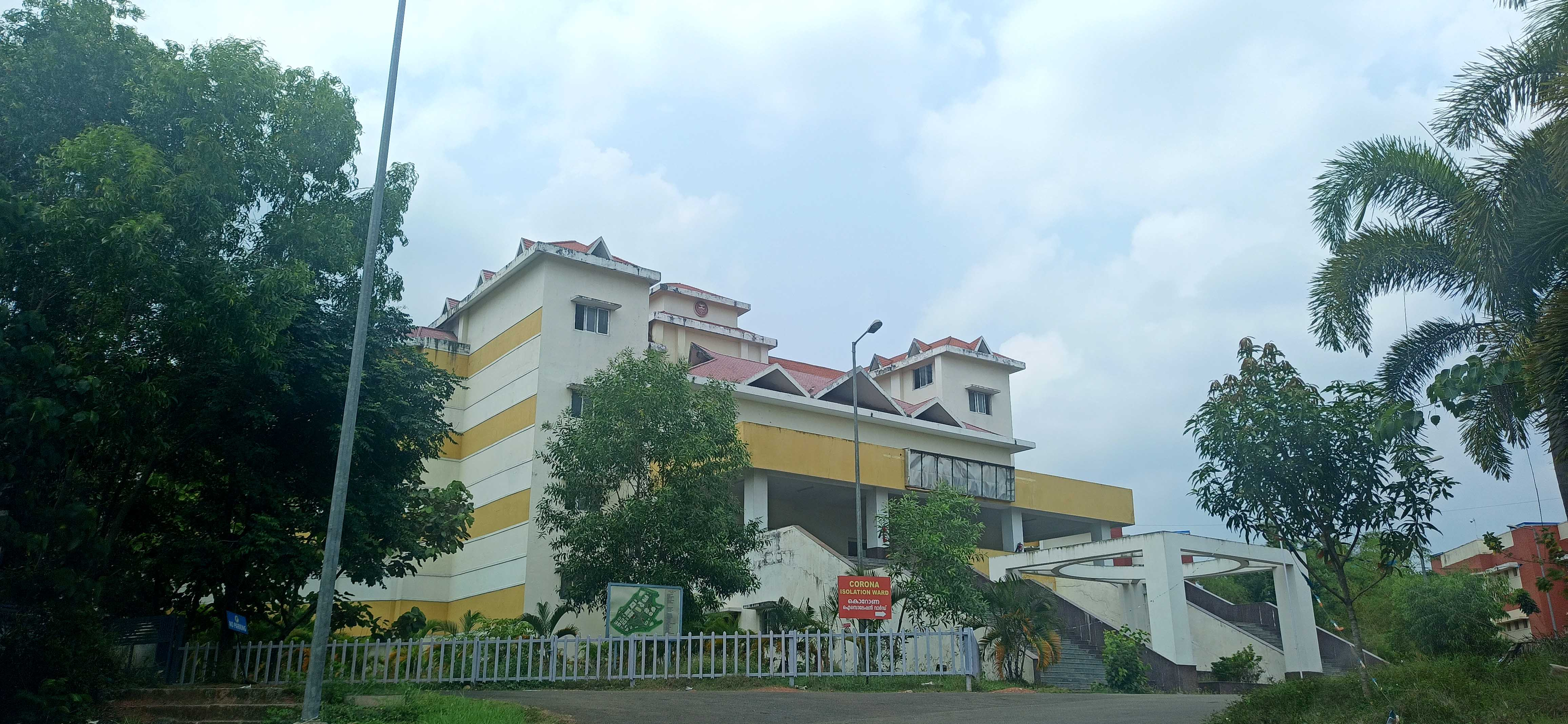
Building in GMC Kollam

== History ==
Initially it was named ESIC medical College and was constructed by the ESI Corporation of India. It was the second medical college project from ESI Corporation of India in the country and the first of its kind in Kerala state. Rs. 480 crores worth ESIC Medical College was inaugurated by Chief Minister Oommen Chandy in Parippally on 21 December 2013, and was the largest Medical College in Kerala the terms of buildings (33 blocks). With the inauguration of the ESI Medical College in Parippally, the demand of the people of Kollam district to have a medical college of their own in the government sector has been fulfilled. Parippally ESIC Medical College is a 500 bedded medical college with a total built-up area of 12,029 m^{2}.

The medical college was initially a project of ESI Corporation. Kodikunnil Suresh, the then Central Deputy Minister of Labour and Employment, announced the ESIC medical college project at Parippally in Kollam during 2012–2013. The works for hospital has been completed and commissioned in December 2013. But in 2014, the NDA lead central ministry decided not to go ahead with ESIC Medical college projects based on a report of the sub-committee that, the projects would probably exhaust the ESI corporation fund. Later in 2016, the UDF lead Kerala Government had decided to take over the institution. But the government failed to appoint needed faculties and other employees for the institution.

Later, in the months of July–August, the LDF lead new government in Kerala had taken the necessary actions for staff appointments to get the first batch of MBBS at Kollam Government Medical College in 2016-17-year itself. They have created 108 additional posts at the medical college.

On 14 August 2016, Chief Minister of Kerala, Pinarayi Vijayan inaugurated Kollam Government Medical College. A modern mortuary complex, capable to conduct two autopsies at a time, would start functioning in the medical college from 1 August 2019. A forensic medicine department led by a team including a police surgeon, a deputy police surgeon and two assistant police surgeons will also start functioning in the medical college hospital.

== Location ==
The Medical College Hospital is located at Parippally, one of the southern border towns of Kollam District.

- Nearest railway station: Paravur railway station (9.7 km [6.0 mi])
- Nearest major rail head: Kollam Junction (24.2 km [15.0 mi])
- Nearest airport: Thiruvananthapuram International Airport (45.2 km [28.1 mi])
- Nearest city: Kollam (26 km [16 mi])

== Dimensions ==
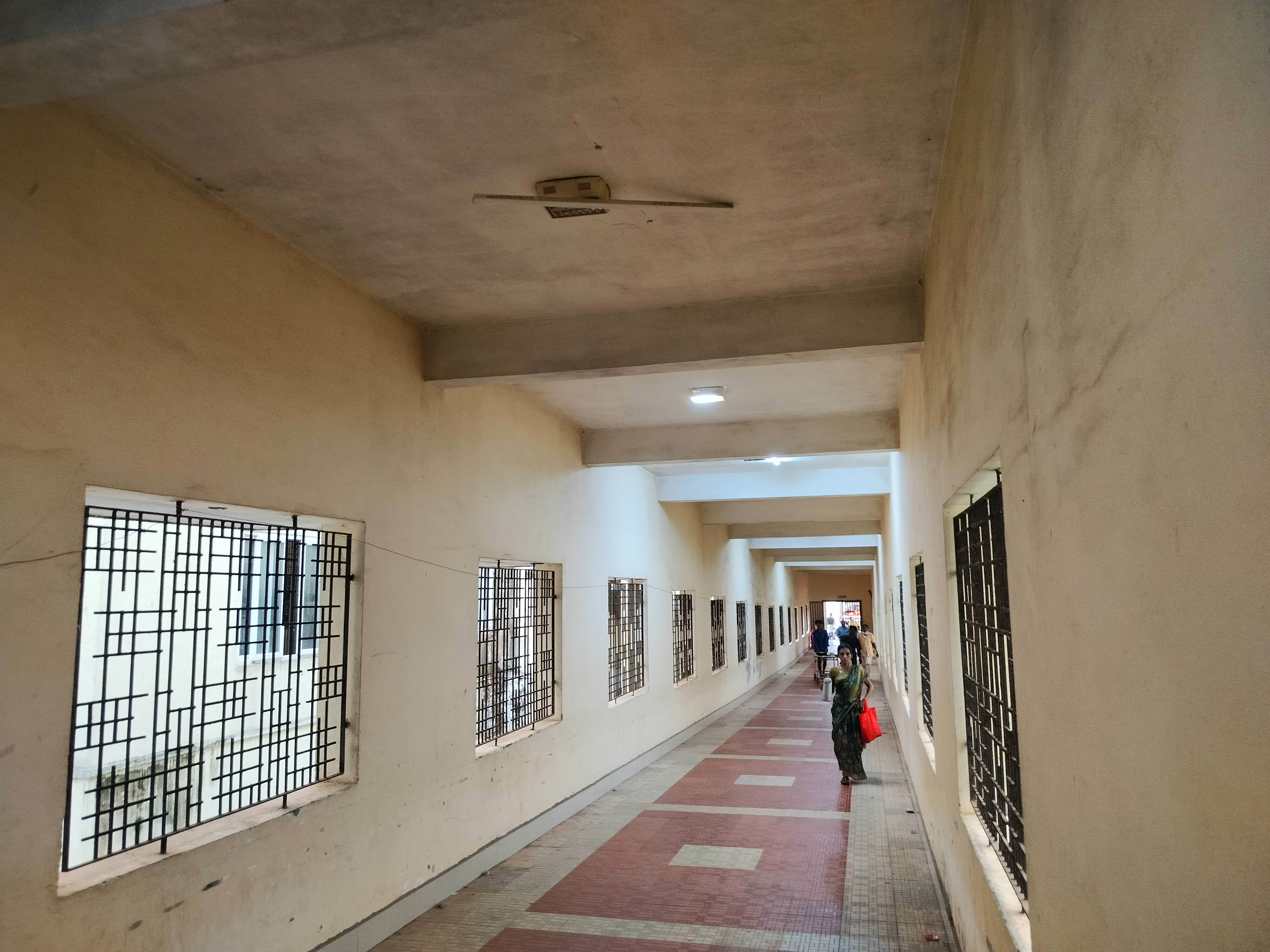
A corridor inside the hospital

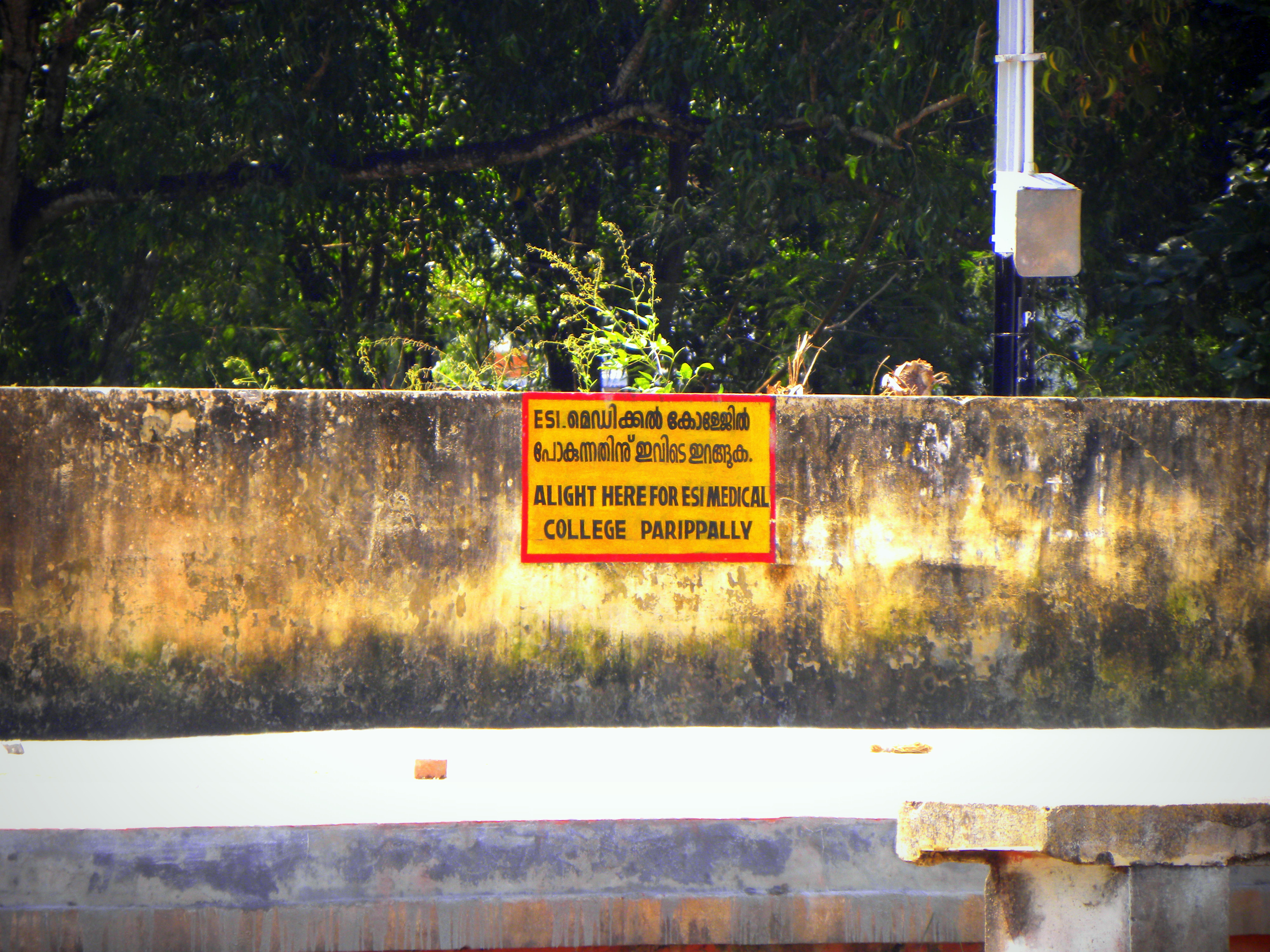
ESIC Medical College's official stoppage notification on the wall of Paravur railway station. The station is about 8 km away from the hospital

- Total plot area - 33 acres
- Total area of hospital buildings - 14,31,600 sq ft (1,33,000 m^{2})
- Total number of buildings - 28

== Courses ==
The medical college conducts MBBS course, post-graduate medical degree and a diploma in medical laboratory technology.

Course	No.of seats
MBBS	110
MD Community medicine	2
MD Forensic Medicine	2
MD Microbiology	2
MD Pathology	2
BSc Nursing	60
Diploma course in Medical Laboratory Technology (MLT) MD Medicine MS Surgery MS ENT MS Opthalmology MD Pediatrics MS OBG MS Ortho MD Anesthesiology	2 2 1 1 2 2 2 2

== Facilities ==
Facilities at Kollam Govt.Medical College Hospital
10 Modular Operation theaters	Physiotherapy
Occupational Therapy	Mortuary Complex
Medical & Non-medical Store	OP Pharmacy
Medical Record Section	Medical Counseling
Medical Library	Laundry
CSSD	Kitchen Services
Sewage Treatment Plant	Civil & Electrical Maintenance
Quarters for Doctors & other staffs	Hostel facility for students
Security Services	

== First batch of students ==
The classes for the first batch of medical students at Kollam Government medical college was started on 23 August 2017. Health Minister of Kerala, K. K. Shailaja inaugurated the function in the presence of Chathannoor MLA, G. S. Jayalal, and MP of Kollam Lok Sabha Constituency, N.K. Premachandran.

== See also ==
- Kollam
- List of hospitals in Kollam
- Government Medical College, Thiruvananthapuram
- Government T D Medical College, Alappuzha
