= Low vision assessment =

Low vision is both a subspeciality and a condition. Optometrists, Opticians, Orthoptists and Ophthalmologists after their training may undergo further training in Low vision assessment and management. There are various classifications for low vision, this varies from country to country and even from state to state. It must however be noted that the work of a low vision specialist is very important as they aid individuals with reduced vision even in the presence of conventional lenses to be able to make use of their residual vision. People benefitting from low vision assessment must be motivated to make use of the residual vision and must again be willing to use the various aids that would be prescribed.

== Classification ==
The World Health Organization classifies people with low vision as follows:

- 1. 6/18 (20/60) [0.5] to 6/60 (20/200) [1.0]
- 2. 6/60 (20/200) [1.0] to 3/60 (20/400) [1.3]
- 3. 3/60 (20/400) [1.3] to 1/60 (20/1200) [1.8]

readings from left to right are in metres, feet and LogMAR values

== Examinations ==
Low vision visual acuity examinations are done using the LogMAR chart. The advantage that this presents with is that it allows for more accurate measures of the individual's vision to be recorded. Other tests done and their significance are as follows:

- Amsler's grid test - to locate scotomas on the visual field of the individual
- Colour sensitivity test - to assess the function of the Optic nerve
- Contrast sensitivity test - to assess the function of rods photoreceptors
- Visual field test - to know the extent of the individual's field that is sensitive
- Near visual acuity - to assess the reading ability at near
