= Department of Ayush (Kerala) =

Kerala state government department for alternative medicine systems

Department of Ayurveda, Yoga & Naturopathy, Unani, Siddha and Homeopathy (AYUSH)

Department overview
- Jurisdiction: Kerala, India
- Headquarters: Government Secretariat, Thiruvananthapuram, Kerala, India
- Minister responsible: K. Muraleedharan, Minister for Health and Family Welfare, AYUSH
- Department executive: Dr.Rajan N Khobragade IAS, Additional Chief Secretary to Government (AYUSH)
- Child agencies: Directorate of Indian Systems of Medicine (ISM); Directorate of Homeopathy; Directorate of Ayurvedic Medical Education; Directorate of Homeopathic Medical Education; National AYUSH Mission, Kerala
- Website: health.kerala.gov.in

The Department of Ayurveda, Yoga & Naturopathy, Unani, Siddha and Homeopathy (AYUSH) is a department under the Government of Kerala that formulates policies, administers government institutions, and coordinates programmes related to traditional and alternative systems of medicine in Kerala. The department promotes Ayurveda, Yoga and Naturopathy, Unani, Siddha, and Homeopathy and regulates educational, research, and healthcare activities in the AYUSH sector across the state.

The department functions through directorates and autonomous bodies that manage hospitals, research institutions, medical colleges, and wellness programmes.

The ministry has been accused of promoting pseudoscience and has faced significant criticism for funding systems that lack biological plausibility and are either untested or conclusively proven as ineffective. Quality of research has been poor, and drugs have been launched without rigorous pharmacological studies and meaningful clinical trials on ayurveda or other alternative healthcare systems.

== Leadership ==
The Department of AYUSH is administratively under the Cabinet Minister for Health and Family Welfare. The current minister is K. Muraleedharan.

The department is headed by a Principal Secretary to Government, an IAS officer, supported by Additional Secretaries, Deputy Secretaries, Under Secretaries and other officials posted in the Secretariat.

== Functions ==
- Promotion and development of Ayurveda, Homeopathy, Unani, Siddha, Yoga and Naturopathy.
- Administration of government AYUSH hospitals, dispensaries, and medical education institutions.
- Implementation of national and state AYUSH health programmes.
- Promotion of AYUSH-based preventive health and lifestyle medicine.
- Coordination of research, clinical trials, and medicinal plant development initiatives.

== Directorates ==
The operational wings of the department include:

- Directorate of Homeopathy
- Directorate of Indian Systems of Medicines (ISM)
- Directorate of Homeopathic Medical Education (DHME)
- National Ayush Mission, Kerala

== Organisations ==
The following is the table of organisations under administrative control of Ayush department.

Organisation	Website
Ayurveda Drugs Control, Kerala	dcayur.kerala.gov.in
State Medicinal Plants Board, Kerala	www.smpbkerala.in
Kerala State Homoeopathic Co-operative Pharmacy Ltd. (HOMCO)	homcokerala.com
The Pharmaceutical Corporation (Oushadhi)	www.oushadhi.org

== Subordinate Institutions ==
=== Directorates / Field Departments ===
- Directorate of Homeopathy
- Directorate of Indian Systems of Medicine (ISM)
- Directorate of Ayurveda Medical Education (DAME)
- Directorate of Homeopathic Medical Education (DHME)
- National Ayush Mission (Kerala)

=== Autonomous Bodies & Missions ===
- National AYUSH Mission (Kerala)
- Kerala State Ayurveda Co-operative Federation (The Arya Vaidya Pharmacy Co-op)
- Kerala Medicinal Plants Board

=== Major Institutions ===
- Government Ayurveda Medical College, Thiruvananthapuram
- Government Ayurveda Medical College, Kannur
- Government Homoeopathic Medical Colleges in Kerala

== See also ==
- List of government hospitals in Kerala
- Department of Health and Family Welfare (Kerala)
- Ministry of Ayush, Government of India
