= Auxiliary nurse midwife =

Village-level female health worker in India

Auxiliary nurse midwife or nurse hybrids commonly known as ANM, is a village-level female health worker in India who is known as the first contact person between the community and the official health services. ANMs are regarded as the grass-roots workers in the public health organisation pyramid. Their services are considered important to provide safe and effective care to village communities. The role may help communities achieve the targets of national health programmes.

== Background ==
In 1973, the Kartar Singh Committee of the Government of India combined the functions of the health services and changed the role of ANMs. The committee recommended that there should be 1 ANM available per 10,000-12,000 people.

In 1975, the Srivastava Committee recommended expansion in the role of ANM. Recommended expansion included the role of an ANM as a multipurpose health worker. Along with maternity care, the committee recommended that the ANM's work include child health (immunization) and primary curative care of villagers. The Indian Nursing Council (INC) accepted the recommendations of the committee and included them in the syllabus in 1977. This decision also reduced the training period of the ANM from 24 months to 18 months.

In 1986, the National Education Policy gave the ANM programme a status of Vocational Education. Following this decision, the INC again reviewed its policy and recommended that the Ministry of Health and Family Welfare make the ANM course vocational at +2 level (after 10th class/higher secondary level). However, only a few states of India have made the ANM course a vocational course at the higher secondary level of schooling. According to the latest guidelines by INC, the minimum age for admission to an ANM course should be 17 years while the maximum age limit is 35 years.

In 2005, the National Rural Health Mission (NRHM) was launched, which focused on improvising primary health care in villages and further increased the importance of the ANM as a link between health services and the community.

== Role of the ANM ==
As per the Rural Health Statistics Bulletin of 2010, there were 147,069 sub-centres functioning in India, which were increased to 152,326 in March 2014. As per recent norms, there should be one sub-centre for population of 5,000 while in tribal and hilly area population allotted for each sub-centre is 3,000.

Under NRHM, each sub-centre gets an untied fund of Rs 10,000 for expenditure. The ANM has a joint bank account with the Sarpanch (head) of the village to get such funds. ANMs use untied fund for buying items needed for sub-centre, such as blood pressure equipment, weighing machine, scales and for cleaning. The rate of deliveries at the sub-centre level has been increased since the grant of untied funds via NRHM.

ANMs are expected to be multi-purpose health workers. ANM-related work includes maternal and child health along with family planning services, health and nutrition education, efforts for maintaining environmental sanitation, immunisation for the control of communicable diseases, treatment of minor injuries, and first aid in emergencies and disasters.

In remote areas, such as hilly and tribal areas where transport facility is likely to be poor, ANMs are required to conduct home deliveries for women.

=== Relationship with ASHA ===
With the Anganwadi Worker (AWW), the ANM acts as a resource person for the training of ASHAs. The ANM motivates ASHAs to bring beneficiaries to the institution. The ASHA brings pregnant women to the ANM for check-ups. She also brings married couples to the ANM for counseling on the family planning. The ASHA brings children to immunisation sessions held by the ANM. The ASHA act as bridge between the ANM and the village.

== Bibliography ==
- Hilda Elizabeth Lehman (1988). Auxiliary Nurse Midwife/female Health Worker Students in India: Self-efficacy in Role Function Relative to Child Survival and Beliefs about Grassroot Development. Teachers College, Columbia University.
