= Anjarakkandy =

Anjarakandy Ancharakandy
- Census Town
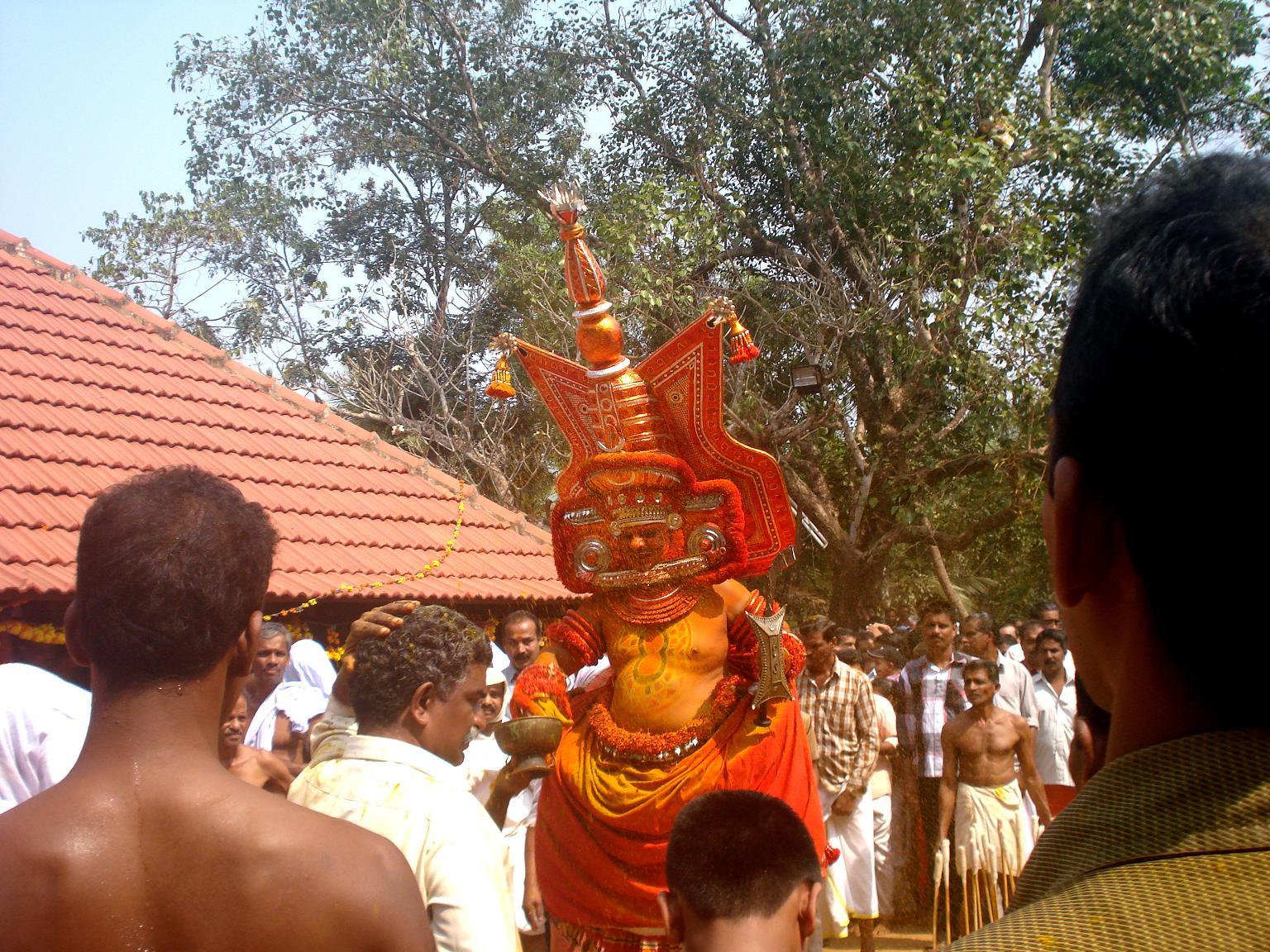
- Theyyam at Anjarakkandy
- Nickname: Thrissur
- Location in Kerala, India Anjarakandy (India)
- Coordinates: 11°52′56″N 75°30′35″E
- Country: India
- State: Kerala
- District: Kannur

Government
  - Type: Panchayati raj (India)
  - Body: Anjarakkandy Grama Panchayat

Area
  - Total: 15.45 km^{2} (5.97 sq mi)

Population
  - Total: 23,030
  - Density: 1,491/km^{2} (3,861/sq mi)

Languages
  - Official: Malayalam, English
- Time zone: UTC+5:30 (IST)
- PIN: 670612
- ISO 3166 code: IN-KL
- Vehicle registration: KL-13(old), KL-58

Anjarakandy is a census town and grama panchayat in Kannur district of Kerala, India. Anjarakandi River flows through Anjarakandy town.

== History ==
The village includes Anjarakandy Cinnamon Estate, established by the East India Company in 1767. The estate, reputed to be Asia's largest, and the associated processing plant are still operational. Visitors are permitted to view the process of preparing cinnamon spice and extraction of oil. The local king, Pazhassi Raja and the British East India Company waged war for control of the estate.

Lord Brown of the East India Company started a system of keeping a record of land transactions done by him to open Anjarakandy Cinnamon Estate. This triggered the opening of a new Department of Land Registration. The Land Registrar's office was built in 1767.

== Demographics ==
As of the 2011 Census of India, Ancharakandy had a population of 23,030 which constitutes 10,646 (46.2%) males and 12,384 (53.8%) females. Ancharakandy census town spreads over an area of 15.45 km^{2} with 5,245 families residing in it. The male female sex ratio was 1.163, higher than state average of 1.084. In Ancharakandy, 10.3% of the population is under 6 years age. Ancharakandy had an overall literacy of 97.3% higher than state average of 94%. The male literacy stands at 98.5% and female literacy was 96.3%.

== Religion ==
As of 2011 census, Ancharakandy census town had total population of 23,030 among which 82.75% are Hindus, 16.8% are Muslims and 0.45% others.

== Administration ==
Anjarakandy Grama Panchayat is divided into 17 wards where elections are held for every five years. The panchayat is part of Thalassery block panchayat and Thalassery taluk. It falls under Dharmadam Assembly constituency and Kannur Lok Sabha constituency. As per the 2025 Kerala local elections, the panchayat is currently ruled by LDF, who won 11 out of the 17 wards.

=== Ward list ===
Anjarakandy panchayat comprises of the following 17 wards.

Ward no.	Name	Ward no.	Name
1	Muzhappala	2	Narickode
3	Parambukkari	4	Kannadivelicham
5	Aalakkal	6	Muringeri
7	Kuzhimbalode	8	Ekkal
9	Kameth	10	Palayam
11	Paleri	12	Kavinmoola
13	Odathilpeedika	14	Uchulikkunnu
15	Nalaam Peedika	16	Chakkarakkal
17	Aanenimetta		

== Healthcare ==
The Kannur Medical College, Anjarakandy established in 2006, a private self-financing medical college is equipped with a 500-bed super-speciality hospital. The campus also includes a nursing college, Kannur dental college and Malabar Institute of Technology established in 2010. The panchayat is also served by the government family health centre in Anjarakandy.

During the COVID-19 pandemic, the Kannur Medical College at Anjarakandy was converted into the designated COVID-19 treatment centre for Kannur district.

== Educational institutions ==
- Malabar Institute of Technology
- Kannur Medical College, Anjarakandy

== Transportation ==
A national highway passes through Kannur city. Mangalore, Goa and Mumbai can be accessed on the northern side and Cochin and Thiruvananthapuram can be accessed on the southern side. The major roads passing through Anjarakandi town are Thazhe Chovva-Mattannur road which connects Kannur city and Mattannur town and Kannur International Airport, and Thalassery-Irikkur road which connects to cities of Mysore and Bangalore. The nearest railway station is Thalassery on Mangalore-Palakkad line. Trains are available to almost all parts of India subject to advance booking over the internet. There are airports at Kannur International Airport at Mattannur, 9 km (5.6 mi) from Anjarakkandy town, Mangalore and Calicut.
