= Nursing in India =

Nursing in India is the practice of providing care for patients, families, and communities in that nation to improve health and quality of life.

== History ==
There is evidence of institutionalised hospitals and nursing in India going back to the 5th century BC.

=== Florence Nightingale ===
Florence Nightingale had a significant influence on nursing in India and had a close knowledge of Indian conditions, especially in the army. She was interested in the nursing service for the civilian population, though her first interest was the welfare of the army in India.

In 1854 (in the Crimean war), when women nurses were considered as rare, Florence Nightingale shows her ability in nursing. Works of Florence results in formation of Royal Commission. Army Medical School was established in year 1857. She established "Nightingale School for nurses". In 1907, she gained "The Order of Merit" by the King.

=== 19th century ===
In 1871, the first school of nursing was started in Government General Hospital, Madras with a six-month diploma midwives programme with four students. The first nursing school for women was started at Kanpur's Saint Catherine's Hospital by Dr Alice Marval.

Four female superintendents and four trained nurses from England were posted to Madras. Between 1890 and 1900, many schools, under either missions or government, were started in various parts of India. In the 20th century, national nursing associations were started.

In 1897, B. C. Roy worked to the standards of nursing and nurses of both Genders.

== Qualifications ==
The Indian Nursing Council recognizes several levels of nurses:

- Auxiliary Nursing & Midwife (ANM): Completion of 10+2 in any stream, followed by 2 years of ANM training.
- General Nursing & Midwifery (GNM): Completion of 10+2 in any stream, followed by 3 years of GNM training.
- Bachelor of Science in Nursing (B.Sc. Nursing): Completion of 10+2 in the science stream (Physics, Chemistry, and Biology), followed by 4 years of nursing education.
- Post Basic B.Sc. Nursing: Completion of GNM or equivalent, followed by 2 years of additional training..
- Master of Science in Nursing (M.Sc. Nursing): A degree in B.Sc. Nursing or Post Basic B.Sc. Nursing, plus one year of work experience, followed by 2 years of postgraduate training.
