= Kerala University of Health Sciences =

State university located in Thrissur, Kerala, India

- Motto: Sarve Bhavantu Sukhinah (Sanskrit)
- Motto in English: May All be Happy
- Type: Public Medical University
- Established: 2010; 16 years ago
- Affiliations: UGC, NMC
- Chancellor: Governor of Kerala
- Vice-Chancellor: Mohanan Kunnummal
- Pro-Chancellor: K. Muraleedharan, (Minister for Health and Medical Education)
- Location: Thrissur, Kerala, India; 10.5232°N 76.2171°E
- Campus: Rural
- Website: kuhs.ac.in

Kerala University of Health Sciences (KUHS) is a state university located in Thrissur, Kerala, India. It was established by the Kerala University of Health Sciences Act 2010, for ensuring proper and systematic instruction, teaching, training, and research and also to have uniformity in the various academic programmes in medical and allied subjects in the State of Kerala. The University is mandated to affiliate all Colleges and Institutions in Kerala, imparting professional education in health care. So far around 382 professional colleges have been affiliated to the University. The Governor of Kerala serves as the University Chancellor, and the Minister for Health and Family Welfare serves as the Pro-Chancellor of the university.

== History ==
KUHS was established in 2010 through an ordinance and later Kerala University of Health Sciences Act, 2010. All branches of treatment came under the university and medical and para-medical colleges previously functioning under different Universities, like University of Kerala, Mahatma Gandhi University, Calicut University, Kannur University, Cochin University of Science and Technology, and Sree Sankaracharya University of Sanskrit, also came under this university. The territorial jurisdiction of the university extends to the whole of the State of Kerala.

The university affiliates institutions across nine disciplines: medicine, dentistry, nursing, pharmacy, Ayurveda, homoeopathy, Siddha, Unani and allied health sciences. By the mid-2020s it had about 382 affiliated institutions, with nursing, allied health sciences and pharmacy accounting for the largest numbers, and it enrolled more than 100,000 students a year.

== Administration ==
The vice-chancellor is the academic and executive head of the university and is appointed by the Chancellor, the Governor of Kerala. Mohanan Kunnummal was reappointed vice-chancellor in October 2024 for a term of five years or until he reached the age of 70.

== Affiliated colleges ==
Affiliated colleges are categorised into two: Autonomous colleges and Non-Autonomous colleges. Autonomous colleges are bestowed academic independence, primarily in order to enhance the level of education in those colleges.

A college may be classified as government-run, private unaided, or private aided. A government college receives full funding from the Government of Kerala, while a private unaided college receives no funding from the government. In a private aided college, one or more of its courses receives partial funding from the government.

=== Table legend ===
Key:

- ‡ Some of the listed subjects may not be offered by all colleges
- ₴ Some colleges offer either DM or MCh and some both.
- ‡‡ Some courses may be offered by a single college only.

Name in table	Course	Type	Subjects Offered For Specialisation ‡
MBBS	Bachelor of Medicine, Bachelor of Surgery	Baccalaureate	None
PDM	Diploma	Postgraduate diploma	Anaesthesiology, Clinical Pathology, Dermatology and Venerology, Obstetrics and Gynaecology, Ophthalmology, Orthopaedics, Oto-Rhino Laryngology, Child Health, Physical Medicine and Rehabilitation, Psychological Medicine, Public Health, Radiodiagnosis, Medical Radiotherapy, TB and Chest Diseases
MS	Master of Surgery	Master's degree	General Surgery, Oto-Rhino Laryngology, Ophthalmology, Orthopaedics, Obstetrics and Gynaecology
MD	Master of Medicine	Master's degree	Anaesthesiology, Anatomy, Biochemistry, Community Medicine, Dermatology Venerology and Leprosy, General Medicine, Microbiology, Paediatrics, Pharmacology, Physical Medicine & Rehabilitation, Psychiatry, Radiodiagnosis, Radiotherapy, Respiratory Medicine, Transfusion medicine & Immunohaematology
DM	Doctor of Medicine or M.Ch ₴	Doctoral degree	Cardiology, Medical Gastro-enterology, Nephrology, Neurology, Pulmonology
BDS	Bachelor of Dental Surgery	Baccalaureate	None
MDS	Master of Dental Surgery	Master's degree	Conservative Dentistry and Endodontics, Prosthodontics and Crown & Bridge, Periodontology, Oral and Maxillofacial Surgery, Orthodontics and Dentofacial Orthopedics, Oral Pathology and Microbiology, Pedodontics and Preventive Dentistry, Oral Medicine and Radiology, Public HealthDentistry
BAMS	Bachelor of Ayurvedic Medicine and Surgery	Baccalaureate	None
BNA	B.Sc Nursing in Ayurvedic Medicine	Baccalaureate	None
BPA	Bachelor of Pharmacy in Ayurvedic Medicine	Baccalaureate	None
BHMS	Bachelor of Homeopathic Medicine and Surgery	Baccalaureate	None
MDH	Doctor of Medicine in Homoeopathy	Master's degree	Materia Medica, Homoeopathic Philosophy, Repertory
BPharm	Bachelor of Pharmacy	Baccalaureate	None
MPharm	Master of Pharmacy	Master's degree	Pharmaceutical Analysis, Pharmaceutical Chemistry, Pharmacognosy and Phytochemistry, Pharmaceutics, Pharmacology, Pharmacy practice
Pharm D	Doctor of pharmacy (Post BPharm)	Doctoral degree	None
Pharm D	Doctor of pharmacy	Doctoral degree	None
BSN	B.Sc Nursing	Baccalaureate	None
PBSN	PostB.Sc Nursing	Postgraduate education	None
MSN	Master of Science in Nursing	Master's degree	Medical Surgical Nursing (Includes Sub specialties), Obstetrics and Gynaecological Nursing, Child Health (Paediatric) Nursing, Mental Health (Psychiatric) Nursing, Community Health Nursing
BASLP	Bachelor of Audiology and Speech language pathology	Baccalaureate	None
BPT	Bachelor of Physiotherapy	Baccalaureate	None
BSO	B.Scin Optometry	Baccalaureate	None
BSc MLT	B.Scin Medical laboratory technology	Baccalaureate	None
BCVT	Bachelor Degree in Cardiovascular Technology	Baccalaureate	None
MPT	Master of Science in Physiotherapy	Master's degree	Musculo-skeletal and Sports, Physiotherapy in Neurology, Physiotherapy in Cardio - Respiratory, Physiotherapy in Pediatrics
MASLP	Master of Audiology and Speech language pathology	Master's degree	None
MSMP	Master of Science in Medical Physiology	Master's degree	None
MHA	Master of hospital administration	Master's degree	None
Others‡‡			

The list is further categorised into private, Government aided, and Government colleges.

=== Non-autonomous colleges ===
==== Government College ====
College Name	BCVT	BDS	BPharm	BSMLT	BSN	BSO	DM	MBBS	MD	MDS	MPharm	MS	MSMP	MSN	PBSN	PDM	Others
GMC, Thiruvananthapuram	No	No	Yes	Yes	Yes	Yes	Yes	Yes	Yes	No	Yes	Yes	Yes	Yes	Yes	Yes	M.Phil in Clinical Epidemiology and MSc MLT
GMC, Ernakulam	No	<!															
GMC, Thrissur	Yes	No	No	Yes	Yes	No	No	Yes	Yes	No	No	Yes	No	No	No	Yes	No
GDC, Thiruvananthapuram	No	Yes	No	No	No	No	No	No	No	Yes	No	No	No	No	No	No	No
GMC, Kottayam	No	No	No	No	No	No	Yes	Yes	Yes	No	No	Yes	No	No	No	Yes	No
GDC, Kottayam	No	Yes	No	No	No	No	No	No	No	Yes	No	No	No	No	No	No	No
GCN, Kottayam	No	No	No	No	Yes	No	No	No	No	No	No	No	No	Yes	No	No	No
GMC Kozhikode, Calicut	No	No	Yes	No	Yes	No	Yes	Yes	Yes	No	Yes	Yes	No	Yes	No	Yes	Diploma in Pharmacy; DMLT; DRT; DOA
GMC Kollam	No	No	No	No	No	No	No	Yes	No	No	No	No	No	No	No	No	No
GDC, Calicut	No	Yes	No	No	No	No	No	No	No	Yes	No	No	No	No	No	No	No
TDMC, Allapuzha	No	No	No	No	No	No	No	Yes	Yes	No	No	Yes	No	No	No	Yes	No

==== Private Colleges ====
College Name	District
Azeezia College of Dental Sciences & Research	Kollam
Devaki Amma Memorial College of Pharmacy	Malappuram
Dr. Moopen’s Medical College	Wayanad
Jamia Salafiya Pharmacy College	Malappuram
Jubilee Mission Medical College & Research Institute	Thrissur
K.V.M. College of Pharmacy	Alappuzha
Little Flower College of Nursing	Eranakulam
Malabar Medical College	Kozhikode
Malik Deenar College of Pharmacy	Kasaragod
Mar Thoma College of Special Education	Kasaragod
M.E.S Medical College	Malappuram
MIMS College of Nursing	Malappuram
Malankara Orthodox Syrian Church Medical College	Ernakulam
Moulana college of nursing and Paramedical sciences	Malappuram
Mount zion medical college	Pathanamthitta
National College of Pharmacy	Kozhikode
Pushapagiri College of Dental Sciences	Pathinamthitta
Pushapagiri College of Pharmacy	Pathinamthitta
Pushapagiri College of Nursing	Pathinamthitta
Pushapagiri Medical College Hospital	Pathinamthitta
SP Fort College of Medical College	Thiruvananthapuram
Sree Gokulam Medical College	Thiruvananthapuram
Sree Narayana Institute of Medical sciences	Ernakulam
Sree Uthradom Thirunal Academy of Medical Sciences	Thiruvananthapuram
St. Joseph's College of Pharmacy	Alappuzha
K.T.N College of Pharmacy	Palakkad
