= List of research institutes and centres in Kerala =

The following is a list of research institutes and centres in Kerala.

== Kasaragod ==
Government funded

- ICAR-Central Plantation Crops Research Institute
- Central University of Kerala

== Kannur ==
Government funded

- Kannur University
- Pepper Research Station, Panniyur (Kerala Agricultural University)
- Malabar Cancer Centre, Thalassery (MCC)

== Wayanad ==
Others

- M. S. Swaminathan Research Foundation, Community Agrobiodiversity Centre, Meppadi

●Science Technology Education and Research center (STERC), Science Center, Meenangadi.

Kerala Veterinary and Animal Sciences University

== Kozhikode ==
Government funded

- ICAR-Central Marine Fisheries Research Institute, Calicut Research Centre, West Hill P.O, Kozhikode
- ICAR- Indian Institute of Spices Research (IISR), Vellimadukunnu, Kozhikode
- Zoological Survey of India (ZSI), Western Ghat Research Center (WGRC) Calicut
- KSCSTE- Centre for Water Resources Development and Management (CWRDM)
- KSCSTE- Kerala School of Mathematics (KSoM), Kunnamangalam, Kerala
- KSCSTE- The Malabar Botanical Garden and Institute for Plant Sciences (MBGIPS)
- Indian Institute of Management Kozhikode, Kunnamangalam, Kerala
- National Institute of Technology Calicut (NITC)
- Government Medical College, Kozhikode
- The Multidisciplinary Research Unit (MRU), Govt Medical College, Kozhikode
- Institute of Mental Health and Neuroscience, Kozhikode
- ULRC, ULCCS Research Centre, UL CyberPark, Kozhikode

== Malappuram ==
Government funded

- University of Calicut, Thenjipalam
- KSCSTE- Kerala Forest Research Institute (KFRI), Sub center, Nilambur

== Palakkad ==
Government funded

- Indian Institute of Technology, Palakkad (IIT-P), Kanjikode
- Institute of Integrative Medical Sciences (Government Medical College, Palakkad)

Others

- IRTC - Integrated Rural Technology Centre, Mundur

== Thrissur ==
Government funded

- Kerala Veterinary and Animal Sciences University (KVASU), Mannuthy
- KSCSTE- Kerala Forest Research Institute (KFRI), Peechi
- Kerala Kalamandalam, Cheruthuruthy

== Ernakulam ==
Government funded

- Cochin University of Science and Technology(CUSAT), Cochin(Kochi)

Others

- TIBR Biotech Private Limited, Kalamassery, Kochi

== Kottayam ==
Government funded

- Mahatma Gandhi University
- Centre for Mathematical and Statistical Sciences, Pala
- Indian Institute of Information Technology Kottayam

== Alapuzha ==
Government funded

- National Institute of Virology (NIV) Kerala unit, Alappuzha

== Pathanamthitta ==
Others

- Association for Social Change Evolution and Transformation (ASCENT), Elavumthitta, Pathanamthitta

== Kollam ==
Government funded

- Corporate Research Centre, Indian Rare Earths Ltd

== Thiruvananthapuram ==
Government funded

- University of Kerala, Thiruvananthapuram
- APJ Abdul Kalam Technological University
- ISRO - The Vikram Sarabhai Space Centre (VSSC), Kochuveli
- ISRO - Liquid Propulsion Systems Centre (LPSC), Valiamala
- ISRO - Inertial Systems Unit (IISU), Vattiyoorkavu
- IAV- Institute of Advanced Virology, Bio 360 lifescience park, Thonakkal, Thiruvananthapuram
- Indian Institute of Space Science and Technology (IIST), Valiamala
- CSIR- National Institute for Interdisciplinary Science and Technology, Pappanamcode
- Indian Institute of Science Education and Research, Thiruvananthapuram
- Rajiv Gandhi Centre for Biotechnology, Poojapurra, Akkulam
- National Centre for Earth Science Studies, Akkulam
- Sree Chitra Tirunal Institute for Medical Sciences & Technology, Medical College and Poojapurra
- Biomedical Technology Wing, Sree Chitra Tirunal Institute for Medical Sciences & Technology, Poojapurra
- Achuta Menon Center for Health Science Studies, Sree Chitra Tirunal Institute for Medical Sciences & Technology, Medical College
- Regional Cancer Centre, Thiruvananthapuram, Medical College
- Government Medical College, Thiruvananthapuram
- Multidisciplinary Research Unit (MRU), Govt. Medical College, Thiruvananthapuram
- National Institute of Speech and Hearing, Akkulam
- KSCSTE-Jawaharlal Nehru Tropical Botanic Garden and Research Institute (KSCSTE - JNTBGRI), Palode
- KSCSTE- Institute of Advanced Virology (IAV), Kerala, Thonnakkal
- KSCSTE - National Transportation Planning and Research Centre (NATPAC)
- ICAR - Central Tuber Crops Research Institute, Sreekariyam
- Centre for Development Studies, Ulloor
- The Centre for Development of Advanced Computing,(C-DAC), Vellayamabalam
- Indian Institute of Information Technology and Management, Kerala, Technopark
- Centre for Mathematical and Statistical Sciences, Trivandrum campus
- College of Engineering, Trivandrum (APJ Abdul Kalam Technological University)
