= List of botanical gardens in India =

A botanical garden is a place where plants, especially ferns, conifers and flowering plants, are grown and displayed for the purposes of research and education. This distinguishes them from parks and pleasure gardens where plants, usually with beautiful flowers, are grown for public amenity Botanical gardens that specialize in trees are sometimes referred to as arboreta. They are occasionally associated with zoos. The Acharya Jagadish Chandra Bose Botanical Garden in West Bengal is the first of its kind in the South Asia.

== List of botanical parks ==
Serial No.	Name	State	Details
1	Padmapuram gardens, Araku	Andhra Pradesh	
2	Assam State Zoo-cum-Botanical Garden, Guwahati	Assam	
3	Ekamra Kanan Botanical Gardens, Bhubaneswar	Odisha	
4	Sanjay Gandhi Jaivik Udyan, Patna	Bihar	
5	Hyderabad Botanical Garden	Telangana	
6	NTR Garden, Hyderabad	Telangana	
7	Panjab University Botanical Garden	Chandigarh	
8	Jijamata Udyaan, Mumbai	Maharashtra	
9	Pilikula Botanical Garden, Mangaluru	Karnataka	
10	Regional Museum of Natural History Mysore, Mysuru	Karnataka	
11	Jawaharlal Nehru Tropical Botanic Garden and Research Institute, Thiruvananthapuram	Kerala	Biggest in India and conserves the largest number of plant species in Asia
12	Malabar Botanical Garden and Institute for Plant Sciences, Kozhikode	Kerala	Largest collection of aquatic plant species in India
13	Government Botanical Gardens, Ooty, Nilgiris district	Tamil Nadu	
14	Semmozhi Poonga, Chennai	Tamil Nadu	
15	Madhavaram Botanical Garden, Chennai	Tamil Nadu	Largest botanical garden in Chennai
16	Aligarh Fort, Aligarh	Uttar Pradesh	Maintained by the Department of Botany, AMU
17	Acharya Jagadish Chandra Bose Indian Botanic Garden, Howrah	West Bengal	Home to The Great Banyan, an enormous banyan tree (Ficus benghalensis) that is reckoned to be the largest tree in the world, at more than 330 metres in circumference
18	Agri Horticultural Society of India, Kolkata	West Bengal	
19	Lloyd's Botanical Garden, Darjeeling	West Bengal	
20	Narendra Narayan Park, Cooch Behar	West Bengal	
21	Lalbagh, Bengaluru	Karnataka	
22	Malampuzha Garden, Palakkad	Kerala	
23	Mysore Zoo, Mysuru	Karnataka	
24	National Cactus and Succulent Botanical Garden and Research Centre, Panchkula	Haryana	One of the largest Cactus and Succulent Botanical Gardens in India
25	Anandbag Botanical Garden	Darbhanga	
26	Botanic Garden of Indian Republic, Noida	Delhi NCR	
27	Kohima Botanical Garden, Kohima	Nagaland	
28	Andhra University Botanical Garden (AUBG), Visakhapatnam	Andhra Pradesh	Center for Conservation of Endemic & Threatened Plants

== See also ==
- Arid Forest Research Institute
- Indian Council of Forestry Research and Education
- List of botanical gardens
- Ministry of Environment and Forests (India)
