= N. Balakrishnan Nair =

Indian marine biologist, ecologist (1927–2010)

- Born: 6 July 1927; Kerala, India
- Died: 21 April 2010 (aged 82); Vazhuthacaud, Kerala, India
- Education: University of Madras
- Known for: Aquatic Biology; Biodeterioration of cellulose
- Awards: 1971 Shanti Swarup Bhatnagar Prize; 1980 All India Congress of Zoology Gold Medal; 1984 Padma Shri; 1988 INSA Chandrakala Hora Memorial Medal
- Scientific career
- Fields: Marine biology
- Workplaces: University of Kerala; Kerala State Council for Science, Technology and Environment; Kerala State Coastal Zone Management Authority; Council of Scientific and Industrial Research

Narayana Balakrishnan Nair (1927–2010) was a marine biologist, ecologist and the founder president of Kerala Science Congress. He was known for his advocacy of trawling ban during monsoon seasons which was later accepted and imposed by the Government of Kerala. A Jawaharlal Nehru fellow, Nair was an elected fellow of all the major Indian science academies as well as the Zoological Society of London. The Council of Scientific and Industrial Research, the apex agency of the Government of India for scientific research, awarded him the Shanti Swarup Bhatnagar Prize for Science and Technology, one of the highest Indian science awards, in 1971, for his contributions to biological sciences. He received the fourth highest Indian civilian honor of the Padma Shri in 1984.

== Biography ==
Balakrishnan Nair was born on 5 February 1927 in Perumbavoor in Ernakulam District in the South Indian state of Kerala. After obtaining a doctoral degree (PhD) from the University of Madras in 1955, he continued his researches there to secure the degree of Doctor of Science in 1965 and started his career by joining the University of Kerala as a member of the faculty of science. He held various positions at the university such as that of the head of the Department of Aquatic Biology and Fisheries (1968–80) and the dean of the faculty of science (1976) till he moved out in 1978 to take up positions elsewhere. Subsequently, he chaired the Science, Technology and Environment Committee (STEC) (present-day Kerala State Council for Science, Technology and Environment) of the state government and served as a member of the Kerala State Coastal Zone Management Authority, established by the Government of Kerala in 2002. He also served as an emeritus professor of the Council of Scientific and Industrial Research (CSIR) from 1991 onwards.

Nair was married to Gomathi and the couple had a son, B. Chandra Mohan and a daughter, G. Aparna Krishna Mohan, both medical doctors. The family lived in Vazhuthacaud, in Thiruvananthapuram and it was here he died on 21 April 2010, at the age of 82, succumbing to age-related illnesses.

== Legacy ==
Balakrishnan Nair focused his researches on organisms that damage the marine ecology and his studies on the wood-boring molluscs helped in understanding the mechanism of their timber boring activities. He studied the littoral ecology and proposed measures for conservation of aquatic life and its management. It was known that his advocacy for banning the trawling activities during the monsoon seasons in Kerala influenced the subsequent decision by the state government to impose monsoon trawling, thereby contributing in conserving the shrimp population of the Kerala coasts. His expertise on the field of biodeterioration of cellulose in aquatic environment was reported to have been acknowledged by the science community. He proposed measures for the conservation of tropical wetlands and mangroves and for the management of marine algae and seagrasses. He published his studies through over 400 articles and several books. (Note: His writings have been quoted by several authors.) A Textbook of Marine Ecology, The Biology of Woodboring Teredinid Molluscs, Marine Timber Destroying Organisms of the Andaman-Nicobar Islands and the Lakshadweep Archipelago and Advances in Aquatic Biology and Fisheries, in English language and Paristhithivignanam (Environmental Studies) and Kadal: Oru Adbhudam (Ocean: A Wonder), both in Malayalam. are some of the notable ones among them.

Nair was one of the founder members of the Kerala Science Congress when it was established in 1989 and served as its president since inception till 1992. He was the chairman of the Science, Technology and Environment Committee (STEC) (later remodeled as Kerala State Council for Science, Technology and Environment) and was a member of the Academy of Natural Sciences of Philadelphia He sat in the panel of experts of the Centre for Coastal Zone Management and Coastal Shelter Belt, with responsibility for the state of Kerala and was a founder member of the Kerala State Coastal Zone Management Authority. He chaired the Indo-Dutch Mission for the Kallada Environmental Action Programme in 1991 and served as the secretary to the Government of Kerala at the Department of Science, Technology and Environment from 1986 to 1991. He was a member of the council of the Indian National Science Academy during 1978–80 and was involved with eight science journals as a member of their editorial boards while serving as the chief editor of Aquatic Biology journal from 1980 to 1986. A life member of the Marine Biological Association of India, he participated in several conferences to deliver keynote addresses.

== Awards and honors ==
Nair was awarded the Shanti Swarup Bhatnagar Prize, one of the highest Indian science awards, by the Council of Scientific and Industrial Research in 1971. In 1979, he was selected as a National Professor by the University Grants Commission and he received the All India Congress of Zoology Gold Medal in 1980. His project on Ecology of Biodeterioration in the sea around India with special reference to Timber Destroying Organisms was chosen for the Jawaharlal Nehru Fellowship in 1982 and the Government of India included him in the Republic Day honors list for the civilian award of the Padma Shri in 1984. The Indian National Science Academy, which elected him as their fellow in 1975, awarded him the Chandrakala Hora Memorial Medal in 1987. He was also an elected fellow of the Indian Academy of Sciences, National Academy of Sciences, India, The World Academy of Sciences (2002), Zoological Society of London, Zoological Society of India, Marine Biological Association of India and was a founder fellow of the National Academy of Agricultural Sciences. Nansen Environmental Research Centre (India) have instituted an annual award, Prof. N. Balakrishnan Nair Award in his honor for recognizing excellence.

== Selected bibliography ==
- Narayana Balakrishnan Nair; M.. Saraswathy (1971). The Biology of Woodboring Teredinid Molluscs.
- Narayana Balakrishnan Nair; D. M. Thampy (1980). A textbook of marine ecology. Macmillan. ISBN 9780333903209.
- Natarajan, P; Suryanarayanan H; Balakrishnan Nair, N. (1987). Advances in Aquatic Biology and Fisheries. Prof. N Balakrishnan Nair felicitation committee. p. 437.
- N. Balakrishnan Nair (1994). Marine timber destroying organisms of the Andaman-Nicobar Islands and the Lakshadweep archipelago. The Survey. p. 87. ASIN B0006F9OSI.
- Balakrishnan Nair N. (2002). Kadal: Oru Adbhudam. The State Institute of Languages. p. 149. ISBN 81-7638-325-2.

== See also ==
- Kerala Science Congress
- Kerala State Council for Science, Technology and Environment
- List of people from Kerala
