= Moinak Banerjee =

Genetics researcher

- Scientific career
- Institutions: All India Institute of Medical Sciences, New Delhi. The Centre for Cellular & Molecular Biology (CCMB), Hyderabad

Moinak Banerjee is an Indian researcher, who is presently working as a scientist at Human Molecular Genetics laboratory of Neurobiology division in Rajiv Gandhi Centre for Biotechnology, Thiruvananthapuram, Kerala. He had been the President of Indian society of Human Genetics and also been the Vice President of Association of DNA Fingerprinting and Associated Technologies. His main area of research involves deciphering molecular pathogenesis of neuropsychiatric disorders employing genetics, pharmacogenetics, immunogenetics and epigenetics approaches. His research group was the pioneer in addressing the genetic structure of Kerala population. Human leukocyte antigen (HLA) A, B and C allelic diversity based studies from his lab showed that Dravidian tribal communities were distinct from the other ethnic populations globally. He also postulated a crypto‐Dravidian origin of non-tribal communities of Kerala, as there were traces of genetic admixture with the Mediterranean, western European, central Asian and East Asian populations. Population genetic studies were carried out using non-functional markers, such as microsatellite markers, and functional markers like immunogenetic markers (HLA, Cytokines), Pharmacogenomic genes (drug target, drug metabolism and drug transporter genes) and epigenetic genes. Some of his work has been translated in regional languages to reach wider audience by other authors [5,6,7]. He strongly supports the opinion that population genetics forms the foundation for disease genetic studies.

His population genetic work laid the foundation for his work on complex neurological, neuropsychiatric and developmental disorders. Many of these developmental disorders are conventionally known to be purely genetic in nature while he demonstrates that many of these congenital malformations can also be drug induced. He preaches that before indulging in complex disease genetics one should first understand and prioritise issues of genetic stratification, phenotypic stratification and epigenetic stratification. Many of the complex disease he investigates has a strong environmental influence but he recommends that the threshold of environment influence is determined by the genetics of ones epigenome and immunogenome [8,9]. He has been involved in investigating the genetic, immunogenetics, pharmacogenetics, and epigenetics of complex diseases such as Epilepsy, Schizophrenia, Autism, Cerebral stroke (Aneurysm), Dementia, Suicide, Cancer, Parkinsons, Congenital heart abnormalities, Hearing loss and paediatric rare conditions. He also uses In-Silico, metabolomic and metagenomic approach in his investigations.

He was one of the earliest to develop Linkage Disequilibrium Map of tribal populations of Kerala and Tamil Nadu. He had also been one of the earliest to use the ayurgenomic approach to understand Prakritis. He was involved in establishing the role of genetics in symptomatology of Schizophrenia and the role of chronic exposure to altered immune response in development of Schizophrenia. He had been passionate about drug resistance in schizophrenia and epilepsy and this led him to pharmacogenomic and pharmacoepigenomics investigations.
