= Kerala school =

Kerala school may refer to:

- Kerala School Kalolsavam, an annual art competition for students in Kerala
- Kerala school of astronomy and mathematics, in Kerala between the 14th and 16th centuries CE
- Kerala School of Mathematics, Kozhikode, in Kunnamangalam near Kozhikode City
