= Assam State Zoo cum Botanical Garden =

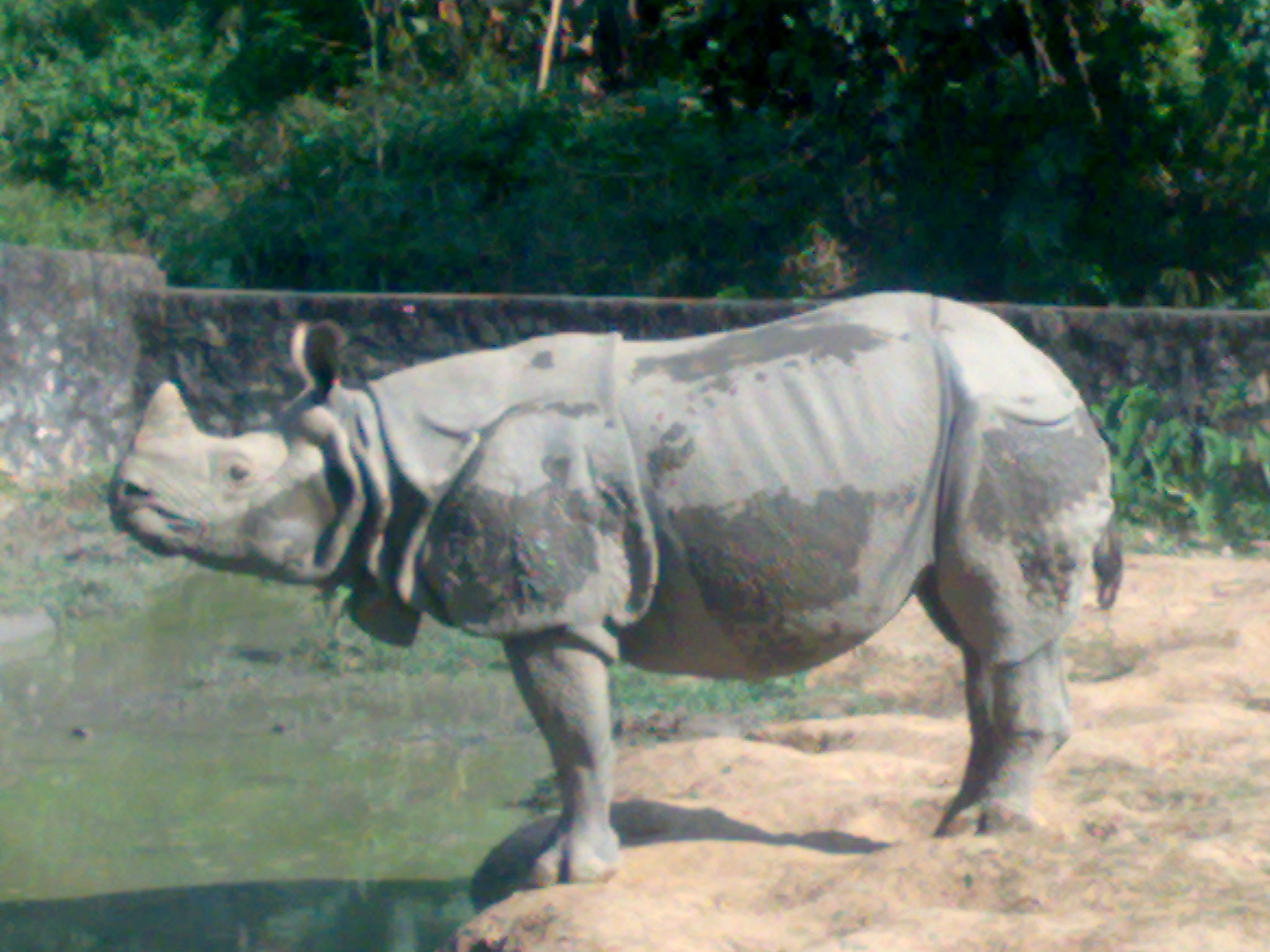
- Rhino at the zoo
- Interactive map of Assam State Zoo cum Botanical Garden
- 26.1632°N 91.7868°E
- Date opened: 1 August 1958; 67 years ago
- Location: Zoo Road, Guwahati, India
- Land area: 432.435 acres (175.000 ha)
- Annual visitors: 450000
- Memberships: CZA
- Major exhibits: One horned Indian rhinoceros, tiger, clouded leopard, golden langur, hoolock gibbon, serow, elephant, brow antlered deer, slow loris, Himalayan black bear, leopard cat, binturong, jungle cat
- Website: assamstatezoo.in

The Assam State Zoo cum Botanical Garden (popularly known as Guwahati Zoo) is the largest of its kind in the North East region and it is spread across 432 acre (175 hectare). The zoo is located within the Hengrabari Reserved Forest at Guwahati, India. The zoo is home to about more than 1125 numbers of animals, birds and reptiles representing over 115 species of animals and birds from around the world.

The Divisional officer of Assam State Zoo is Dr. Ashwini Kumar, IFS.

== History ==
The 64th session of Indian National Congress was held in Guwahati, in 1957. The Organising committee of INC organised an exhibit with included few animals and birds, of which a female leopard cub named Spotty was the favourite. After the meeting came to an end, it was felt to necessity of a zoo to house these animals.

These animals were shifted to Japorigog in the Hengrabari Reserve forest, with an area of 130 Hectare, suitable to create facilities and house these animals, thus, The Assam State Zoo was established in the year 1957 and was open to public viewing in the year 1958.

Over the years, the zoo grew and expanded to accommodate eye-catching exotic ones like Orangutans, black panther & Indian rhinoceros, zebras, ostriches and giraffes, etc. To get these exotic animals the zoo used to send indigenous animals like one horned Indian rhinoceros and others, to many countries. Through later the importance was shifted to indigenous species and several captive breeding programs also started which were successful. In the year 1959 a forest division was created as Assam State Zoo Division and the zoo was put under this division.

The Assam State Zoo also added a museum and in the year 1982 a botanical garden and so Assam State Zoo became The Assam State Zoo cum Botanical Garden.

In 2002 another 45 hectare area of the Hengrabari Reserve Forests were added to the zoo and thus, the total area of the zoo became 175 hectare and in August, 2005 the Animal Adoption Scheme launched.

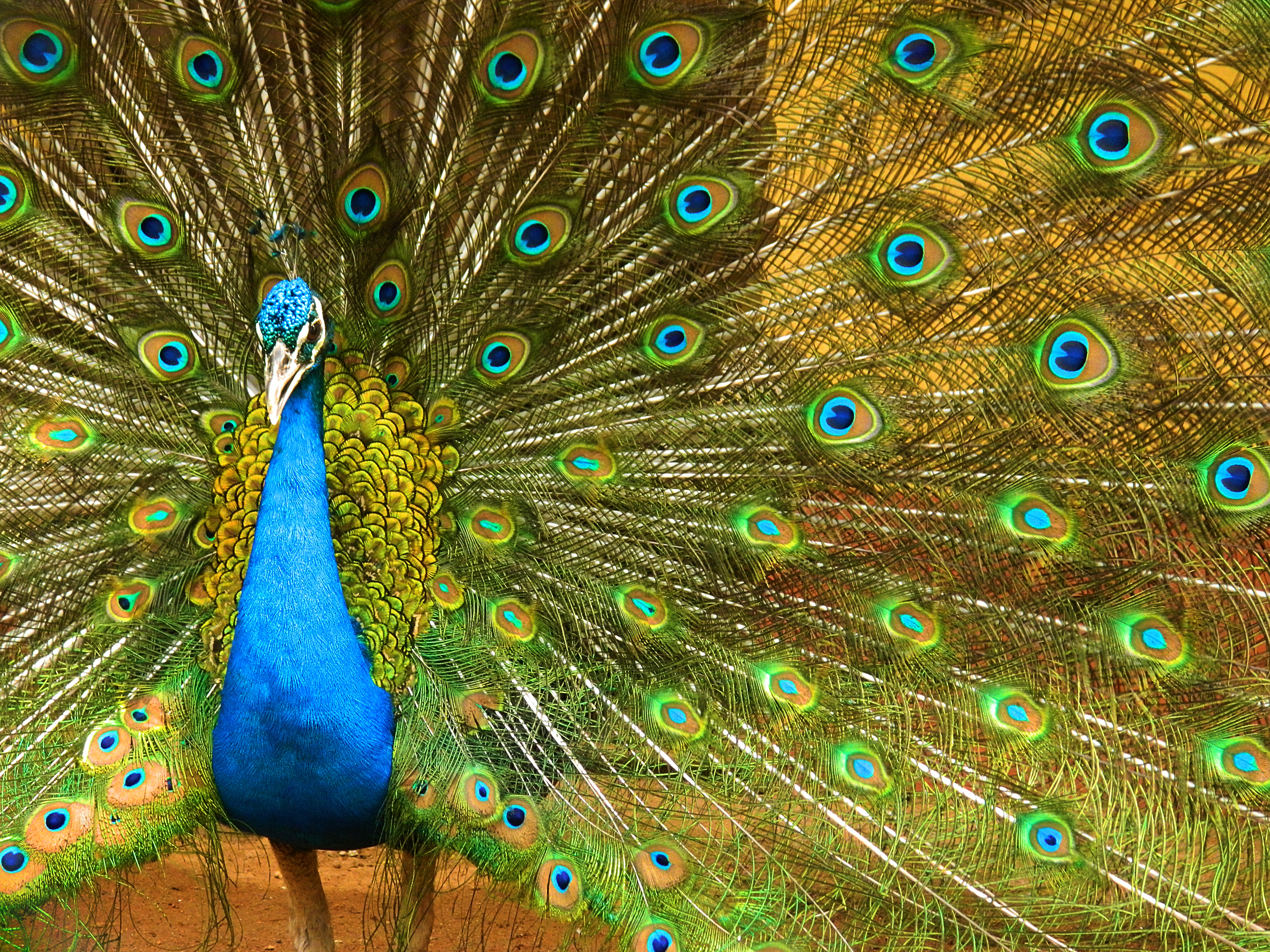
Male Indian peafowl

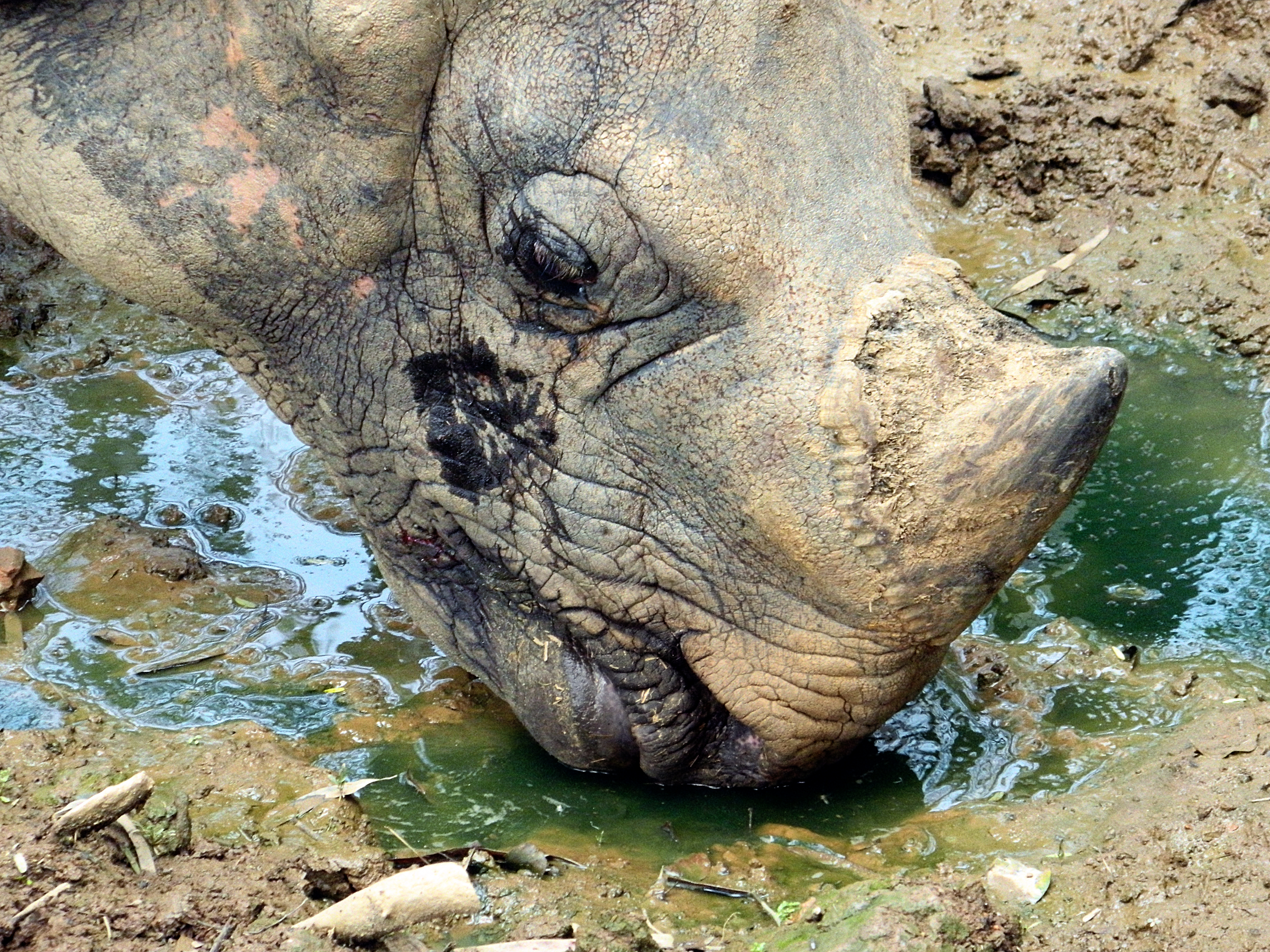
Single horn of an Indian rhinoceros

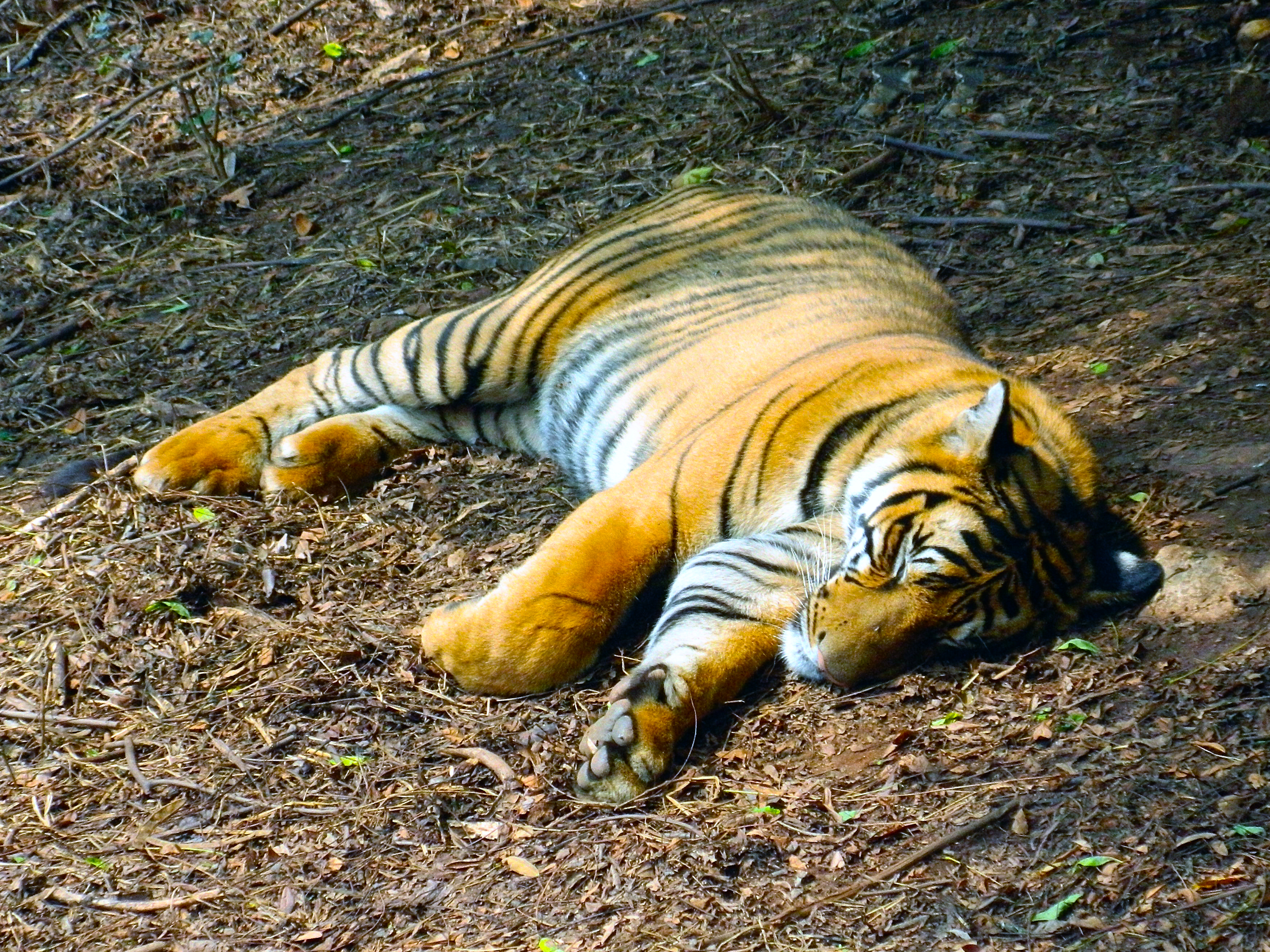
An Indian tiger

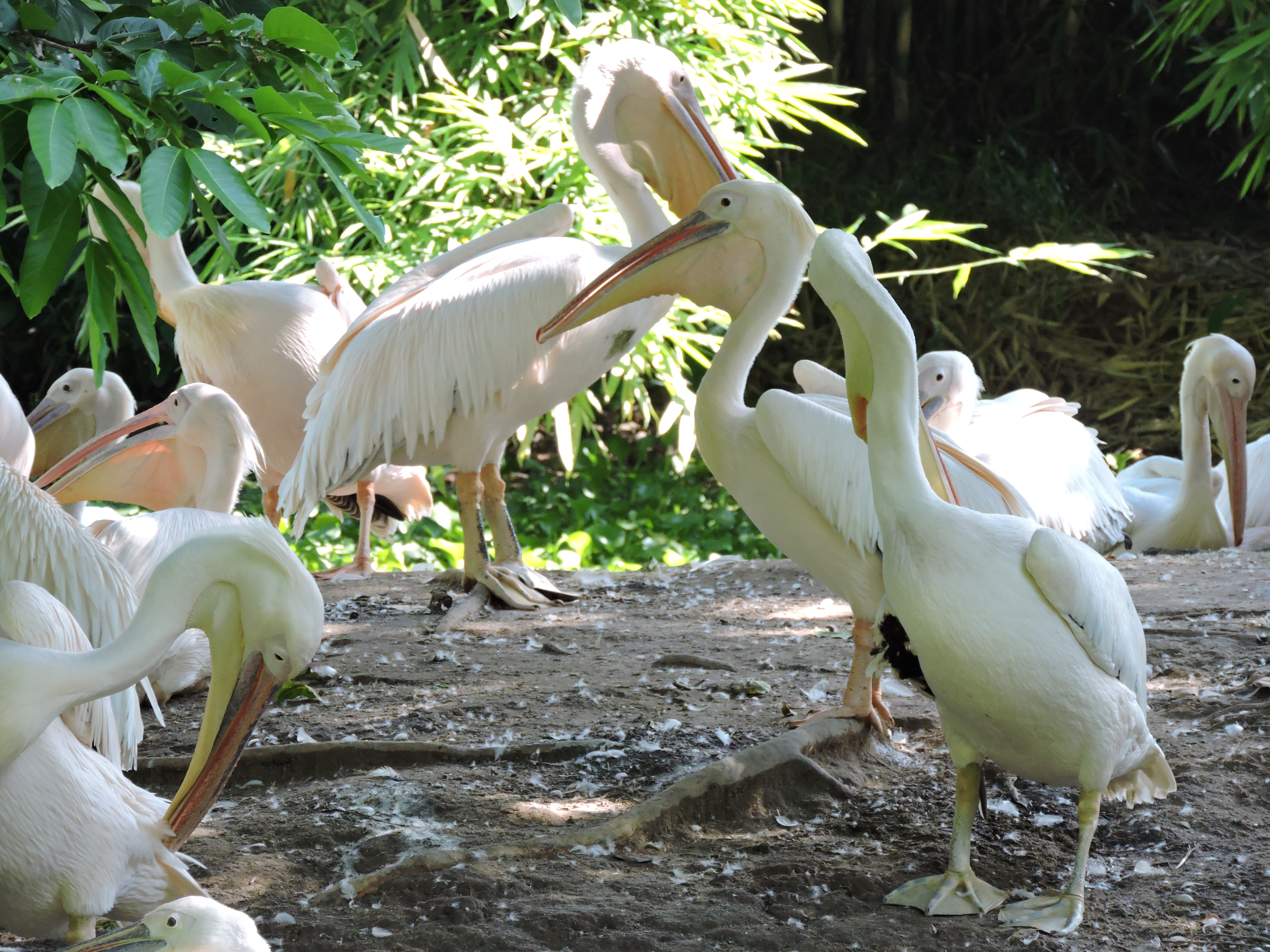
Pelican in flock

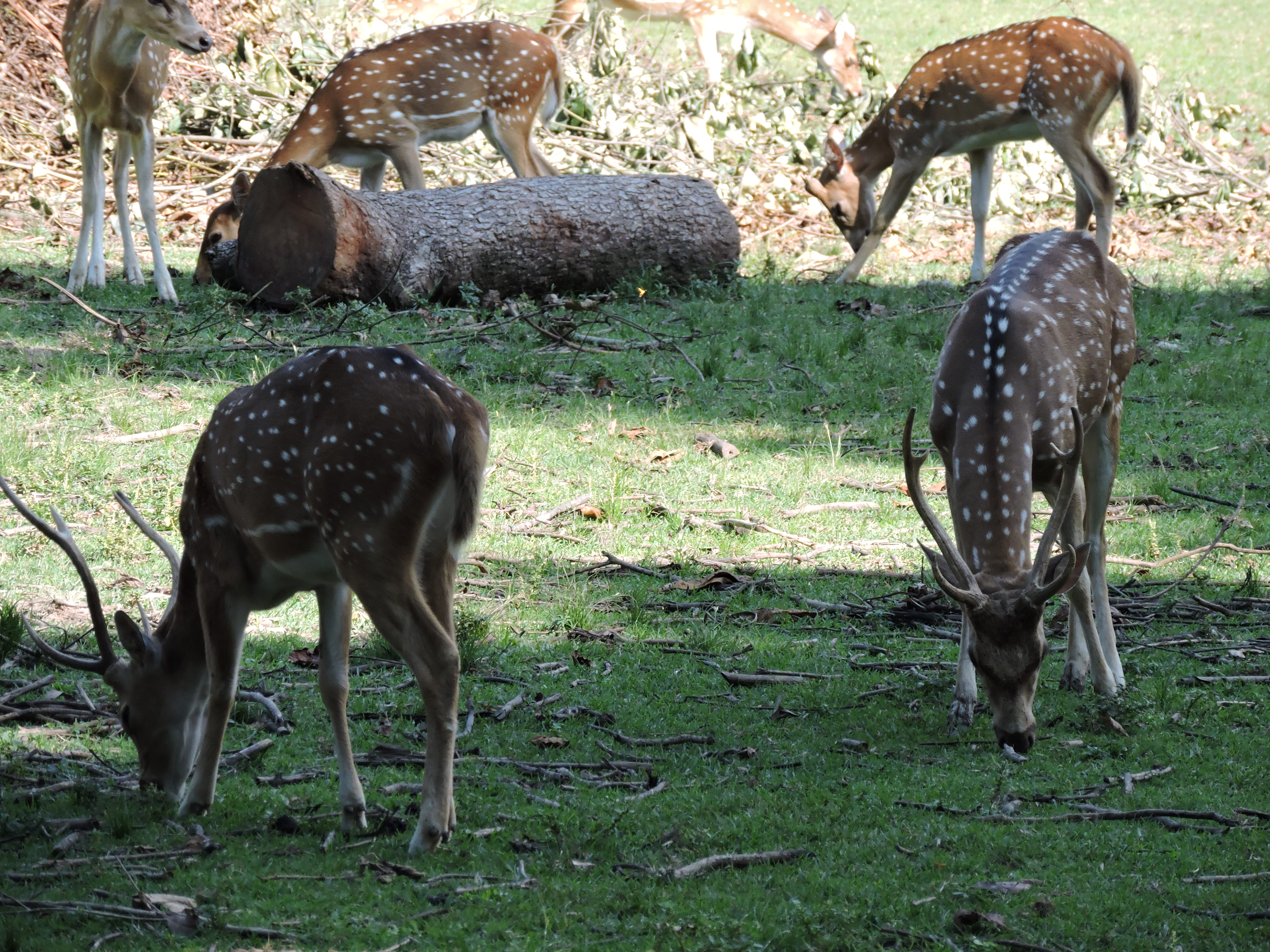
Chital or spotted deer

== See also ==
- List of Botanical Gardens in India and the "Indian portion" of the international List of botanical gardens
