= IRTC =

IRTC may refer to:

- Integrated Rural Technology Centre, a research center in Mundur, Palakkad, Kerala, India
- Incheon Rapid Transit Corporation
