= Sudhir Kumar Rawal =

Indian urologist and oncologist

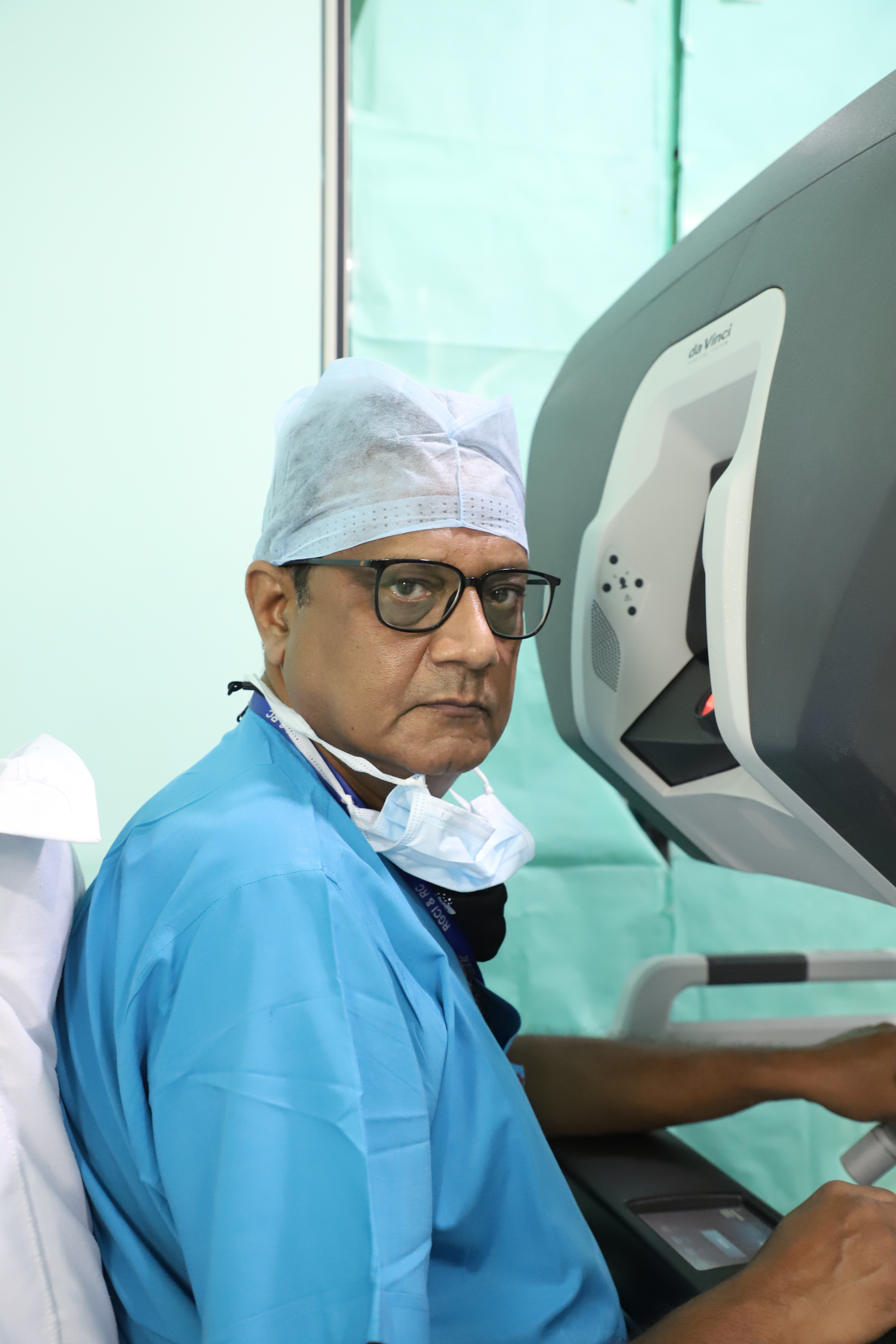
- Rawal performing robotic surgery
- Born: 5 January 1962 (age 64)
- Education: Christian Medical College, Vellore (M.Ch. Urology)
- Occupations: Oncologist, Genito-urinary
- Known for: Robotic Surgery
- Website: www.rgcirc.org/doctor/dr-sudhir-kumar-rawal/

Sudhir Kumar Rawal (born January 5, 1962) is an Indian urologist and oncologist, specializing in uro-genital oncology and robotic surgery. He is the medical director and Chief of Urogenito Oncology at the Rajiv Gandhi Cancer Institute and Research Centre (RGCIRC), Delhi. With over three decades of medical expertise, he is recognized for his contributions to robotic surgical systems and advancements in cancer care in India.

== Early life and education ==
Dr. Sudhir Kumar Rawal was born on January 5, 1962. He earned his MBBS from King George's Medical University, Lucknow, in 1986 and his MS (General Surgery) in 1990 from the same institution. In 1995, he completed his M.Ch. in Urology from Christian Medical College, Vellore, and subsequently earned a DNB in Urology from the National Board of Examinations, New Delhi. In 2001, he completed a postdoctoral fellowship at the Centre for Prostate Disease Research, Rockville, USA, where he contributed to prostate cancer studies.

== Medical career ==
Rawal began his career at Safdarjung Hospital, New Delhi, before moving to Christian Medical College, Vellore. He joined Rajiv Gandhi Cancer Institute and Research Centre (RGCIRC) in 1996, where he established the Department of Uro-Genito Oncology and led the department for robotic and minimally invasive surgeries.

== Robotic surgery ==
- Conducted the world's first mini-laparoscopic radical cystoprostatectomy.
- Led the development and clinical trials of India's first indigenous robotic surgical system.
- Conducted clinical trial of telesurgery while sitting in Gurugram, Haryana, 40 kilometers away, and operated at RGCIRC, Rohini, Delhi.

== Academic contributions and publications ==
Dr. Rawal has authored over 100 articles in peer-reviewed journals. Notable works include:

- Predicting intraoperative events using machine learning.
- Evaluation of RECIST, PERCIST, EORTC, and MDA Criteria for Assessing Treatment Response with Ga68-PSMA PET-CT in Metastatic Prostate Cancer Patient with Biochemical Progression: a Comparative Study.
- Pitcher's pot Ileal Neobladder.
- Minilaparotomy Radical Cystoprostatectomy (Minilap RCP) in the Surgical Management of Urinary Bladder Carcinoma: Early Experience.

He has presented papers and delivered guest lectures at national and international conferences, including the European Association of Urology (EAU) and the Société Internationale d’Urologie (SIU).
