= Kerala School of Mathematics =

Kerala School of Mathematics may refer to:

- Kerala School of Astronomy and Mathematics, a school that existed in Kerala, India between 14th and 16th century CE and had produced pioneering mathematical research such as on Infinite series (well before the development of the theory of modern calculus in Europe)
- Kerala School of Mathematics, Kozhikode, in Kunnamangalam near Kozhikode, Kerala, India
