= Department of Science and Technology (Kerala) =

Government department of Kerala, India

Department overview
- Jurisdiction: Government of Kerala
- Headquarters: Government Secretariat, Thiruvananthapuram
- Minister responsible: V.D. Satheesan, Minister for Science and Technology
- Department executive: Dr K K Ramachandran, Ex officio Principal Secretary to Government
- Parent department: Government of Kerala
- Child Department: Kerala State Council for Science, Technology and Environment

The Department of Science and Technology is an administrative department of the Government of Kerala. It is responsible for policy formulation and implementation related to the promotion of science, technology, and innovation in the State of Kerala. The department is the nodal authority for science and technology matters, including biotechnology policy and support to research and development institutions.

== Governance and administration ==
The department is under the leadership of a Cabinet minister for science and technology, and the incumbent minister responsible is V.D. Satheesan who is the Chief Minister of Kerala. The department is administratively headed by a Principal Secretary to the Government, normally a Scientist. The Secretary is assisted by additional, joint, deputy, and under secretaries at the Secretariat.

== Functions ==
The department is responsible for coordinating government initiatives in the science and technology sector and for promoting scientific research, innovation, and technology-based development in the State. It oversees policy matters related to biotechnology and provides assistance to science and technology research centres.

== Child agencies, institutions ==
The department is also responsible for the administration of its child agencies and research institutions under the Kerala State Council for Science, Technology and Environment (KSCSTE), including:

- Centre for Water Resources Development and Management (CWRDM)
- Kerala Forest Research Institute (KFRI)
- National Transportation Planning and Research Centre (NATPAC)
- Tropical Botanic Garden and Research Institute (TBGRI)
- Malabar Botanical Garden and Institute for Plant Sciences (MBGIPS)
- Institute of Advanced Virology (IAV)
- Kerala School of Mathematics(KSoM)
- Centre of Excellence in Microbiom (CoEM)
- Centre of Excellence in Nutraceuticals (CoEN)
- Institute for Climate Change Studies (ICCS)

== See also ==
- Government of Kerala
