= Kerala State Council for Science, Technology and Environment =

Science and technology promotion organization in Kerala, India

Agency overview
- Formed: November 2002
- Preceding agency: Science, Technology and Environment Committee (STEC)
- Jurisdiction: Government of Kerala
- Headquarters: Sasthra Bhavan, Pattom, Thiruvananthapuram, Kerala
- Minister responsible: V.D. Satheesan (Chief Minister), President
- Agency executives: Dr. K K Ramachandran, Executive Vice President; Dr P Harinarayanan, Member Secretary
- Parent department: Department of Science and Technology, Government of Kerala
- Child agencies: Centre for Water Resources Development and Management; Kerala Forest Research Institute; Jawaharlal Nehru Tropical Botanic Garden and Research Institute; National Transportation Planning and Research Centre; Institute for Climate Change Studies; Malabar Botanical Garden and Institute for Plant Sciences; Srinivasa Ramanujan Institute for Basic Sciences
- Website: kscste.kerala.gov.in

Kerala State Council for Science, Technology and Environment (KSCSTE) is an autonomous body constituted by the Government of Kerala in November 2002 to encourage and promote science and technology-related activities in Kerala State. Prior to the establishment of KSCSTE, the body responsible for carrying out similar work was the State Committee for Science, Technology and Environment (STEC) established in 1972. KSCSTE was formed by restructuring STEC in concurrence with the Science Policy of Government of India.

Based in Thiruvananthapuram, KSCSTE is running seven R&D centres in different parts of Kerala. It has several programmes like Science Popularisation and Women Scientists Cell to promote its objectives. The Council coordinates the state-level activities in connection with the observances of the National Science Day, National Technology Day and World Environment Day. It has instituted three awards: Dr. S Vasudev Award, Science Literature Awards(SLA) and Kerala State Young Scientists Award (KSYSA) which are presented annually. Every year KSCSTE also organises the Kerala Science Congress and Children's Science Congress. It supports two grant-in-aid centres as well.

The apex body of KSCSTE is the State Council with Chief Minister of Kerala as the president. The chief executive officer of the Council is Executive Vice President.

== R&D centres under KSCSTE ==
- Kerala Forest Research Institute (KFRI) Thrissur
- National Transportation Planning and Research Centre (NATPAC) Thiruvananthapuram
- Centre for Water Resources Development and Management (CWRDM) Kozhikode
- Jawaharlal Nehru Tropical Botanic Garden and Research Institute (JNTBGRI) Thiruvananthapuram
- Kerala School of Mathematics (KSoM) Kozhikode
- Srinivasa Ramanujan Institute of Basic Sciences (SRIBS) Kottayam
- Malabar Botanical Garden and Institute for Plant Sciences(MBGIPS) Kozhikode
- Institute for Climate Change Studies (ICCS) Kottayam

== Grant-in-aid Centres of KSCSTE ==
- IRTC
- STIC CUSAT
- MSSRF

== Former R&D centres under KSCSTE ==
- IAV Thiruvananthapuram
- RGCB Thiruvananthapuram
- NCESS Thiruvananthapuram
- ANERT Thiruvananthapuram
- CDS Thiruvananthapuram

== See also ==
- Department of Science and Technology (Kerala)
- Department of Environment (Kerala)
