= Rajiv Gandhi Centre for Biotechnology =

Research Institute in India

Rajiv Gandhi Centre for Biotechnology (RGCB)
- Former names: Centre for Development of Education, Science and Technology (C-DEST); Rajiv Gandhi Centre for Development of Education, Science and Technology (RGC-DEST)
- Motto: Discoveries for better tomorrow
- Established: 1990; 36 years ago
- Parent institution: Ministry of Science and Technology (Department of Biotechnology), Government of India
- Academic affiliations: University of Kerala; Regional Centre for Biotechnology; Manipal Academy of Higher Education
- Director: Chandrabhas Narayana
- Academic staff: 45
- Administrative staff: 27 + 54
- Address: Thycaud Post, Poojappura, Thiruvananthapuram - 695 014, Kerala, India, Thiruvananthapuram, Kerala
- Campus: Urban
- Website: https://rgcb.res.in/
- RGCB also provide Medical Laboratory Services, Regional Facility for DNA Fingerprinting, Research Consultancy Services & Molecular Platforms, Laboratory Medicine and Molecular Diagnostics (LMMD)

Rajiv Gandhi Centre for Biotechnology is a research institute in India, exclusive devoted to research in Molecular Biology and Biotechnology. It is located at Thiruvananthapuram, the capital city of the state of Kerala in India. This centre is an autonomous institute under the Department of Biotechnology of the Govt. of India. Previously, it was an R&D centre under Kerala State Council for Science, Technology and Environment which is a funding agency for research Institutes and centers in Kerala.

== History ==
The centre was inaugurated on 18 November 2002 by then President of India, Dr. APJ Abdul Kalam. The institute has highly focused research departments working on different areas of biological sciences under following areas.

- Cancer Research
- Cardiovascular Disease & Diabetes Biology
- Pathogen Biology
- Regenerative Biology
- Plant Biotechnology & Disease Biology
- Neurobiology
- Reproduction Biology
- Transdisciplinary Biology

The Center has a regional facility for Genetic Fingerprinting, which provides DNA analysis services for forensic & criminal investigations, paternity disputes, identification of wildlife remains, authentication of plants and seeds besides a battery of molecular diagnostics for genetic and infectious diseases. RGCB is also a major provider of laboratory and infrastructure services to other academic and research institutions. RGCB has a strength of 25 scientists, 120 Ph.D. students and around 100 research project staff. The centre has good infrastructural facilities for carrying out research in the field of Biotechnology. Financial support of Rs. 100 crores sanctioned by the Govt. of India in 2008, for a period of 3 years, apart from the yearly allocation of Rs. 25 crores, aims at making RGCB a world class research centre in the near future. RGCB is set to expand further into a second campus at Aakkulum shortly. It would focus on R & D and also provide a unique "TEST & PROVE" facility to encourage biotechnology. BioSpectrum magazine ranked Bio-Technology course at RGCB as second best in the country only after Institute of Chemical Technology, Mumbai.

RGCB started setting up a BSL4 lab in 2020.

== See also ==
- Rajiv Gandhi Cancer Institute and Research Centre
