= Integrated Rural Technology Centre =

Indian research center

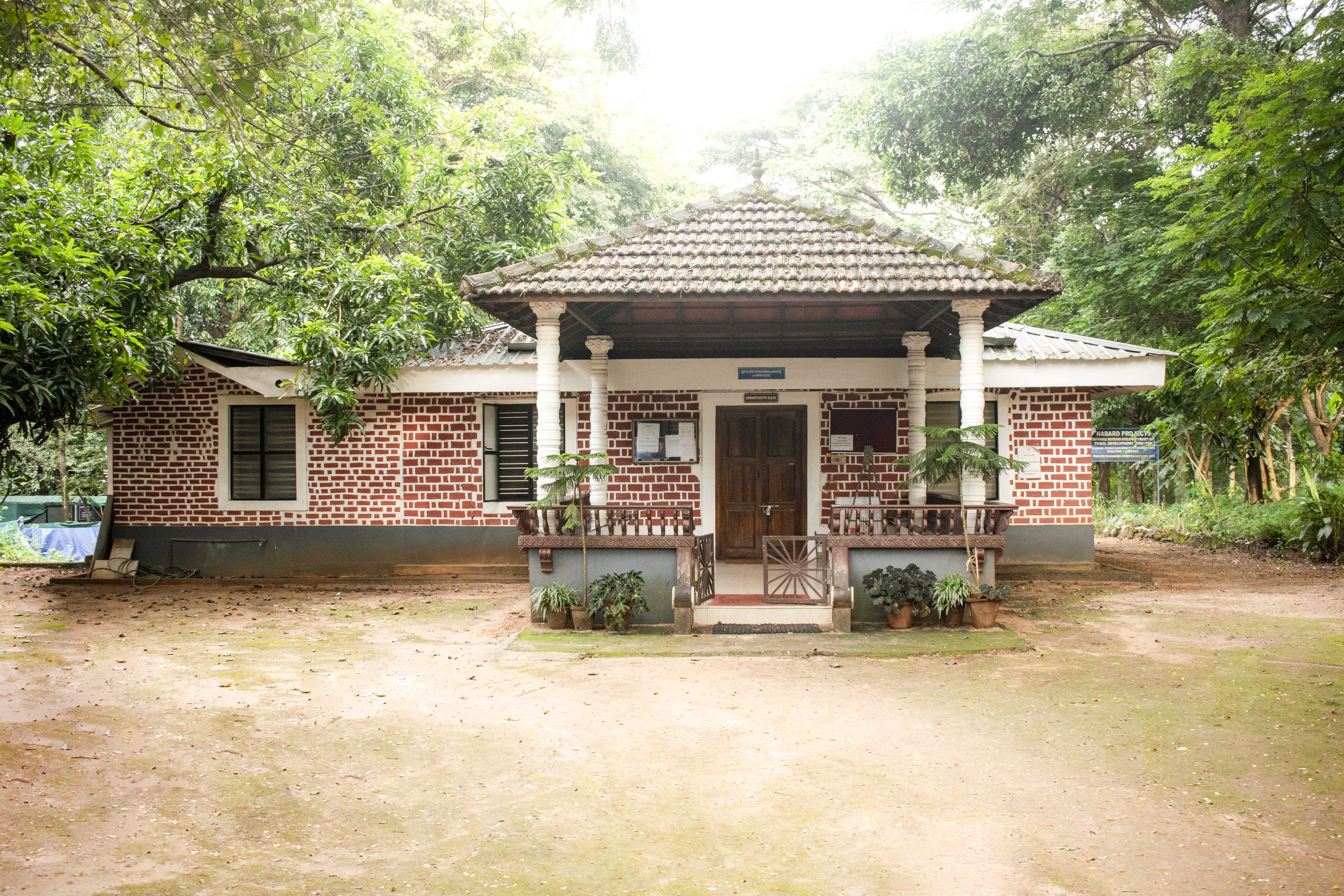
IRTC Office
Established	1987
Location	Palakkad, Kerala, India
Homepage	www.irtc.org.in/

Integrated Rural Technology Centre is an independent Research and Development organization founded by Kerala Sathra Sahithya Parishad and a grant-in-aid institute of Kerala State Council for Science Technology and Environment, Government of Kerala. The institution was established in 1987 and is located at Palakkad district in Kerala.

IRTC has been at the forefront of rural innovation in the country, with several products and ideas contributing to enhance the lives of rural poor. The aim of this organization is to spread Science and Technology among masses and to create a technology- human interface. The institution is constantly working to meet the challenges in front and find amicable and sustainable solutions to improve the standard of life.

IRTC has played a significant role in handholding the local self-government institutions across the state through their project implementation and consultancy support for preparing Detailed Project Reports for various developmental programmes. IRTC has extensively involved in research, innovation and extension activities to empower the marginalized communities across the state. It has contributed much in the areas of women and child development with the collaboration of national and international agencies such as WHO, UNICEF, UNDP, NABARD, DST, DBT, KILA, etc.

IRTC is a Centre of Excellence in Waste Management and an accredited agency of Government of Kerala for preparing watershed DPR.

== Major Divisions ==
- Solid waste management
- Natural Resource Management with a focus on watershed development
- Energy management
- Social Science
- Livelihood

== Area of work ==
Smokeless chulha, hotbox, small hydel projects in Meenvallom and Palakuzhi, grassroots planning initiatives, resource mapping, farmer-producer collectives, Solid Waste Management, Biogas plants, experiments with inoculum, Resource Mapping, Application of GIS and remote sensing tools in resource mapping, watershed based development and natural disaster management, Watershed Based Development, Rural Engineering, Chemical Analysis, Gender Studies, Rabbit rearing, Aquaculture, Ornamental Fisheries, Mushroom Culture, Post-Harvest Technologies, Fruit Processing, Biomass Gasification, Planning & Development Consultancy, Education Research and Intervention, Electronic Ballast, Compact Fluorescent Lamps, Portable Domestic Biogas Plants, Small Hydro Power Projects, Solar Driers, Mechanised Potter's Wheel, Pug Mill, etc. have made an impact on rural lives.

== Sister Concerns ==
- Project Implementation Unit (PIU)
- Parishad Production Centre (PPC)

== Facilities ==
- IRTC Laboratory
  - Soil, Water and Compost testing facilities
- Library
- GIS and Remote Sensing Laboratory
- Automatic Weather Station
- Mushroom, Fisheries and Aquaculture unit
- Trainings and student internships
- Food and accommodation
- Campus visits

== Gallery ==
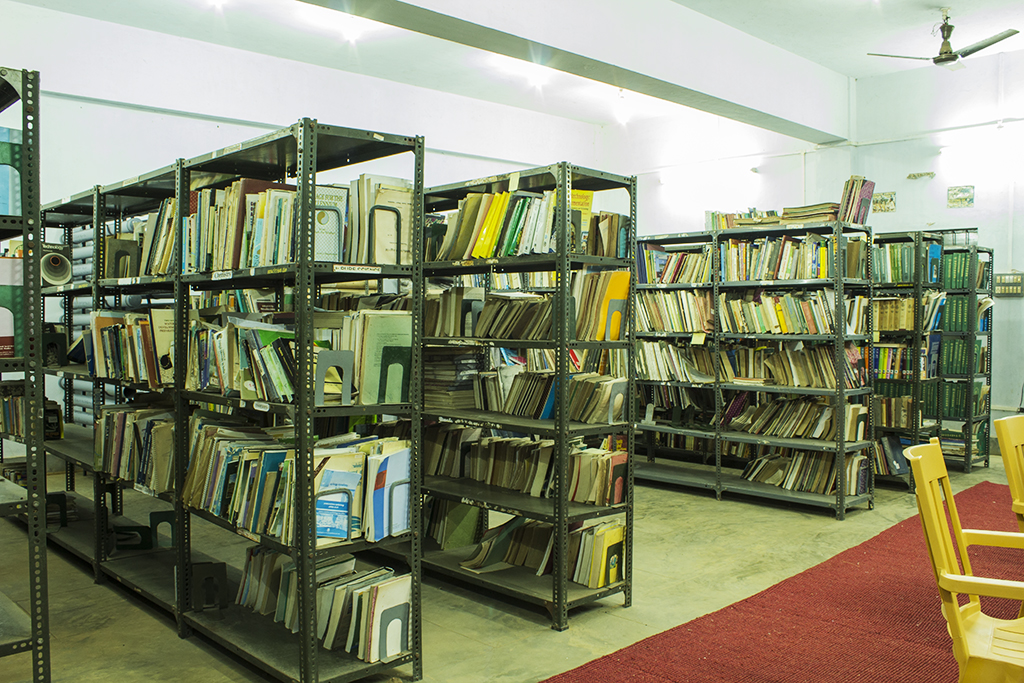
Library

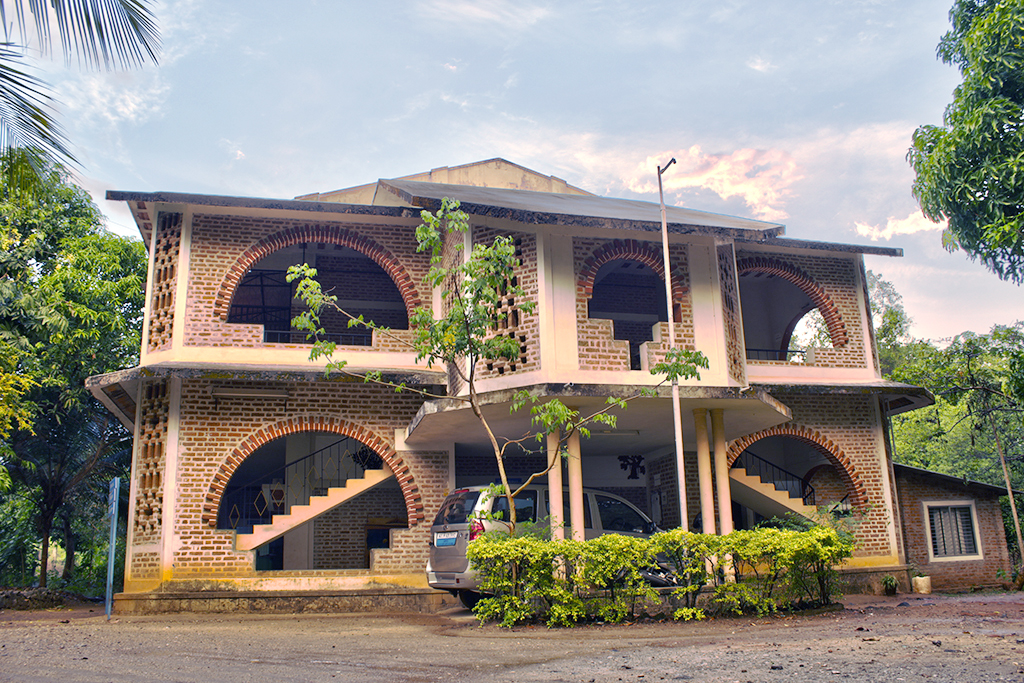
Auditorium

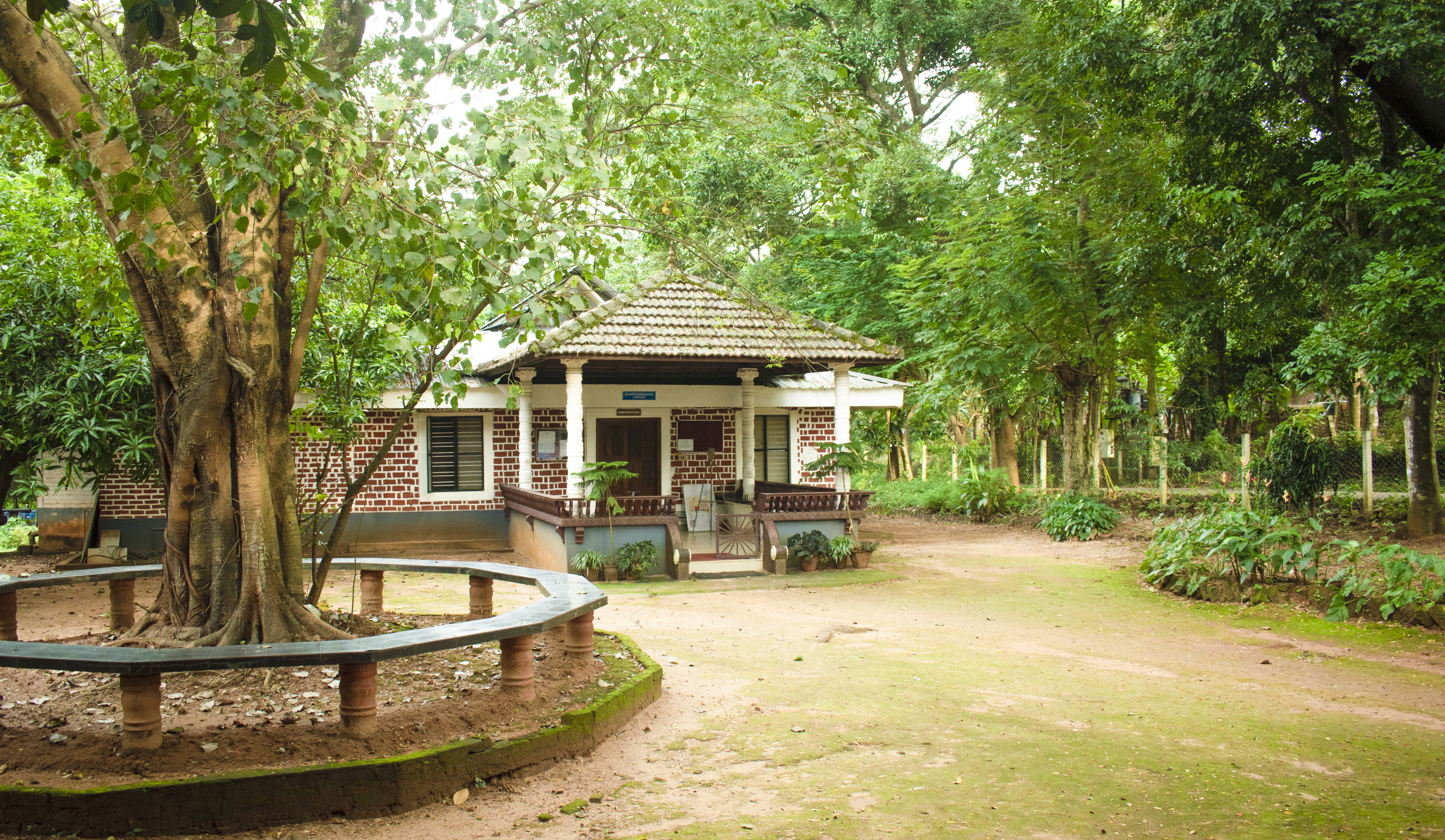
Front office

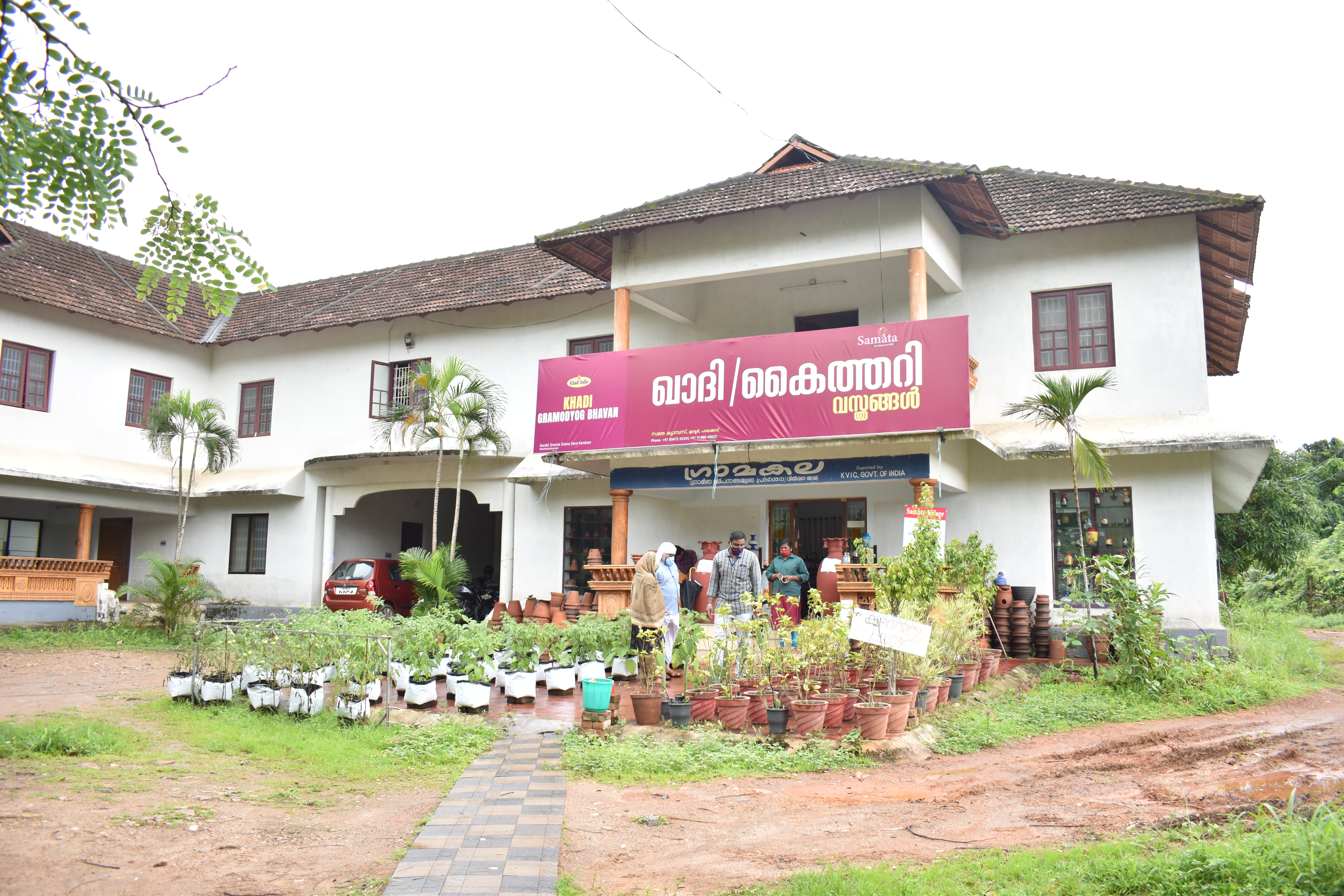
Jubilee Campus

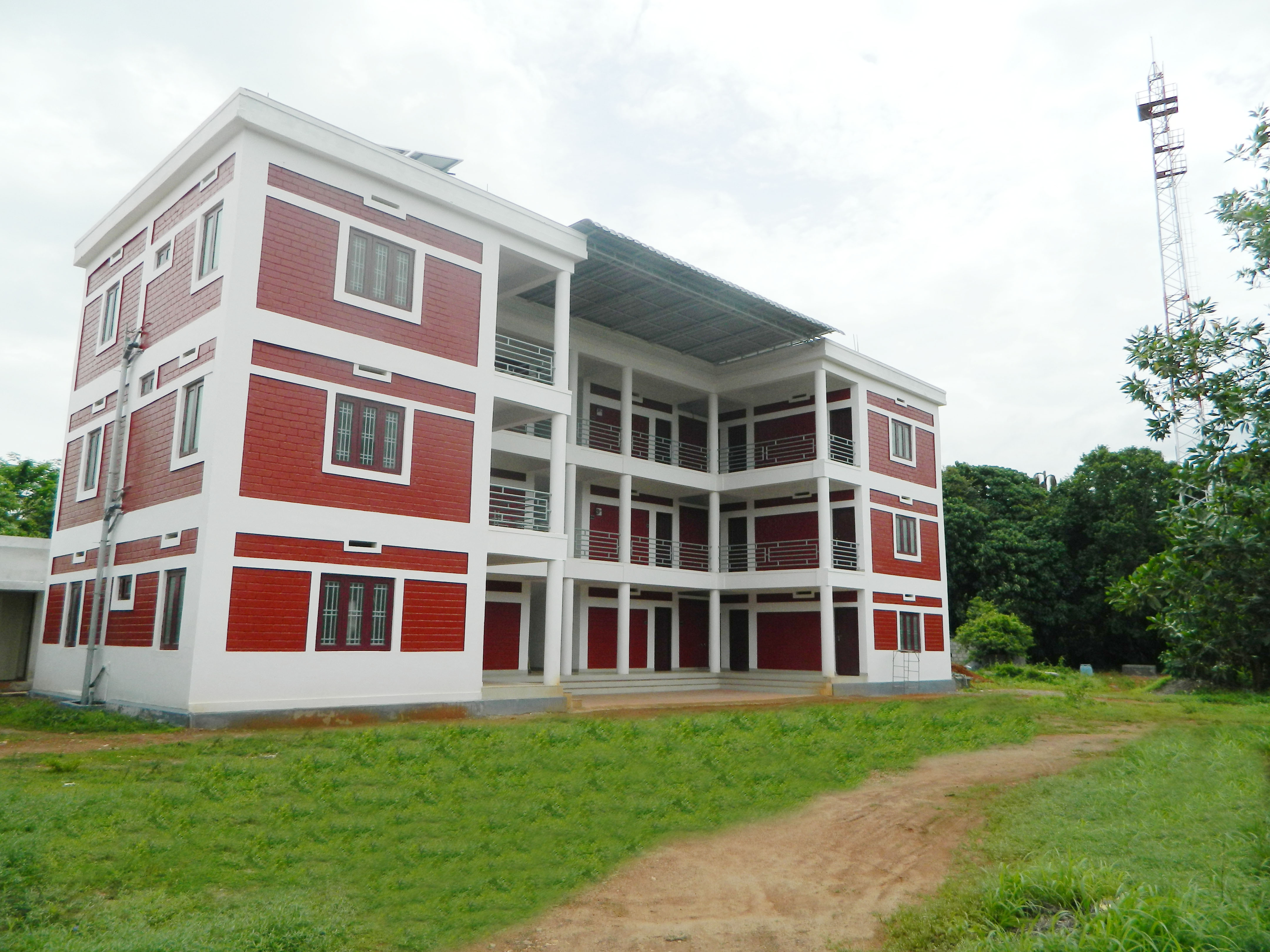
Hostel in Jubilee Campus

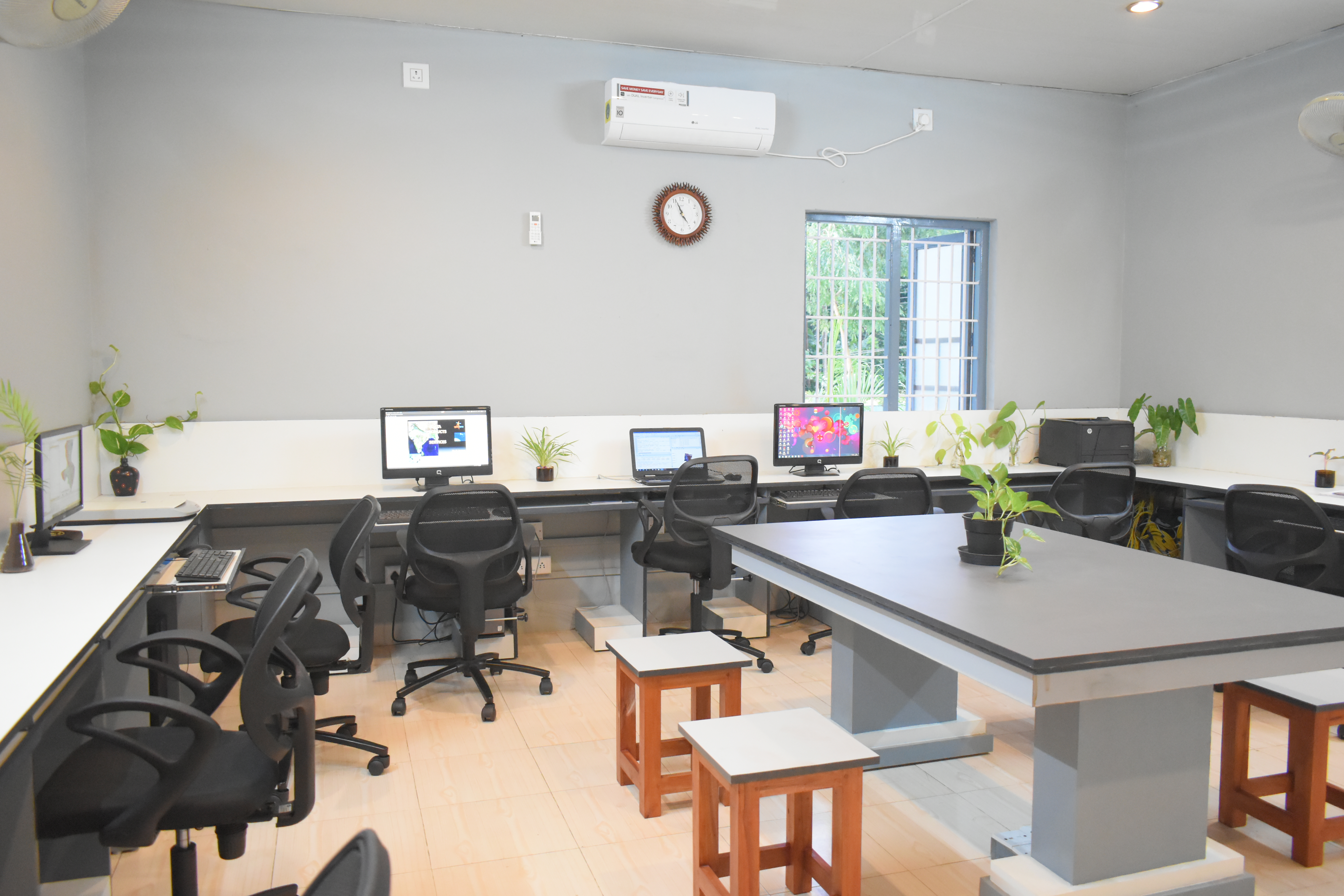
Centre for Geoinformatics Lab

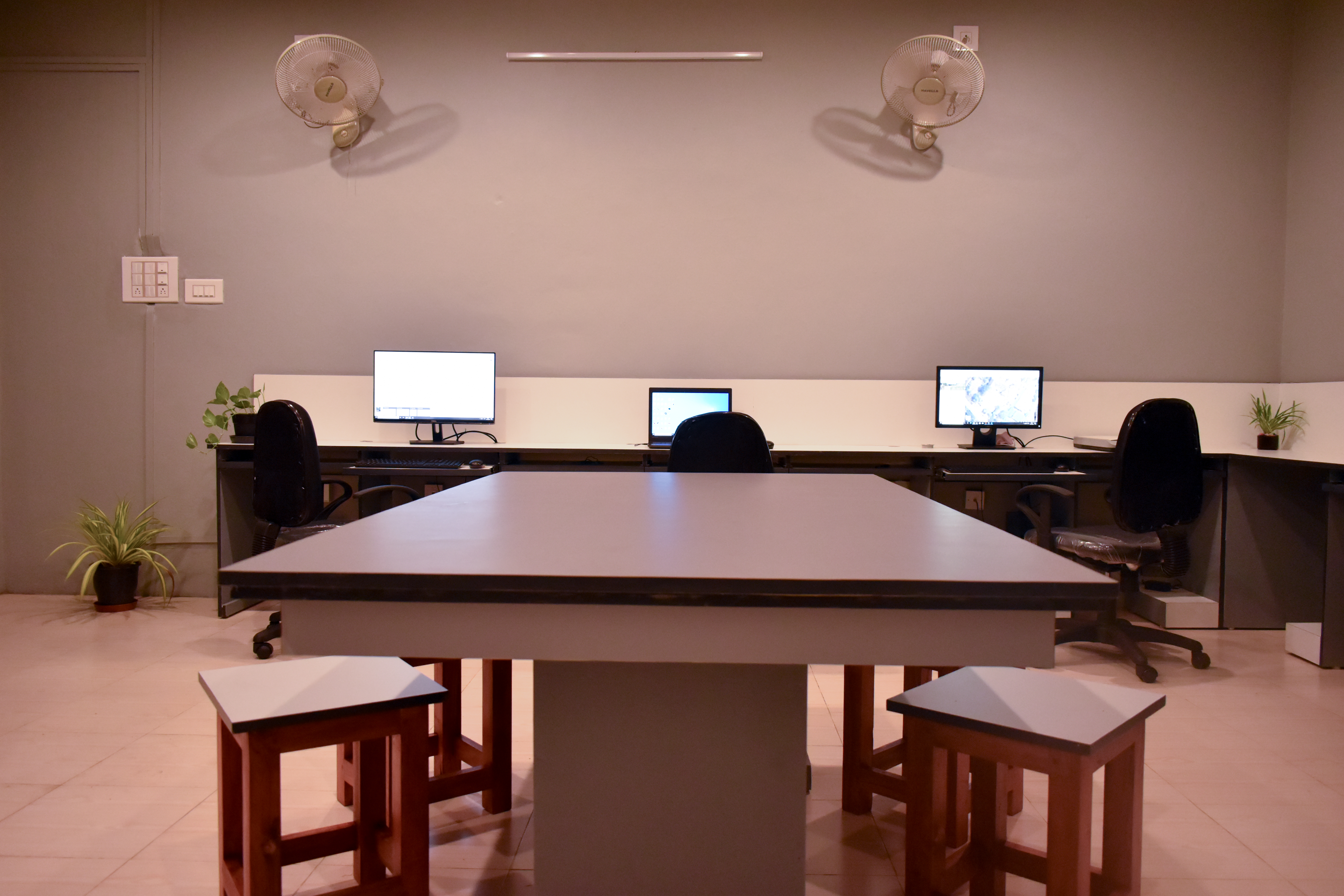
Centre for Geoinformatics Lab

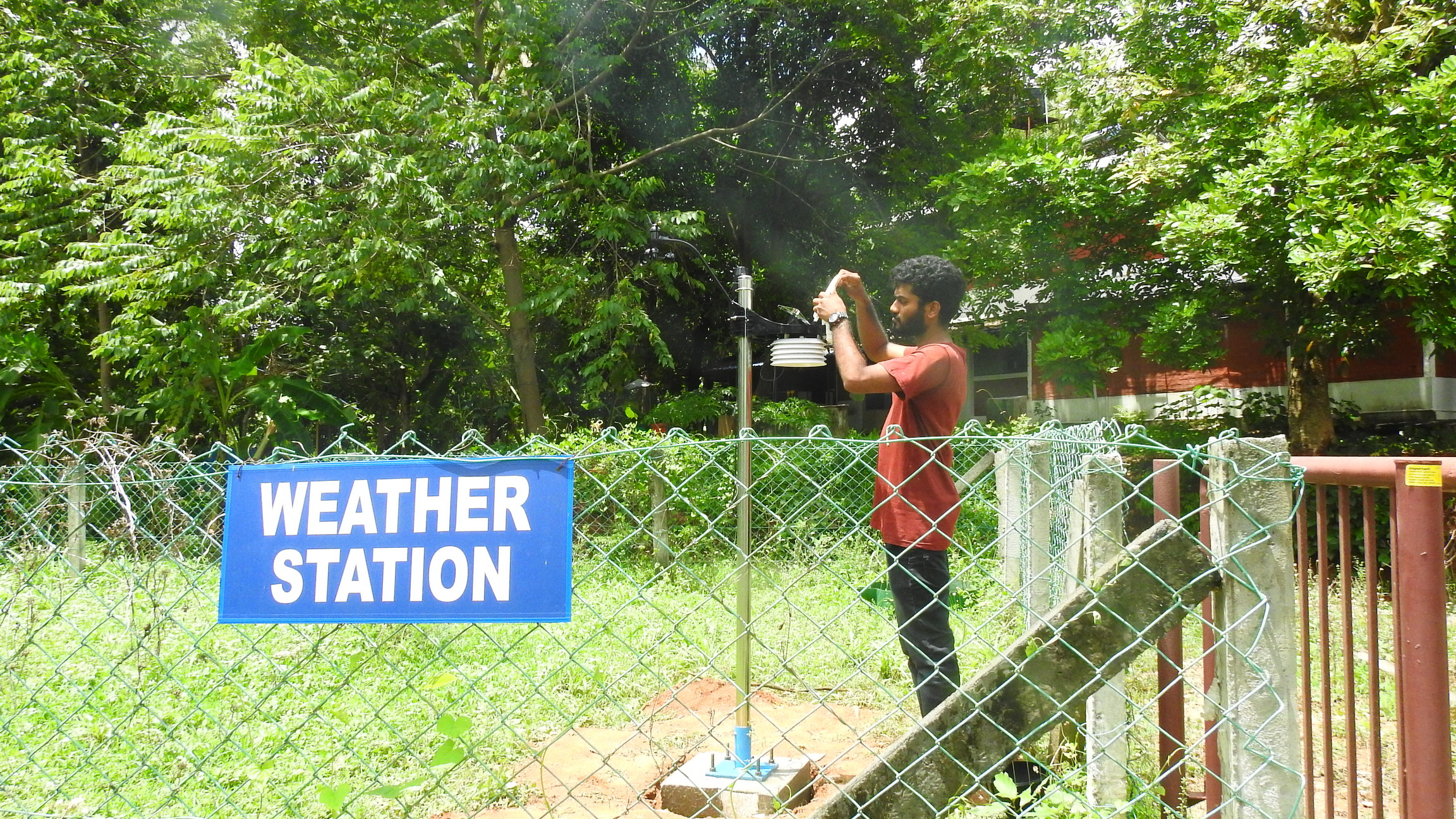
Automatics weather station

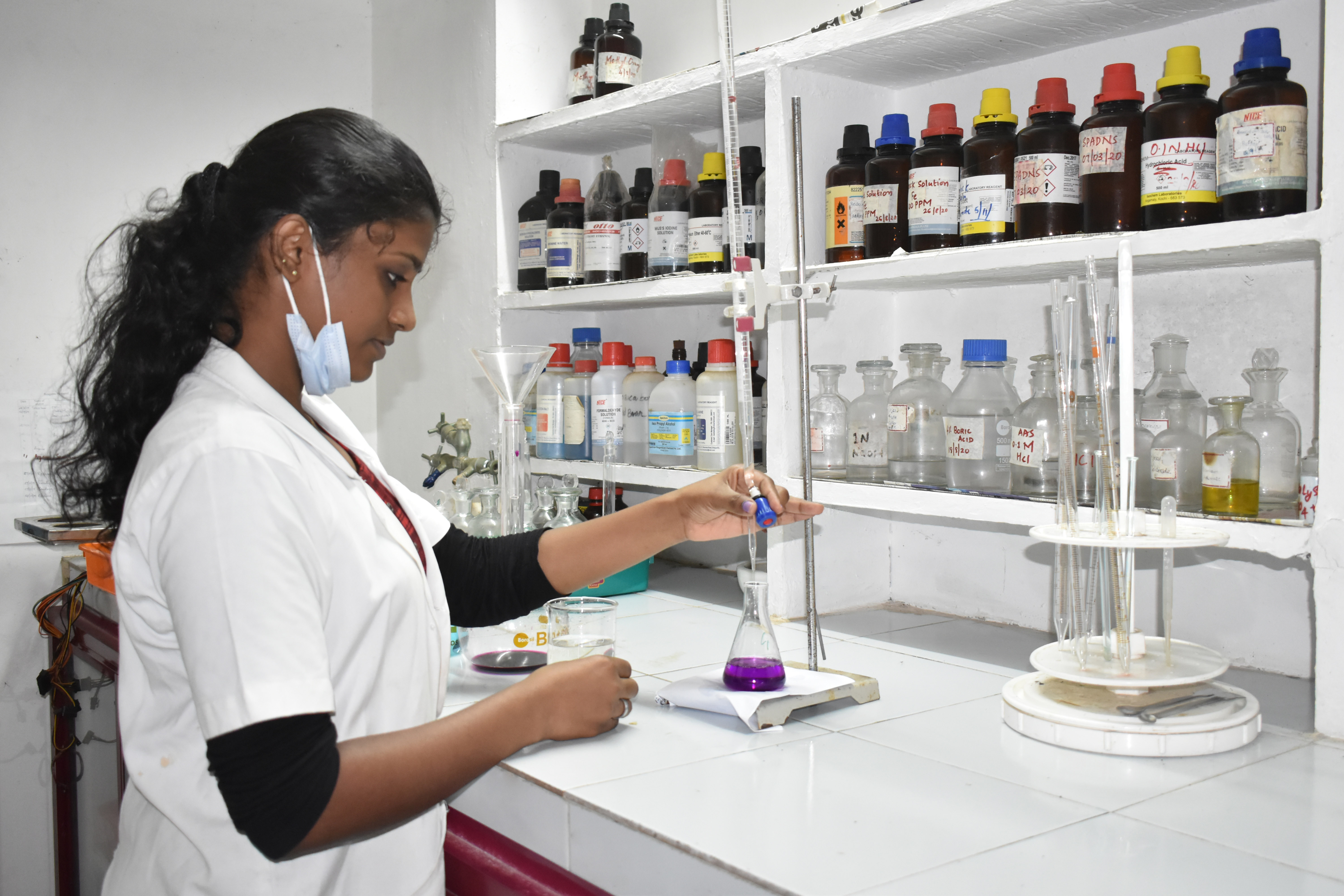
Water testing laboratory

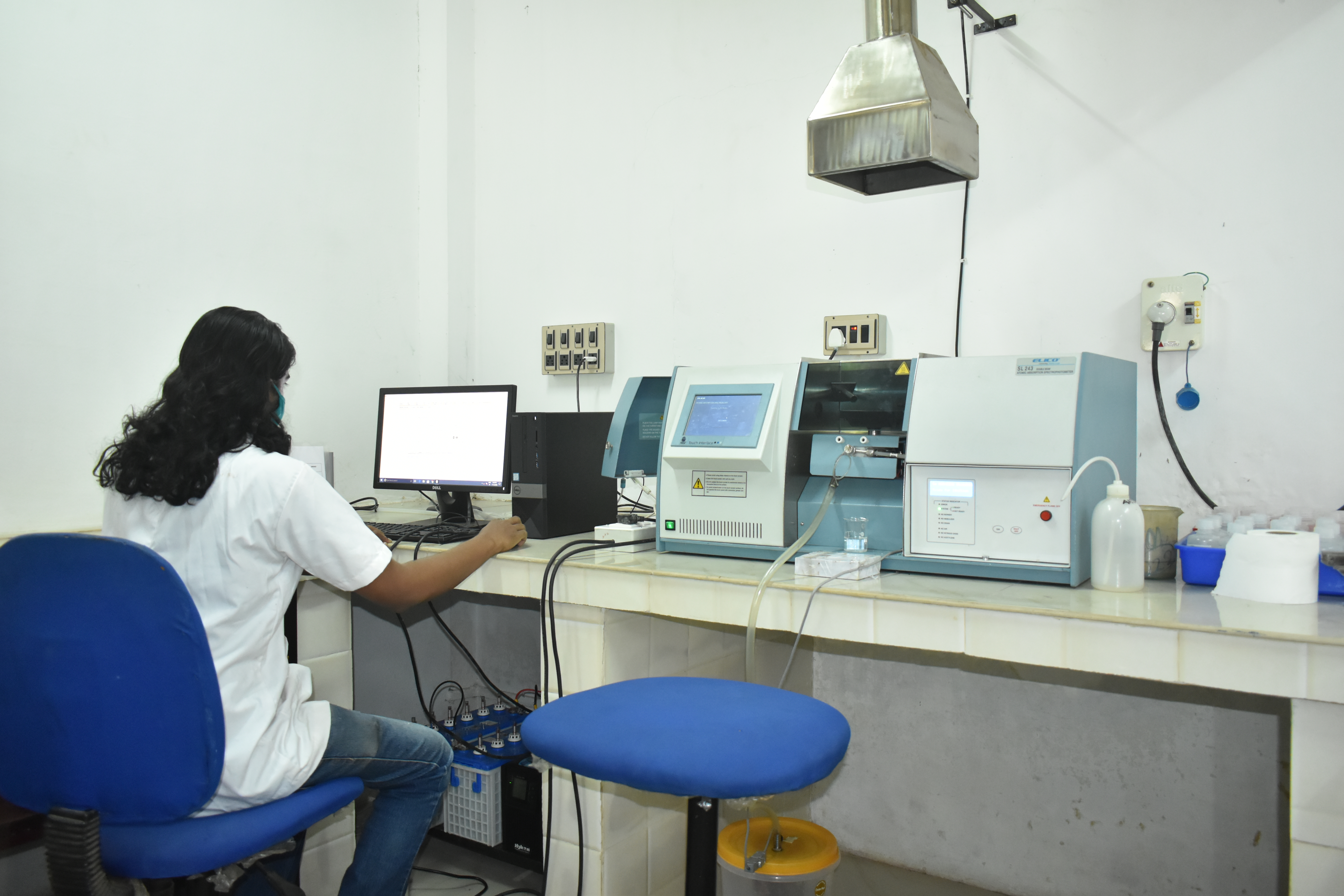
AAS in Laboratory

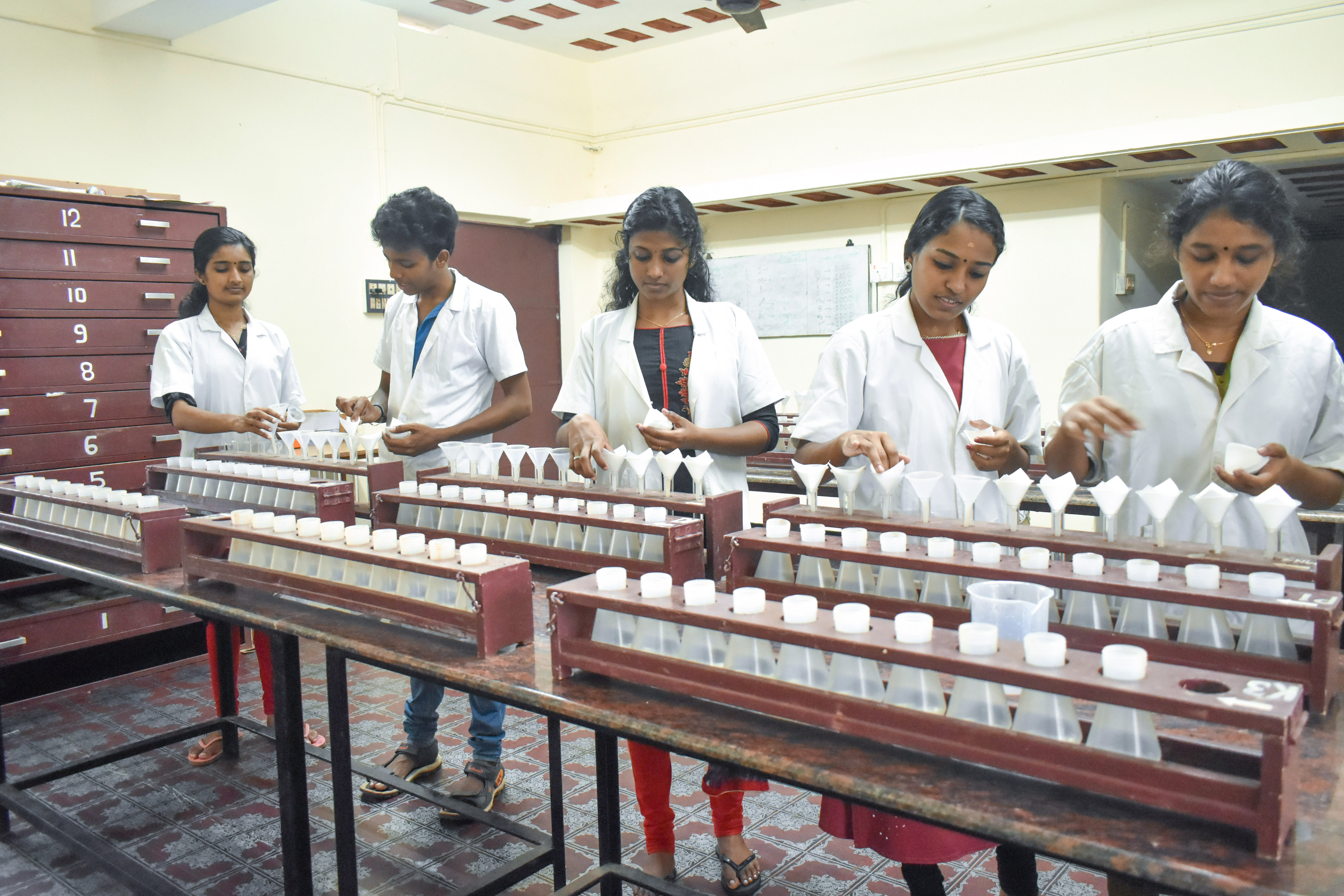
Soil testing laboratory
