= Zoo Road =

Locality in Guwahati, India

Coordinates: 26°16′N 91°7′E

Zoo Road is a locality in central part of Guwahati surrounded by Chandmari and AIDC localities.

== See also ==
- Pan Bazaar
- Paltan Bazaar
- Beltola

From Chandmari to Ganeshguri, the road is known as Zoo Road, because the road is connected to Assam State Zoo.
