= Palakkuzhi =

- Village
- Interactive map of Palakkuzhi
- Coordinates: 10.507°N 76.476°E
- Country: India
- State: Kerala
- District: Palakkad

Languages
  - Official: Malayalam, English
- Time zone: UTC+5:30 (IST)
- PIN: 678684
- Telephone code: 91 4922
- Vehicle registration: KL-9, KL-49
- Nearest city: Vadakkencherry (15 km away); Palakkad (45 km away)
- Lok Sabha constituency: Alathur
- Vidhan Sabha constituency: Tharoor

Palakkuzhi is a village in Alathur taluk of Palakkad district, Kerala State. Vadakkenchery is the nearest town and is 14 km away from here.

== Tourism Attraction ==
Thindillam waterfalls is a major people attraction spot. The village is covered by lush green hill slopes of pepper and rubber plantations. This place rubs border with the Peechi Wildlife sanctuary

== Hydel Power plan ==
The Palakkad district panchayat has begun efforts to establish a power project at the Thindillam waterfalls at Palakkuzhi. Four acres would be acquired for the project and the project aims to generate 3.78 MW at the initial stage and the panchayat would sell the generated power to Kerala State Electricity Board

== Transportation ==
Kerala State Road Transport Corporation has few schedules to Palakkuzhi and there are other Private operators too.

St. Thomas Church, Palakkuzhi is located here

This town connects to other parts of India through Palakkad city. National Highway No.544 connects to Coimbatore and Bangalore. Other parts of Kerala is accessed through National Highway No.66 going through Thrissur. Calicut International Airport, Cochin International Airport and Coimbatore Airport are the nearest airports. Shoranur Junction railway station is the nearest major railway station.
