= Malabar Botanical Garden and Institute for Plant Sciences =

Indian botanical garden

- Interactive map of Malabar Botanical Garden and Institute for Plant Sciences
- Location: Kozhikode, Kerala India
- Coordinates: 11°14′15″N 75°49′39″E
- Area: 45 acres (18 ha)
- Website: mbgips.in

Malabar Botanical Garden and Institute of Plant Sciences (MBGIPS) is a botanical garden located in Olavanna Grampanchayat, Kozhikode District, Kerala, India. Considering aquatic plant species, it is one of the leading botanical gardens in India. The botanical garden is a member of the Botanic Gardens Conservation International and has international agenda registration. The Ministry of Environment, Forest and Climate Change (MoEFCC), Govt. of India has approved MBGIPS as a “Lead Botanic Garden” in the conservation of aquatic plants. In 2015, the institute became a research institute under the Kerala State Council for Science, Technology and Environment (KSCSTE). It is also the accredited research center of the University of Calicut and the Regional Centre of Expertise in Sustainable education of United Nations University, Japan.

Of the 742 species mentioned in van Rheede's Hortus Malabaricus, 432 are bred here. Many rare endangered aquatic plants, 150 species of pteridophytes, more than 60 species of bryophytes, 52 species of fruit trees, 60 species of aromatic plants and many medicinal plants are protected in the botanical garden. It is home to more than 400 Indian aquatic plants, and is the largest collection in the country in this category.

== History ==
The institution started as a Govt. Botanical Garden in 1991, and later in 1996 it was upgraded as Malabar Botanical Society, an autonomous body with a government grant. In 2015, the institute became a research institute under the Kerala State Council for Science Technology and Environment.

== Development ==
A new Block for Advanced Research, Guest House Complex and Aquatic Biopark are under construction at Malabar Botanical Garden.

== Approach ==
The 45 acres (18 ha) botanical garden is located at a distance of 8 km from the city of Kozhikode. The Botanical Garden is located at a distance of 8 km from the Kozhikode Railway Station and 25 km from the Kozhikode International Airport. The park is open to the public from 10 a.m. to 5 p.m. on government working days.

== Awards ==
- 2014: Leadership Award from the National Academy of Biological Sciences

== See also ==
- List of botanical gardens in India
