= Kerala Science Congress =

Annual gathering of Keralite scientists

- Venue: Government Brennen College, Thalassery, Kannur
- Organised by: KSCSTE, Kerala

Kerala Science Congress is an annual gathering of Kerala-based scientists and scholars organised by Kerala State Council for Science, Technology and Environment (KSCSTE) for revitalizing Research and Development activities in Kerala and to identify new talents in scientific research in Kerala. KSCSTE is an autonomous body constituted by the Government of Kerala. The gathering features talks by invited scientists, presentations of research papers and awards of various prizes.

The first Congress was held 26–28 February 1989 in Cochin University of Science and Technology with the focal theme "natural resources and industrial development of Kerala." The 29th Congress held in Mar Thoma College, Tiruvalla during 28–30 January 2017. The focal theme is Genomics in Health and Disease. The special theme "Ecology and Environment". The 30th Science Congress held in Brennan College, Thalasseri during 28–30 January 2018.

== History ==
The silver jubilee edition of the Kerala Science Congress was held in Thiruvananthapuram, during 29 January - 2 February 2013. A highlight of the event was a special session on science education in Malayalam jointly organized by Kerala State Council for Science, Technology and Environment and Thunchath Ezhuthachan Malayalam University. A draft of the Kerala Science Policy, formulated on the lines of National Science, Technology and Innovation Policy, was unveiled by Oommen Chandy, Chief Minister of Kerala, during the silver jubilee edition of the Kerala Science Congress.

The 26th edition of the event was held during 28 − 31 January 2014 at Kalpetta in Wayanad District in Kerala with the special theme "traditional knowledge." It was opened on 28 January 2014, by State Chief Minister, at the Kerala Veterinary and Animal Sciences University campus, Pookode near Kalpetta. The four-day congress was held at six venues on the university campus, and was attended by around 1,850 delegates from across India.

The chief minister of Kerala, Oommen Chandy inaugurated the 27th Kerala Science Congress organised by the Kerala State Council for Science, Technology and Environment (KSCSTE) in Alappuzha on 27 January 2015. The focal theme of the 27th Kerala Science Congress was "Traditional Industries". The three-day conference was chaired by India’s "Agni Puthri" Dr. Tessy Thomas. A special session on ‘Traditional Industries’ was held to evolve strategies for reviving the traditional industrial sector in Kerala. About 980 delegates had registered for the event.

28th Kerala Science Congress

The 28th Kerala Science Congress was held in Calicut university campus during 28–30 January 2016. Chief Minister Oommen Chandy inaugurated the congress which presided by Shri. K N A Khader MLA. Eminent Scientist Prof M S Swaminathan was the chairman of 28th Kerala Science Congress. Dr. Suresh Das, was president of the Kerala Science Congress Dr. P. Harinarayanan, Senior Scientist KSCSTE was general convenor. CWRDM hosted the 28th KSC at Calicut University campus and Dr Narasimha Prasad Director CWRDM was the chairman of the organizing committee. Dr Sammer Bramachari former director general CSIR, Prof Ajit K Kembhavi, Dr Anil Kakodkar, prof Santanu Bhattachraya, Prof Prabhat Rajan, Dr Savithri Preetha Nair, Dr R D Singh, Prof Eldho T I, Dr Jose Kallarachal, Prof. GSLHV Prasad Rao, Dr E J Joseph, Dr. CTS Nair, Prof K V Peter, Dr. P S Easa, Dr N. Sasidharan, Prof. K P. Gopinathan, Dr Sunil K Narayan, Dr K K Ramachandran were key speakers. around 1500 delegates including child scientists participated in the three day event. The focal of the 28th Edition of KSC was Climate Change and its impact on water resource of Kerala. Special Theme sessions - Malabar summit focussing on the Biodiversity and Spices of Malabar, Assistive technology for the differently abled and International Year of pulses. 302 papers out of 367 papers selected were presented during the technical session.

Six memorial lectures were held to commemorate S&T visionaries during the Science Congress. Dr. P. K.Iyengar memorial lecture by Dr Anil Kakodkar, former chairman, Atomic Energy Commission and secretary to the Government of India, Department of Atomic Energy. Dr P. R. Pisharoty Memorial Lecture - Prof. Ajit K Kembhavi, former director and Distinguished Professor at the Inter-University Centre for Astronomy and Astrophysics (IUCAA) Pune. Dr Janaki Ammal Memorial lecture by Dr Savithri Preetha Nair - Visiting Fellow at the Centre for Contemporary Studies, Indian Institute for science, Bangalore, P K Gopalakrishnan Memorial Lecture by Dr Prabhat Ranjan, executive director, TIFAC, DST and Dr G N Ramachandran Memorial Lecture by Professor Samir K Brahmachari, former director general Council of Scientific and Industrial Research (CSIR), and secretary, Department of Scientific and Industrial Research, Government of India.

PG students interactive session with eminent scientists, Children's Science Congress, National Science exhibition and special session on Science of Aging were other activities during the three day event of 28th KSC.

29th Kerala Science Congress

The 29th session of Kerala Science Congress was held at MarThoma College, Thiruvalla, Pathanamthitta, Kerala from 28 to 30 January 2017. The event was inaugurated by the Hon. Chief Minister and president of the KSCSTE, Shri. Pinarayi Vijayan on 28 January 2017 at 10.00 am. The inaugural session was presided by Shri. Matheew T. Thomas, Hon’ble Minister for Water Resources, Govt of Kerala. Bharat Ratna Dr.C.N.R. Rao, delivered the Keynote address.Shri. Anto Antony, Member of Parliament, Dr. K. P. Gopinathan, chairman, 29th Science Congress, Dr. S. Pradeep Kumar, Member Secretary, KSCSTE and Dr k. Vijaykumar, general convenor 29th KSC spoke during the inaugural session. The focal theme of this science congress session was "Genomics in Health & Disease.". Dr.Partha P. Majumder, director, National Institute of Biomedical Genomics, Dr. K. Thankaraj, Senior Principal Scientist, CCMB, Hyderabad were the speakers in this session. A special theme session on "Ecology & Environment" was oragisned. Dr. M. K. Prasad, Prof. Madhav Gadgil, Prof. Raghavendra Gadagkar, Prof. R. Sukumar were the key speakers in the session. Memorial Lectures on Dr. P. R. Pisharoty was delivered by Dr. M. Rajeevan, Secretary MoES, Dr. E. K. Janakiammal by Dr. Ramesh V. Sonti, chief scientist, CCMB, Hyderabad, Dr. G. N. Ramachandran by Dr. T. P. Singh, professor, AIIMS, New Delhi and Dr. P. K. Iyengar by Dr. Milan K. Sanyal, former director, Saha Institute of Nuclear Physics.

432 papers were presented under 12 streams during the congress. PG students interactive session, Children's Science Congress and National Science exhibition were other highlights of 29th KSC.

30th Kerala Science Congress

The 30th session was held at Government Brennen College, Thalassery, Kannur from 28 to 30 January 2018 and inaugurated by Chief Minister Shri. Pinaray Vijayan in a programme presided by Dr.Suresh Das, Executive Vice President, KSCSTE. Dr. A. S. Kiran Kumar, former chairman, ISRO, delivered the Keynote address. Focal theme was "Viruses and Infectious Diseases. "Dr, T. J. John, CMC, Vellore; Dr. S. Vijaya, professor, IISc., Bangalore and Dr. Anmol Chandele, Group Leader, ICGEB-EMORY Vaccine Program ICGEB, New Delhi were the speakers in this session.

Memorial lectures to honour the S&T visionaries and to cherish their contributions were presented during this Science Congress session. Dr. G. N. Ramachandran Memorial Lecture was delivered by Dr. Manju Banzal, Dr. E. K. Janakiammal Lecture by Dr. Paramjit Singh, Shri. P. T. Bhaskara Panicker lecture by Prof. R. V. G. Menon, and Dr. P. K Gopalakrishnan Lecture by Shri. S. M. Vijayanand. 424 papers were presented during the congress under 12 subjects areas. PG students interactive session, Children's Science Congress and National Science exhibition were other highlights of 30th KSC.

== Overview ==
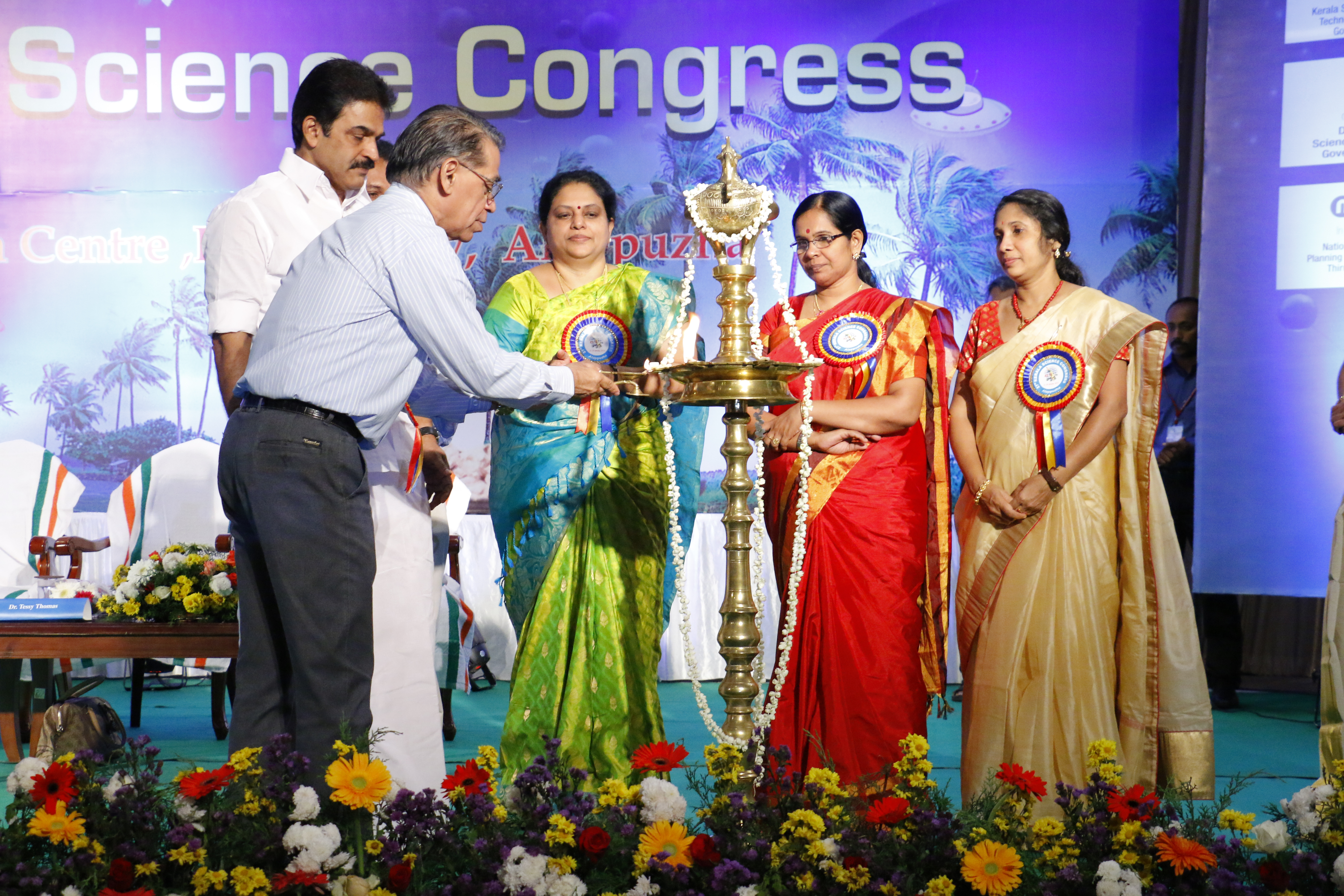
Dr T Ramaswamy, former secretary, Department of Science and Technology, Govt. of India lighting the lamp during the inaugural session of 27th Kerala Science Congress

During the Congress carefully selected young researchers are conferred the Kerala State Young Scientist Award for research excellence in various disciplines like mathematical sciences, health sciences, agricultural sciences and forestry, etc. Each awardee is presented with a medal, a certificate with citation, a cash prize of Rs.50,000, a startup research grant, and travel support for a trip abroad to present the research work at a conference. A maximum of 14 awards are conferred every year. The awards are given to young researchers of Indian origin with Ph.D working in Kerala for the last three years. The awardees will make a 15-minute presentation of their award-winning work at the plenary session of the Kerala Science Congress.

During the 26th meeting of the Congress the Award was presented to only three persons, namely, Ravi Shankar L (Scientist, Agroprocessing and Natural Products Division NIIST, CSIR, Pappanamcode, Thiruvananthapuram), Mahesh Hariharan (assistant professor, School of Chemistry, IISER, Thiruvananthapuram) and Vineeth Chandrasekharan Nair (Scientist SD, Space Physics Laboratory, VSSC, ISRO, Thiruvananthapuram). During 27th Congress eight young scientists from different branches of science have been presented the Young Scientist Award for the year 2014. The awardees include Utpal Manna, School of Mathematics, Indian Institute of Science Education and Research (IISER), Thiruvananthapuram; Rajeev N. Kini, School of Physics, IISER; Reji Varghese, School of Chemistry, IISER; K.N. Uma, Space Physics Laboratory, VSSC; N. Selvaraju, Department of Chemical Engineering, National Institute of Technology, Calicut; Santhoshkumar K.S., Polymers and Special Chemicals Division, VSSC; Binod Parameswaran, Biotechnology Division, CSIR- NIIST, Thiruvananthapuram; and Vandana Sankar, Agro-processing and Natural Products Division, CSIR-NIIST.

A special session called Children's Science Congress used to be held as part of the deliberations of Kerala Science Congress to promote children's endeavors in science. Awards are also presented for authors of best research papers. There are memorial lectures in honour of P.K. Iyengar, nuclear physicist, G.N. Ramachandran, physicist, E.K. Janaki Ammal, botanist, P.T. Bhaskara Panicker, social activist and writer, P.K. Gopalakrishnan, sociologist and economist, and P.R. Pisharoty, physicist and meteorologist.
