= Padmapuram Gardens =

Padmapuram Gardens is a tourist attraction in the Araku valley in Andhra Pradesh, India.

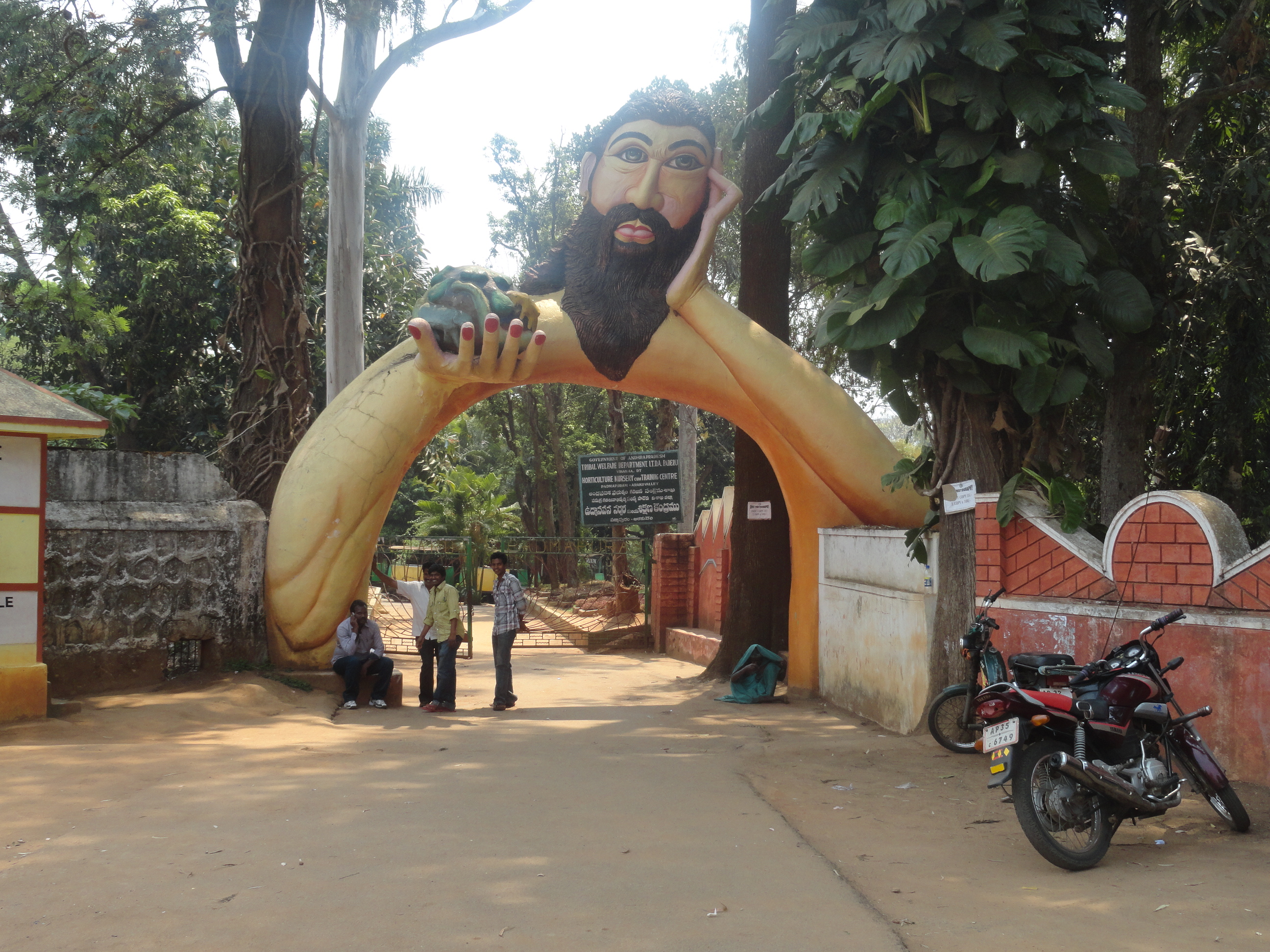
Entrance at Padmapuram gardens

== Location ==
The famed Padmapuram gardens are located in the beautiful and serene valley Araku. It is a short drive away from the railway station.
