= Rajiv Gandhi Cancer Institute and Research Centre =

Private Hospital in India

- Location of the Rohini campus of the hospital in New Delhi

Geography
- Location: Rohini and Niti bagh, New Delhi, Delhi, India
- Coordinates: 28.716472°N 77.110887°E

Organisation
- Type: Specialised
- Network: Indraprastha Cancer Society and Research Centre

Services
- Standards: International
- Emergency department: Yes
- Beds: 500 Plus (Rohini), 30 (Nitibagh)

History
- Founded: 1 July 1996

Links
- Website: www.rgcirc.org

Rajiv Gandhi Cancer Institute and Research Centre (RGCIRC) is a non-profit medical facility and research institute based in Delhi, India specialising in cancer treatment and research. It is one of the largest medical centers for cancer treatment in Asia. RGCIRC is a project of Indraprastha Cancer Society and Research Centre, a not-for-profit public society. The institute was founded in 1996.

== History and overview ==
Indraprastha Cancer Society and Research Centre is a not for profit public medical society. It was formed in the year 1994 under the Societies Registration Act, 1860. The Institute started functioning on 1 July 1996 when a soft opening was done by Sonia Gandhi. However, it was formally inaugurated by the then, President of India, Shankar Dayal Sharma, in the presence of Sonia Gandhi and others on 20 August 1996. It started as a 152 bedded hospital, and currently it's a 500 Plus bedded hospital. The institute diagnoses and treats around 60,000 patients per year. Since its establishment, the institute has provided services to over two hundred thousand patients from India, Nepal, Bangladesh, Sri Lanka, and other countries. The Institute is ISO:9001 and ISO:14001 certified. In February 2013, the institute introduced electrical technology as a service called 'NanoKnife', a minimally invasive cancer treatment. On 12 October 2016, a new cancer center was established in NitiBagh, South Delhi by the institute.

== Facilities ==
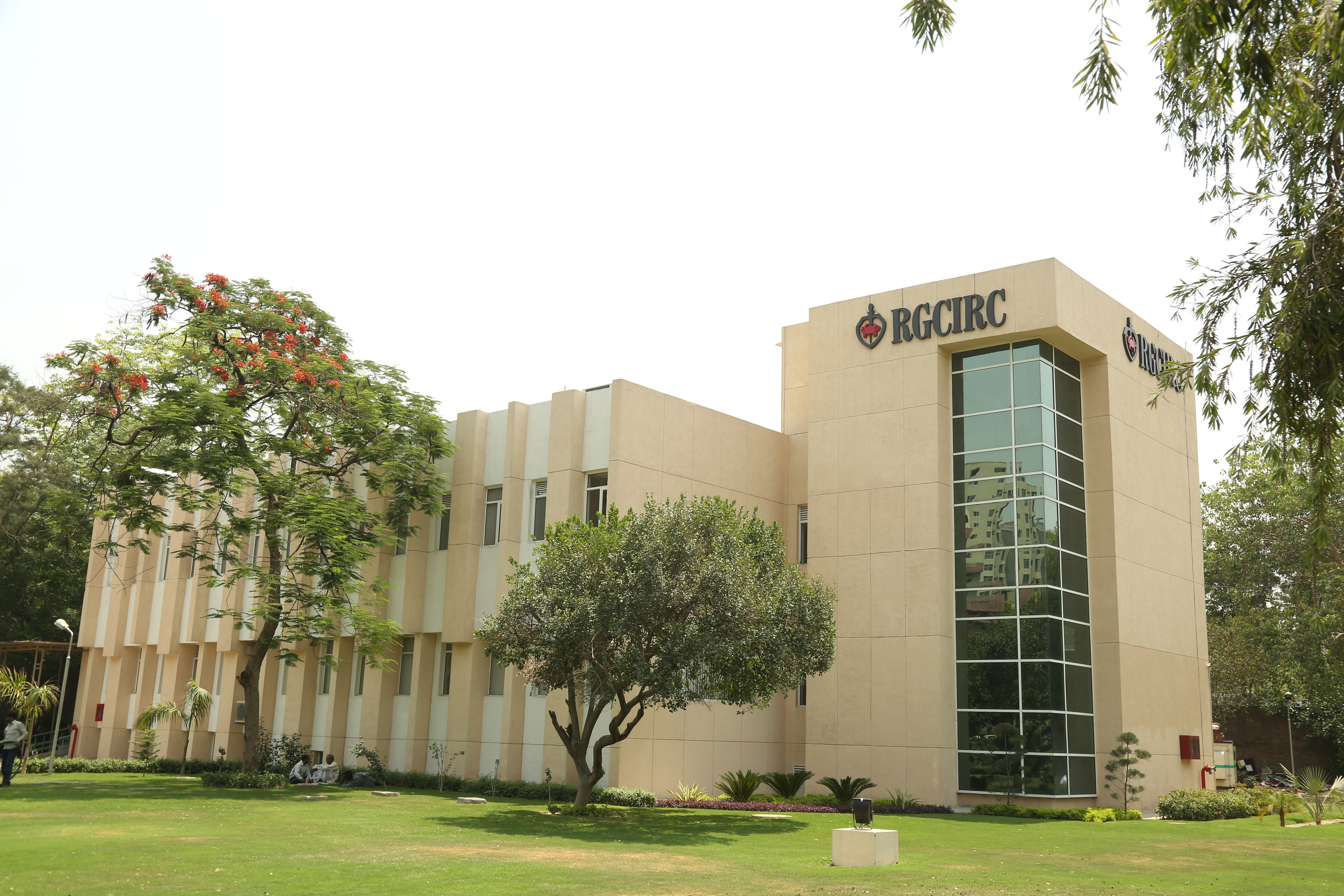
NItibagh campus of RGCIRC

The medical centre is spread around two hundred thousand square feet area, with a bed capacity of 500. The 57 consultation rooms are spread on three floors of the institute. It has 14 state-of-the-art modular Operation Theatres with three stage air filtration and gas scavenging systems, and 2 Minor Operation Theatres for Day Care Surgeries. The Surgical ICU is 51 bedded and Medical ICU is 21 bedded. The institute has Leukemia ward, Thyroid Ward, Bone Marrow Transplant unit, MUD transplant unit, and stem cell transplant unit. It has facilities of Renal Replacement therapies and various endoscopies.

=== Departments ===
- Department of Surgical Oncology
- Department of Radiology and Imaging
- Department of Medical Oncology
- Department of Pediatric Hematology Oncology
- Department of Radiation Oncology
- Department of Nuclear Medicine
- Department of Pathology and Transfusion Services
- Department of Stem Cell and Bone Marrow Transplantation
- Department of Anesthesiology

=== Other services ===
- Telemedicine
- Pharmacy services
- Preventive services
- Physiotherapy services
- Palliative/Home care services
- Day care services
- Emergency services
- Counseling services
- Multispecialty Clinic / Tumor Board

== Affiliation and recognition ==
Organization	Affiliation	Year
National Accreditation Board for Hospitals & Healthcare Providers(NABH)	Accreditation	2015
National Accreditation Board for Testing and Calibration Laboratories (NABL)	Accreditation	2009
NABH Digital Health Accreditation (NABH-DHS)	Accreditation	2024
NABH-Ethics Committee	Accreditation	2019
Union for International Cancer Control	Membership	2005
Nursing Excellence by NABH	Certification	2016
Certified ISO 9001	Accreditation	2007
Certified ISO 14001	Accreditation	2007
Green OT	Recognition	2016
NABH (Blood Bank)	Recognition	2013

== Academics and research ==
Besides patients care, the institute also studies and undertakes scientific research on the aspects of cancer and in particular to investigate its incidence, prevalence, distribution, cause, symptoms and to promote its prevention and provides cure. The institute has partnership with Thomas Jefferson University.

- One-year fellowship courses which are recognized by Indian Medical Association- Academy of Medical Specialties, Hyderabad. Admissions are done in October and January.
- The institute also conducts short duration fellowship programme in Oncological Radiology sponsored by International Atomic Energy Agency (IAEA), Vienna Europe.
- It also provides Diplomate of National Board (DNB) courses which are recognized by National Board of Examination, Ministry of Health and Family Welfare Govt of India.
- Other courses include B.Sc. in Medical Technology, Nursing Aide Course and Oncology Nursing Course.
