= Jawaharlal Nehru Tropical Botanic Garden and Research Institute =

Botany research institute in India

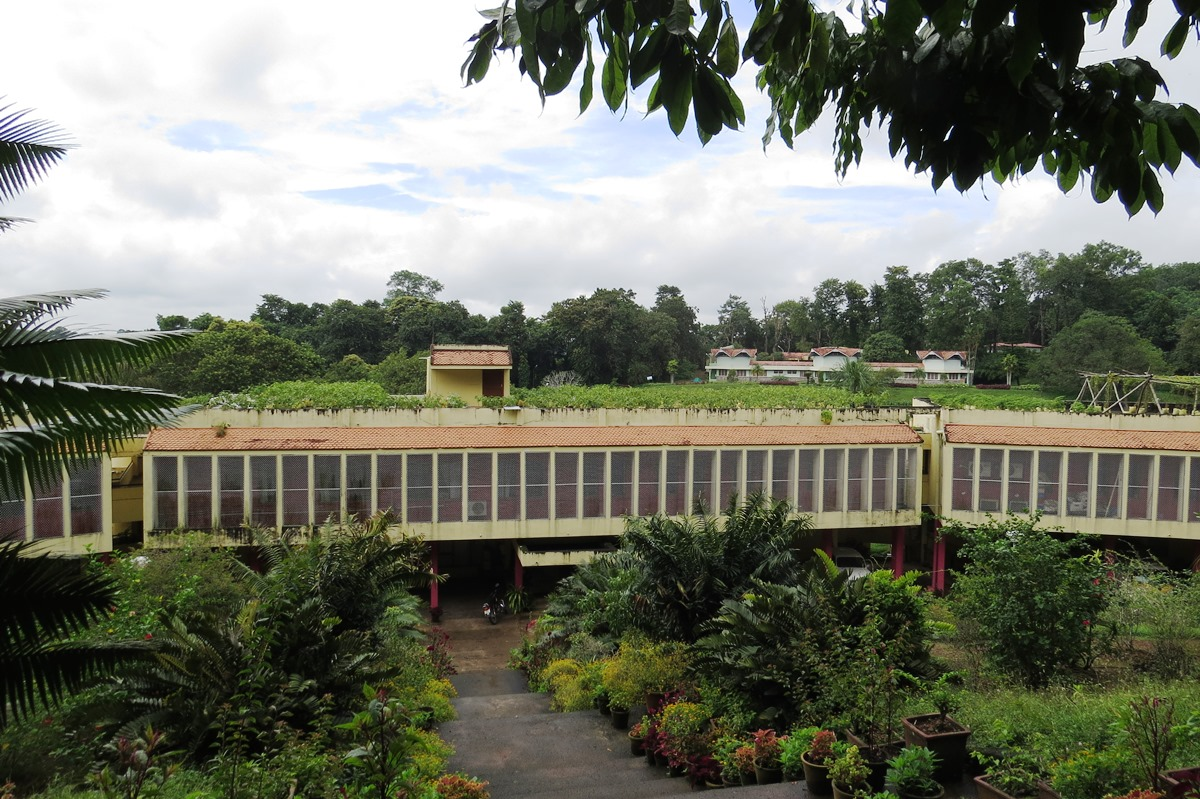
Jawaharlal Nehru Tropical Botanic Garden and Research Institute, Palode, Thiruvananthapuram

Jawaharlal Nehru Tropical Botanic Garden and Research Institute, formerly Tropical Botanic Garden and Research Institute, is an autonomous Institute established by the Government of Kerala on 17 November 1979 at Thiruvananthapuram, the capital city of Kerala. It functions under the umbrella of the Kerala State Council for Science, Technology and Environment (KSCSTE), Government of Kerala.
