= Kerala School of Mathematics, Kozhikode =

Research Centre in Kerala, India

Kerala School of Mathematics
- Established: 2009
- Director: Ratnakumar P K
- Location: Kozhikode, Kerala, India; 11.2868°N 75.8715°E
- Language: English
- Website: http://ksom.res.in/

The Kerala School of Mathematics (KSoM) in Kozhikode, India is a research institute in Theoretical sciences with a focus on Mathematics. The institute is a joint venture of the Department of Atomic Energy (DAE) and the Science & Technology Department, Government of Kerala. Kerala School of Mathematics is a center of advanced research and learning in Mathematics and is a meeting ground for leading Mathematicians from around the world.

Kerala School of Mathematics has a doctoral program to which students are admitted on a yearly basis. The institute also has an Integrated MSc-PhD program with an option for students to exit the program with an MSc degree at the end of two years.

== History ==
Mathematics in Kerala, during the times of Madhava of Sangamagrama, majorly flourished in the Muziris region of Thrikkandiyur, Thirur, Alattiyur, and Tirunavaya in the Malabar region of Kerala. Kerala school of astronomy and mathematics flourished between the 14th and 16th centuries. Commemorating the rich heritage of Mathematics in the region, Kerala School of Mathematics was hence chosen to be set up in the scenic mountains of the Western Ghats in the city of Kozhikode.

The nascent plan to set up Kerala School of Mathematics started forming shape in around 2004. The then DAE chairman Anil Kakodkar and the then executive vice president of KSCSTE, M. S. Valiathan were instrumental in setting up the institute with the guidance of M. S. Raghunathan, Rajeeva Karandikar and Alladi Sitaram. The foundation stone of KSoM was laid by the then Chief Minister A.K. Antony in 2004. The institute was later inaugurated in 2008 by the then Chief Minister V. S. Achuthanandan and finally set up in 2009 with Parameswaran A. J. as the founding director.
