= Panamaram =

Town in Kerala, India

- Village
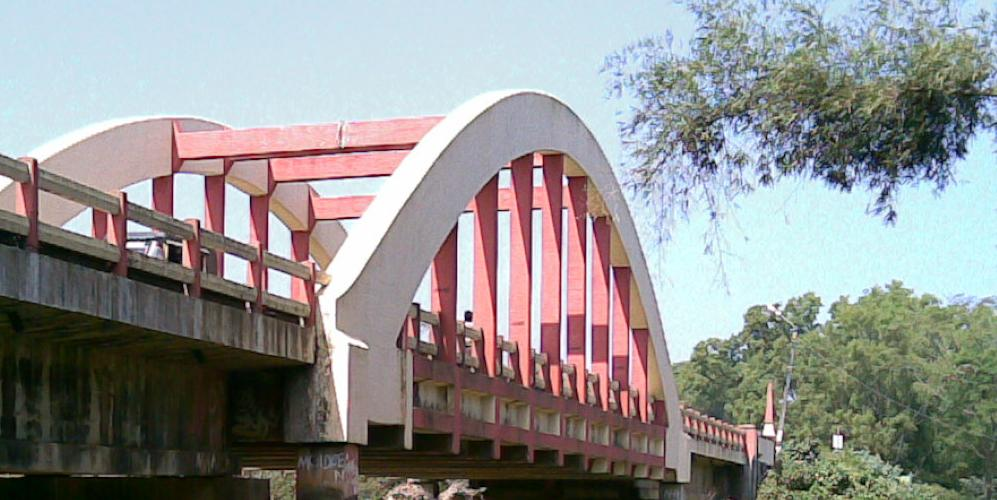
- Panamaram Bridge

- Location in Kerala, India Panamaram (India)
- Coordinates: 11.739°N 76.073°E
- Country: India
- State: Kerala
- District: Wayanad

Population (2011)
  - Total: 12,683

Languages
  - Official: Malayalam, English
- Time zone: UTC+5:30 (IST)
- PIN: 670721
- ISO 3166 code: IN-KL
- Vehicle registration: KL 12

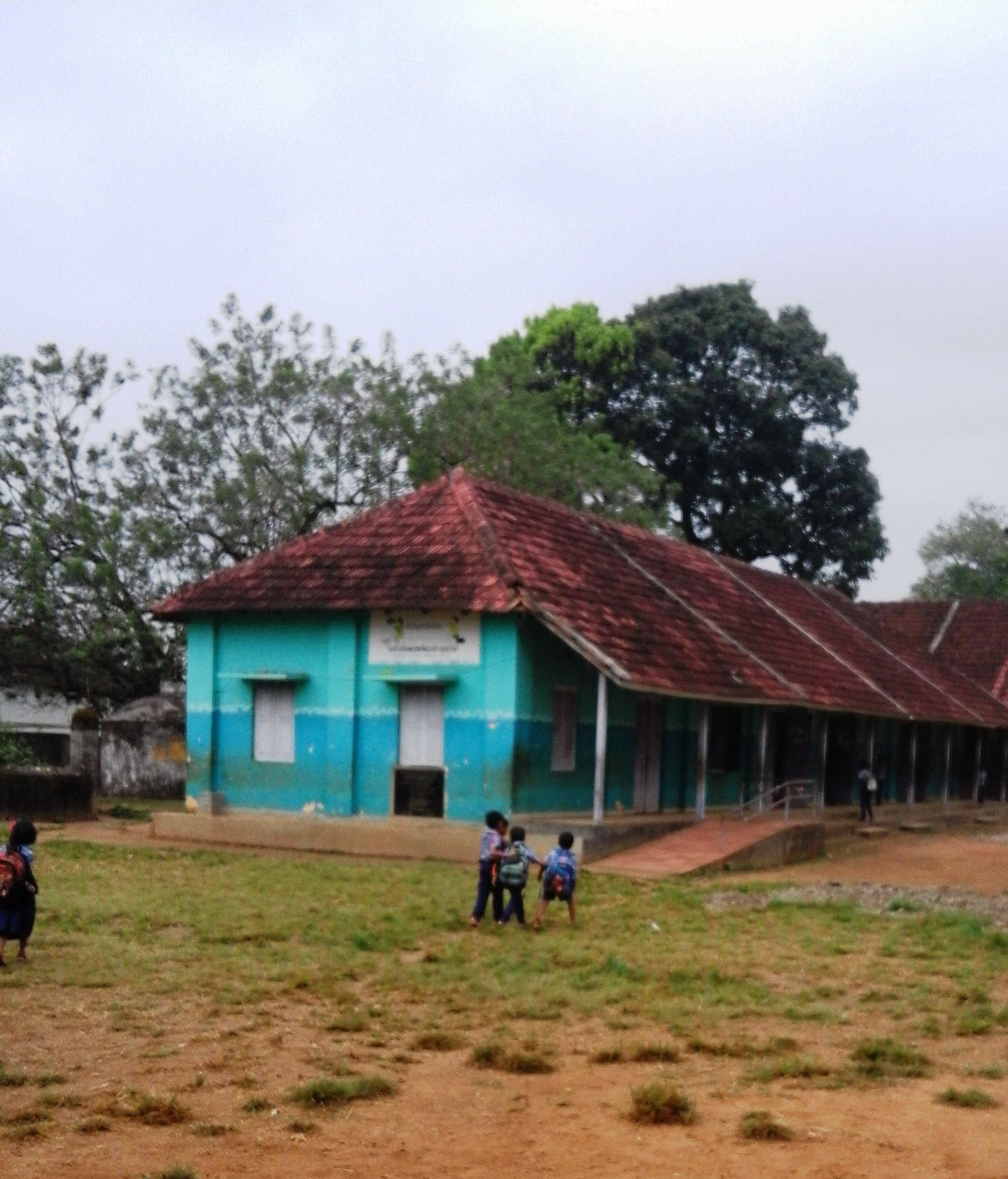
Panchayath School, Panamaram

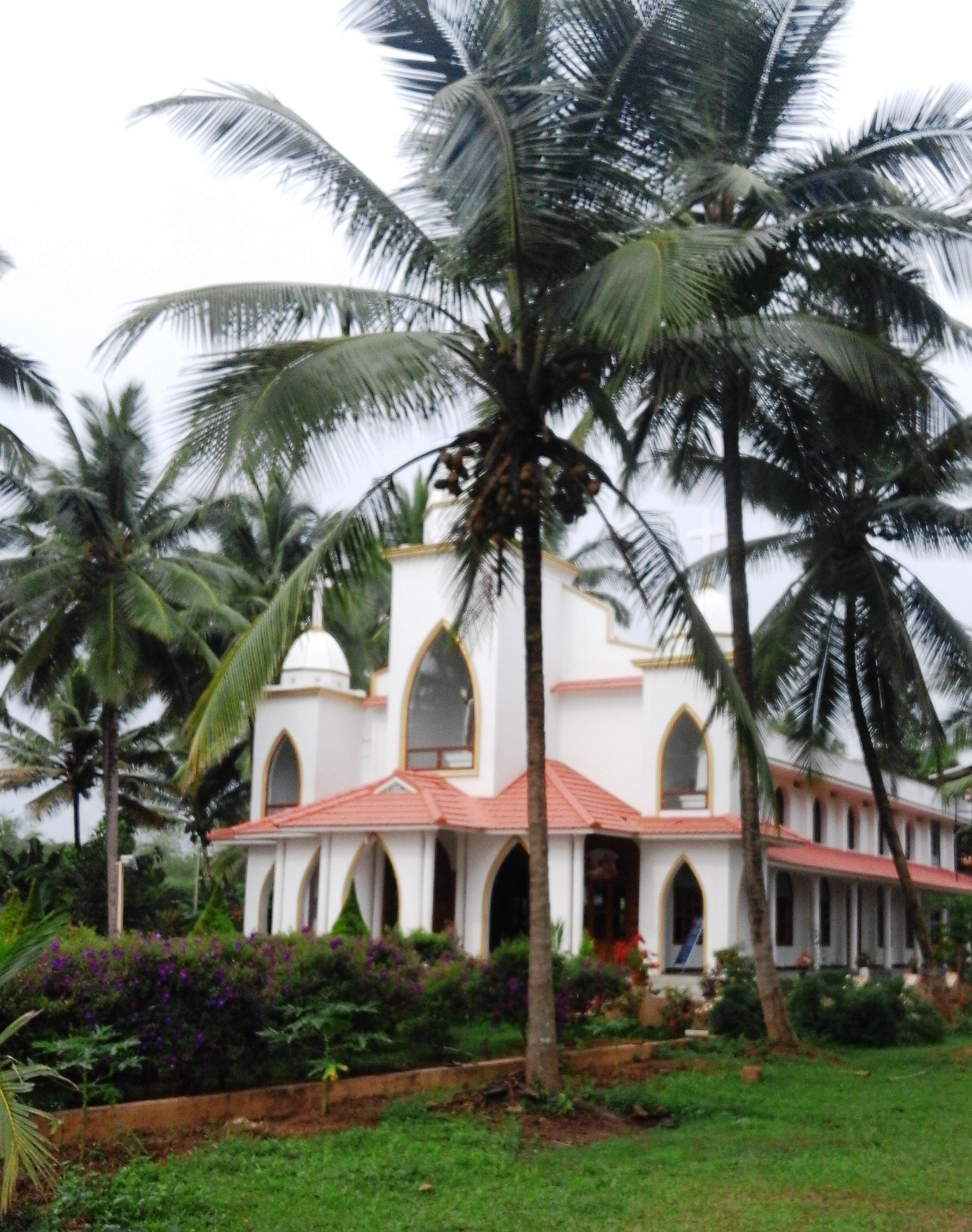
Padre Church

Panamaram is a town, village in Wayanad district in the state of Kerala, India.

== Demographics ==
As of 2011 India census, Panamaram had a population of 12683 with 6219 males and 6464 females.

== Panamaram Fort ==
In one of the first freedom struggles in South India
On 11 October 1802 Pazhassi Raja's followers including Thalakkal Chanthu and Edachena Kunkan Nair captured the Panamaram Fort which was manned by the infantry units of Bombay. The captain on command, a lieutenant, and 25 other soldiers were killed in the battle.

== Herons ==
According to the annual heronry count of the Malabar Natural History Society (MNHS), the Panamaram heronry is the largest heronry in Malabar in terms of number and diversity of birds breeding there. It is a small (1 acre) island in the river Kabani, an elevated sand bank. The government has issued orders to take apt measures to conserve the Panamaram Heronry. The massive destruction of bamboo groves on the heronry and unbridled sand mining are the two vital issues the heronry is facing. It has been observed that many birds of foreign origin also migrate to Panamaram during the nestling season. The cattle egret (Bubulcus ibis) was also observed breeding here in 2010; the breeding of the bird is reported in the state after 62 years. Other main species are little egret, Ardeola (pond heron), night heron, intermediate egret, purple heron, and black-headed ibis.

== See also ==
- Mananthavady
- Padinjarathara
- Nadavayal
- Thondernad
- Vellamunda
- Nalloornad
- Payyampally
- Thavinjal
- Vimalanager
- Anjukunnu
- Tharuvana
- Kallody
- Oorpally
- Valat
- Thrissilery
- Kayakkunn
