= Thondernad =

- village
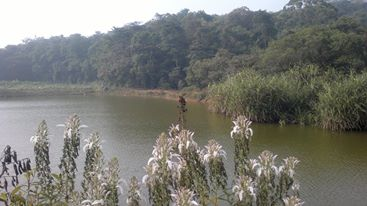
- Kunkichira, Kunhome

- Location in Kerala, India Thondernad (India)
- Coordinates: 11°46′27″N 75°50′13″E
- Country: India
- State: Kerala
- District: Wayanad

Population (2011)
  - Total: 11,752

Languages
  - Official: Malayalam, English
- Time zone: UTC+5:30 (IST)
- PIN: 670731
- ISO 3166 code: IN-KL
- Vehicle registration: KL-12, kl-72

Thondernad is a village in Wayanad district in the state of Kerala, India.

== Demographics ==
As per the 2011 Census of India, Thondernad had a total population of 11,752 people living in 2,652 households. Of the total population, 5,882 were male and 5,870 were female. The population of children in the age group 0–6 years was 1,566 (811 males and 755 females).

The sex ratio is 998 females per 1,000 males, lower than the Kerala state average of 1,084. The child sex ratio (0–6 years) is 931, compared to the state average of 964.

The literacy rate in Thondernad is 86.02%, with male literacy at 91.03% and female literacy at 81.06%, higher than the national average.

Thondernad has a significant tribal population. Scheduled Tribes constitute 26.39% (3,101 individuals), while Scheduled Castes make up 1.83% (215 individuals) of the total population.

== Villages ==
- Mananthavady
- Vellamunda
- Nalloornad
- Payyampally
- Thavinjal
- Vimalanager
- Anjukunnu
- Panamaram
- Tharuvana
- Kallody
- Oorpally
- Valat
- Thrissilery
