= Nalloornad =

- village
- Country: India
- State: Kerala
- District: Wayanad

Population (2011)
  - Total: 16,928

Languages
  - Official: Malayalam, English
- Time zone: UTC+5:30 (IST)
- PIN: 670645
- ISO 3166 code: IN-KL
- Vehicle registration: KL-72

Nalloornad is a village in Mananthavady in Wayanad district in the state of Kerala, India.

== Demographics ==
As of 2011 India census, Nalloornad had a population of 16928 with 8557 males and 8371 females.

== See also ==
- Mananthavady
- Thondernad
- Vellamunda
- Payyampally
- Thavinjal
- Vimalanager
- Anjukunnu
- Panamaram
- Tharuvana
- Kallody
- Oorpally
- Valat
- Thrissilery
