= Payyampally =

Town in Kerala, India

- town
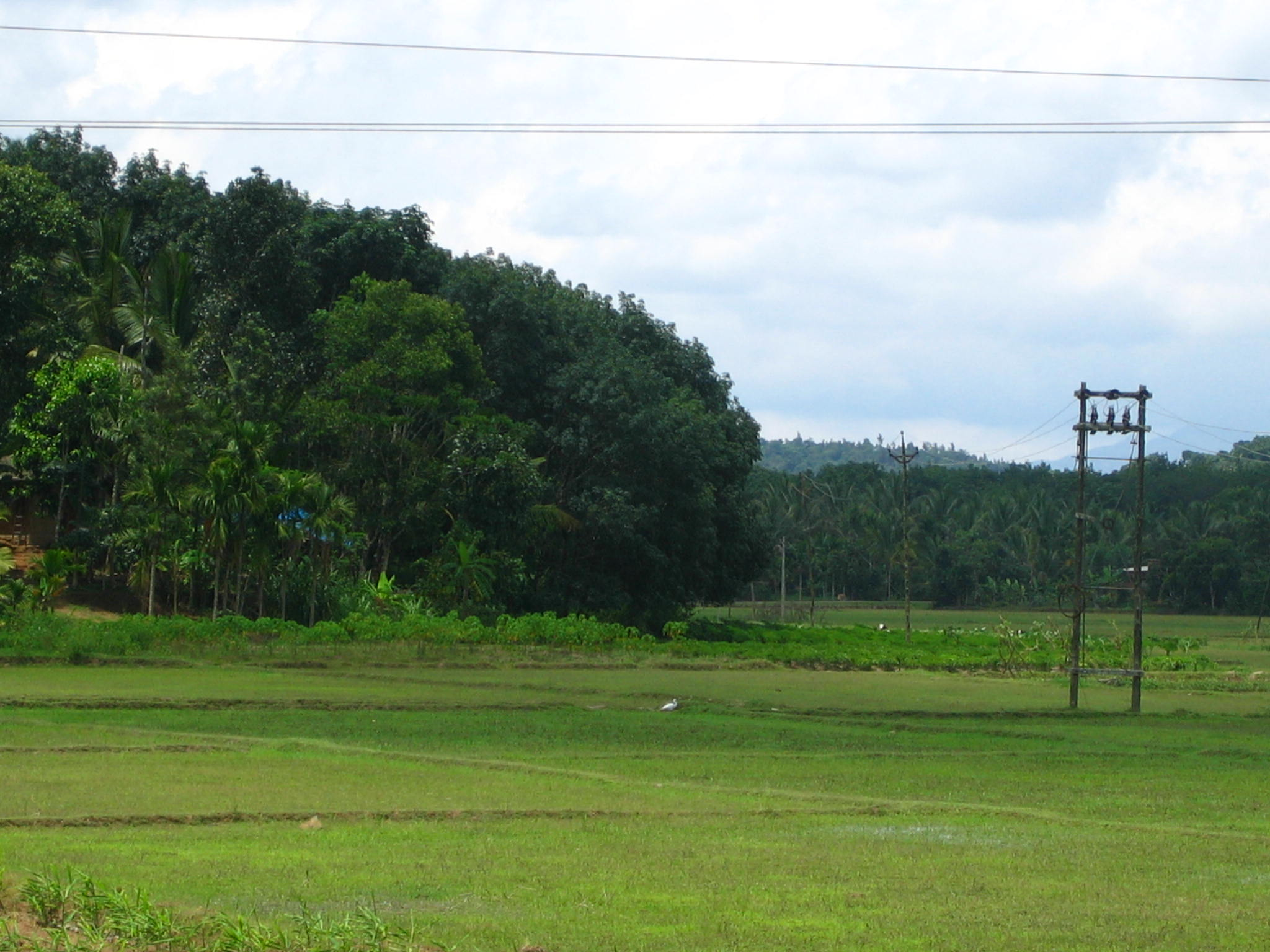
- Oorpally, Payyampally

- Location in Kerala, India Payyampally (India)
- Coordinates: 11°48′40″N 76°3′20″E
- Country: India
- State: Kerala
- District: Wayanad

Population (2011)
  - Total: 13,311

Languages
  - Official: Malayalam, English
- Time zone: UTC+5:30 (IST)
- PIN: 670646
- ISO 3166 code: IN-KL
- Vehicle registration: KL-72
- Nearest city: Manathavady

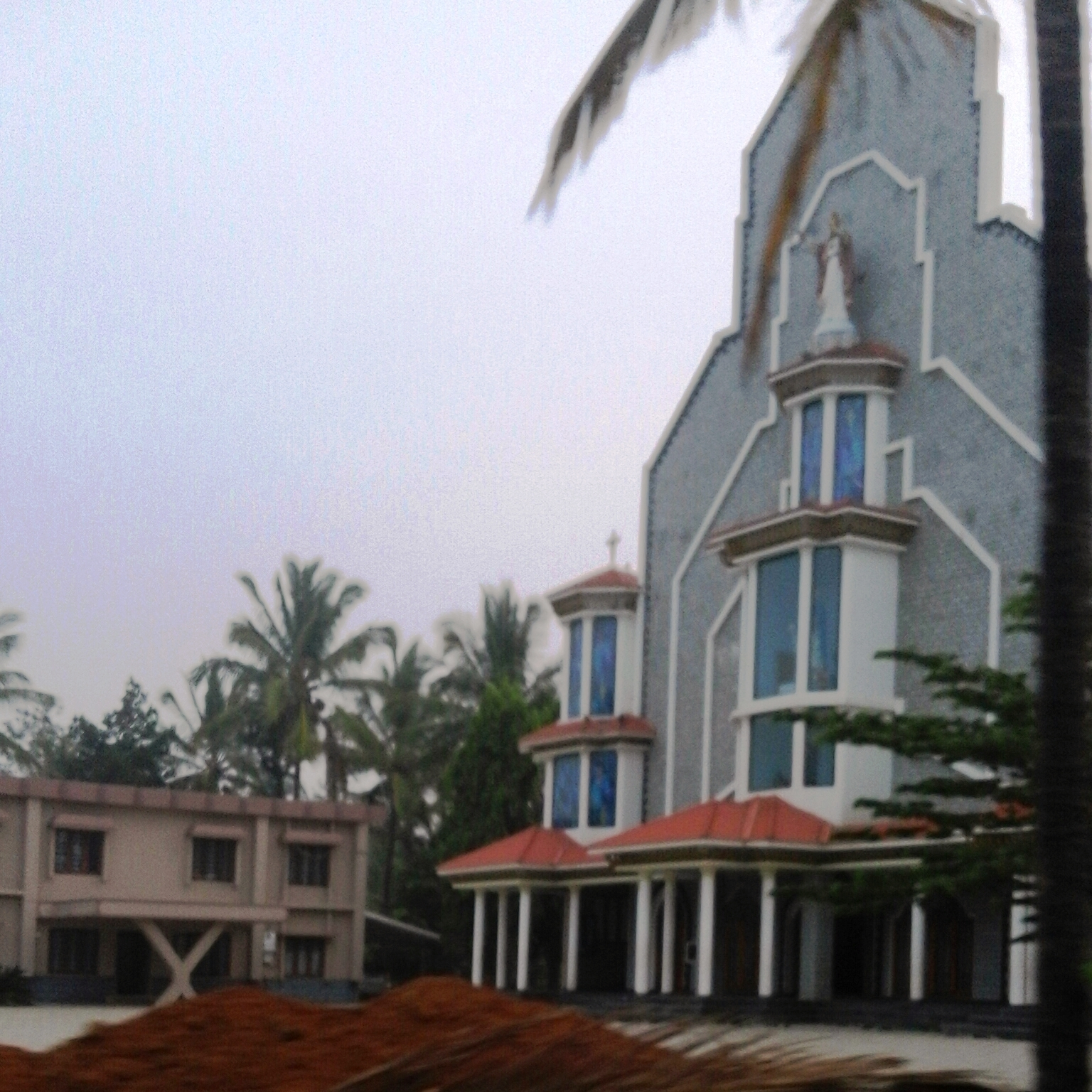
St Catherine 's Syro Malabar Forane Church Payyampally

Payyampally is a town in Wayanad district in the state of Kerala, India.

== Demographics ==
The majority of residents are Syrian Catholics from Pala. As of 2011 India census, Payyampally had a population of 13311 with 6569 males and 6742 females.

== See also ==
- Mananthavady
- Thondernad
- Vellamunda
- Nalloornad
- Thavinjal
- Vimala Nagar
- Anjukunnu
- Panamaram
- Tharuvana
- Kallody
- Oorpally
- Valat
- Thrissilery
