= Valat =

Valat Valad
- village
- Location in Kerala, India Valat (India)
- Coordinates: 11°47′0″N 75°54′0″E
- Country: India
- State: Kerala
- District: Wayanad

Government
  - Type: Panchayati raj (India)
  - Body: Gram panchayat

Population (2011)
  - Total: 10,799

Languages
  - Official: Malayalam, English
- Time zone: UTC+5:30 (IST)
- PIN: 670644
- ISO 3166 code: IN-KL
- Vehicle registration: KL-72

Valat is a village in the Wayanad district of the state of Kerala, India. The village is situated near to Kannur district. There are two Higher Secondary schools in the village and three GV.LP Schools. The majority of its residents work in the agriculture and business industries. Kabini River (one of the rivers in Kerala going towards the East) is a main attraction of this village bringing tourists and visitors from surrounding areas. Valet additionally has a number of resorts and one park known as E3 Theme park.

== Demographics ==
As of the 2011 India census, Valat had a population of 10799 with 5350 males and 5449 females.

== Health and medicine ==
The state government of Kerala has started a center for tribal medicine in this village. The town also has a public health center and a 24-hour private hospital. This village is renowned for its traditional treatments run by the tribal community.

== See also ==
- Mananthavady
- Thondernad
- Vellamunda
- Nalloornad
- Payyampally
- Thavinjal
- Vimalanager
- Anjukunnu
- Panamaram
- Tharuvana
- Kallody
- Oorpally
- Thrissilery
