= Kokkadavil =

Area of India

Kokkadavil is a small area located at Tharuvana in Vellamunda panchayat, Wayanad district, in the state of Kerala, India.

== See also ==
- Tharuvana
- Vellamunda
- Mananthavady
