= Vellamunda Gram Panchayat =

Vellamunda
- Grama Panchayat
- Location in Kerala, India Vellamunda (India)
- Coordinates: 11.7341026°N 75.9376146°E
- Country: India
- State: Kerala
- District: Wayanad
- Established: 1950 (Reorganized in 1961)

Government
  - Type: Grama Panchayat
  - Member of Parliament: Priyanka Gandhi (INC)
  - Member of Legislative Assembly: Usha Vijayan (INC)
  - Panchayat President: Khamar Laila (IUML)
  - Village Officer: Rejimol T.D.

Area
  - Total: 64.54 km^{2} (24.92 sq mi)

Population (2001)
  - Total: 30,498
  - Density: 472.5/km^{2} (1,224/sq mi)

Languages
  - Official: Malayalam
- Time zone: UTC+5:30 (IST)
- PIN: 670731
- Telephone code: 04935
- Vehicle registration: KL 72
- Nearest city: Mananthavady

Vellamunda is a town and Grama Panchayat in Wayanad district, in the Indian state of Kerala. It is located approximately 12 km from Mananthavady and is one of the prominent settlements and administrative centres in North Malabar.

== Etymology ==
=== Vellamunda 10th Mile ===
It is exactly 10 miles away from Mananthavady

=== Vellamunda Pazhanjana ===
Vellamunda Pazhanjana or Pazhanjana means Vellamunda the Old Settlement. Pazhanjana is the Oldest Settlement in Vellamunda.

=== Vellamunda 8/4 ===
Ettenalu means "8/4" in Malayalam (Ettu = 8, Nalu = 4). It got its name because it is exactly 8 miles and 4 furlongs away from the town of Mananthavady.

== History ==
The areas that constitute the present-day Vellamunda were ruled by the Puliya Kingdom before the days of Pazhassi Raja. The Puliyan Nair clan, which inherited control of these areas, were not very popular among the commons. This led to unrests from the Naduvazhis (Lords) of sub-divisions of the place, namely, Mangalassery, Vattathod, Cherukara, Karingari, and Tharuvana, who approached Pazhassi Raja with a request to overthrow the Puliya Clan. Pazhassi duly obliged and defeated them, subsequently adding the area to The Kingdom of Kottayam.

Pazhanjana is the oldest settlement in Vellamunda. It is one of the earliest inhabited areas in the region.

It is believed that Mangalassery Hills served as one of the bases for his guerilla warfare against the British.

In 1950, Chondarnad (Present-day Thondarnad) and Vellamunda villages were merged to form Vellamunda Grama Panchayat, which was reorganized in 1961 by removing Thondarnad and adding Porunnannur.

== Location and Connectivity ==
Vellamunda is located on the Mananthavady-Kuttiyady route, and is well connected to nearby towns by roads. Kozhikode (83 km away) is accessible via the Kuttiyady Churam while the district capital Kalpetta, which is at a distance of approximately 30 km, can be reached via Padinjarathara.

== Tourism ==
Vellamunda Grama Panchayat has several natural and scenic attractions. The major tourist attractions include:

- Pulinjal Mala Waterfalls
- Banasura Hills
- Mangalassery Hill
- Chirapullu Peak
- Narangachal
- Makkiyad Meenmutty

== Demographics ==
Vellamunda, similar to other areas in Wayanad, is a not-so-densely populated village. The salient features from the 2011 India Census data are given below.

Demographics
Sl No.	Specification	Details
1	Population	30498
2	Population (Male)	15410
3	Population (Female)	15088
4	Population Density	473
5	Sex Ratio	979
6	Literacy Rate	81.84
7	Literacy Rate (Male)	89.13
8	Literacy Rate (Female)	74.42

== Administration ==
The Vellamunda grama panchayat is governed as per the Panchayati Raj act and is administrated by the democratically elected Village Head (Panchayat President) and the council of elected Panchayat members. P. K. Ahmed Haji served as the first President after the panchayat was reorganized in 1961. P. Thankamani of the Indian Union Muslim League, whose term started in 2015, is the incumbent Panchayat President. The details of the council of members are as follows.

Election Details (2025)
Ward No.	Ward Name	Member	Political Party	Reservation
1	Kandathuvayal	Sumesh P M	IUML	ST
2	Vellamunda 10th Mile	Abdul Salam P K	IUML	General
3	Pazhanjana	Leela Ganeshan	IUML	ST Woman
4	Pulinjal	Athikka Bai M	IUML	Woman
5	Vellamunda 8/4	Ramla Muhammed	IUML	Woman
6	Kattayad	Khamar Laila	IUML	President
7	Kokkadavu	Abdullah Kaniyankandi	CPI(M)	General
8	Pariyaramukku	Sumayya	IUML	General
9	Tharuvana	Mammootty Madani	IUML	General
10	Peechamcode	Ezhuthan Mammotty	IUML	General
11	Karingari	Unnachi Moidu	CPIM	General
12	Kappumkunnu	Bibina Babu	CPI(M)	General Woman
13	Kellur	Shameer Thuruthiyil	IUML	General
14	Kommayad	Blessy Thomas	CPI(M)	Woman
15	Paliyana	Rakesh	CPI(M)	General
16	Mazhuvannur	Nasar Saavan	IUML	General
17	Pulikkadu	Soudha Koduvery	IUML	Woman
18	Cherukara	Bushara Kombi	IUML	Woman
19	Ozhukkanmmoola	Lathika	INC	Woman
20	Maniyil	Geetha	IUML	ST Women
21	Mothakkara	Shimna	CPI(M)	Woman
22	Varambetta	Sudhakaran K C	INC	ST
23	Narokkadavu	Suresh	CPIM	General
24	Mangalasserymala	Shyji Shibu	Independent	General

== See also ==
- Mananthavady
- Thondernad
- Nalloornad
- Payyampally
- Thavinjal
- Vimalanager
- Anjukunnu
- Panamaram
- Tharuvana
- Kallody
- Oorpally
- Valat
- Thrissilery
