= Karat Shiva Temple =

- Karat Shiva Temple, Porunnanore, Wayanad, Kerala

Religion
- Affiliation: Hinduism
- District: Wayanad
- Deity: Shiva
- Festival: Maha Shivaratri

Location
- Location: Porunnanore
- State: Kerala
- Country: India
- Interactive map of Karat Shiva Temple
- Coordinates: 11.744129°N 76.011576°E

Architecture
- Type: Architecture of Kerala

Specifications
- Temple: One
- Elevation: 802.63 m (2,633 ft)

Karat Temple is a Hindu temple dedicated to god Shiva, located in the town of Kommayad near to Mananthavady, Kerala, India which is one of the oldest temples in Wayanad district which is formed approximately one thousand years ago. The temple was destroyed by Tipu Sultan in 18th century. This was rebuilt by the effort led by Krishnan Nambeesan and public of all religions. Here the shivapooja is done every first day of Malayalam month and the prathishta dina festival is celebrated on May 10, 11 every year.
