= Mazhuvannur Maha Siva Kshethram =

Mazhuvannur Maha Siva Temple
- Mazhuvannur Maha Siva Temple

- Mazhuvannur Maha Siva Temple

Religion
- Affiliation: Hinduism
- District: Wayanad
- Deity: Shiva
- Festival: Maha Shivaratri

Location
- Location: Porunnanore
- State: Kerala
- Country: India
- Coordinates: 11.731295°N 75.987685°E

Architecture
- Type: Architecture of Kerala

Specifications
- Temple: One
- Elevation: 802.29 m (2,632 ft)

Mazhuvannur Maha Siva Kshethram is a Hindu temple at Tharuvana in Wayanad district of the Indian state of Kerala. The presiding deity is Shiva.

== Gallery ==
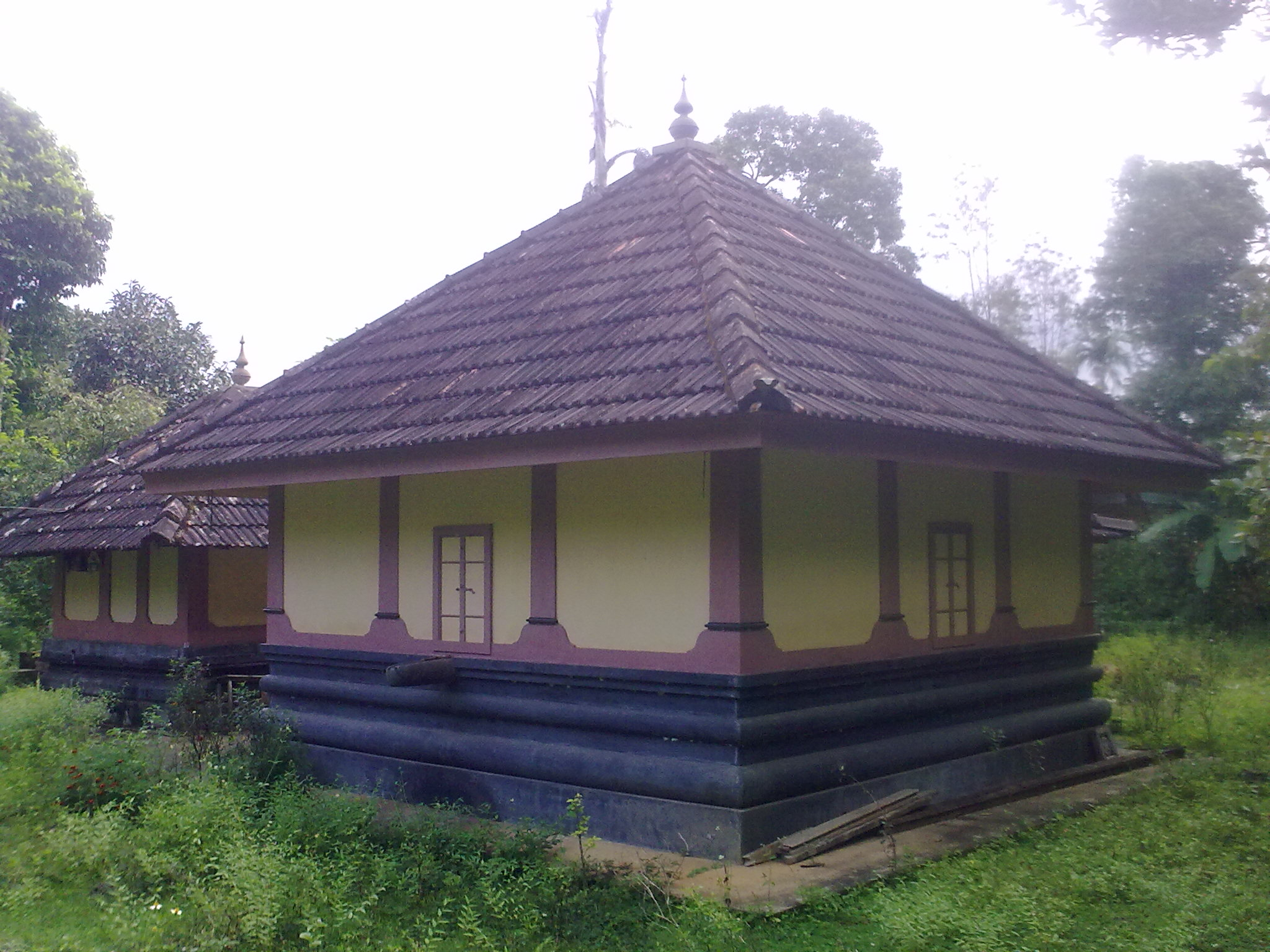
Mazhuvannur Temple

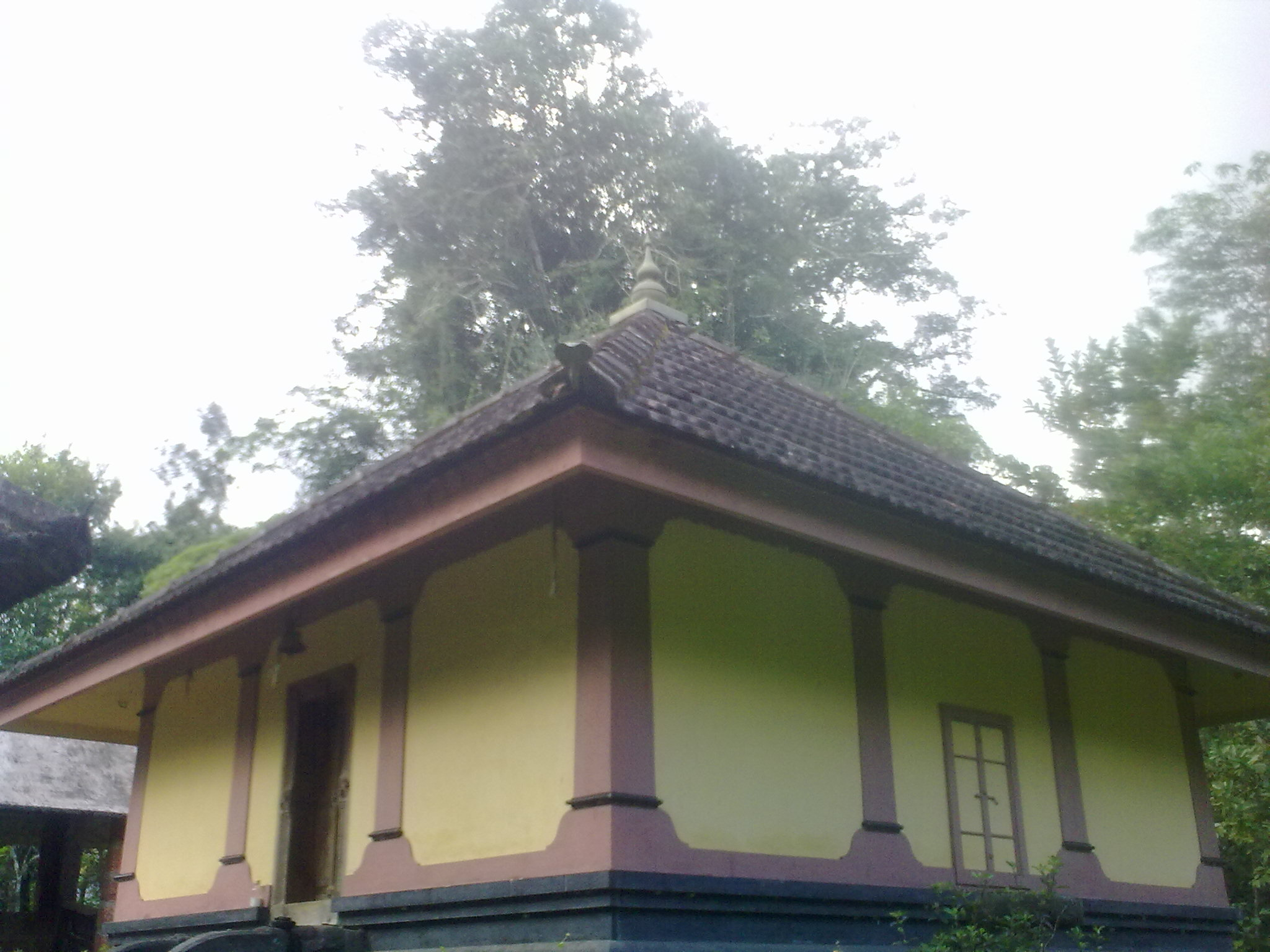
Side view of the temple

== See also ==
- Temples of Kerala
- Wayanad
- Mananthavady
