= Banasura Hills =

One of the tallest mountains in Western Ghats, Kerala

Banasura Hill ബാണാസുര മല
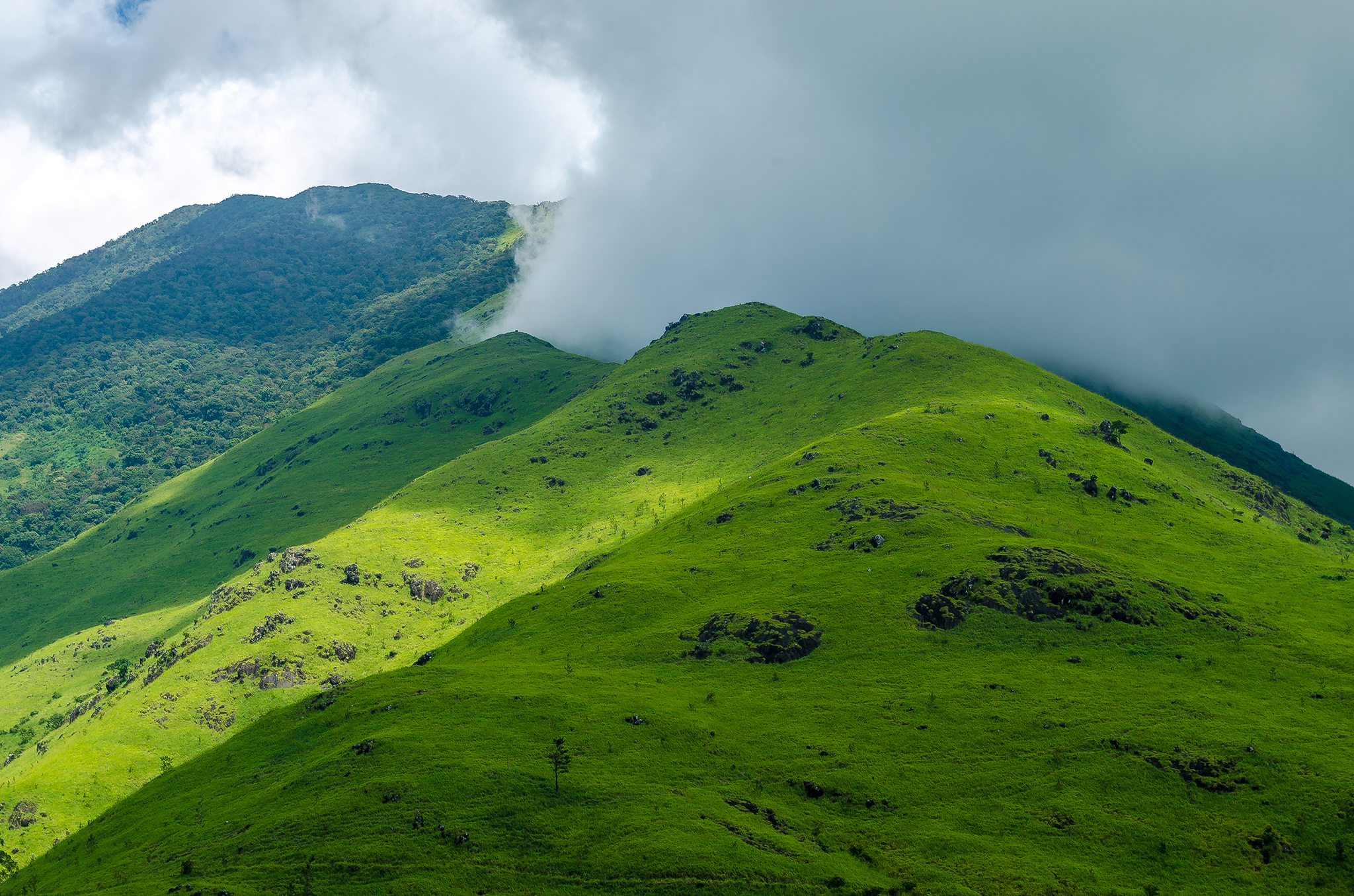

Highest point
- Elevation: 2,073 m (6,801 ft)
- Prominence: 1,306 m (4,285 ft)
- Listing: Ribu
- Coordinates: 11°41′39″N 75°54′29″E

Geography
- Location within Kerala
- Location: Border of Vellamunda and Padinjarathara, Wayanad district and Vadakara Taluk, Kozhikode district, Kerala, India
- Parent range: Western Ghats

Climbing
- Easiest route: Hike

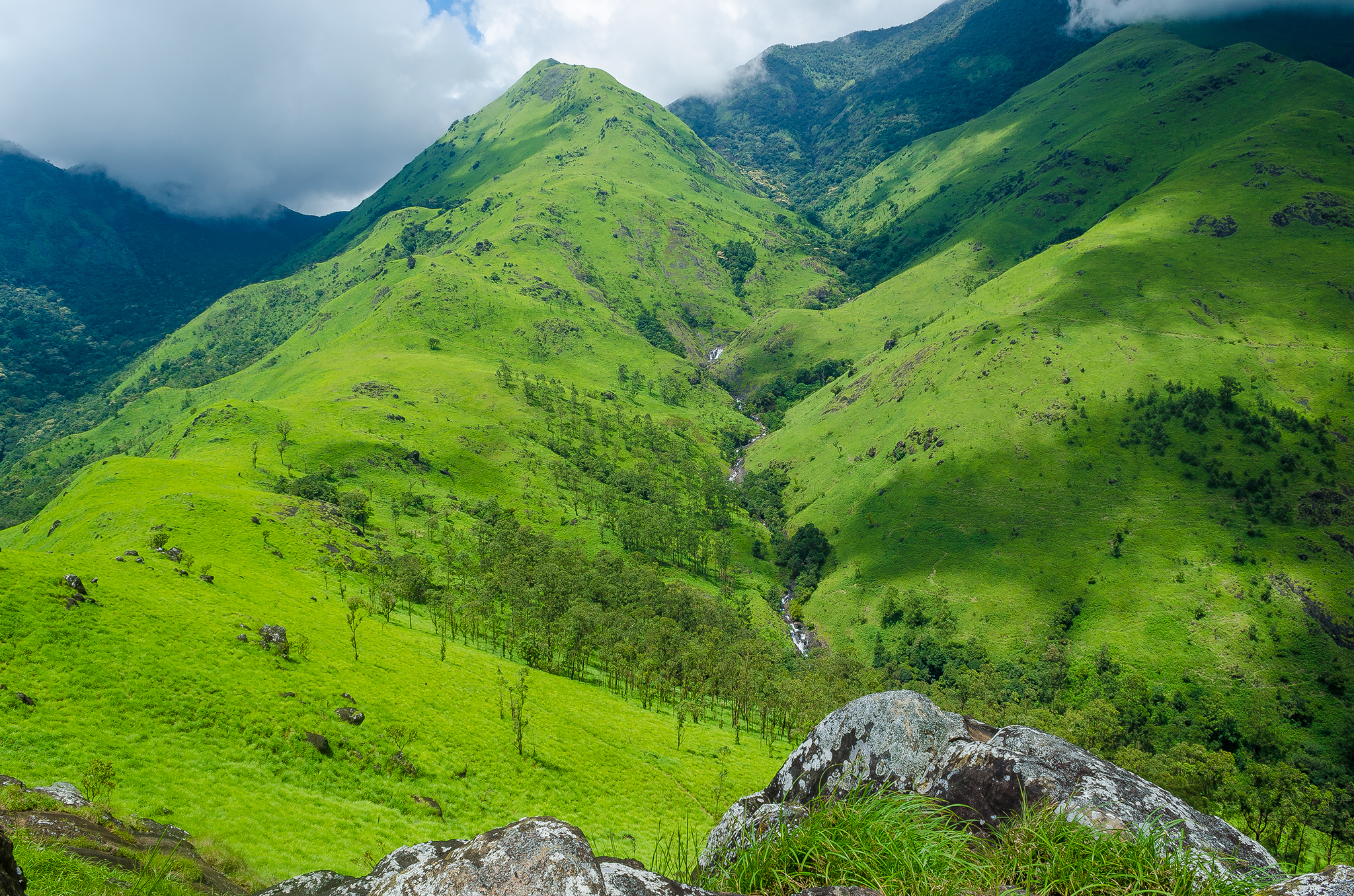
A view of Banasura hill

Banasura Hills is situated in Vellamunda and it is one of the tallest mountains in the Western Ghats of the Wayanad district, Kerala, India. The hill is named after Banasura, a mythical character of Indian legends. It is one of the highest peaks exceeding 2,000m between Nilgiris and Himalayas after Chembra Peak.

== Geography ==
Banasura Hill has an altitude of 2,073 metres (6,801 ft) and is a part of the Western Ghats. It is the northernmost peak higher than 2,000 metres (6,562 ft) south of the Gangetic plains in India. It lies off the state highway from Kuttiady to Mananthavady. Mananthavady which lies 25 km away is the closest town and the closest state transport depot. The closest National Highway is NH 766 that passes through Kalpetta which is about 37 km away.

== Trekking routes and visitor information ==
Along the way there is a thunderous waterfall that locals call "Meenmutty". Trekking pass should be collected from Meenmutty falls ticket counter itself. Ticket counter will close at 11 AM. Only limited tickets are issued per day. It is a good three-hour climb to the top of the hill. The view from there is spectacular. At the foot of the hill is the Banasura Sagar Dam, the largest earth dam in India. The dam is another point from where one can start the trek up Banasura Hill.

== Flora and fauna ==
The narrow trail that leads up to the top of the hill winds through thick tropical vegetation. The flora includes some rare medicinal plants. The fauna found en route consist of monkeys, wild boars, deer and wild elephants.

== Tribes and local history ==
There are four tribal settlements at the foot of the Banasura Hill belonging largely to the Kurichiya tribe. The Kurichiyas have a martial tradition, and are experts with the bow and arrow. When Kerala Varma Pazhassi Raja revolted against the British for imposing exorbitant tax on agricultural products, and fled to the forests of Wayanad to fight a long-drawn guerilla war against them, it was to these Kurichiya tribesmen that the Pazhassi Raja turned for support. The Pazhassi Raja used their knowledge of the topography of the area to inflict defeats on the British forces. The rugged and thickly forested terrain around Banasura Hill with numerous caves, streams and watercourses formed an ideal hiding place for the Pazhassi Raja. In modern days, the higher elevations are inhabited by descendants of the Pazhassi Raja who have set up an intricate system of Ziplines and swinging ropes to traverse the network of tree houses they've constructed.

== See also ==
- Banasura Sagar Dam
- Kurichiya tribe
- Pazhassi Raja
- Thariyode
- Thariode
