= Hill Brahmin =

Hill Brahmin may refer to:

- Bahun, Khas Brahmins of Nepal sometimes called Hill Brahmin to distinguish them from Brahmins of the Terai
- Kurichiya, a tribe in Kerala sometimes called Malai Brahmins or Hill Brahmins
