= Karingari =

Village in Kerala, India

Coordinates: 11°44′N 75°59′E

Karingari is a village near Tharuvana in Vellamunda panchayath, Mananthavady area, Wayanad, Kerala, India.

== Important landmarks ==
- Government Upper Primary School Karingari (G.U.P.S. Karingari) is a nine decade old public school in this village.
- Sree Mankandayalam devoted to Lord Ayappan on Parithiyatukunnel is the spiritual center historically open to everyone irrespective of caste, religion and creed.
- The other govt institution in this village is a veterinary clinic.
- Mechilaat Sreekrishna temple is situated near the Karingari- Nadakkal Road which is a connection road to the Tharuvana-Kommayad road. This Sreekrishna temple runs under Thirunelli devoswam. This temple has Poojaas every day at morning (7.30am.9.00am), evening (6.30pm-8.00pm).

== Transportation ==
Karingari can be accessed from Mananthavady or Kalpetta. The Periya ghat road connects Mananthavady to Kannur and Thalassery. The Thamarassery mountain road connects Calicut with Kalpetta. The Kuttiady mountain road connects Vatakara with Kalpetta and Mananthavady. The Palchuram mountain road connects Kannur and Iritty with Mananthavady. The road from Nilambur to Ooty is also connected to Wayanad through the village of Meppadi.

The nearest railway station is at Mysore and the nearest airports are Kozhikode International Airport-120 km, Bengaluru International Airport-290 km, and Kannur International Airport, 58 km.
