= Malayampadi =

- Village
- Location in Kannur, Kerala, India Malayampadi (India)
- Coordinates: 11.872928°N 75.7967371°E
- Country: India
- State: Kerala
- District: Kannur

Area
  - Total: 2.84 km^{2} (1.10 sq mi)
- Elevation: 397 m (1,302 ft)

Languages
  - Official: Malayalam
- Time zone: UTC+5:30 (IST)
- PIN: 670674
- Telephone code: 0490
- ISO 3166 code: IN-KL
- Vehicle registration: KL 78 (Irrity), KL 13 (Kannur) and KL 58 (Thalassery)
- Lok Sabha constituency Kannur: Assembly constituency Peravoor
- Climate: Pleasant (Köppen)

Malayampadi is a small village in Kannur District of Kerala, India. The village is located on the slope of the Western Ghats 1302 feet above sea level. The name Malayampadi originated from Malonpadi, malon the tribal god of kurichya and padi means step, literally the temple of malon.

== History ==
Malayampadi and nearby areas became a part of the Pazhassi dynasty when they achieved wayanad by defeating vedakarasan of thiruneelli fort. These areas were the natural habitat of tribals called Kurichya. There were only Kurichyas settled in these areas until people from other parts of Malabar and Kerala migrated to this area and establish their settlements. In the early 1930s, there were migrations to the village called Kolakkad which is near Malayampadi. Wild animals and malaria become the biggest hurdles on their way to establish settlements in these areas. In the 1960s, people settled in Kolakkad and Thondiyil came to Malayampadi for timber for making wooden furniture. It was well known for timbers like teak and rosewood. They made small roads to transport timber. People started settling and started cropping tapioca and plantain in large areas; it was very hard to protect their yields from wild animals like boar and elephants, so they started cultivating lemongrass to distill its aromatic scent. It was the daily livelihood of the people for a long time. And slowly it became a land which yields spices, cashew nut and coconut. Later people of this village constructed small chapels, one at malayampadi dedicated to Fatima matha and the second at Rajamudi dedicated to infant Jesus.

== Transportation ==
The national highway passes through Kannur town. Mangalore and Mumbai can be accessed on the northern side and Cochin and Thiruvananthapuram can be accessed on the southern side. The road to the east of Iritty connects to Mysore and Bangalore. The nearest railway station is Kannur on Mangalore-Palakkad line. There are airports at KannurMangalore and Calicut.
