= Chembra Peak =

Mountain in Kerala, India

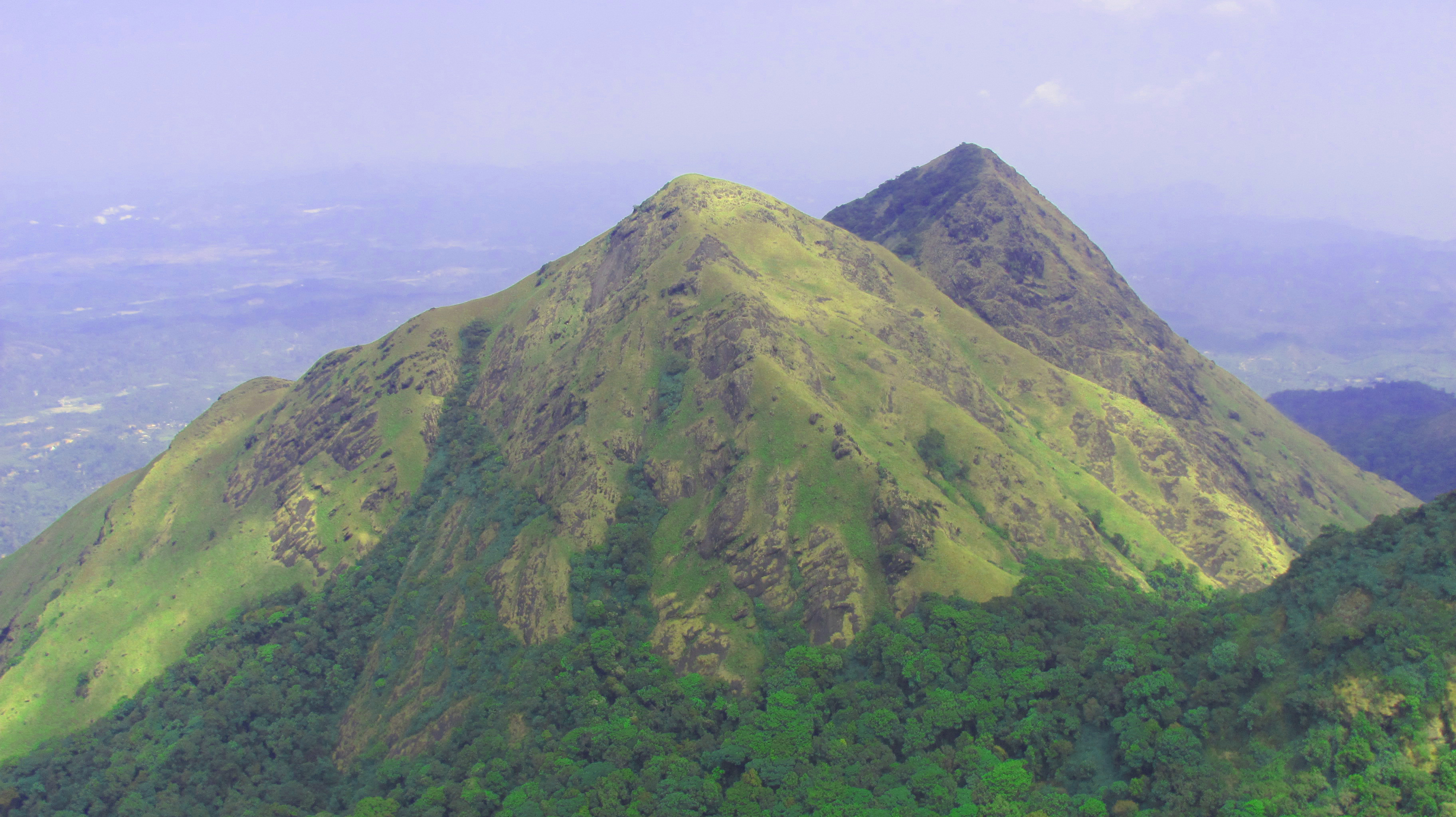
- View of Chembra Peak

Highest point
- Elevation: 2,100 m (6,890 ft)
- Coordinates: 11°30′44″N 76°05′22″E

Naming
- Native name: ചെമ്പ്ര കൊടുമുടി (Malayalam)

Geography
- Location within Kerala
- Location: Vythiri Taluk Wayanad District, Kerala, India
- Parent range: Western Ghats

Climbing
- Easiest route: Hike

Chembra Peak (Chembra Mala) is a mountain in the state of Kerala, India, with an elevation of 2,100 m (6,890 ft) above sea level. The highest peak in the Wayanad hills and one of the highest peaks in the Western Ghats, adjoining the Nilgiri Hills and Vellarimala, it is located in the Wayanad district and Malappuram district in Kerala, near Kalpetta town and Nilambur taluk.

Visits to the peak are organized by the Chempra Peak VSS under the control of the South Wayanad Forest Development Agency; guides are provided for trekking. Chembra Peak is accessible by foot from Meppadi. The District Tourism Promotion Council provides guides and trekking equipment to tourists for fees. Banasura Sagar Dam and Banasura Hills are also nearby.

== Gallery ==
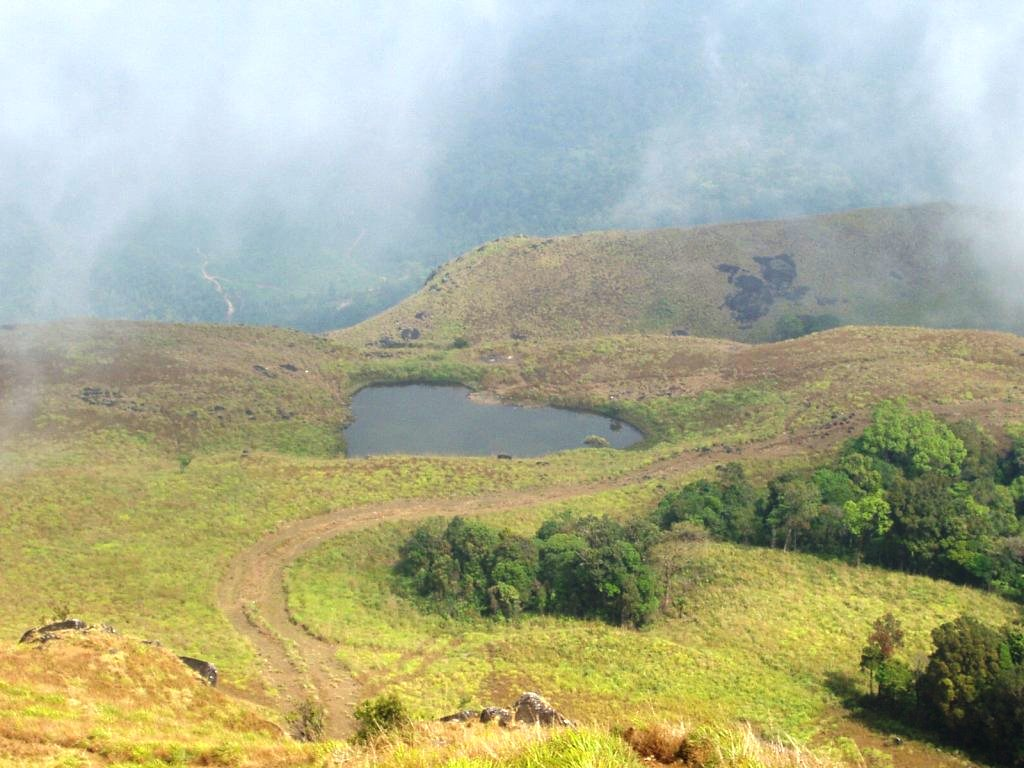
Lake en route to the top of Chembra Peak

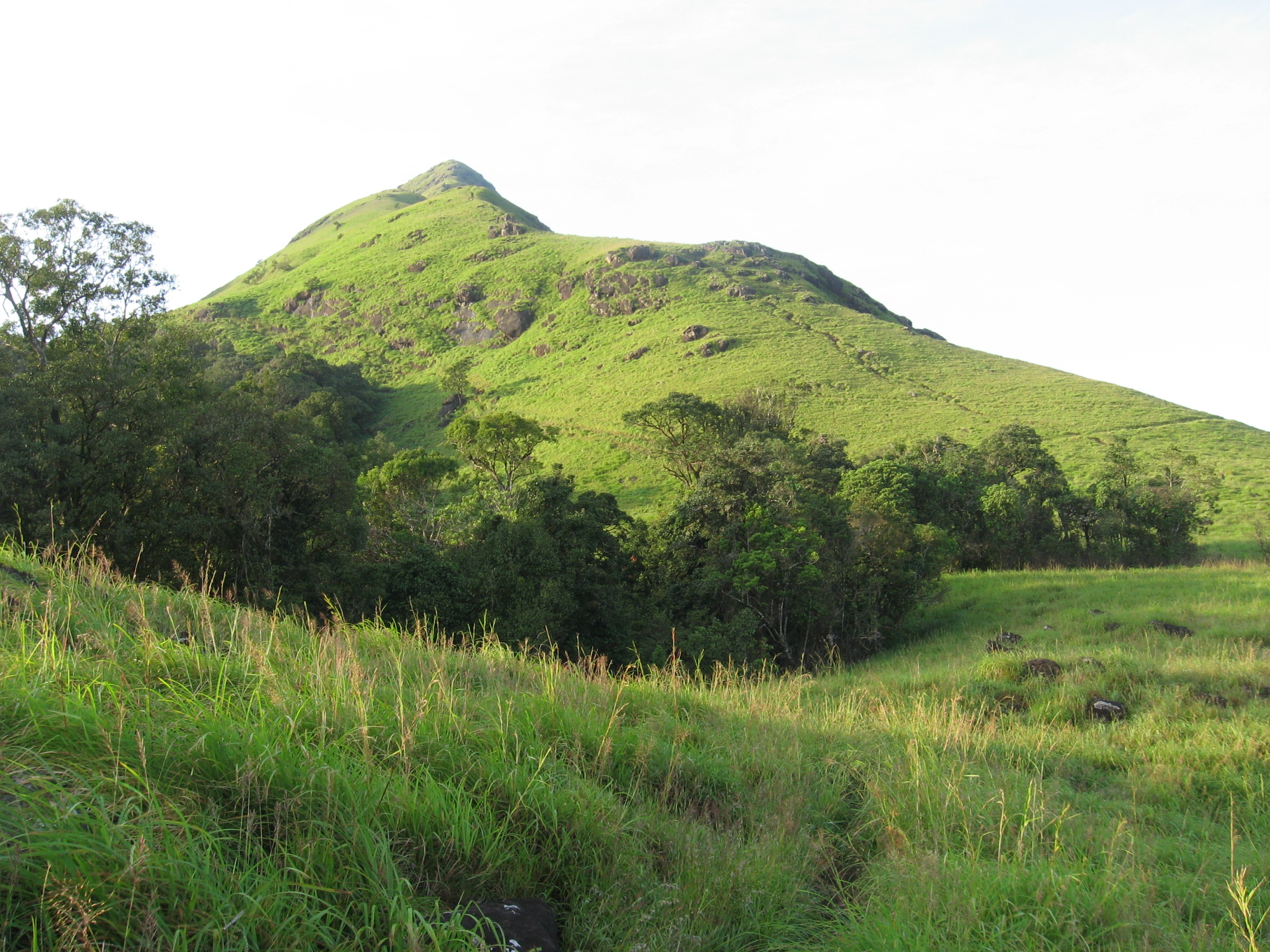
Top view

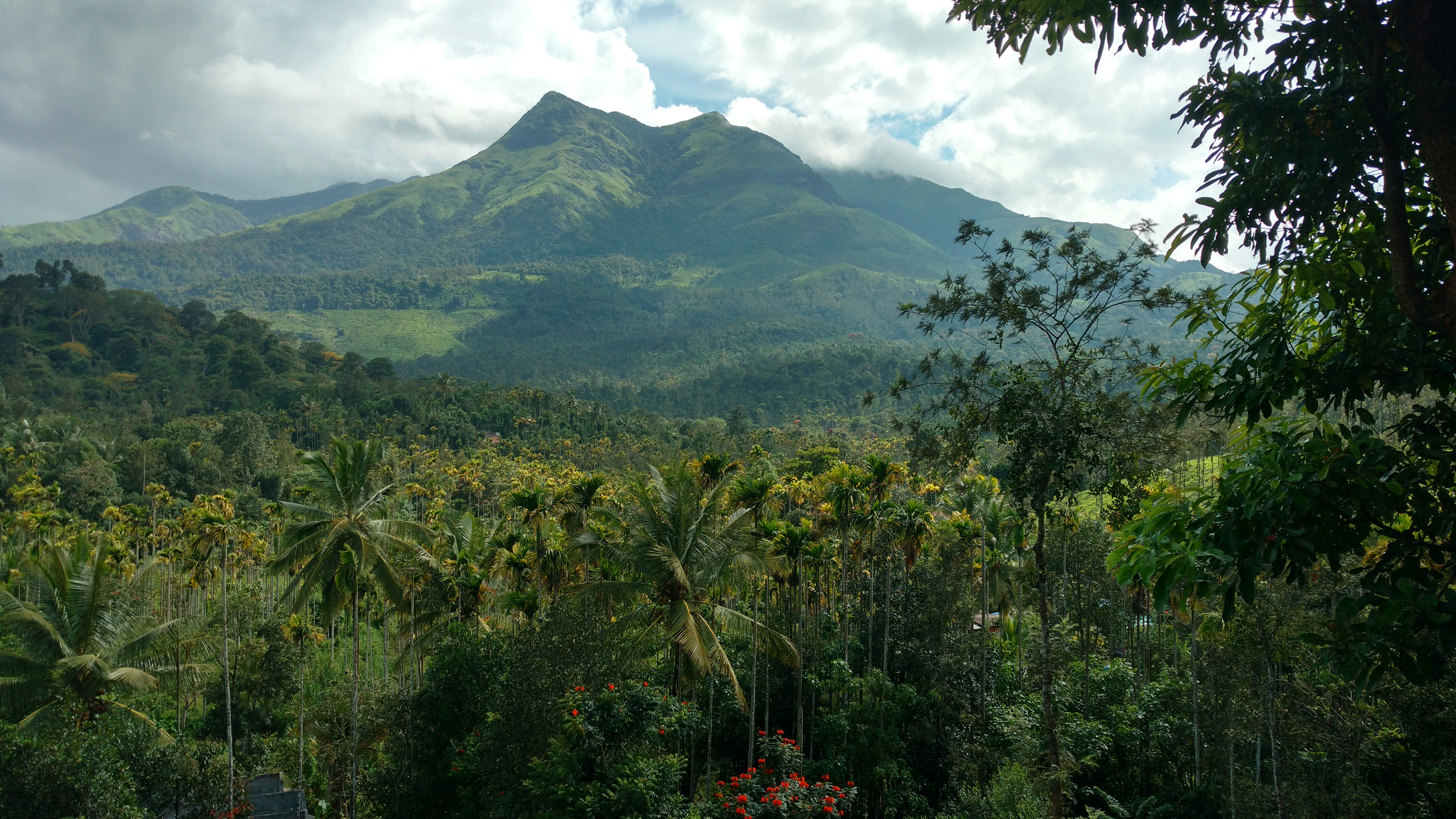
View From Meppadi

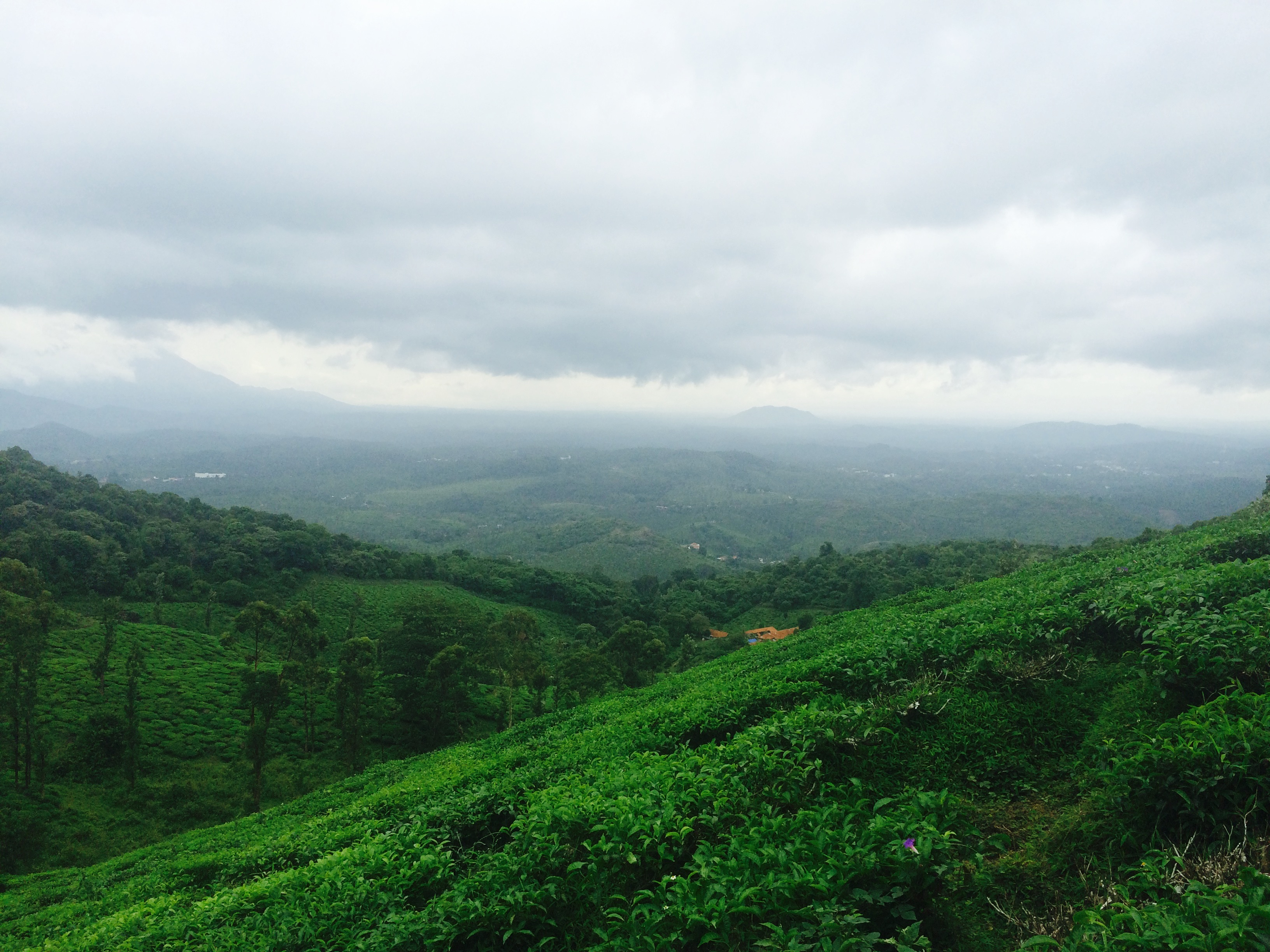
Tea plantations, Chembra peak, Western Ghats

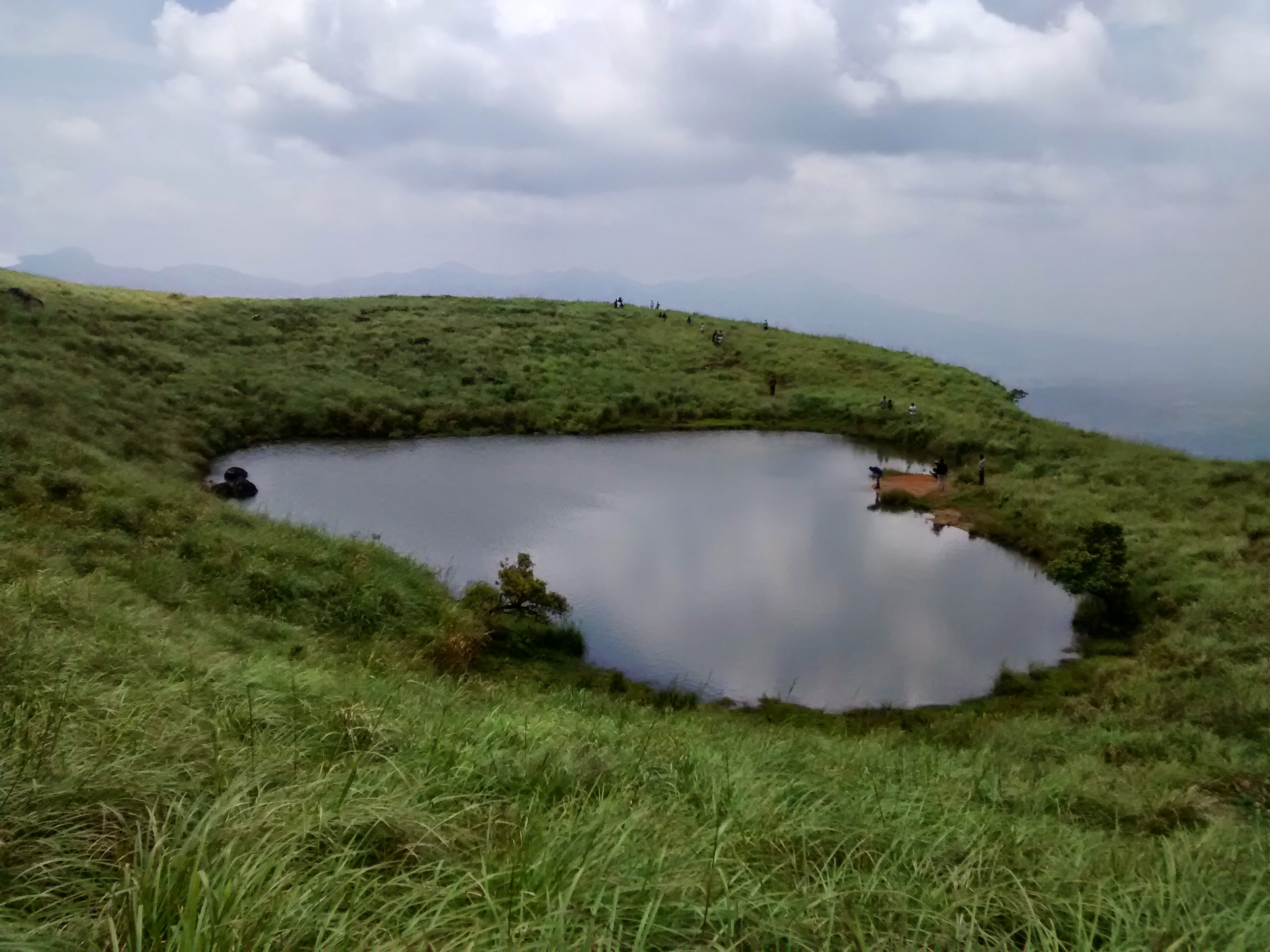
Heart shaped lake

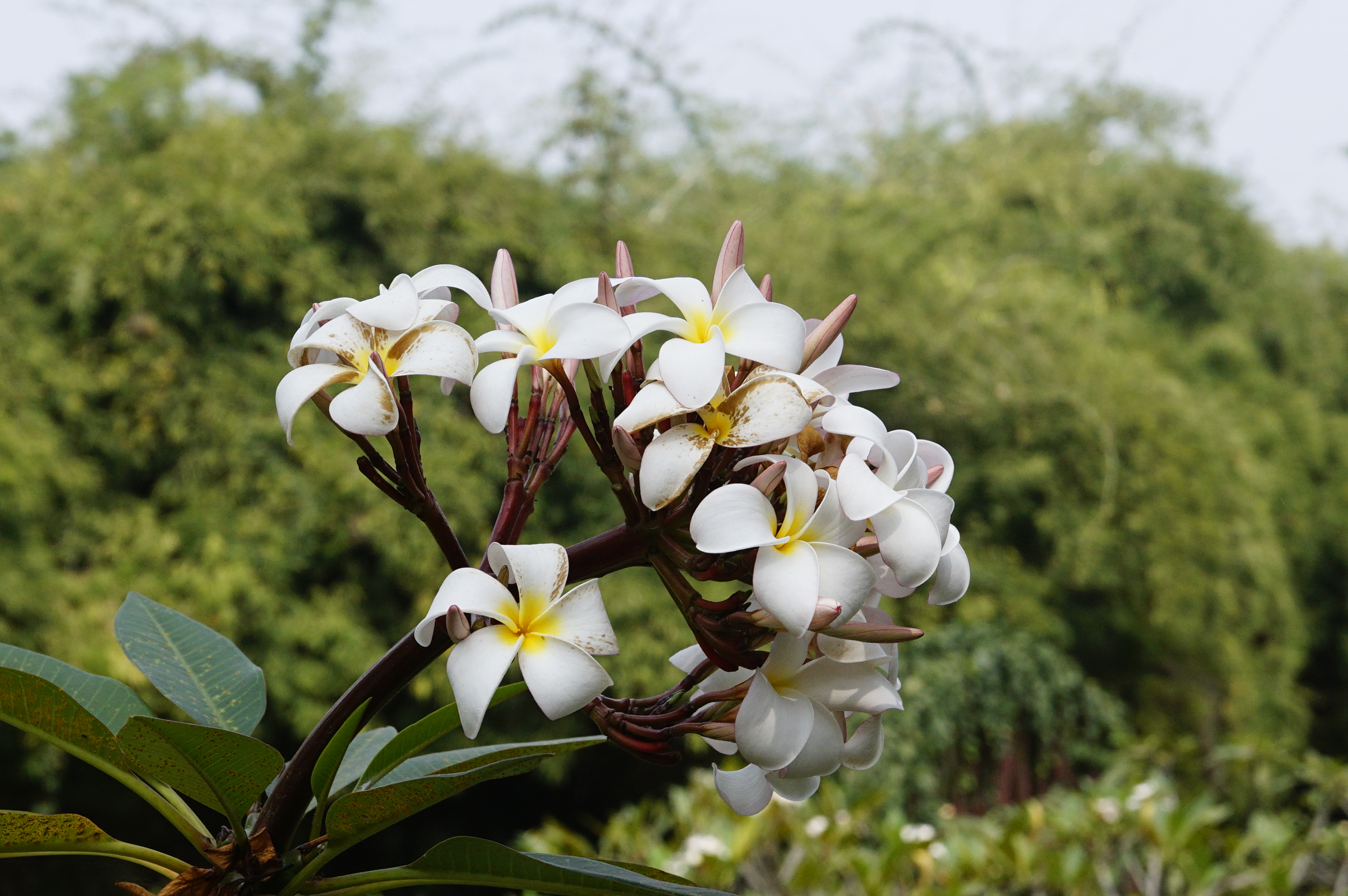
Plumeria rubra

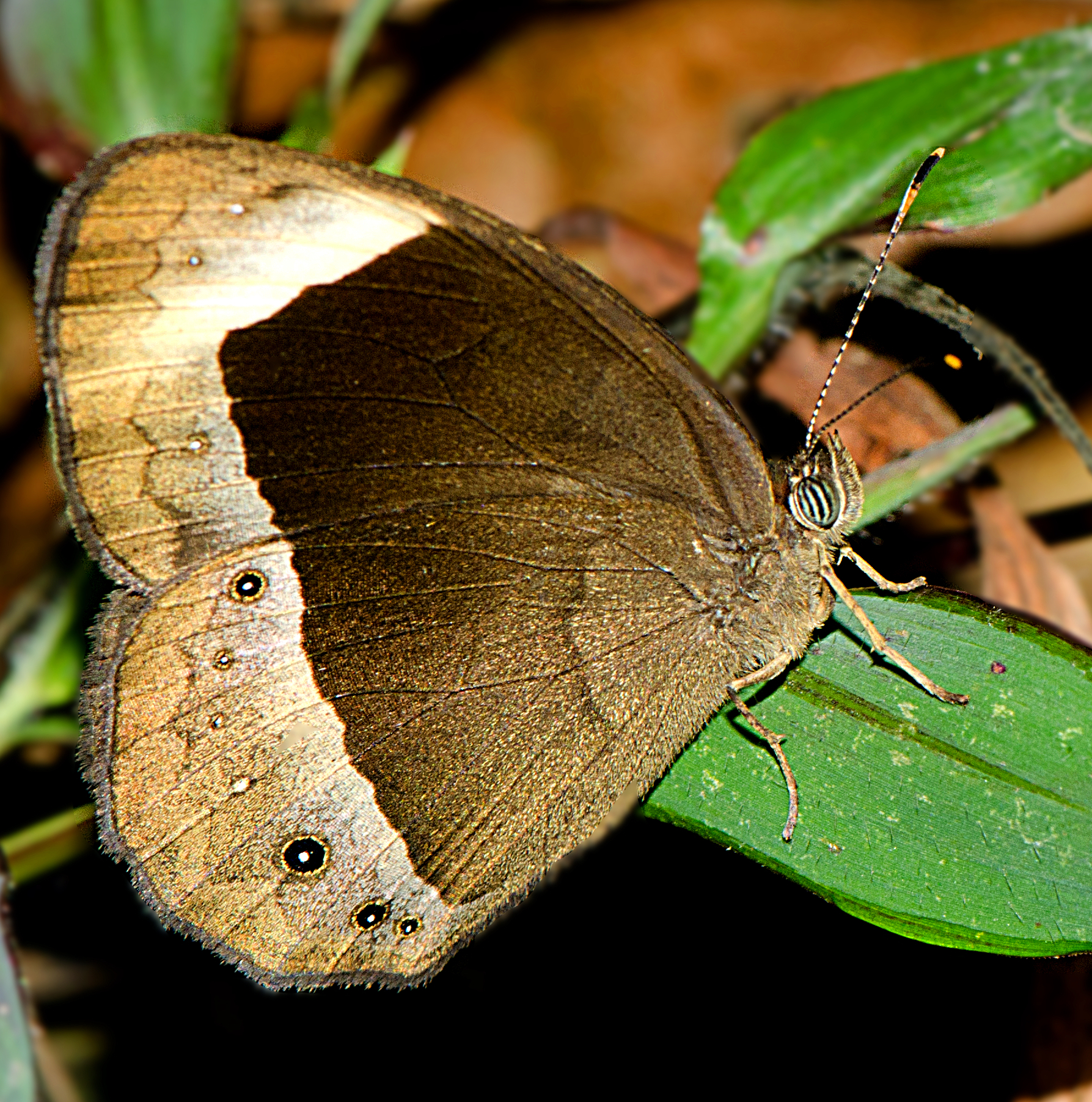
White-bar bushbrown (Mycalesis anaxias)
