= Thrissilery Shiva Temple =

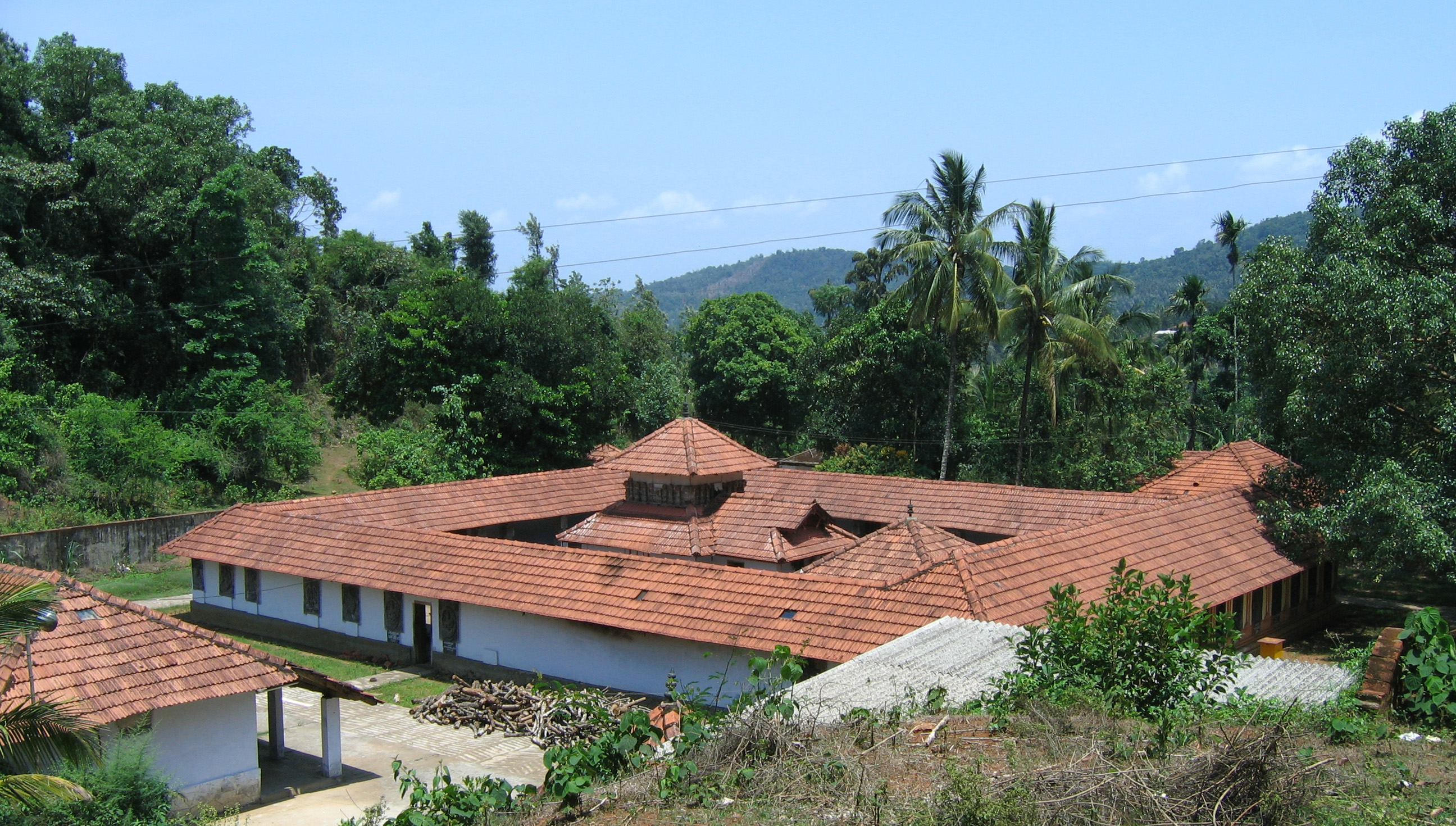
- Thrissilery Shiva Temple, Wayanad

- Thrissilery Shiva Temple, Wayanad, Kerala

Religion
- Affiliation: Hinduism
- District: Wayanad
- Deity: Shiva
- Festivals: Maha Shivaratri, 'Puthari' and an annual festival

Location
- Location: Thrissilery, Wayanad
- State: Kerala
- Country: India
- Interactive map of Thrissilery Shiva Temple
- Coordinates: 11.8515°N 76.0166°E

Architecture
- Type: Architecture of Kerala

Specifications
- Temple: One
- Elevation: 845.33 m (2,773 ft)

Thrissilery Shiva Temple is a Shiva temple situated at Thrissilery neighbourhood in Wayanad, Kerala, India. This ancient temple is dedicated to Shiva. This temple is a popular pilgrim centre in Wayanad.

This temple is believed to have been built about 1000 years ago by Chera kings.

== Location ==
This temple is located, with the coordinates of (11.8515°N 76.0166°E) at about 19 km from Thirunelly.

Thrissilery Shiva Temple (Kerala)

== Details ==
It is believed that the performance of ancestral rites at Thirunelly Vishnu Temple remain incomplete unless followed by visiting this temple.

== Sub deities ==
Parvati, Ganesha, Balakrishnan and Dharma Sastha are the other deities in this temple. There is a separate shrine viz., Jal Durga shrine which was consecrated by Parashurama.

== Festivals ==
In the Malayalam month of Meenam, an annual festival is celebrated and in the month of Thulam, a festival viz., 'Puthari' is celebrated in this temple.
