= Porunnanore =

- village
- Country: India
- State: Kerala
- District: Wayanad

Population (2011)
  - Total: 22,137

Languages
  - Official: Malayalam, English
- Time zone: UTC+5:30 (IST)
- PIN: 6XXXXX
- ISO 3166 code: IN-KL
- Vehicle registration: KL-72

Porunnanore is a village near Tharuvana, Vellamunda in Wayanad district in the state of Kerala, India.

== Demographics ==
As of 2011 India census, Porunnanore had a population of 22137 with 10909 males and 11228 females.

== Transportation ==
Porunnanore village can be accessed from Mananthavady or Kalpetta. The Periya ghat road connects Mananthavady to Kannur and Thalassery. The Thamarassery mountain road connects Calicut with Kalpetta. The Kuttiady mountain road connects Vatakara with Kalpetta and Mananthavady. The Palchuram mountain road connects Kannur and Iritty with Mananthavady. The road from Nilambur to Ooty is also connected to Wayanad through the village of Meppadi.

The nearest railway station is at Mysore and the nearest airports are Kozhikode International Airport-120 km, Bengaluru International Airport-290 km, and Kannur International Airport, 58 km.
