= Kommayad =

Village in Kerala, India

Kommayad is a small village which is situated 10 kilometres (6.2 mi) from Mananthavady, 26 kilometres (16 mi) from Kalpetta. Karat Shiva Temple is one of the oldest temple situated in the village.

== Transportation ==
Kommayad can be accessed from Mananthavady or Kalpetta. The Periya ghat road connects Mananthavady to Kannur and Thalassery. The Thamarassery mountain road connects Calicut with Kalpetta. The Kuttiady mountain road connects Vatakara with Kalpetta and Mananthavady. The Palchuram mountain road connects Kannur and Iritty with Mananthavady. The road from Nilambur to Ooty is also connected to Wayanad through the village of Meppadi.

The nearest railway station is at Mysore and the nearest airports are Kozhikode International Airport-120 km, Bengaluru International Airport-290 km, and Kannur International Airport, 75 km.

== Education ==
Established in 1950, St. Sebastian's UPS, Kommayad is a government aided upper primary school in Kommayad.

== Places of worship ==
Kommayad St. Sebastian's Church is a Catholic church located in Kommayad.
