= Vimala Nagar, Wayanad =

Vimala Nagar Thavinja or Thavinhal
- village
- Location in Kerala, India Vimala Nagar (India)
- Coordinates: 11°48′40″N 75°57′50″E
- Country: India
- State: Kerala
- District: Wayanad

Languages
  - Official: Malayalam, English
- Time zone: UTC+5:30 (IST)
- PIN: 670645
- Telephone code: 04935-
- Vehicle registration: KL-12
- Nearest city: Mananthavady
- Lok Sabha constituency: Kannur
- Climate: Summer-maximum 35 winter minimum-15 (Köppen)

Vimala Nagar or Vimalanagar is a small village in the grama panchayat of Thavinjal, in Mananthavady taluk, Wayanad district, Kerala, India.

== Etymology ==
Vimalanagar is a new name given to the old Thavinhal.

== Geography ==
The village is surrounded by hilly terrain with rivers valleys and paddy fields.

== Demographics ==
It is mainly a rural area inhabited by ethnic groups including the Paniyas and Kurumas. There are age old Kurichya families here as well. Local Hindus and Christians are the descendants of early migrants from former Travancore and Malabar.

== Economy ==
95% of the population work in agriculture. The main agricultural crops in this area include black pepper, coffee, tea, areca nut palms, banana.

== Amenities ==
- Schools: St. Thomas UP School, Sarvodayam UP School (Poroor), Fr.G.K.M. High School (Kaniyaram)
- Temples: Aduvat Mahavishnu Temple, Ambalakkolly Muthirery Siva Temple, Muthirery
- Churches: St. Mary's Church, Little Flower Church, Muthirery
