= Thalappuzha, Wayanad =

Thalappuzha Thavinhal
- village
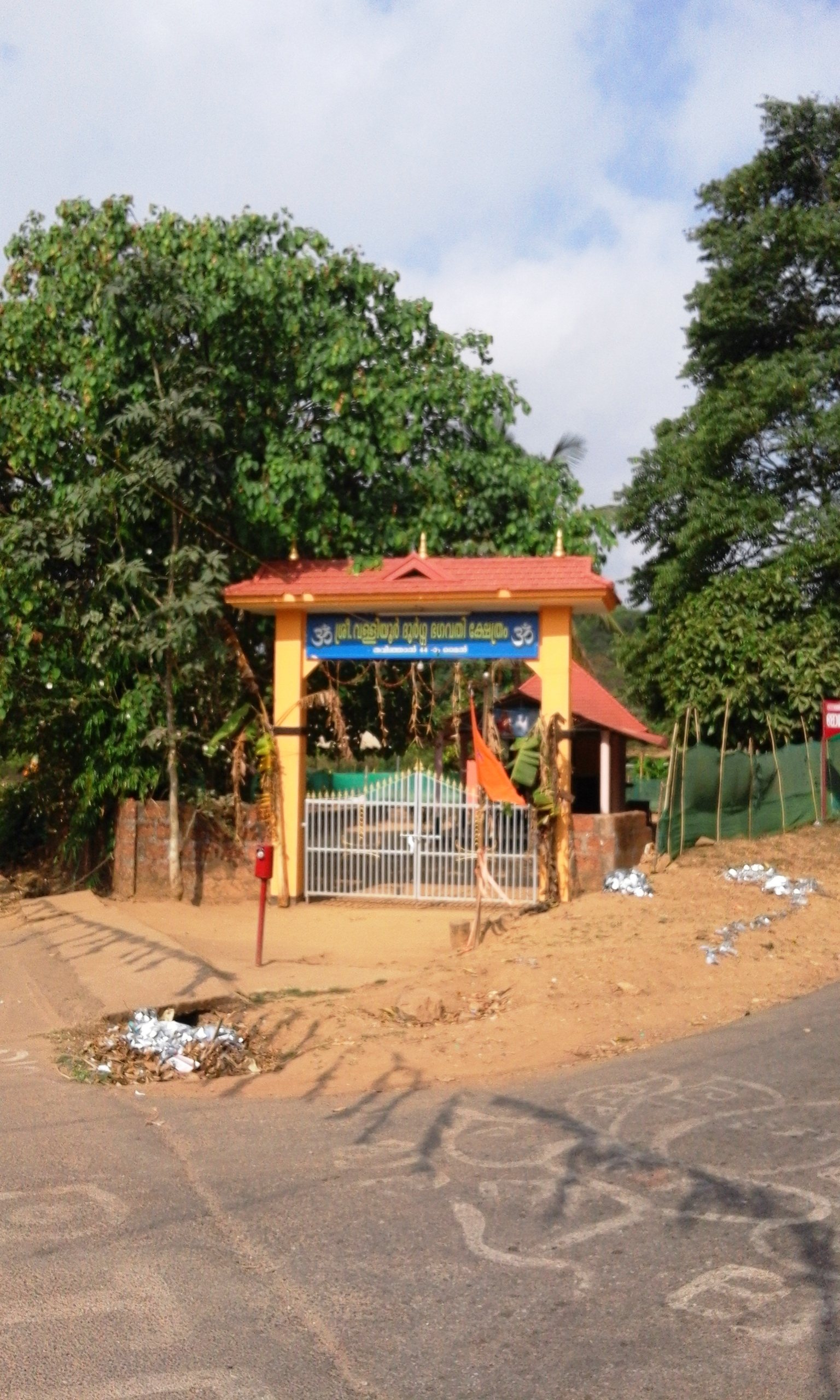
- Durga Bhaghavath temple
- Interactive map of Thalappuzha
- Coordinates: 11°48′40″N 75°57′55″E
- Country: India
- State: Kerala
- District: Wayanad

Population (2011)
  - Total: 17,840

Languages
  - Official: Malayalam, English
- Time zone: UTC+5:30 (IST)
- PIN: 670644
- ISO 3166 code: IN-KL
- Vehicle registration: KL-72

Thalappuzha, Thavinhal or Thavinjal is a village in Wayanad district in the state of Kerala, India. It is formally known as Aranguthum Chall, meaning the place for cultural programs.

== Demographics ==
As of 2011 India census, Thavinhal had a population of 17,840, with 8,761 males and 9,079 females.

== Transportation ==
Thalappuzha village can be accessed from Mananthavady or Kalpetta. The Periya ghat road connects Mananthavady to Kannur and Thalassery. The Thamarassery mountain road connects Calicut with Kalpetta. The Kuttiady mountain road connects Vatakara with Kalpetta and Mananthavady. The Palchuram mountain road connects Kannur and Iritty with Mananthavady. The road from Nilambur to Ooty is also connected to Wayanad through the village of Meppadi.

The nearest railway station is at Mysore and the nearest airports are Kannur International Airport- 58 km, Kozhikode International Airport-120 km and Bengaluru International Airport-290 km, and . Agriculture is the mainstay of the economy. Coffee, black pepper and vanilla are the main cash crops.

== Gallery ==
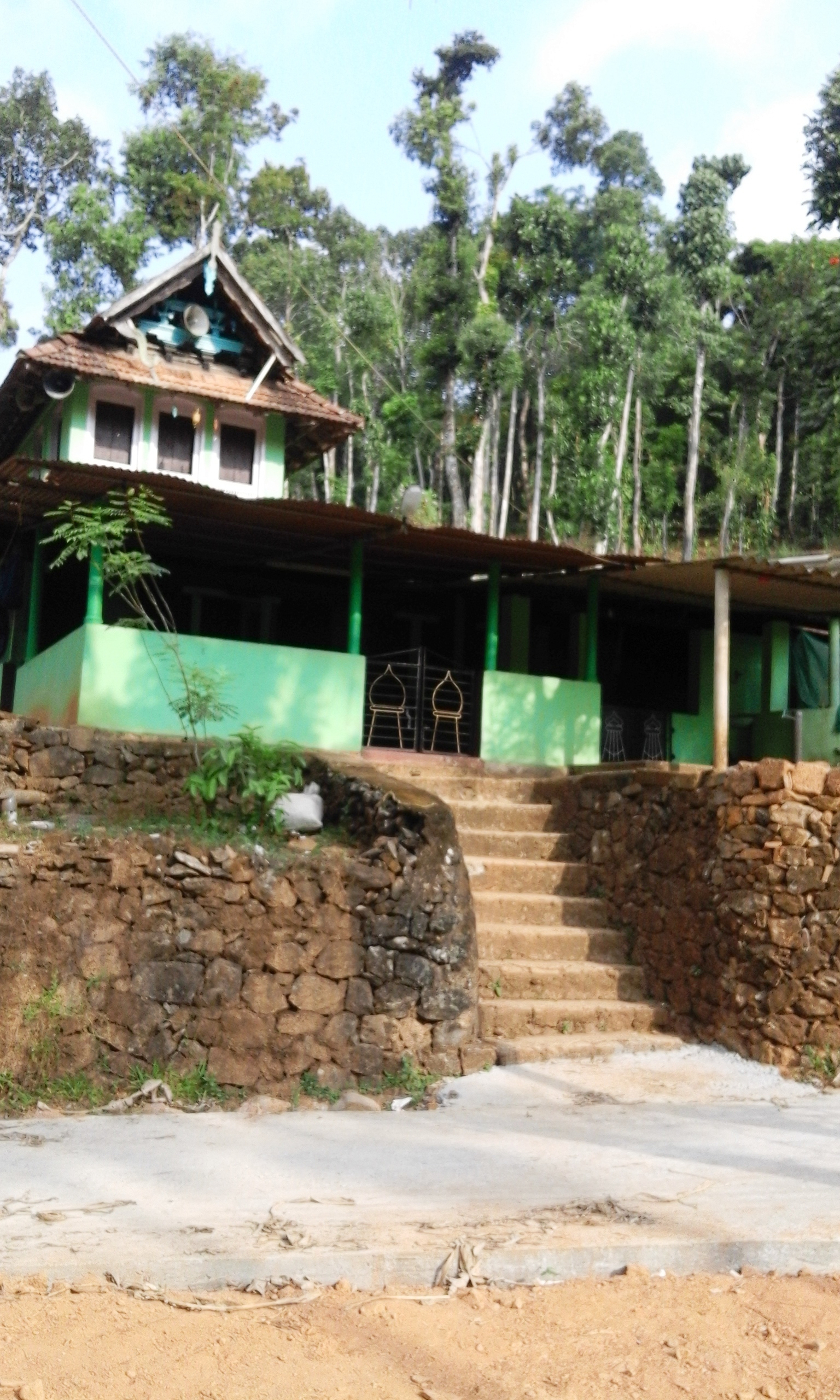
Ancient Srambia

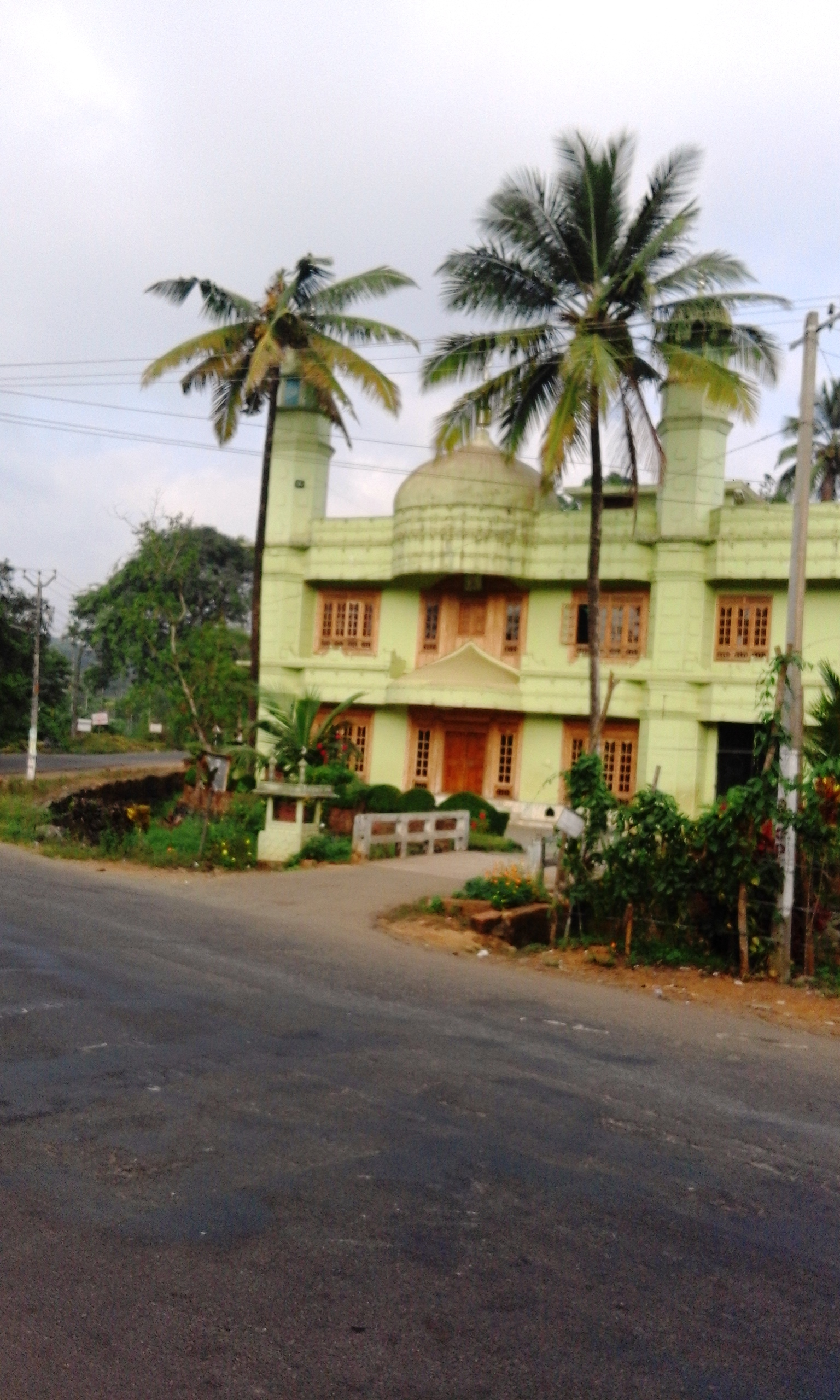
Town Sunni Mosque, Periya

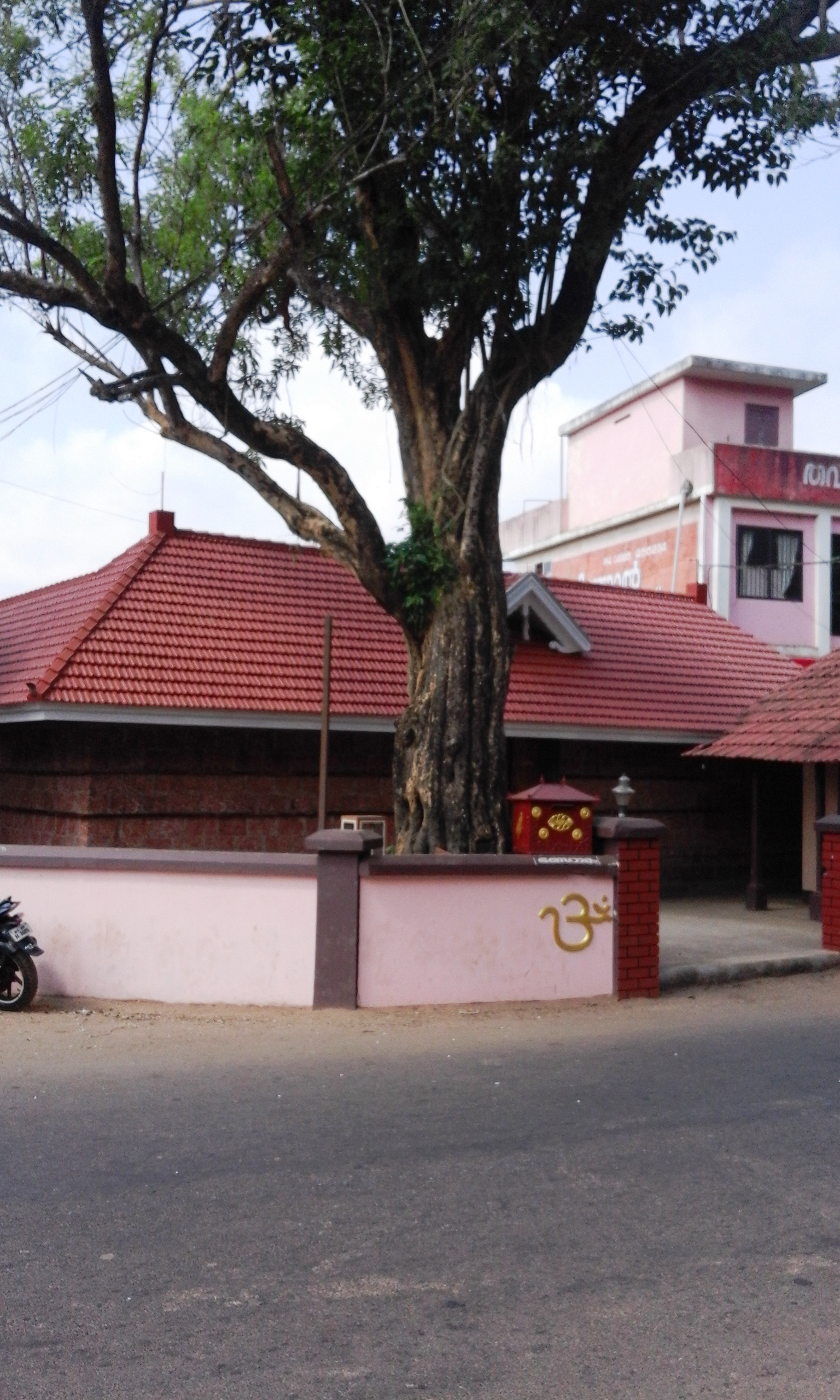
Durga Temple, Thalappuzha

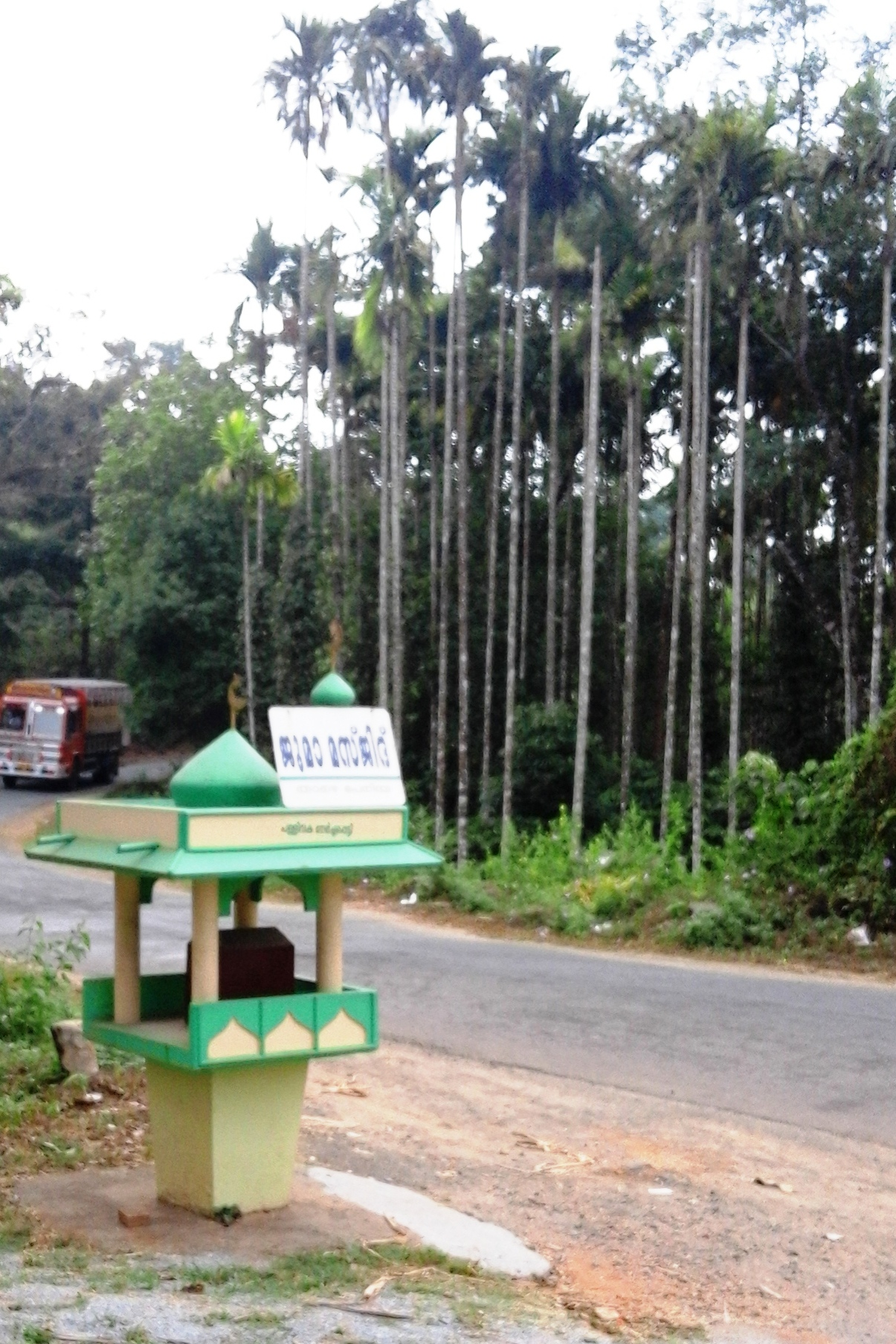
Thazhe Periya

== See also ==
- Boys Town, Mananthavady
- Palchuram
- Anjukunnu
- Oorpally
- Valat
