= Kurichiya =

Matrilineal tribe of Kerala, India

Kurichiya or Kurichiyar also known as Hill Brahmins or Malai Brahmins are a matrilineal tribe of Kerala distributed mainly in Wayanad and Kannur districts of Kerala, India. Kurichiyans are one of the Scheduled Tribes of Kerala practicing agriculture.

== Source of name ==
The name Kurichiyan was given by the Kottayam Raja to this class of people as they were adepts in archery and shooting. The word Kurichiyan is derived from two words kuri (target) and chiyan (people).

== Society and culture ==
Generally their houses are found in clusters and cluster of houses in one settlement is called Mittom also known as Tharavadu. A lineage head called Karanavar heads a Mittom. In addition to Karanavan, Kurichiya society includes medicine man, and other social functionaries such as Pittan. Joint family system is common among the Kurichiyan. Society is divided into lineages headed by lineage heads. A female initiation ritual called the pandal pattu is performed before a girl’s menarche and after the ear boring ceremony among the tribe.

Wives stay with the husband, but children only until 5–6 years, then they go to their mother's house.

Wives stay Among the Kurichiyas, a husband may divorce his wife any time he likes, but the wife has to bring her case before the elders if she wants to leave him, and they decide the case.

The Kurichiyans bury their dead; an arrow is buried with the body if a male, and a scythe if a female. The funeral ceremony on a grand scale is observed at any time convenient in the year. They have no priests, instead the elders act for the occasion. The deceased ancestors are remembered and once a year, toddy, meat, etc., are placed in a room for their use and subsequently enjoyed by the Kurichiyans. They occupy the highest status among the Wynad tribes in point of caste, they do not take meals of any castes. Their houses are supposedly polluted if any other caste man should enter the same, and the slightest suspicion is enough to put a man or woman out of the caste. These outcastes have, on such occasion, been taken to the Christian fold.

The Kurichiyas worship some of the same deities as other Hindus in Kerala, such as Kuttichathan and Vettakkaran, and Kali (also called Mariamma). The Kurichiyas worship their deceased ancestors, called Nizhal (shadows) as well as a number of deities unique to their tribe. They worship Malakkari (Kari of the hills) and the fierce Mother-Goddess Karimpili (the dark one from the hills). Offering to the deities is given after the harvest in either of the two methods Thera or Koll. For the Thera, the platform or shrine where the puja (worship) is to be performed is purified by holy water from a Brahmin's hands, and a Kurichiyan dressed up for the occasion, with a white head-dress, acts as an oracle. The KumbTiam-Vettal (cutting the vessel) then takes place, the Muppen-headman cutting a bamboo piece full of toddy. Then all similar bamboo pieces in which toddy will have been brought are emptied and the contents consumed. In the offering known as Koll, beaten rice, plantains and jaggery are placed on a plantain leaf at the shrine and the Muppen, after prayers, distributes them.

== Legendary origin ==
According to tribal myth, in the distant past before creation, they sky was on the top and the Earth lies far below covered by the sea. At that time Vadakkari Bhagavathi, the Kurichiya deity had a dream in which the almighty ordered her to find out a place to create 1001 castes. God also allowed her to move the sea side wards and then starts work. Young virgins were given as labourers. On completion of the work the worker went out to meet the God and asked for remuneration. But he objected to give the remuneration before examining the quality of the work. God created a bird called Chenthamarapakshi ( bird form a red lotus ) and asked the bird to fly around the Earth and find out the quality of the work. After examination the bird found out a fault that in one place the work was incomplete. Two hills were standing close to each other without touching one another. There was also water in between these hills. On both the hills god created and placed 18 human castes, different types of animals and plants. Kurichiya believe that they are one among them.

== History ==
The traditional account of the Kurichiyars advent into Wyanad is that the Kottayam Raja brought them for fighting the Vedar rulers Arippen and Vedan. Their caste-men would not take them back and they settled in Wynad and in the hilly parts of Kottayam. The number of families so settled is said to be 148. During colonial era, the Kurichya tribe has been well documented in their help of King Pazhassi Raja of Wayanad to fight against the British (during the last decades of the 18th century). Subsequent to the death of Pazhassi Raja, the Kurichiyars and Kurumbers in 1812 unsuccessfully revolted. Kurichiyas thus represent a tribal community that was brought into the Wyanad as mercenary soldiers, settled there as agriculturists a century back, defied British power, and found themselves compelled to earn their living as labourers due to lack of access to education. Today, Kurichiyans are one of the Scheduled Tribes of Kerala. Descendants of the Kurichiya tribes that fought the British alongside Pazhassi Raja have their settlements in and around Banasura Hill. In fact there are four tribal villages lying close to Banasura Hill, three belonging to the Kurichiyas and one belonging to the Paniyas. The Kurichiyas present here helped in the construction of Banasura Hill Resort.

== Caste relations ==
The Kurichiya consider themselves higher than all other social groups around them, to include even the Brahmin. They observe the "highest levels of ritual purity", considering even the touch of a Nambuthiri Brahmin to be polluting.
