= Tharuvana =

Village in Kerala, India

- Village
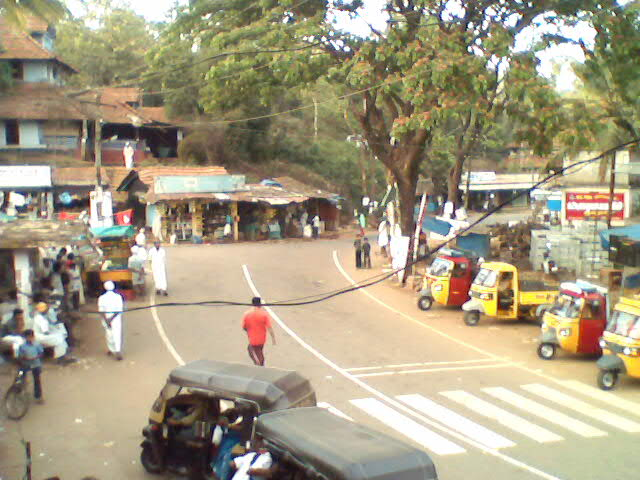
- A view of Tharuvana town from Vythiri-Tharuvana road

- Location in Kerala, India Tharuvana (India)
- Coordinates: 11.7350°N 75.9826°E
- Country: India
- State: Kerala
- District: Wayanad

Government
  - Type: Ward belonging to VellamundaGrama Panchayat
  - Member of Legislative Assembly: O. R. Kelu (Communist Party of India (Marxist))
  - Member of Parliament: Vacant

Languages
  - Official: Malayalam,
- Time zone: UTC+5:30 (IST)
- PIN: 670645
- Telephone code: 04935
- Vehicle registration: KL 72
- Nearest city: Mananthavady

Tharuvana is a village in Vellamunda Panchayath of Wayanad district, Kerala, India. The place is a junction connecting the Vythiri-Tharuvana road to State Highway 54 running between Kuttiady and Mananthavady.

== Etymology ==
The word "Tharuvana" is derived from Malayalam words "tharu" (meaning "please give") and Anna, as this place acted as a tax collection point during the British Raj.

== History ==
The history of Tharuvana dates back to the Pazhassi Raja dynasty. After the fall of Tipu and Pazhassi Raja, British administration accelerated the efforts in building roads, including the Kozhikode/Thalassery, which is extended up to Ooty through Gudalur and Mysore in Karnataka. They encouraged cultivation of cash crops including Pepper, Tea, Coffee in the region. However, Rice / paddy cultivation continued to dominate social life and economy of the people in region with the support of a harsh feudal social order systematically marginalizing and subjugating native tribal communities. During 1940s, there was a rampant food shortage that haunted the entire country, this increased the flow of migrants to Wayanad from Travancore and Cochin regions. They settled in the virgin lands and converted it to agricultural lands fighting acute weather conditions, wild animals and poverty.

Mazhuvannur illam and Mazhuvannur Siva Temple owned the majority of south east area of Tharuvana while Thonnampetta temple and its devotees owned the north west of Tharuvana in last century. Entire Tharuvana area which falls under Porunnannoore Village was ruled from Mazhuvannur illam by Mazhuvannur Kesavan Embranthiri during British Era

Paliyana Sree Manikadalayam temple four miles from Tharuvana is devoted to Lord Ayyapa on Parithiyatukunnil and symbolizes the communal harmony in this region, which is open to all irrespective of caste, creed and religion.

Kanal Aattam Mahostavam, the annual festival is held with splendour in the month of January every year and it attracts thousands of pilgrims to this hillock abode to seek spiritual blessings and solace.

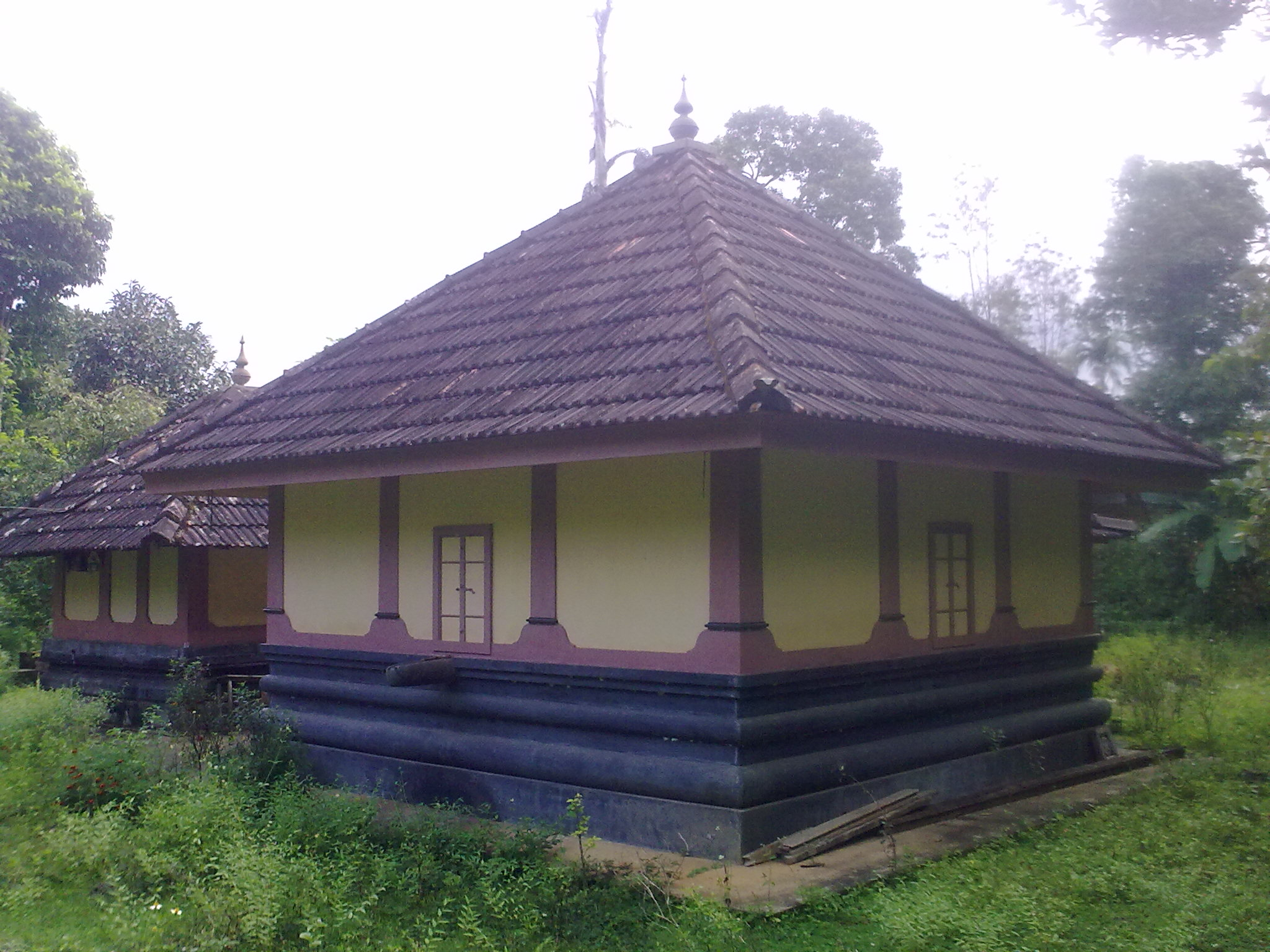
Mazhuvannur Temple, Tharuvana

== Transportation ==
Tharuvana can be accessed from Mananthavady or Kalpetta. The Periya ghat road connects Mananthavady to Kannur and Thalassery. The Thamarassery mountain road connects Calicut with Kalpetta. The Kuttiady mountain road connects Vatakara with Kalpetta and Mananthavady. The Palchuram mountain road connects Kannur and Iritty with Mananthavady. The road from Nilambur to Ooty is also connected to Wayanad through the village of Meppadi.

The nearest railway station is at Mysore and the nearest airports are Kozhikode International Airport-120 km, Bengaluru International Airport-290 km, and Kannur International Airport, 58 km.

== See also ==
- Mazhuvannur Maha Siva Kshethram
- Karingari
- Paliyana
- Manikanda Alayam Paliyana
- Kommayad
