= Thrissilery =

- village
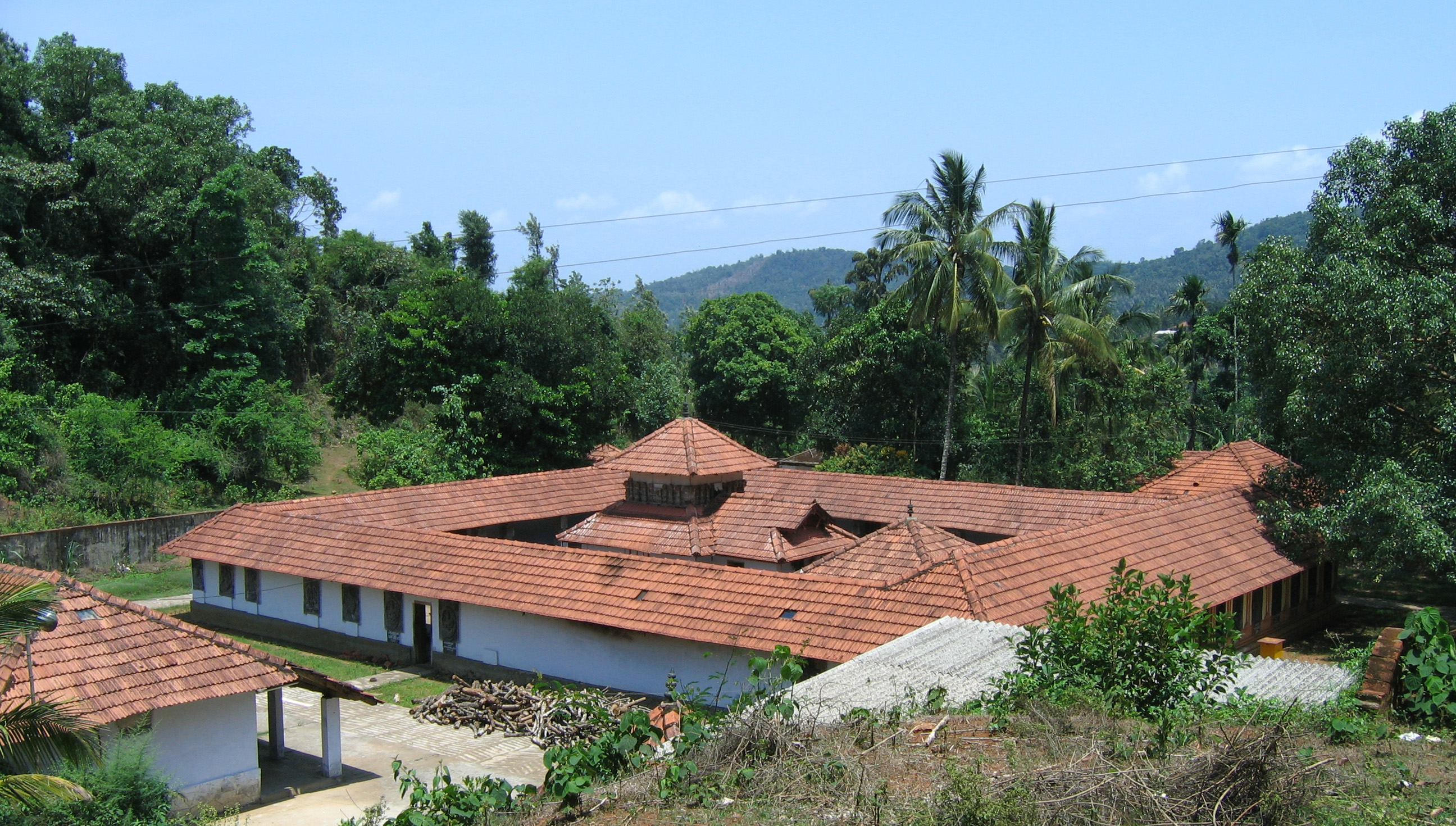
- Thrissilery Shiva Temple
- Interactive map of Thrissilery
- Coordinates: 11°50′0″N 76°2′0″E
- Country: India
- State: Kerala
- District: Wayanad

Population (2011)
  - Total: 16,818

Languages
  - Official: Malayalam, English
- Time zone: UTC+5:30 (IST)
- PIN: 670646
- ISO 3166 code: IN-KL
- Vehicle registration: KL-72
- Nearest city: Mananthavady
- Lok Sabha constituency: Wayanad
- Vidhan Sabha constituency: Mananthavady

Thrissilery is a village in Wayanad district in the state of Kerala, India.

== Demographics ==
As of 2011 India census, Thrissilery had a population of 16818 with 8267 males and 8551 females.

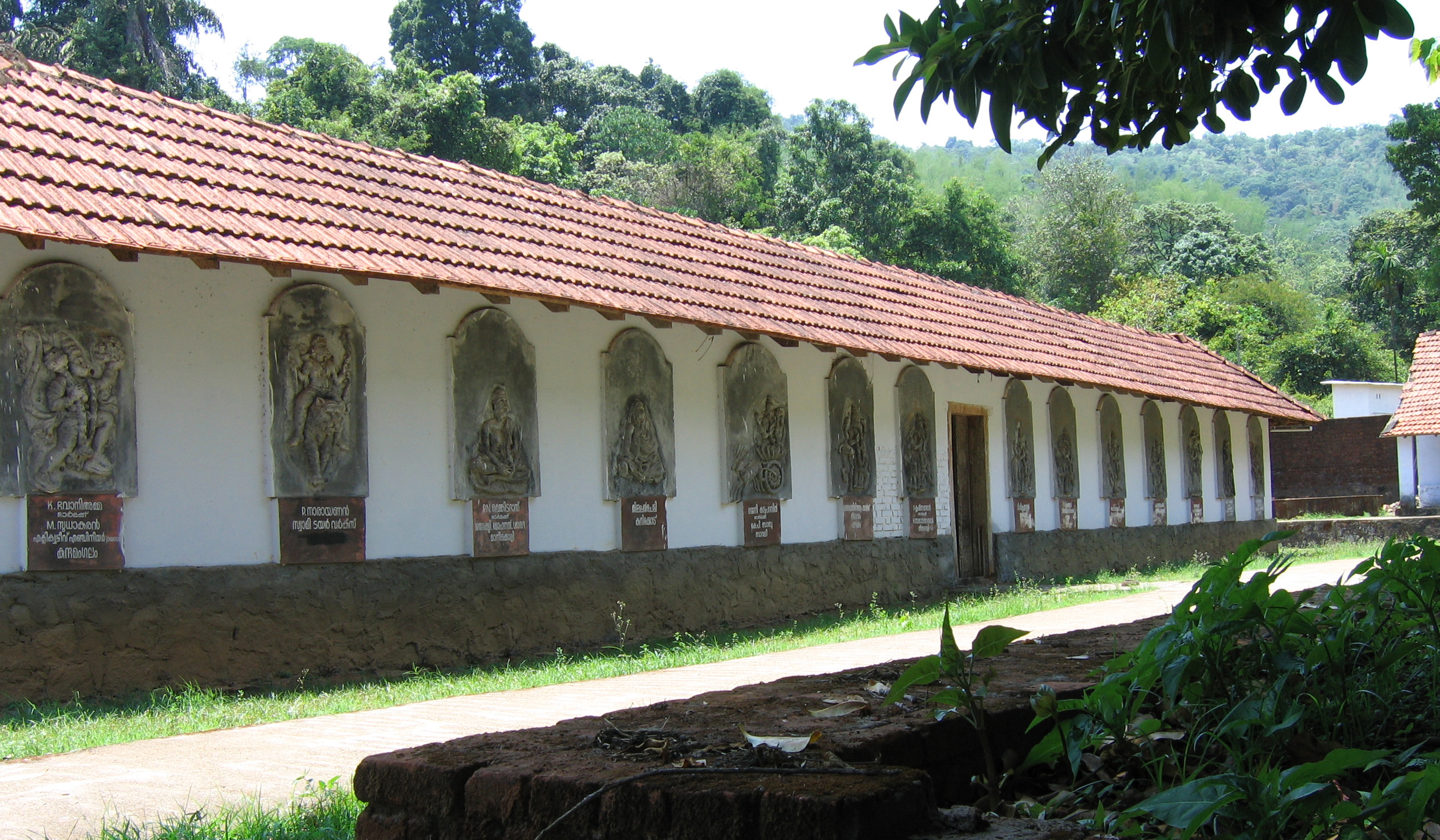
Shiva Temple

== Image gallery ==
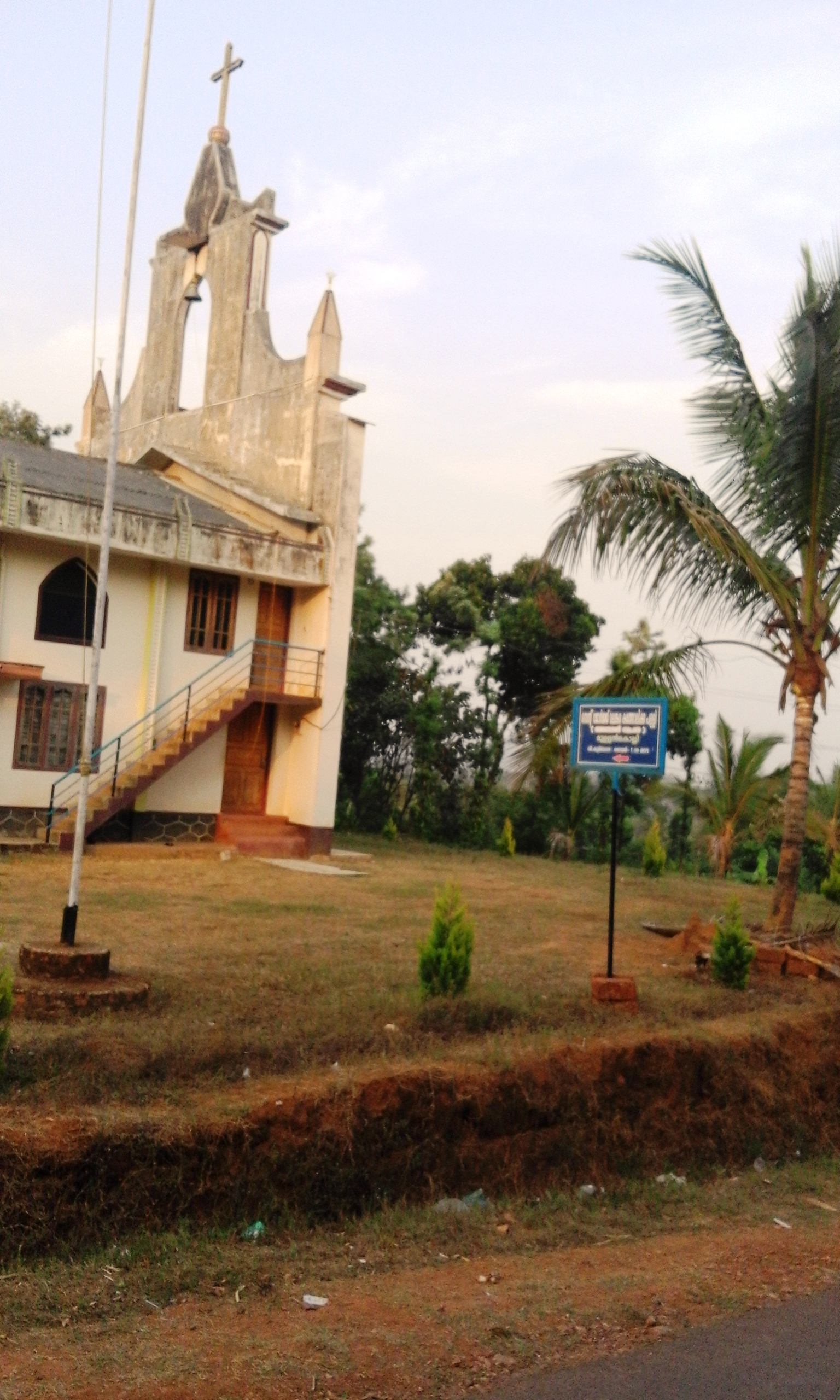
Mullenkolly Church

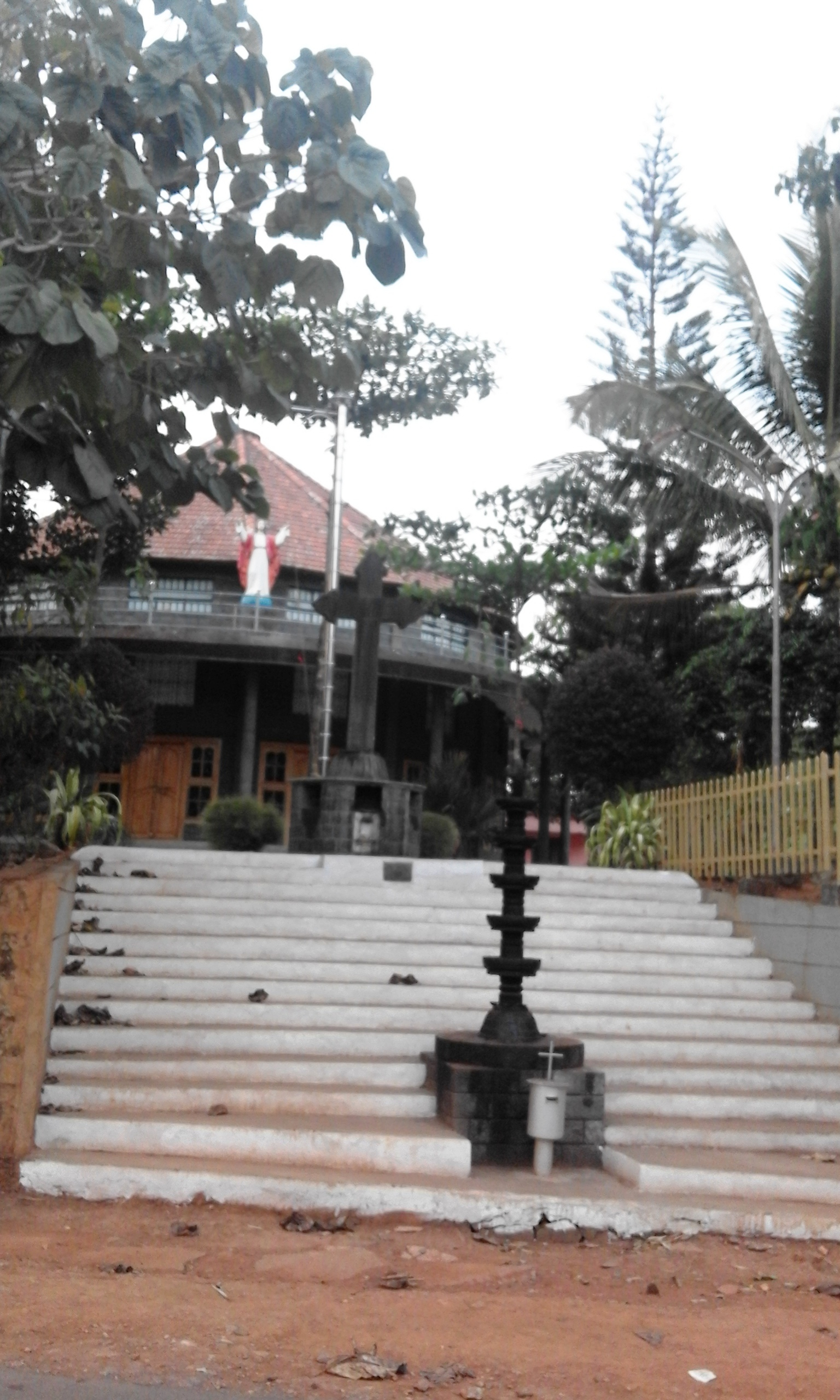
Edayoorkunnu Church

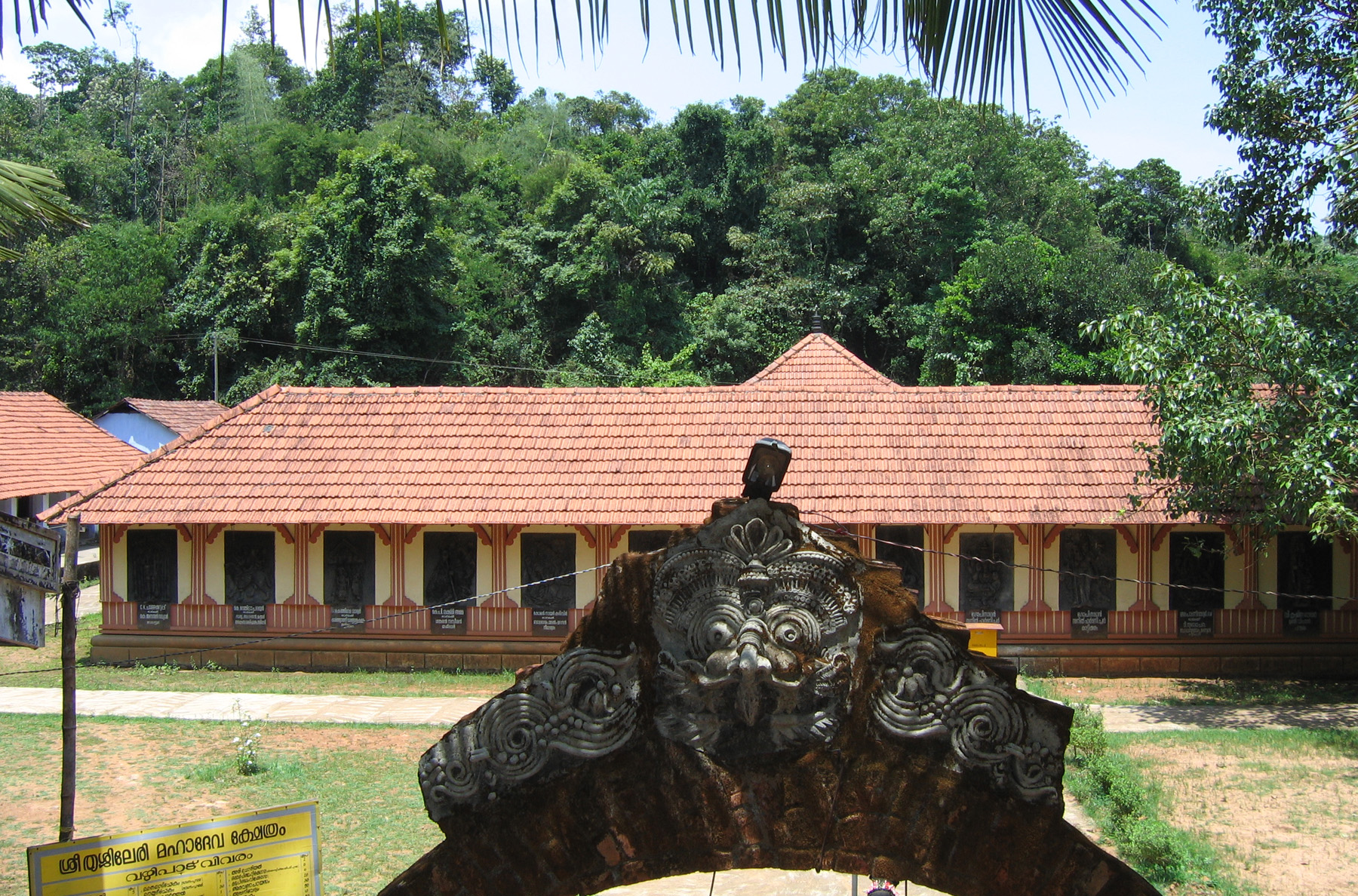
Shiva Temple
