= Anchukunnu =

Anjukunnu Anjukunnu
- village
- Location in Kerala, India Anjukunnu (India)
- Coordinates: 11.7463500°N 76.041490°E
- Country: India
- State: Kerala
- District: Wayanad

Population (2001)
  - Total: 18,049

Languages
  - Official: Malayalam, English
- Time zone: UTC+5:30 (IST)
- PIN: 670645
- Telephone code: 04935
- ISO 3166 code: IN-KL
- Vehicle registration: KL-72
- Nearest city: Mananthavady
- Literacy: almost 100%%
- Lok Sabha constituency: Wayanad
- Niyama Sabha constituency: Mananthavady

Anjukunnu (or Anchukunnu) is a village in Wayanad district in the state of Kerala, India.

== Demographics ==
As of 2001 India census, Anjukunnu had a population of 18049 with 9167 males and 8882 females.

== Ancient history ==
Anjukunnu is the current name for Payal Hills. Around the Christian Era, it was ruled by a Chera king named 'Vanjan'.
