= Oorpally =

- town
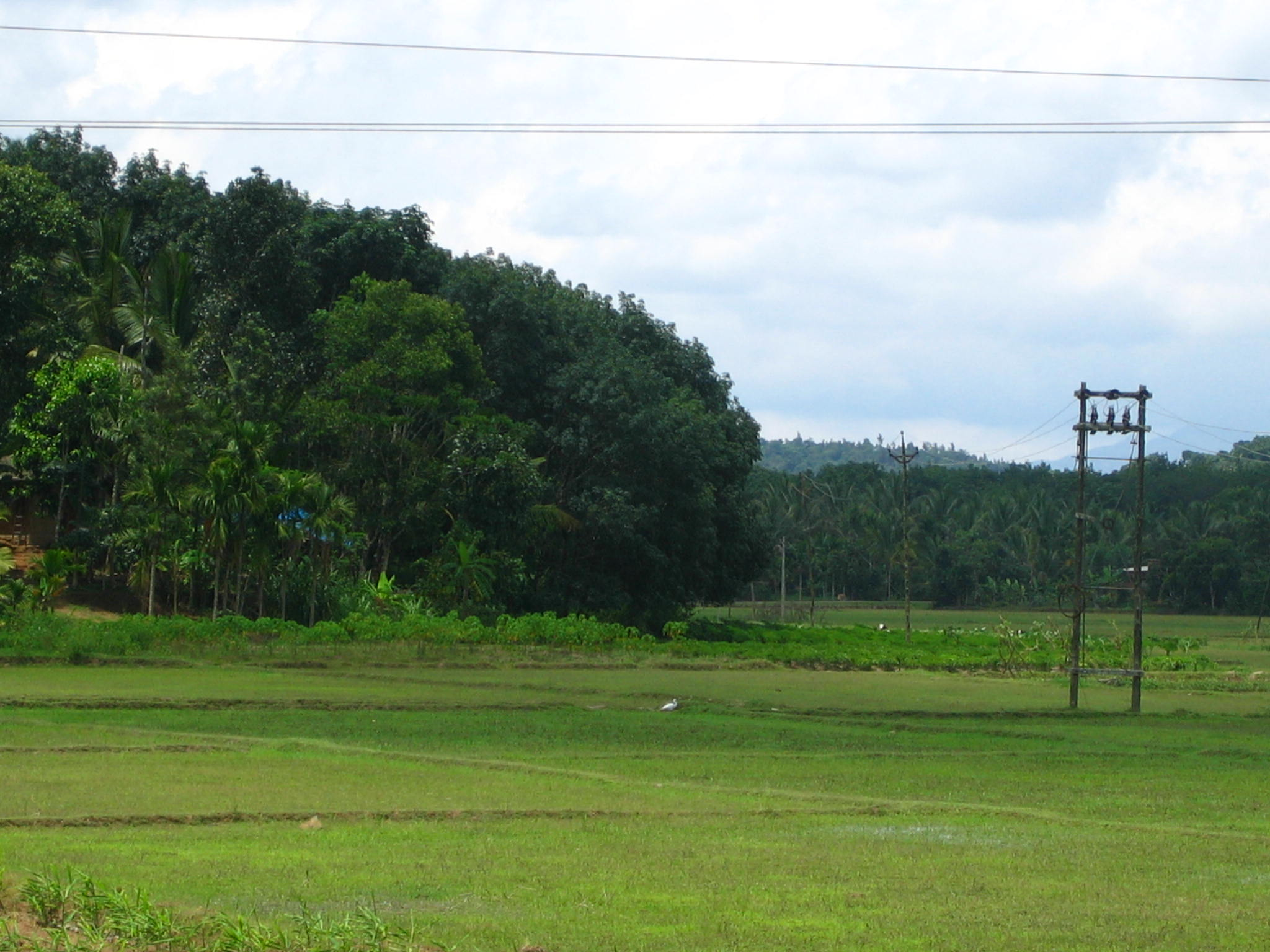
- Oorpally, Koyileri

- Location in Kerala, India Oorpally (India)
- Coordinates: 11°47′15″N 76°3′5″E
- Country: India
- State: Kerala
- District: Wayanad

Languages
  - Official: Malayalam, English
- Time zone: UTC+5:30 (IST)
- Vehicle registration: KL-72

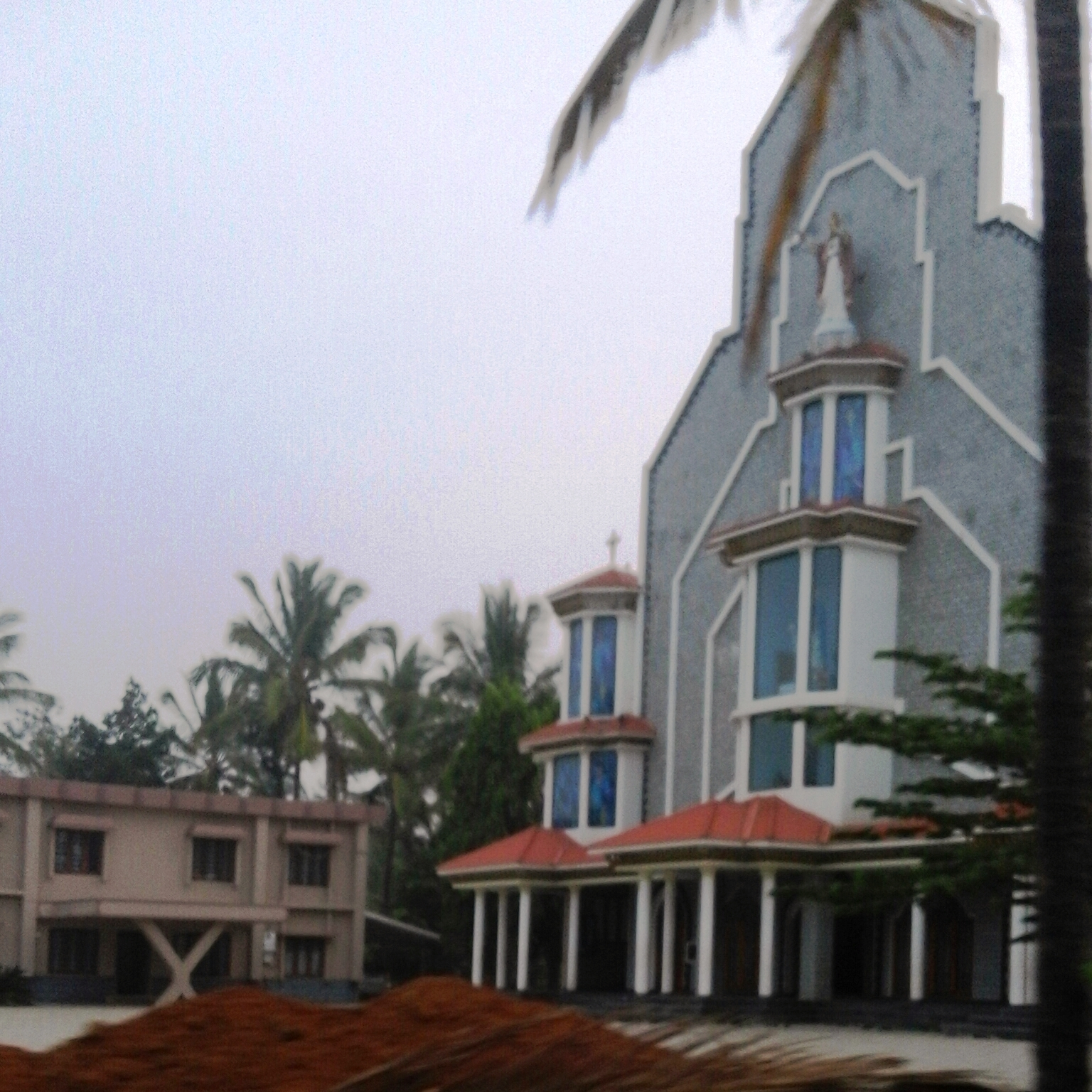
Payyampalli Church

Oorpally is a village near Koyileri, Mananthavady on the banks of the river Kabini in the Wayanad district of Kerala state, south India.
