= Papanasini stream =

Stream in India

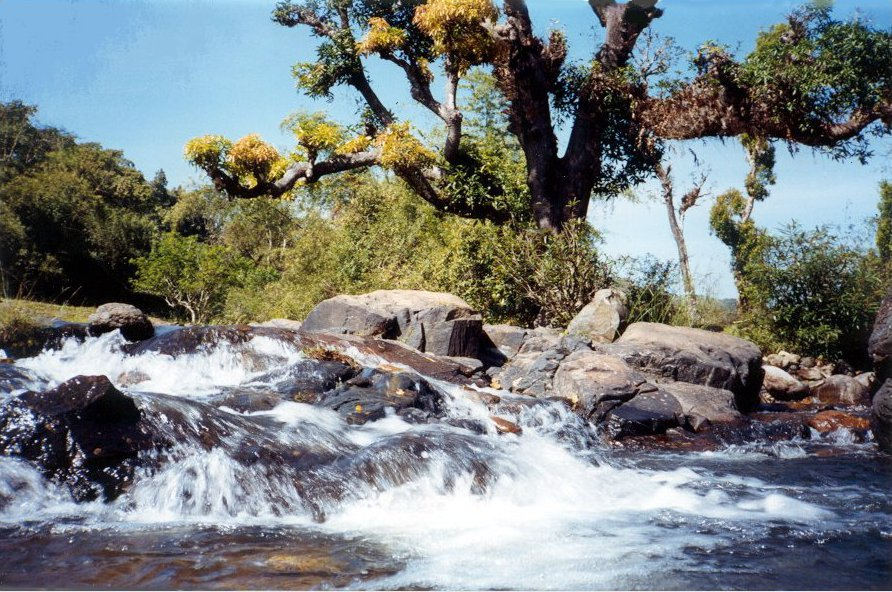
Papanasini Stream

Papanasini is the mountain stream in wayanad district of Kerala, India.

Rajiv Gandhi's ashes were immersed there.

== Geography ==
The river begins as a spring in the Brahmagiri Hills region near Tirunelli Temple.

== See also ==
- Appapara
- Thirunelly
- Palvelicham
- Valliyoorkkavu
