= Chettappalam =

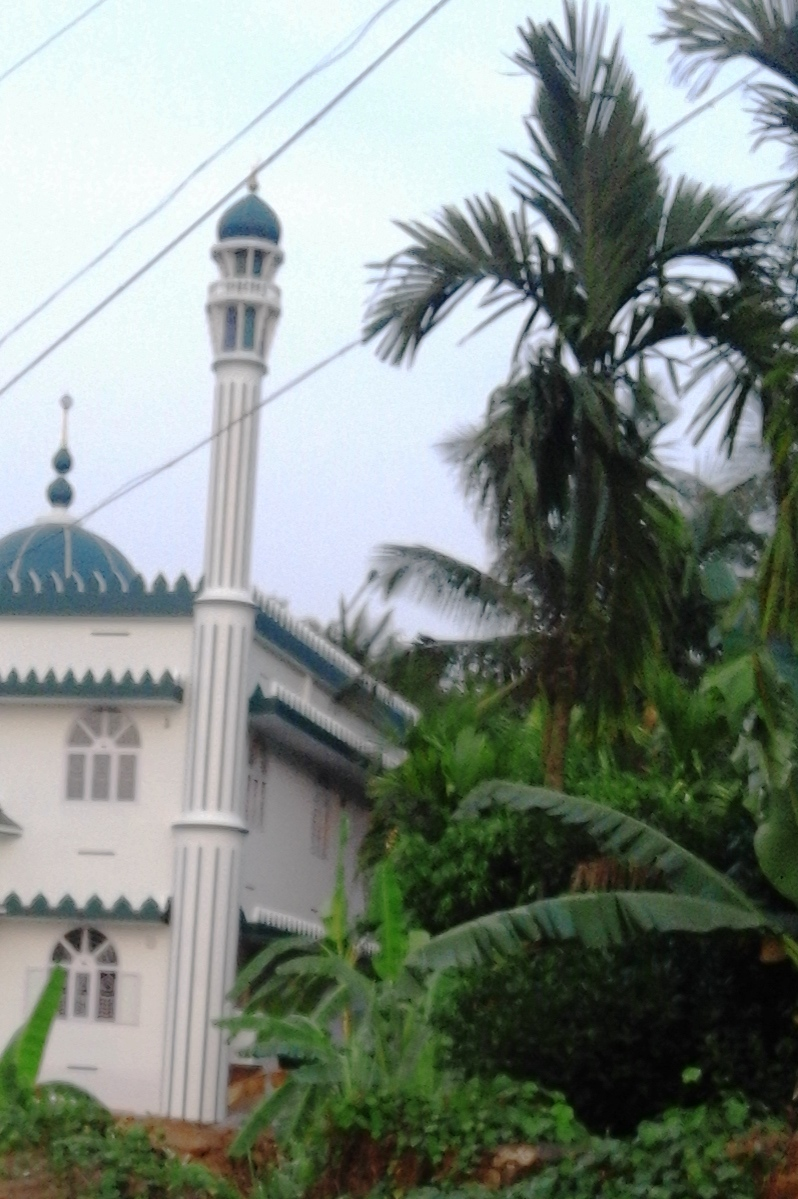

- Location in Kerala, India Chettappalam (India)
- Coordinates: 11.82077°N 76.01934°E
- Country: India
- State: Kerala
- District: Wayanad
- Time zone: UTC+5:25 (IST)
- PIN: 673579

Chettappalam is a small village on Mysore Road between Mananthavady and Kattikkulam in Wayanad district, Kerala state, India.

== Ondayangadi Junction ==
Ondayangadi junction is a busy town of Chettappalam area. The junction begins the road to Thrishilery temple and Manikanda temple, Anappara.

== Tourist attractions ==
Chettappalam is a village characterized by its agricultural landscape, featuring expansive paddy fields and undulating hills in the surrounding terrain.

== Places of worship ==
There is one Sunni Mosque, one Assemblies of God Church and several temples in Chettappalam.

== Education ==
- St Marys English Medium School, Chettappalam

== Transportation ==
Chettappalam can be accessed from Mananthavady town. The Periya ghat road connects Mananthavady to Kannur and Thalassery. The Thamarassery mountain road connects Calicut with Kalpetta. The Kuttiady mountain road connects Vatakara with Kalpetta and Mananthavady. The Palchuram mountain road connects Kannur and Iritty with Mananthavady. The road from Nilambur to Ooty is also connected to Wayanad through the village of Meppadi.

The nearest railway station is at Mysore and the nearest airports are Kozhikode International Airport-120 km, Bengaluru International Airport-290 km, and Kannur International Airport, 58 km.

== Image Gallery ==
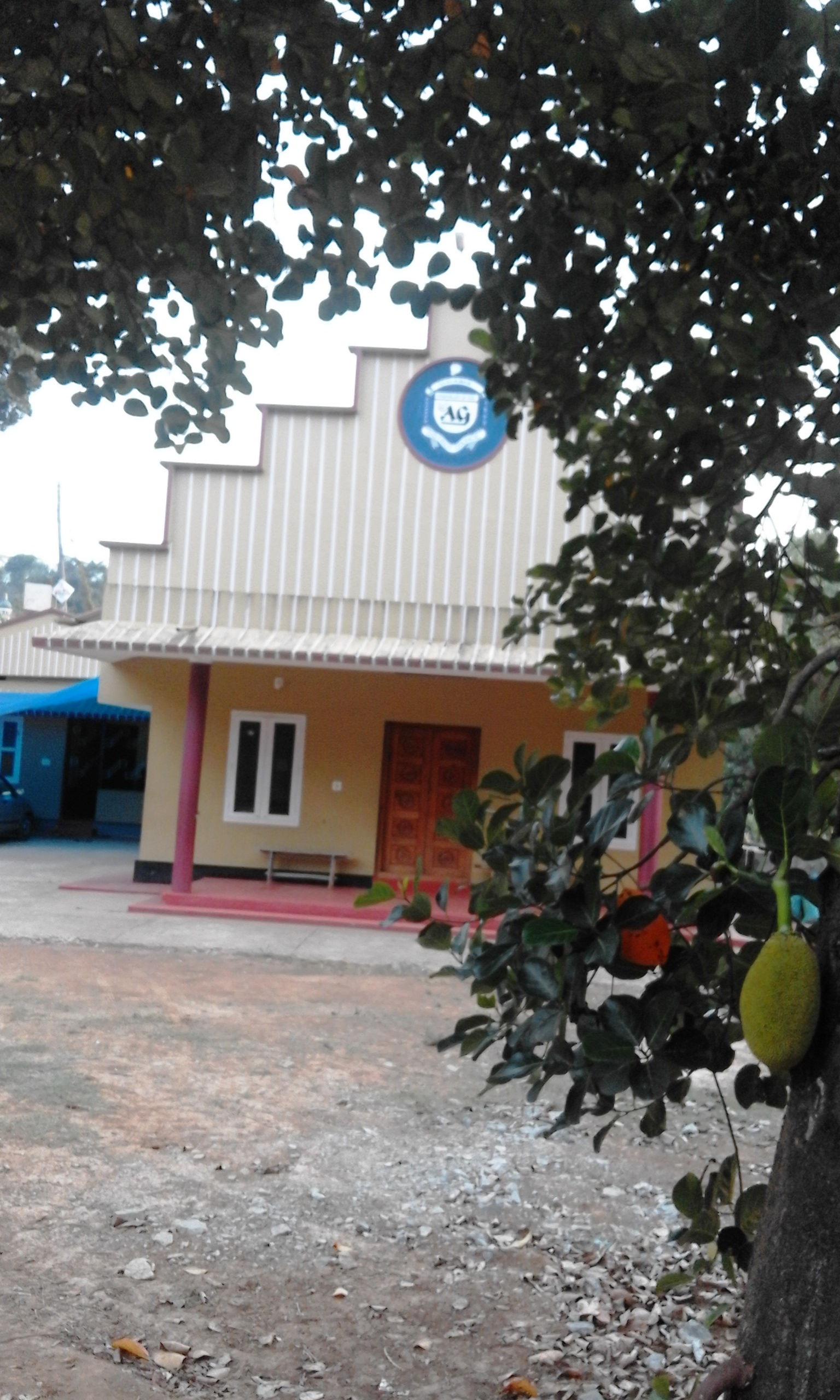
Assemblies of God Church, Chettappalam

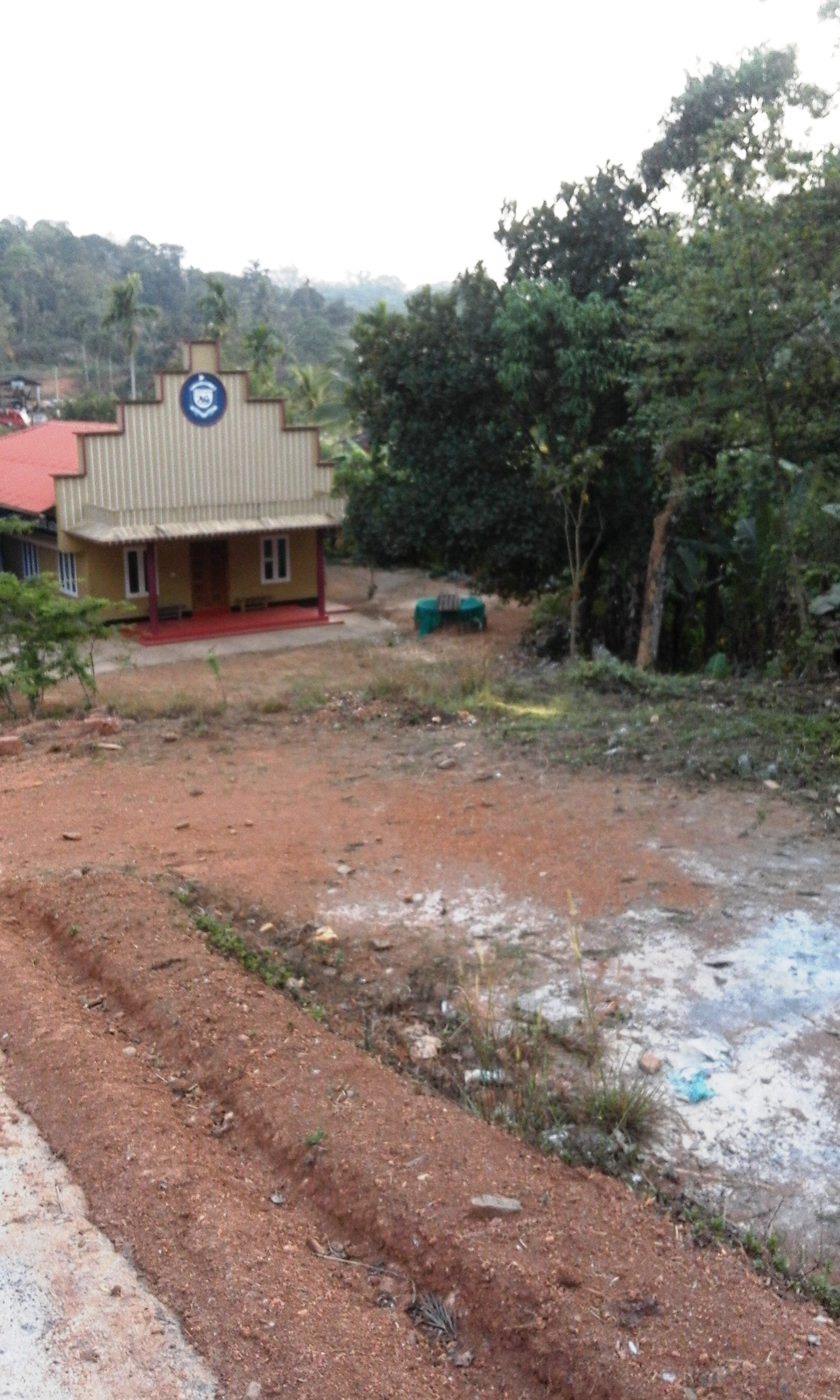
The steep path to the AG Church

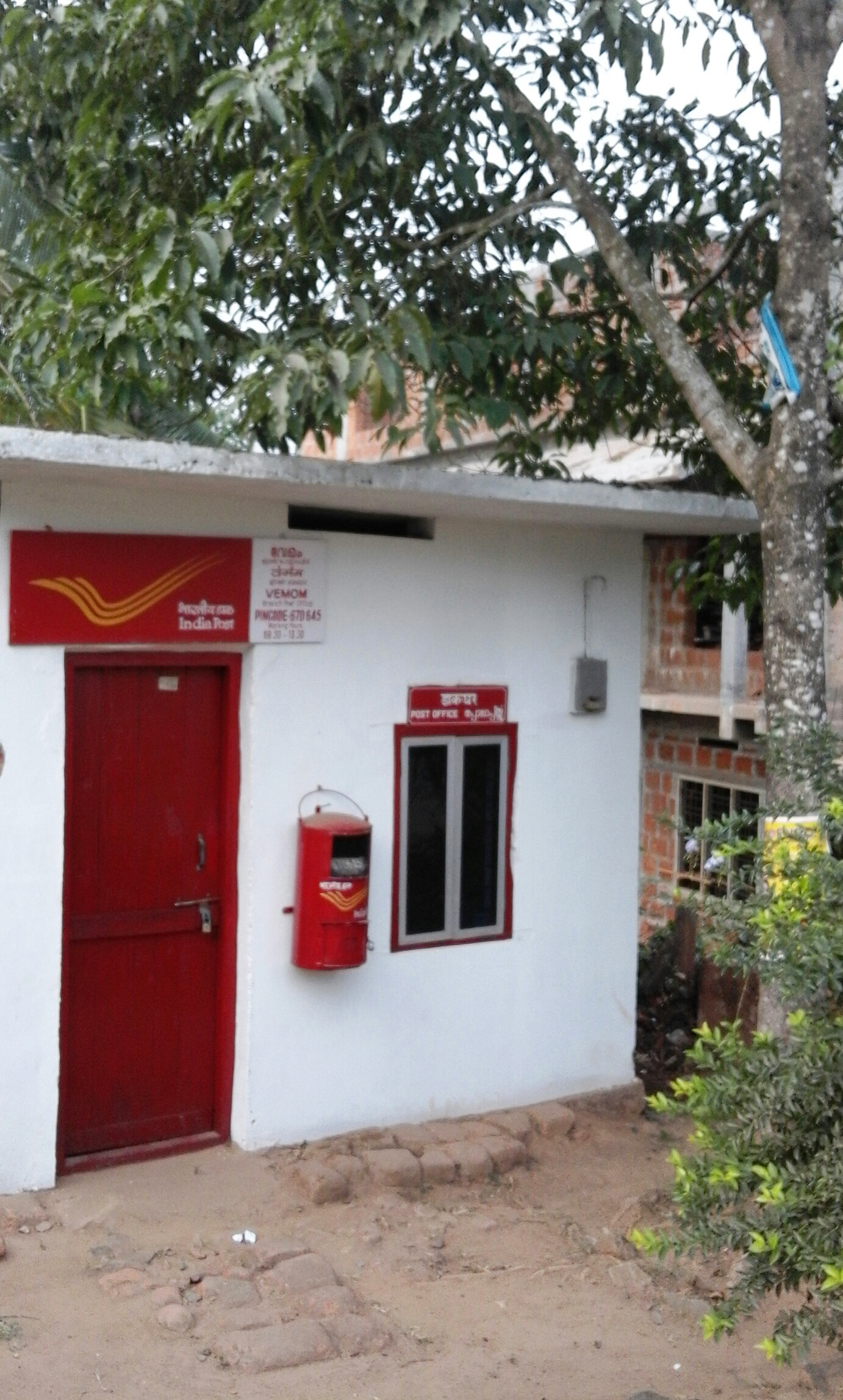
Post office at Ondayangadi

== See also ==
- Kattikkulam
- Thirunelly
- Mananthavady
- Valliyoorkkavu
