= Pakshipathalam Bird Sanctuary =

Bird sanctuary in India

Coordinates: 11.927498°N 75.997395°E

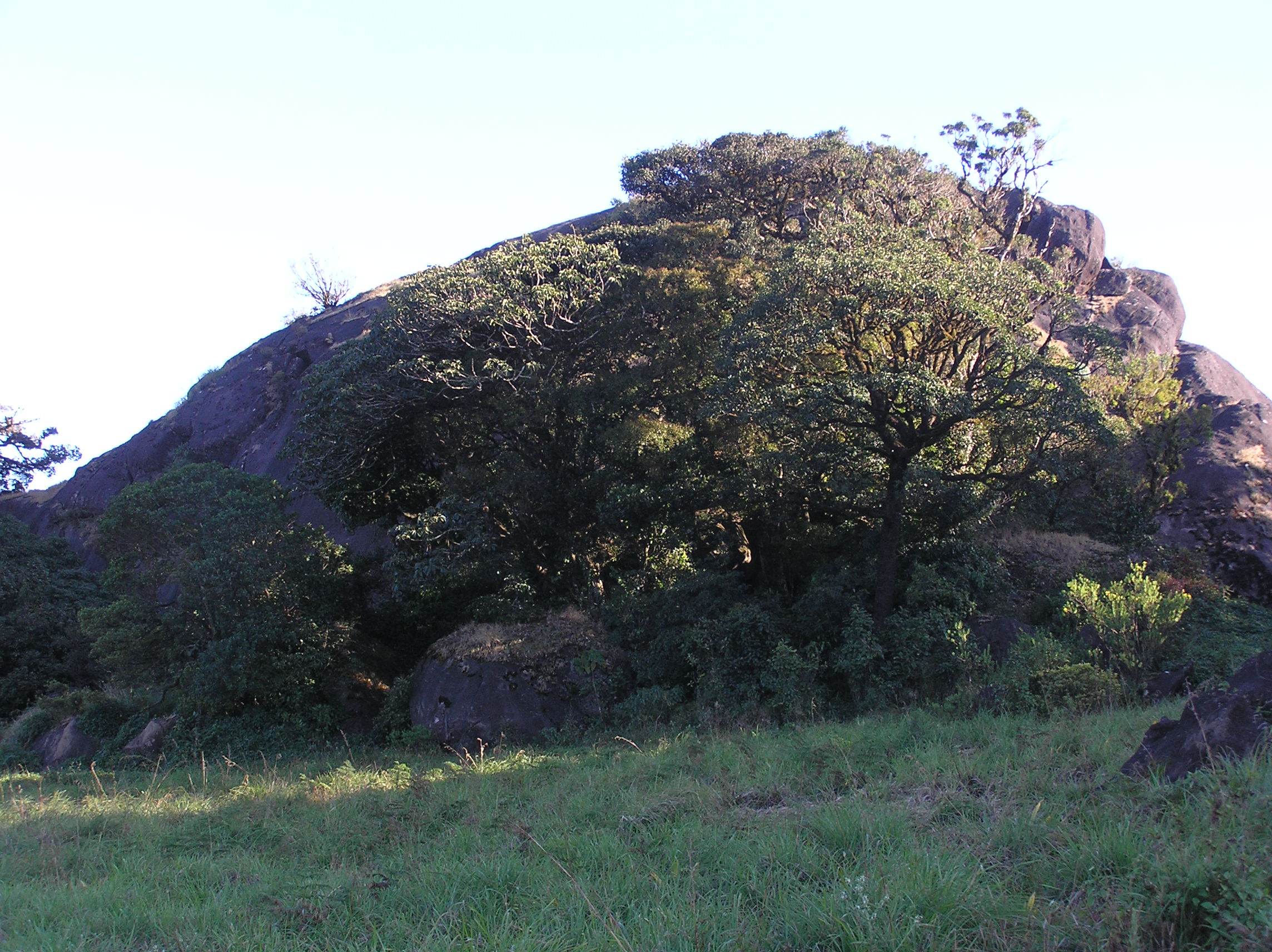
Munikal Caves (Pakshi Pathalam)

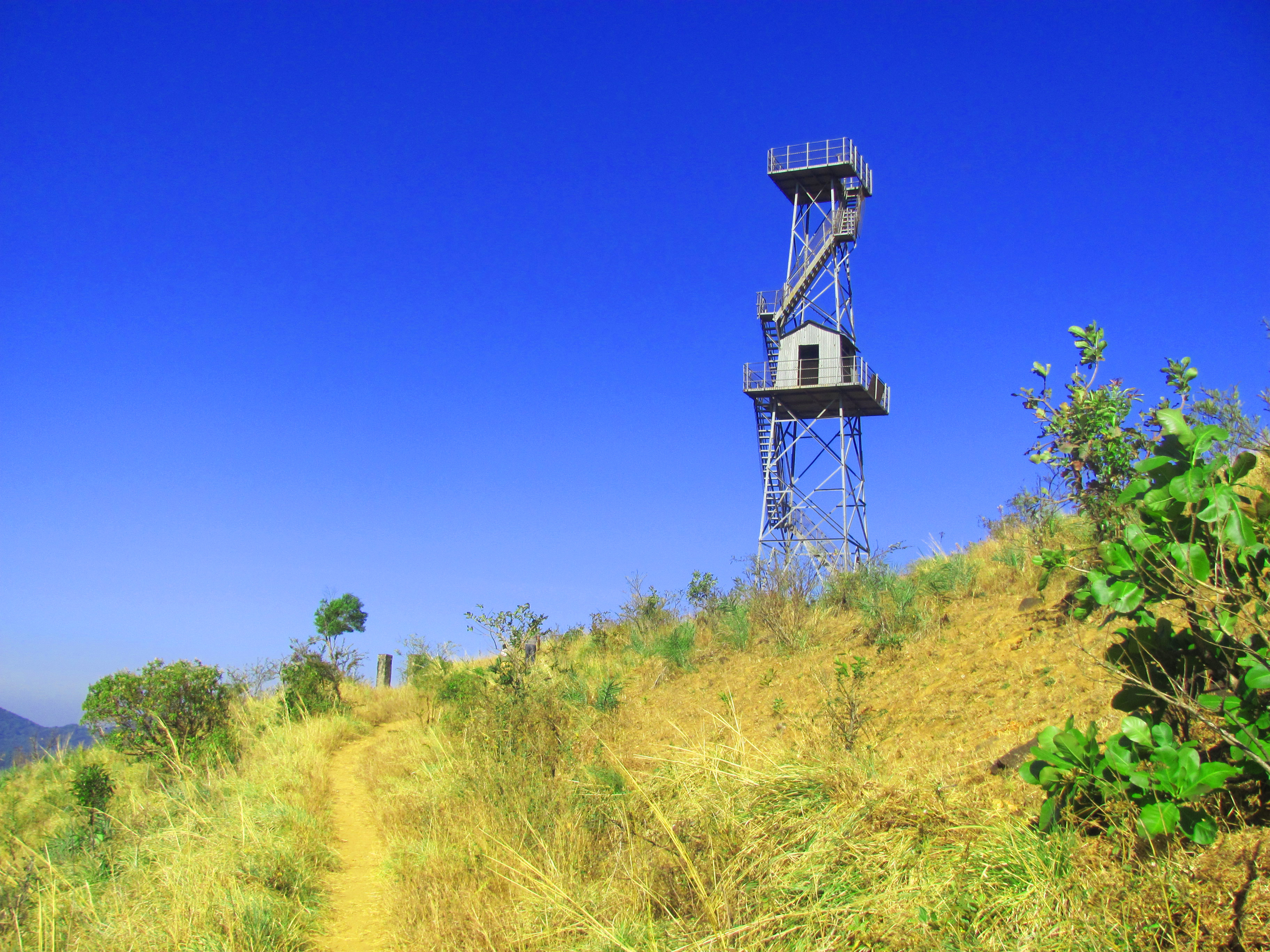
Pakshipathalam Watchtower

Pakshipathalam Bird Sanctuary is a bird sanctuary and a tourist location in Wayanad district of Kerala state, India.

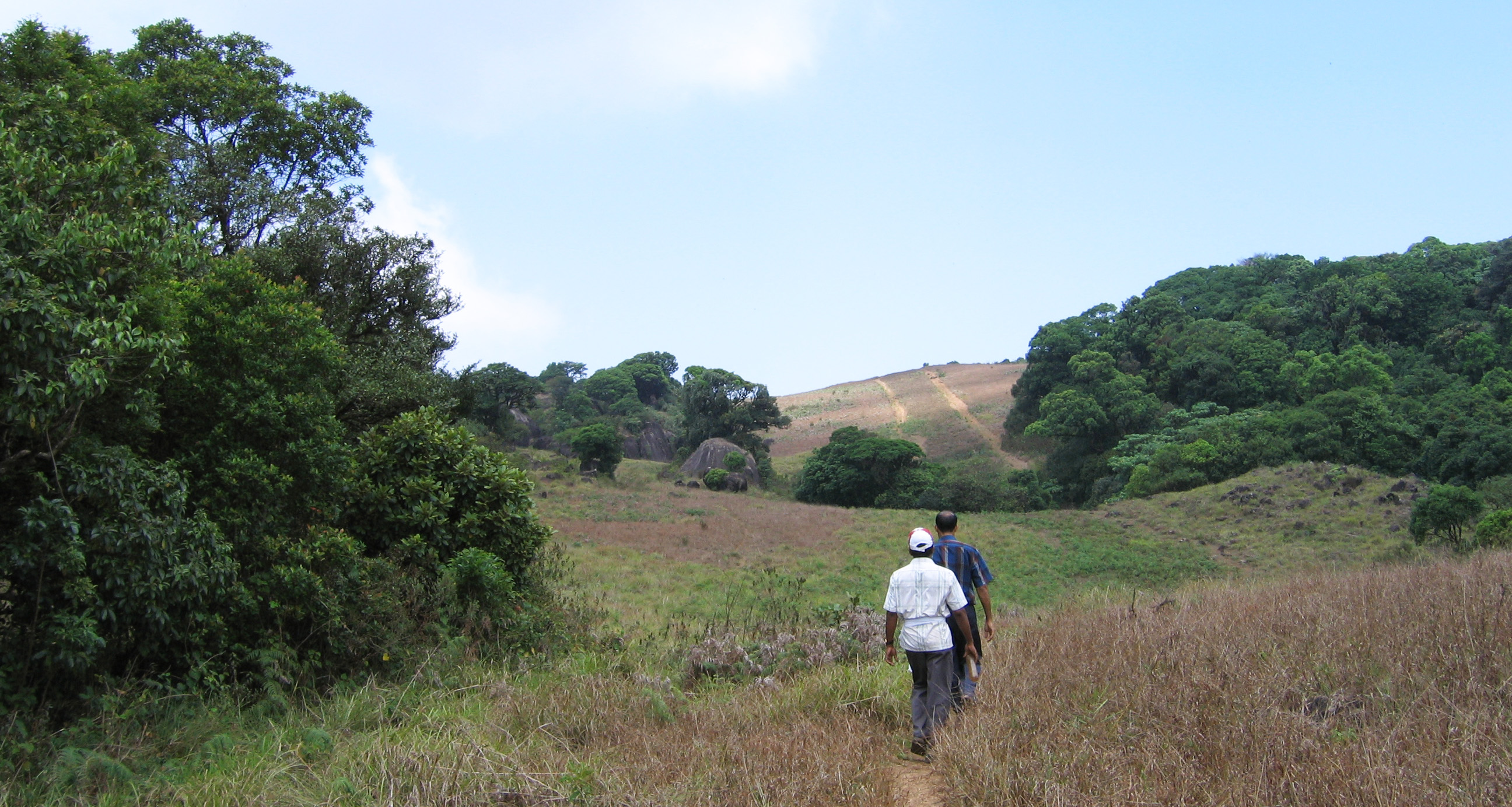
Trekking at Pakshipathalam

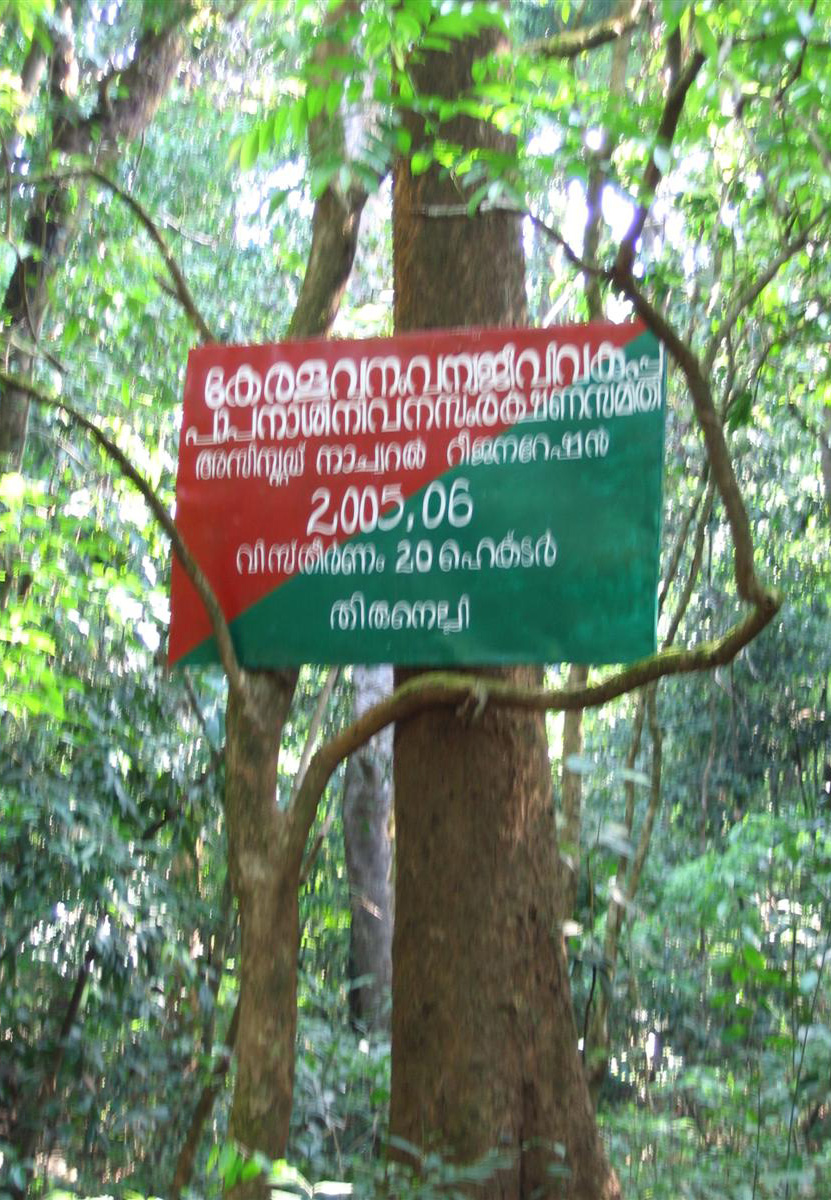
Kerala Forest Board on Pakshipathaam route

== Brahmagiri Hills ==
The Karnataka side of Pakshipathalam is called Brahmagiri Hills. This area is also accessible from Irupu Falls in Karnataka.

== Etymology ==
Pakshi means bird in Malayalam. Pathalam means the underworld of the demons.

== Location ==
Pakshipathalam Bird Sanctuary is located seven kilometers northeast of Thirunelli town. The hill is 32 kilometers away from the district headquarters of Kalpetta. The hill lies 1740 m above sea level. Papanasini River flows from Brahmagiri hill and irrigates the area. This river is believed to have the capacity to wash away all sins as the word 'papa' means sin and 'nashini' means destroy in Malayalam.

== Attractions ==
Pakshi Pathalam is rich in bird diversity. There is a cave here which is believed to be used by saints of olden times. The undulating hills of Pakshipathalam are also famous as a trekking site.

== See also ==
- Appapara
- Papanasini River
- Iruppu Falls
- Brahmagiri Hills
- Thirunelli temple
- Kattikkulam
