= Kakkodi =

- village
- Location in Kerala, India
- Coordinates: 11°19′56″N 75°47′18″E
- Country: India
- State: Kerala
- District: Kozhikode

Area
  - Total: 18.59 km^{2} (7.18 sq mi)

Languages
  - Official: Malayalam, English
- Time zone: UTC+5:30 (IST)
- PIN: 673611
- Vehicle registration: KL-76
- Climate: Tropical monsoon (Köppen)
- Avg. summer temperature: 35 °C (95 °F)
- Avg. winter temperature: 20 °C (68 °F)

Kakkodi is a Panchayat in the Kozhikode district of Kerala. The Panchayat borders Kozhikode corporation on one side and the kuruvattur, Chelannur, thalakkulathur and Elathur panchayats on the other sides.

== Population ==
As per the 2001 census reports the total population is 36,096 with 17,379 men and 18,717 women and the population growth is +20.22. The sex ratio is 1077 women to 1000 men.

== Demographics ==
Religion in kakkodi
Religion	Percent
Hinduism	62%
Islam	28%
Others	10%

Hindu constitute majority of the population, followed by the muslim communities.

== Education ==
Kakkodi panchayath has a couple of LP, UP and high Schools. They are

- Makkada Perinchila ALP School
- Badiroor LP School (AKA Kanipoth School)
- Madrassathul Islamiya L P School (Est: 1924)
- Makkada A LP School (AKA Kothadathu School)
- Mathrubandhu UP School
- Kakkodi Panchayath UP School (AKA Ottathengu School)
- MES Architecture College
- Govt UP School, Padinhattummuri
- Govt Higher Secondary School Kakkodi(Athazhkunnu)
- Kiralur AUP School Kiralur

These schools have produced many notable professionals living inside and outside of the Panchayath.

Students are enrolled in the schools of nearby panchayaths for education. PVS school, Ernhikkal and AKKR school, Chelannur are most popular.

The main town Kakkodi bazar has a couple of private colleges offering degree and +2 courses. There's a Vastuvidya college at Kottupadam very near to Kottukulangara Ayyappa Temple

As per 2011 census reports the area has literacy rate of 94.72% which is much higher than the national average 74%

== Tourism ==
One side of the Panchayath has a salt water river named Akalapuzha which is a starting point of Korapuzha. This shallow river is abundant with Shell fishes and with a breath taking Lake like view is very suitable for House boats etc. many local tourists spend their time around the area. A major investor is yet to promote this area and bring this into calicut's tourist map. Another important place in which you can spend time is GREENWORLD.As the name indicates, the place is covered by green.

== Other Amenities ==
The Panchayath had two Cinema theatres named Priya & Jayasree, of which Priya had been converted to an Auditorium. Jayasree now converted to Media One Channel Studio. There is a telephone exchange, Health center, and a Canara Bank all located in an area, which are at a walkable distance from the Bazar. There are three post offices in the panchayath namely Makkada [Kakkodi] and Kizhakummuri.one branch of State Bank of Indiais present at this panchayath

== Notable personalities ==
Makkada devadas is a popular Art Director who worked for many Malayalam films and TV Serials. Singer Arun gopan also a native. And famous dubai business man sachin Manohar,Kia Calicut manager Ambareesh, Medical Representative Abhirag, and Akshay Ram from uk are also living in kakkodi Kakkodi shanikaaa - popular playback singer of govt medical College Kannur

== See also ==
- Makkada
- Chelannur
