= Appapara =

Village in India

Coordinates: 11.904853°N 76.028561°E

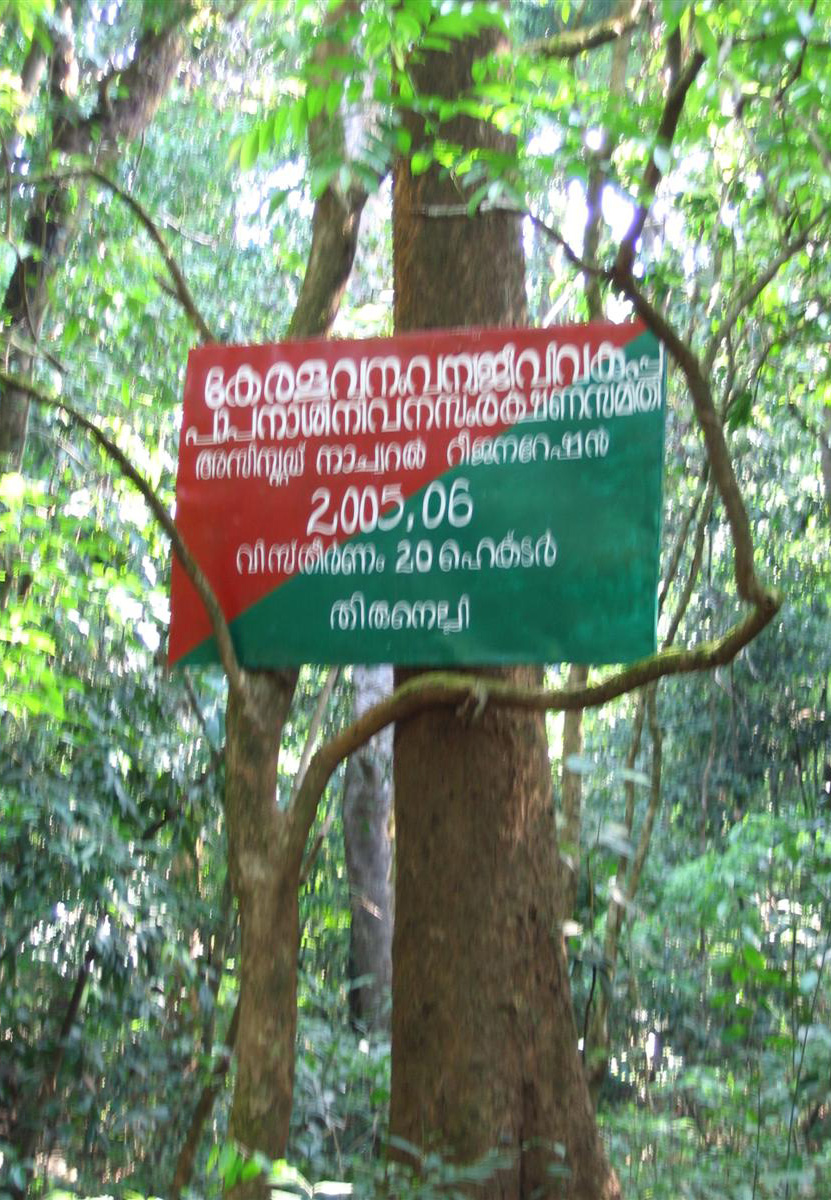
Kerala Forest Sign near Appapara

Appapara or Appappara is a small village in Wayanad district of Kerala state, India.

== Location ==
Appappara is located on the border between Kerala and Karnataka near to near Thirunelli Temple.

== Education ==
The nearest schools are Government Highschool Kattikkulam and Ashram school, Thirunelli.

== Administration ==
Appapara is part of Thirunelli panchayath. The pin code for Appapara village is 670646.

== Churches ==
There is one St. George Church in Appappara. It comes under the Syro Malabar church of Mananthavady.

== See also ==
- Papanasini River
- Iruppu Falls
- Brahmagiri Hills
- Thirunelli temple
- Kattikkulam
