= Paniya people =

Ethnic group in India

Paniya
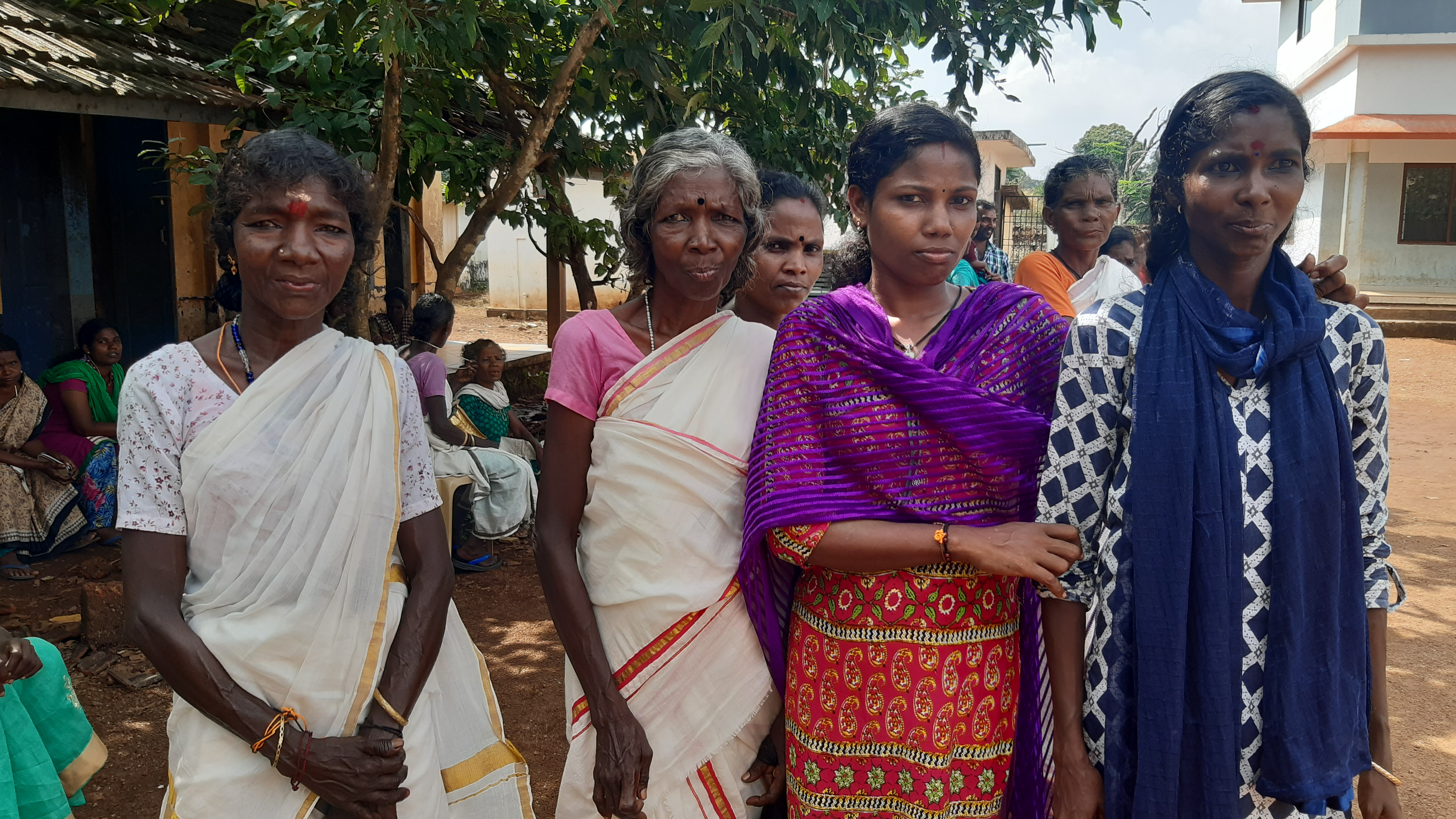
- Paniya women in Kerala

Total population
- 99,079

Regions with significant populations
- India
- Kerala: 88,450
- Tamil Nadu: 10,134
- Karnataka: 495

Languages
- Paniya language

Religion
- Hinduism, traditional religion, Christianity

Related ethnic groups
- Dravidian, Tamil, Malayali

The Paniya, also known as Paniyar, Panyer, and Paniyan, are an ethnic group of India. They constitute the single largest Scheduled Tribe in Kerala and are mainly found in the Wayanad District and the neighbouring areas of Karnataka. They primarily inhabit villages around edge of forestland in Kerala's Wayanad, Kozhikode, Kannur and Malappuram districts. The Paniya speak the Paniya language, which belongs to the Dravidian family, closely related to Malayalam. The centre of the bonding contracts was the famous temple of the regional mother goddess of the Valliyoorkkavu shrine near Mananthavady.

== History ==
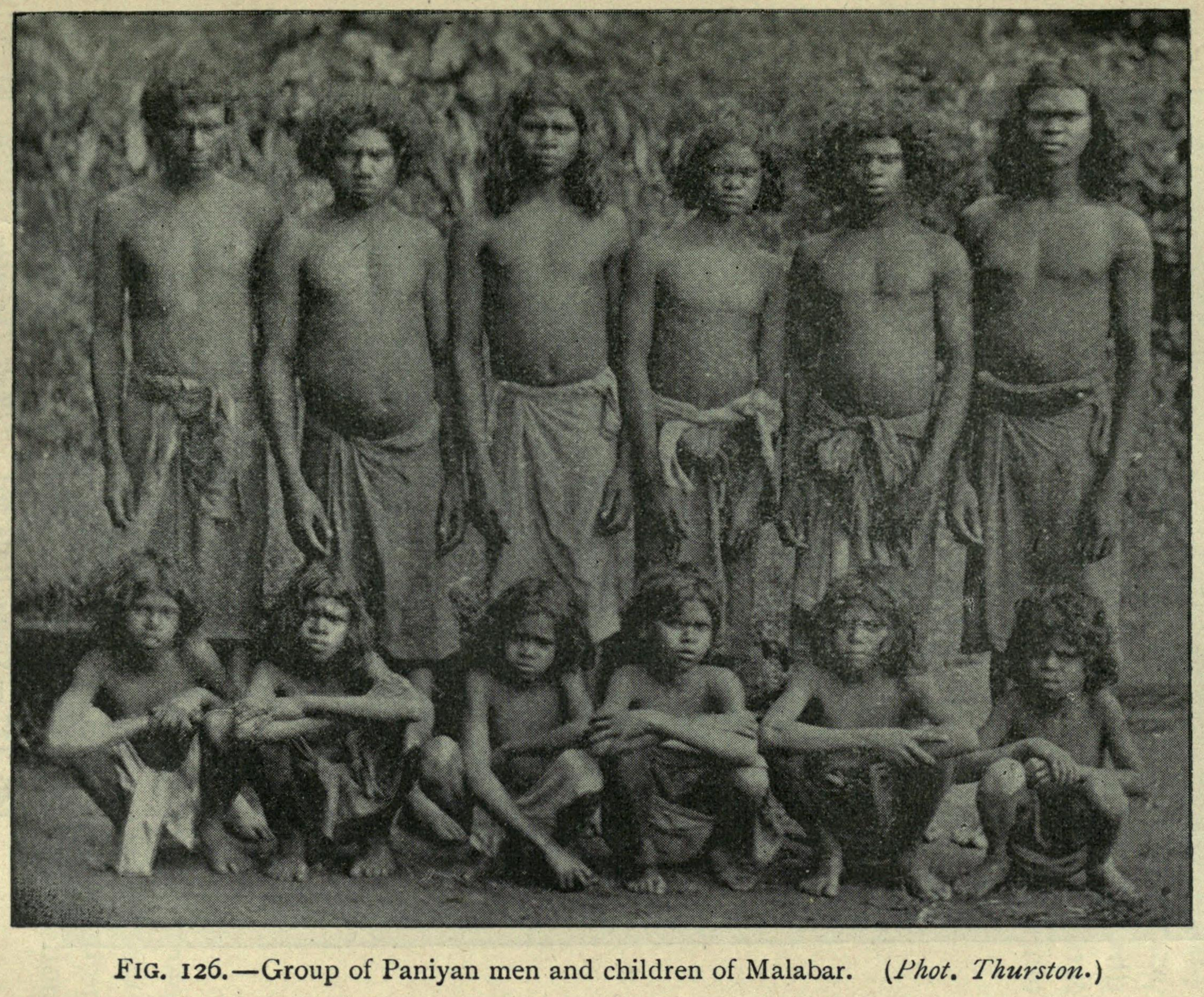
A group of Paniya men and children.

There is a theory that the Paniyas were brought to Wayand by the Jain Gounders who trained them to be agricultural labourers in their fields (Thurston, 1909).

The Paniya have historically worked as agricultural labourers. They are believed to have been brought to Wayanad by the king of Malabar, and thereafter tilled the land as serfs. Following the abolishment of the slave-holding system, the Paniya were resettled in different areas established by the government.

Paniyas were also historically reputed for their boldness and recklessness. For this reason, they were often employed as thieves.

The Paniya today are a scheduled tribe. One particular sub-group of theirs, the Kattupaniyar, inhabits the forest region of Nilambur in the Malappuram District. Here, members lead a traditional hunter-gatherer lifestyle.

== Demographics ==
The Paniya mainly inhabit Kerala, and the Wayanad, Kozhikode, Kannur and Malappuram districts of India. Others reside in Tamil Nadu, the area west of the Nilgiris hills, as well as the Kodagu District of Karnataka. Their total population depends on agriculture and agriculture labour for their livelihood.

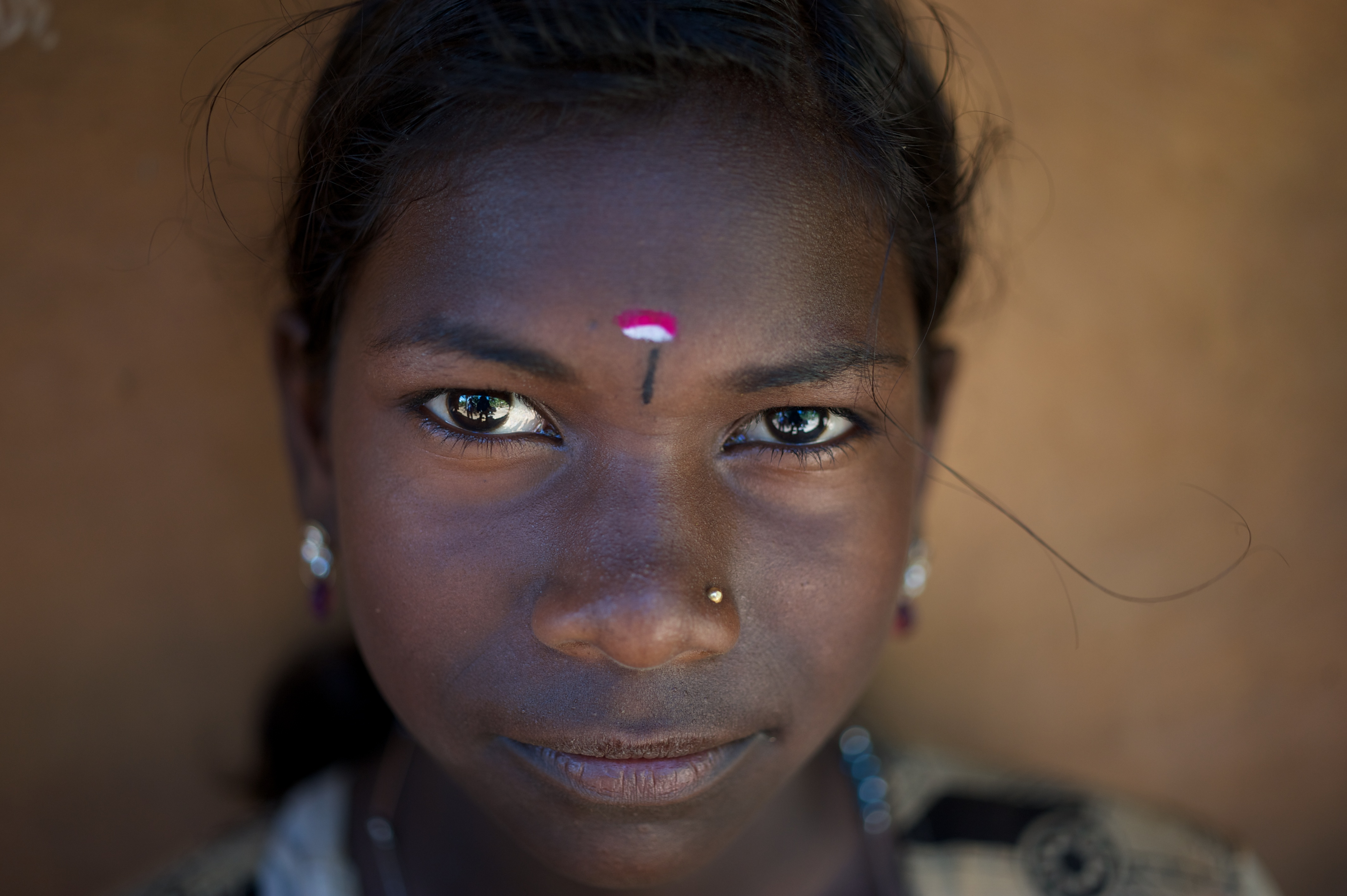
A Paniya girl.

Their population has remained unchanged during this decade (2003). and nearly 67,948 live in the Kerala hills, notably fringes of Western Ghats. People's Action for Educational and Economic development of Tribal People (PEEP) which has been working among Paniya settlers of Kerala since 2005 to promote literacy and improving economic status of the group.

== Language ==
The Paniya speak the Paniya language as a mother tongue. A member of the Dravidian family, it is most closely related to Malayalam, Kadar, Ravula and other Dravidian languages.

Paniya is spoken both at home and during religious ceremonies. Some Paniyas also use other Dravidian languages, such as Malayalam, Tamil or Kannada.

Paniyas use different writing systems depending on where in India they reside. Those in Karnataka use the Kannada script, those in Kerala write in the Malayalam script, while the Paniya in Tamil Nadu use the Tamil script.

== Culture ==
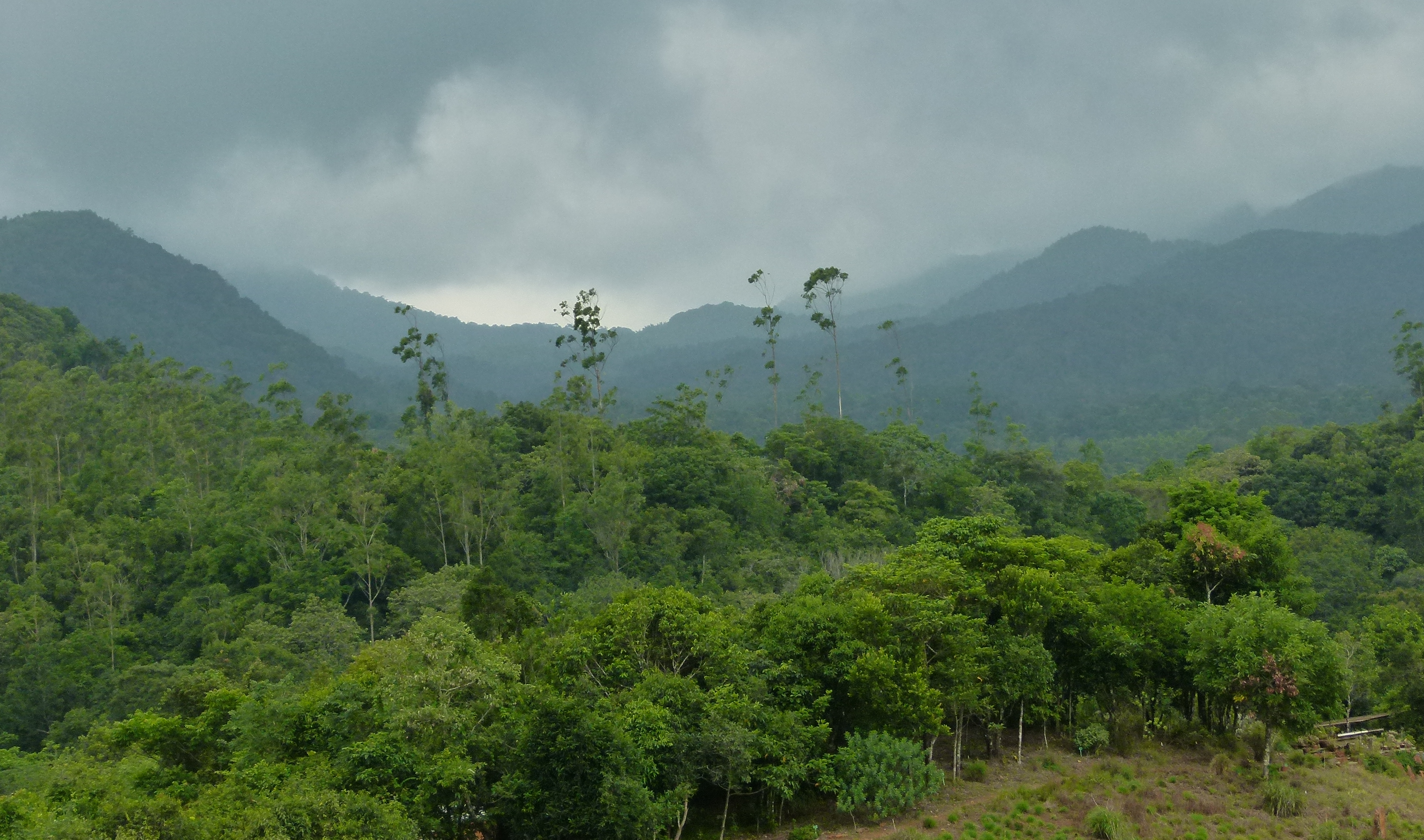
Paniya primarily inhabit Kerala, and the Wayanad, Kozhikode, Kannur and Malappuram districts.

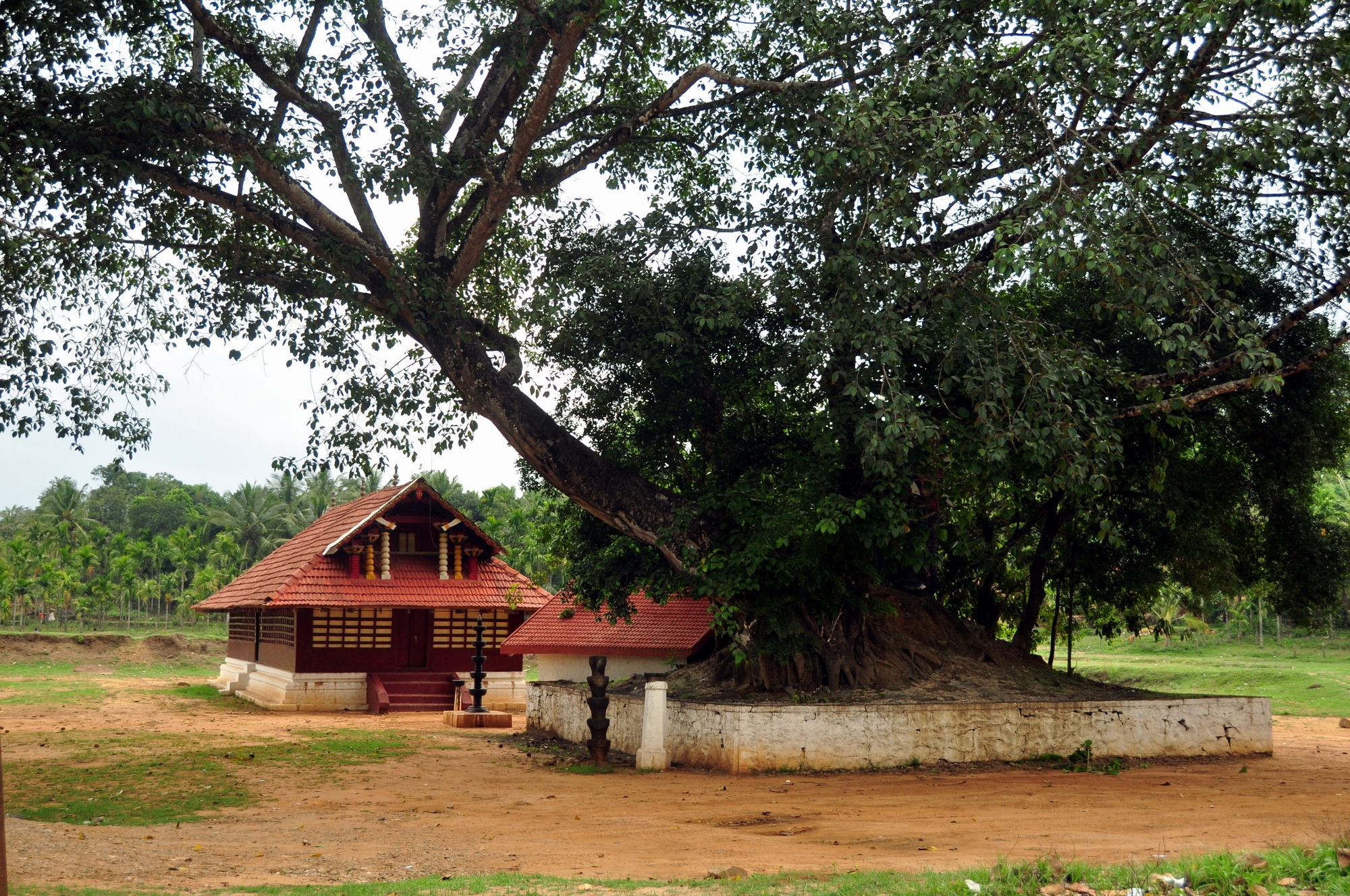
Valliyoorkkavu temple with banyan tree considered sacred by Paniya tribe.

Paniyas typically live in villages (padis) consisting of a few huts (pire or chala) with courtyards. Each hut settlement contains 5 to 15 families.

For attire, Paniya men wear a lengthy cloth wrapped around the waist, which is known as a mundu. A smaller mundu is also slung over the shoulders to cover the body. Paniya women or panichi don a long cloth, with a smaller one above the breast area and around the armpits. In addition, they wear a red or black aratti scarf around the waist. Land grabbers and poachers exploit them by encouraging drinking habit, sexual infidelity and other vices. PEEP Wayanad also organises various events to spread awareness on social menaces like alcoholism and chewing tobacco. Street plays in the local language has been staged at several forest settlements.

The Paniyas bury their dead in formal funeral rites. Typically, the place of burial is close to the padi. The interment is accompanied by a seven-day mourning period by family members.

== Religion ==
The modern Paniya practice a variety of faiths. Among these are Hinduism with local traditional beliefs, and minority follow Christianity. Their chief deities are Kuttichathan, Kattu-bhagavathi or Kaali of the forest, Mariyamma and Ayyappan are the chief God and Goddess. Valliyoorkkavu (temple) is where their prominent festivals take place which can be fall in the months of February, March and April. The worship of banyan tree is very significant in their unseen world, they are considered sacred.

== See also ==
- Irulas
- Soliga tribe
