= Ambalappad =

Village in Kerala

Ambalappad is a small village in Kozhikode district, located in Chelannur panchayath.

== Location ==
Ambalappad village connects other parts of India through Koyilandy town. The nearest airports are at Kannur and Kozhikode. The nearest railway station is at Koyilandy. National highway no. 66 passes through Koyilandy and the northern stretch connects to Mangalore, Goa and Mumbai. The southern stretch connects to Cochin and Trivandrum. The eastern National Highway 54 going through Kuttiady connects to Mananthavady, Mysore and Bangalore.
