= Thirunelli Temple =

Temple in India

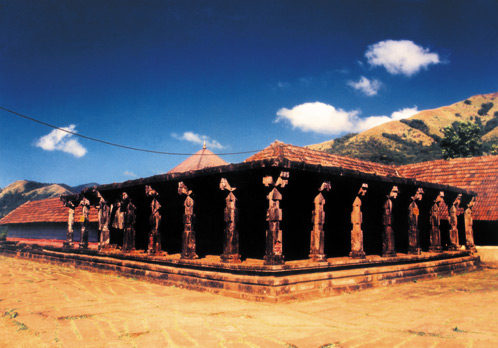

- Thirunelli Mahavishnu Temple, Wayanad, Kerala

Religion
- Affiliation: Hinduism
- District: Wayanad
- Deity: Lord Maha Vishnu

Location
- Location: Brahmagiri
- State: Kerala
- Country: India
- Interactive map of Thirunelli Temple
- Coordinates: 11°54′42″N 75°59′45″E

Specifications
- Temple: One
- Elevation: 890.02 m (2,920 ft)

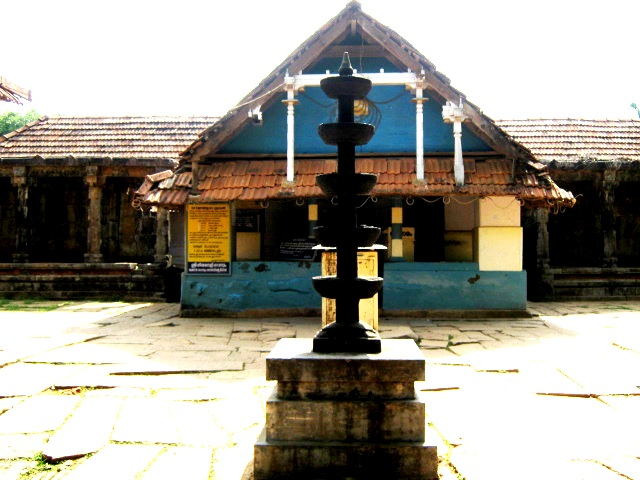
Thirunelli Temple front view

Thirunelli Temple (also spelled Tirunelli) is an ancient temple dedicated to Maha Vishnu on the side of Brahmagiri hill in Kerala, India, near the border with Karnataka state. The temple is classified one among the 108 Abhimana Kshethram of Vaishnavate tradition. The temple is at an altitude of about 900m in north Wayanad in a valley surrounded by mountains and forests. It is 32 km away from Manathavady.

The temple lies at an altitude of 3000 feet

== History ==
=== In Puranas and folklore ===
The name Thirunelli derives from the nelli, the Tamil/Malayalam word for Indian gooseberry of the Amla tree. The Matsya Purana, Skanda Purana, Narasimha Purana and Padma Purana, said the Vishnu temple was built by Brahma, in the Sahya valley and in these texts, it is referred to as "Sahyamalaka Kshetra." According to tradition, Brahma was traveling round the Universe on his hamsa, when he became attracted by the beauty of the area now known as Brahmagiri Hill. Descending on that spot, Brahma noticed an idol, set in an Amla tree. Brahma recognized the idol as Vishnu himself and the place as Vaikuntha (Vishnuloka) itself.

== See also ==
- Appapara
- Thirunelly
- Palvelicham
- Valliyoorkkavu
