= Makkada =

Makkada Kakkodi, Koodathumpoyil, Chelappram, Badiroor, Kottoopadam, Ottathengu, Cherukulam
- village
- Location in Kerala, India Makkada (India)
- Coordinates: 11°19′56″N 75°47′18″E
- Country: India
- State: Kerala
- District: Kozhikode

Government
  - Type: Panchayati Raj
  - Body: Local self-government

Languages
  - Official: Malayalam, English
- Time zone: UTC+5:30 (IST)
- Postal code: 673611
- Vehicle registration: KL- 11
- Coastline: 7.8 kilometres (4.8 mi)
- Climate: Tropical monsoon (Köppen)
- Avg. summer temperature: 35 °C (95 °F)
- Avg. winter temperature: 20 °C (68 °F)

Makkada is a village in Kakkodi panchayath in Calicut district of Kerala state. The postal pin code is 673611.

Geographically Makkada covers about half the size of the kakkodi Panchayath and situates north of the Panchayath. Unlike many other villages in Kerala there isn't a town called Makkada in this village, but there are a couple of institutions which carry the name, the post office and an LP school.
