= Palvelicham =

- village
- Interactive map of Palvelicham
- Coordinates: 11.82123°N 76.08852°E
- Country: India
- State: Kerala
- District: Wayanad

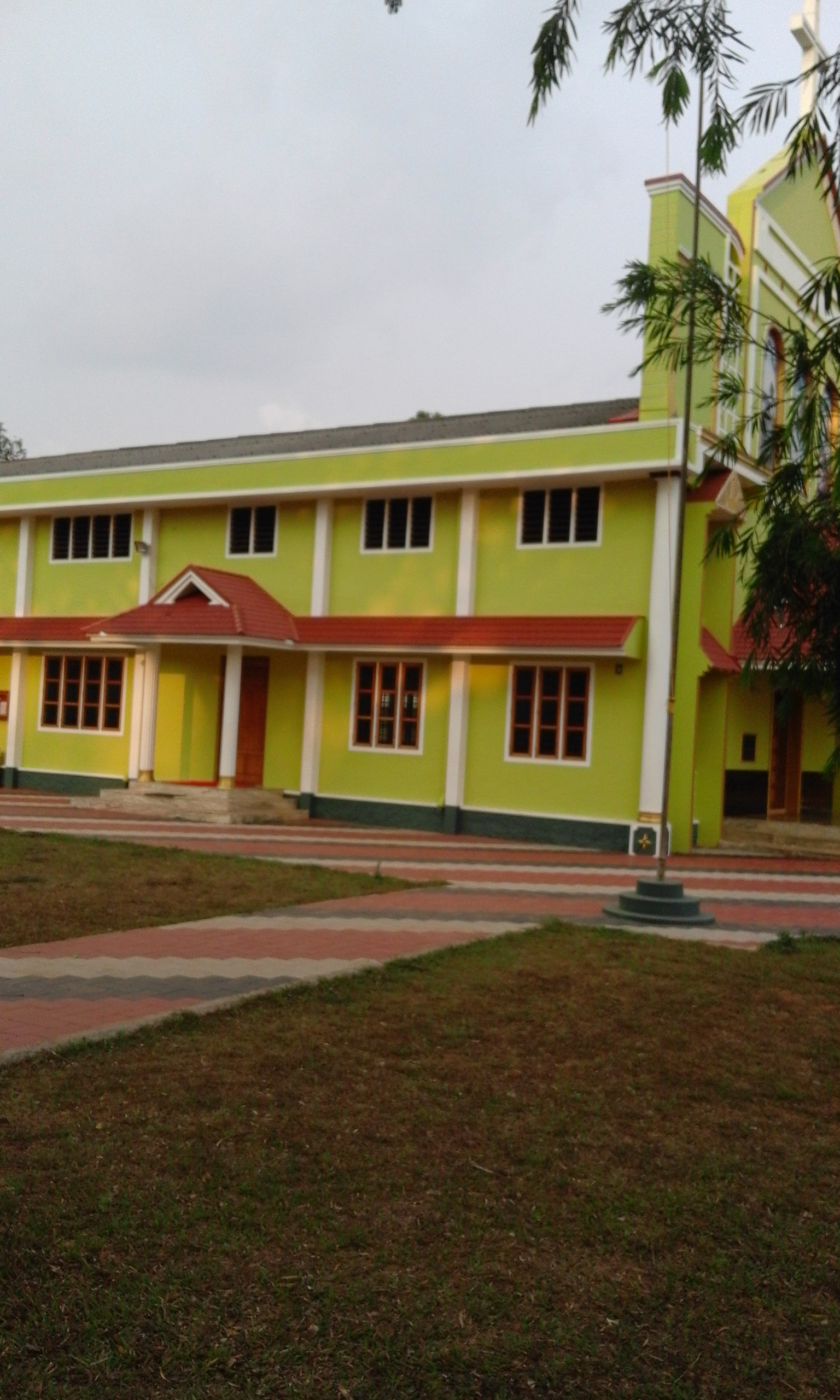
Alphonsa Church, Palvelicham

Palvelicham is a small village near Kattikkulam town in Mananthavady area of Wayanad district, Kerala, India.

== Location ==
Palvelicham village is located inside the teak forest of Wayanad.

== Attractions ==
The main attraction is the immense Alphonsa Church with two entrances. Kuruva islands are also close by.

== The U-Turn ==
The road to Palvelicham goes around the Alphonsa Church and comes back to the back side of the church. The small town of Palvelicham is also on the back side of the church.

== Transportation ==
Palvelicham can be accessed from Kattikkulam near Mananthavady. The Periya ghat road connects Mananthavady to Kannur and Thalassery. The Thamarassery mountain road connects Calicut with Kalpetta. The Kuttiady mountain road connects Vatakara with Kalpetta and Mananthavady. The Palchuram mountain road connects Kannur and Iritty with Mananthavady. The road from Nilambur to Ooty is also connected to Wayanad through the village of Meppadi.

The nearest railway station is at Mysore and the nearest airports are Kozhikode International Airport-120 km, Bengaluru International Airport-290 km, and Kannur International Airport, 58 km.

== Image gallery ==
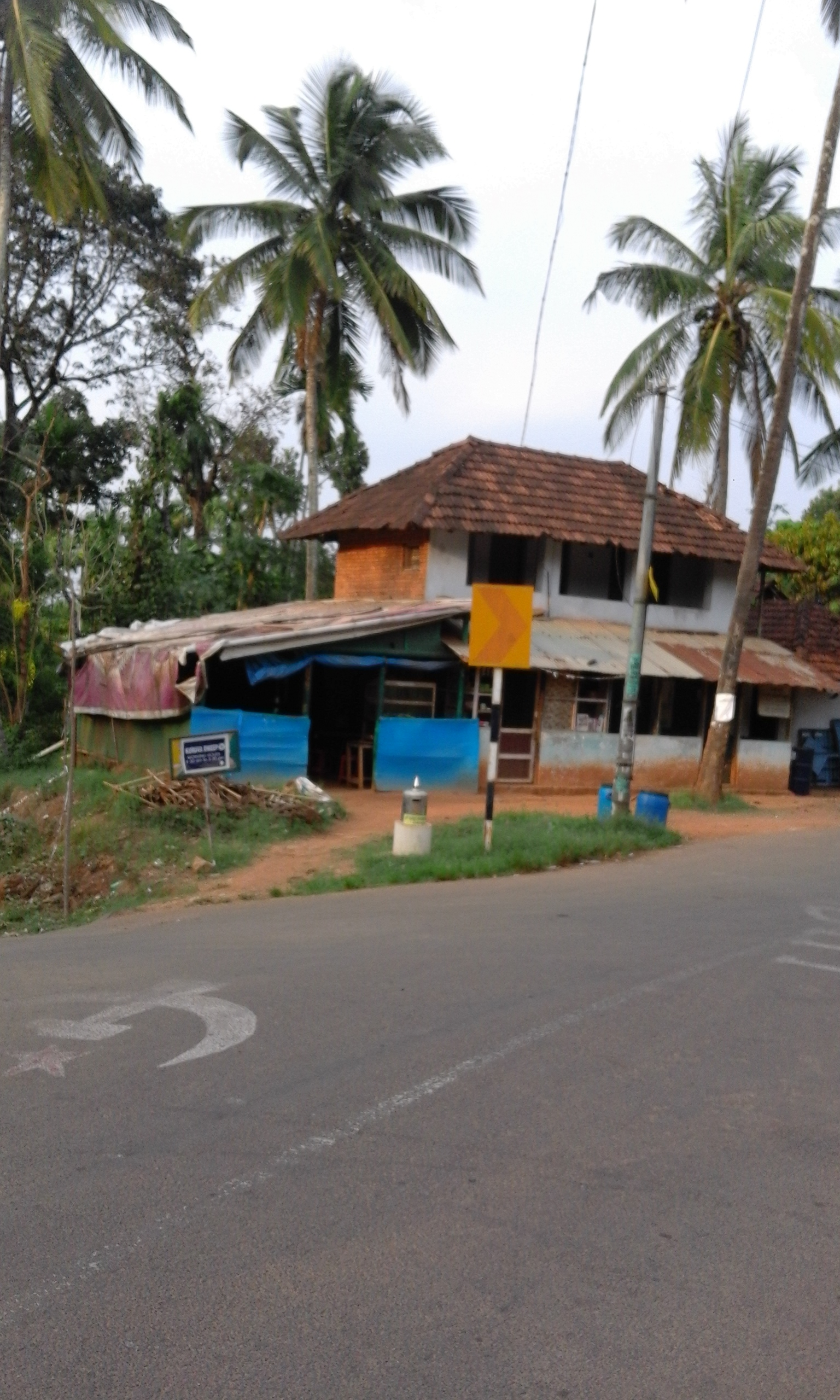
Palvelicham Angadi

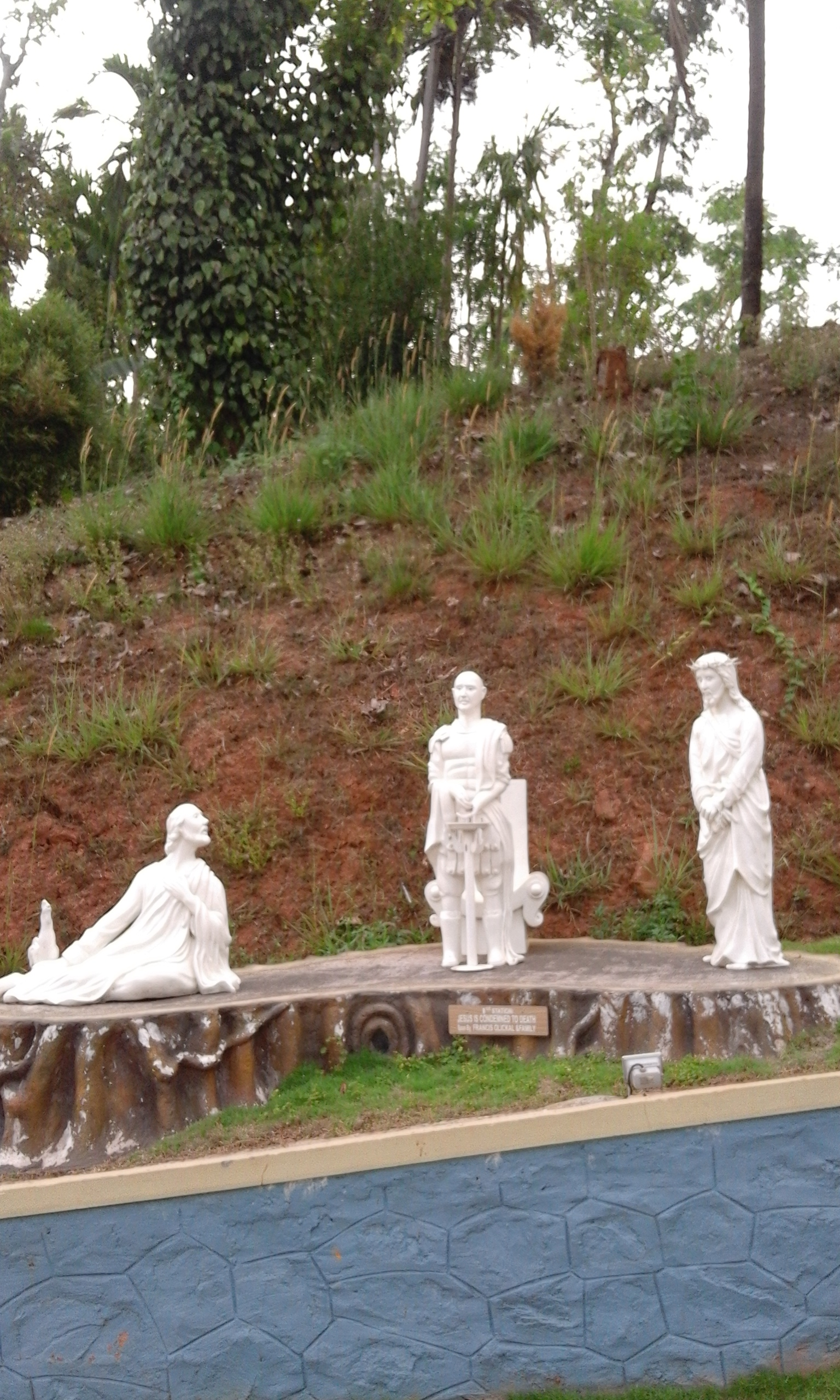
Alphonsa church entrance
