= Brahmagiri (Karnataka) =

Mountain range in India

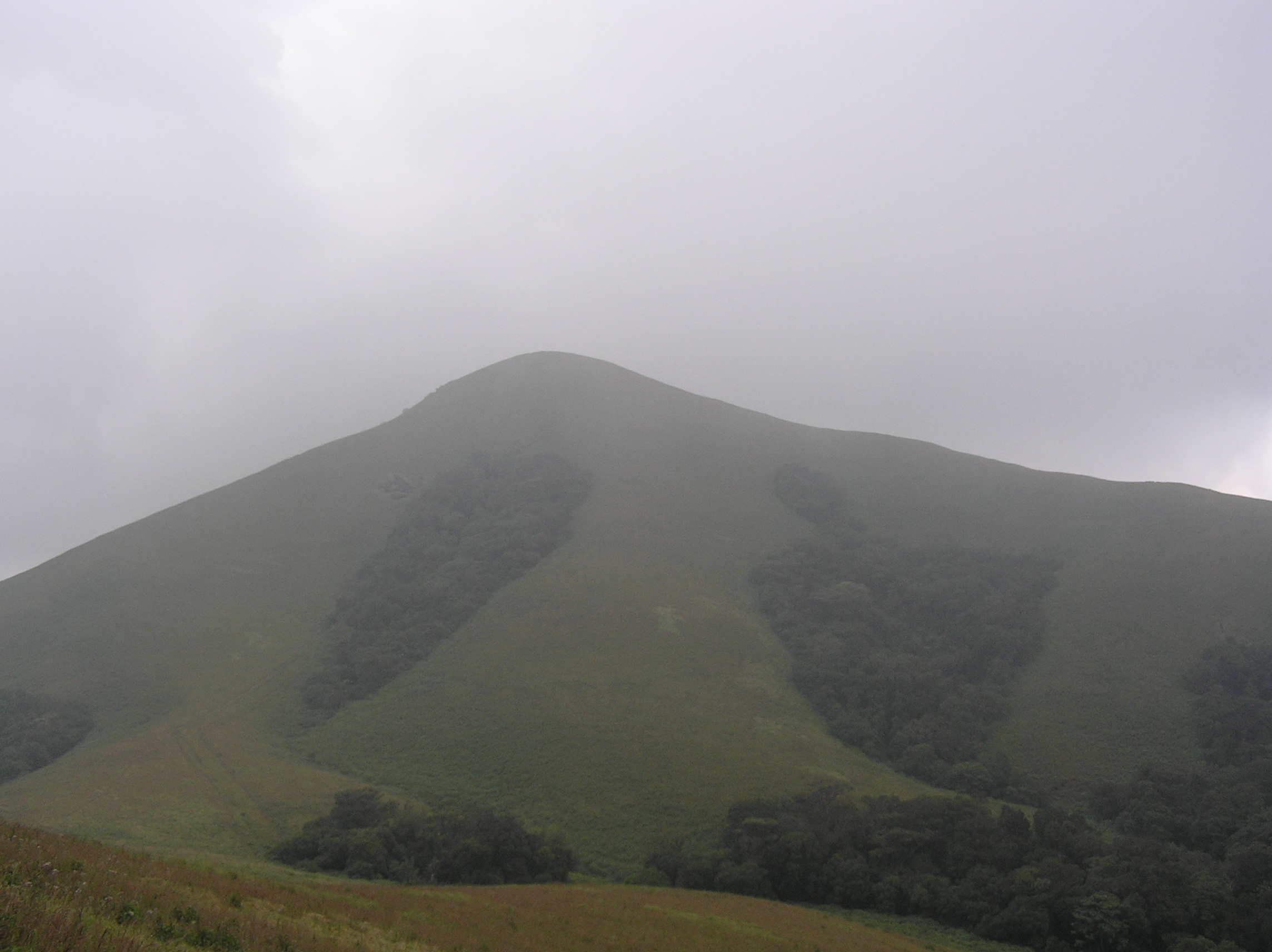
- Brahmagiri. Mountain peak covered with fog.

Highest point
- Elevation: 1,608 m (5,276 ft)
- Coordinates: 11°57′N 75°57′E

Geography
- Location within India Location within Karnataka Location within Kerala
- Location: Border of Mananthavady Taluk, Wayanad District, Kerala and Virajpet Taluk, Kodagu district, Karnataka, India
- Parent range: Western Ghats

Climbing
- Easiest route: Hike

Brahmagiri is a mountain range in the Western Ghats of south India. It is situated on the border between Kodagu district in Karnataka state in the north and Wayanad district of Kerala state on the south. Brahmagiri Hill, at 1608 m height, near Tirunelli is a scenic tourist attraction. The top of Brahmagiri Hill is well forested and has much wildlife.

== Tourist attractions ==
Thirunelli Temple, dedicated to Lord Vishnu, lies on the Kerala side of Brahmagiri. The temple was constructed in an ancient style and includes 30 granite pillars. According to legend, the temple was constructed by Lord Brahma himself.

Pakshipathalam at an altitude of 1740 m is another attraction on the Kerala side. Pakshipathalam has a cave that is said to have been used by rishis in ancient times. On the Karnataka side it is also known by the name of Munikal cave.

Iruppu (or Irpu or Lakshmana Tirtha) Falls of the Lakshmana Tirtha River lies on the Karnataka side of Brahmagiri. According to legend, when Rama and Lakshmana were searching for Sita, they became thirsty. Lakshmana shot an arrow into the Brahmagiri from which the river sprang. Rama is said to have dedicated a Shiva Kshethra known as Rajeshwara Temple on the banks of river Lakshmana Tirtha. The Lakshmana Tirtha river eventually flows into the Kaveri River. One Jain Temple is also present here built by Kadamba dynasty.

== Transportation ==
Brahmagiri can be reached by a trek from Mananthavady (29 km east) or from Kutta. From Karnataka side, trek to Brahmagiri from Irupu Falls is 9 km and to Munikal Caves (Pakshipathalam) is 7 km. Trekkers need to seek the permission of Range Forest Officer at Srimangala. Brahmagiri is about 11 km from Tirunelli.

The Periya ghat road connects Mananthavady to Kannur and Thalassery. The Thamarassery mountain road connects Calicut with Kalpetta. The Kuttiady mountain road connects Vatakara with Kalpetta and Mananthavady. The Palchuram mountain road connects Kannur and Iritty with Mananthavady. The road from Nilambur to Ooty is also connected to Wayanad through the village of Meppadi.

The nearest railway station is at Mysore and Thalassery and the nearest airports are Kozhikode International Airport-120 km, Bengaluru International Airport-290 km, Mangalore International Airport- 235 km and Kannur International Airport- 58 km.

== See also ==
- Pakshi Pathalam is a trekking site some seven kilometres from Thirunelli temple near Kattikkkulam town. There is an ancient cave on the hillock with plenty of birds.
- Mullayana Giri
- Baba Budan giri
- Kodachadri
- Pushpagiri

== Gallery ==
Brahmagiri

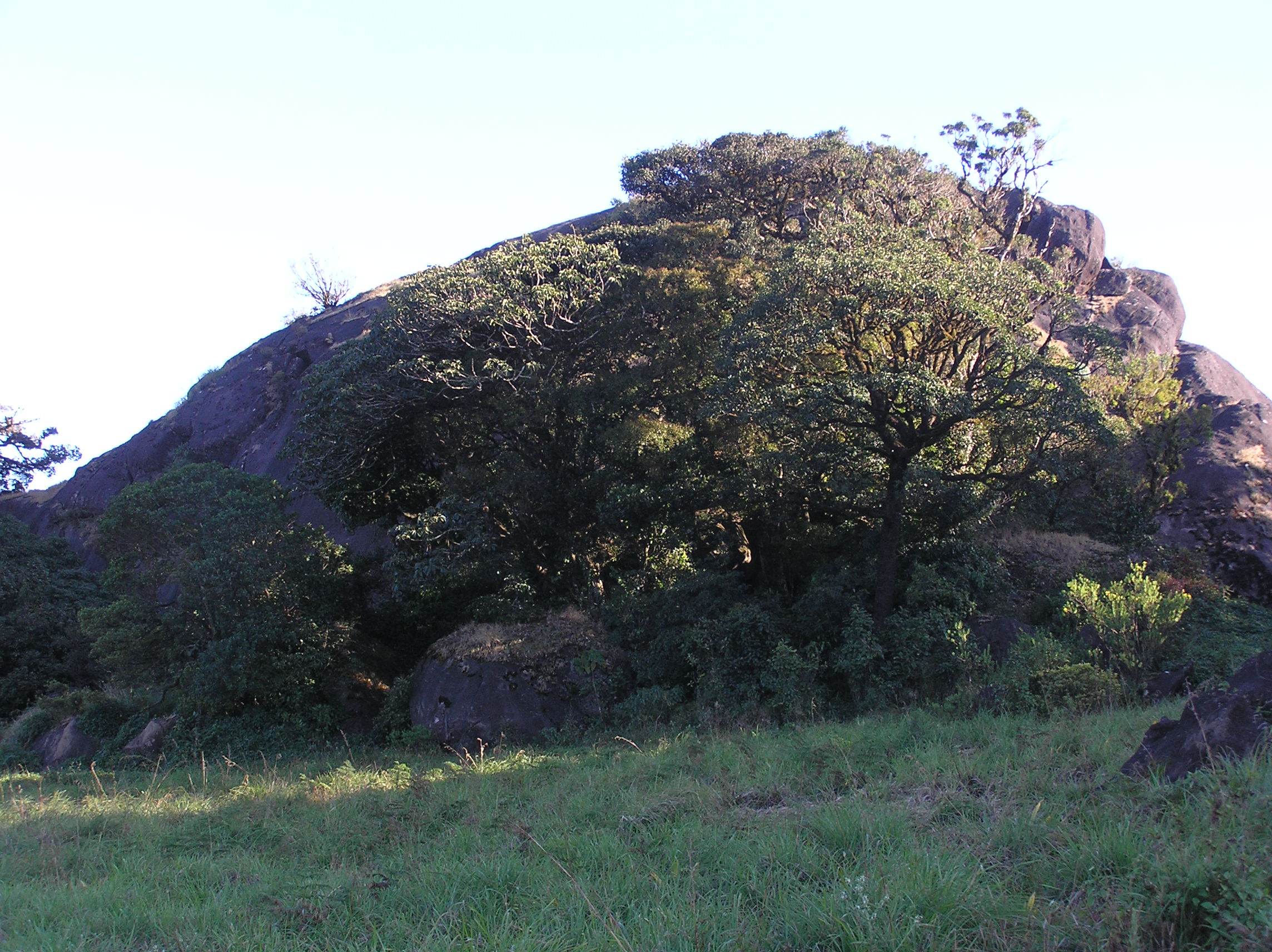
'Munikal Caves'

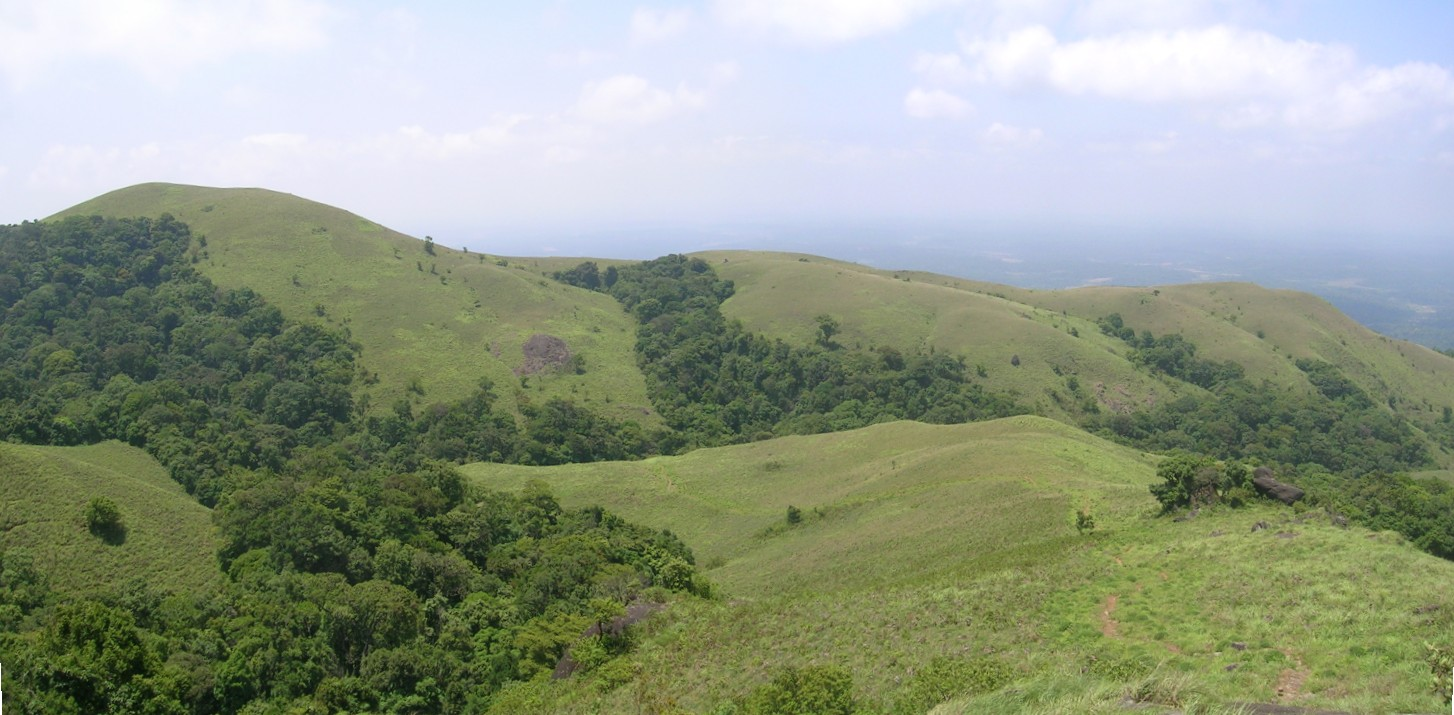
Shola forests
