= Chelannur =

- Village
- Location in Kerala, India
- Coordinates: 11°20′30″N 75°48′30″E
- Country: India
- State: Kerala
- District: Kozhikode

Government
  - Type: Democratic

Population (2011)
  - Total: 40,697

Languages
  - Official: Malayalam, English
- Time zone: UTC+5:30 (IST)
- PIN: 673616
- Vehicle registration: KL-76

Chelannur is a village in Kozhikode district in the state of Kerala, India.

== Demographics ==
As of 2011 India census, Chelannur has a population of 40,697 with 19,574 males and 21,123 females.

== Landmarks ==
- Ette Randu: 8/2 also known as the 8.2 mile road is the hub of Chelannur
- Digital Seva Common Service Center
- Ollopara, a scebuc place in Chelannur were a lot of movies have been shot
- Pulikkool paradevatha temple(famous)
- Shri Krishna Temple
- Parappurath Shri Nagakali Temple
- Maruthad Rahma Juma Masjidh
- Sree Kizhakkayil Baghavathy Temple
- Subramanya Swamy Temple
- Viraloor Sree Narashimhamoorty Temple Kannankara
- Chelannur Mahasiva temple
- Koottakkil Farm
- koottakkil water tank
- PHC Iruvallur Ambalappad
- Kannippoyil Paikattukotta Sree Paradevatha temple
- Valottil Bhagavathi temple

== Education ==
According to census 2011, more than 98% of students under 16 are going to school. There are currently two higher secondary schools in Chelannur, namely AKKR Girls Higher Secondary School and Sree Narayana Guru College.

- SNG College Chelannur, founded in 1968.

== Suburbs and Villages ==
- Kakkoor, Ambalathukulangara and Kumaraswamy Junction
- Kakkodimukkum Kakkodi, Muttoli and Thanneer Panthal
- Vengeri, Thadambattu Thazham and karaparamba
- Ambalappad
