= Thirunelly =

- Village
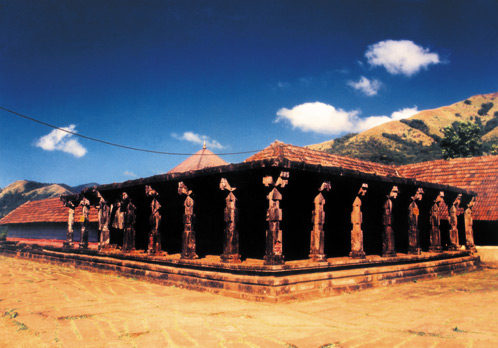
- Thirunelli Temple

- Location in Kerala, India Thirunelly (India)
- Coordinates: 11.89926°N 76.02379°E
- Country: India
- State: Kerala
- District: Wayanad

Population (2011)
  - Total: 12,878

Languages
  - Official: Malayalam, English
- Time zone: UTC+5:30 (IST)
- PIN: 670646
- ISO 3166 code: IN-KL
- Vehicle registration: KL-72

Thirunelly is a village in Wayanad district in the state of Kerala, India.

Thirunelli Temple is in the village.

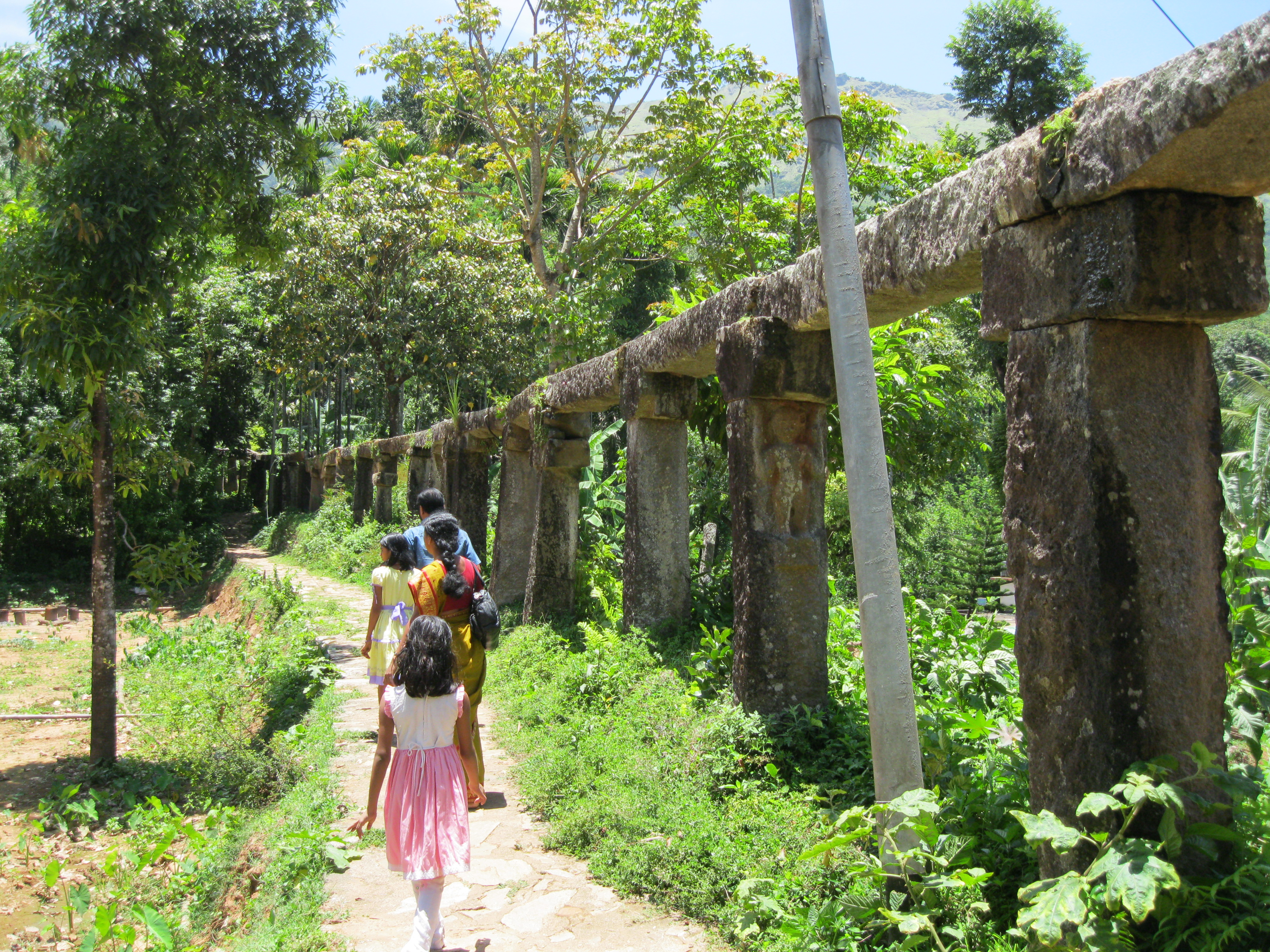
Stone Pipeline at Thirunelly

== Demographics ==
As of 2011 India census, Thirunelly had a population of 12878 with 6306 males and 6572 females.Most of the residents are Scheduled Tribes and Thiyyas.

== See also ==
- Kattikkulam
- Mananthavady
- Valliyoorkkavu
- Pakshi Pathalam is a trekking site some seven kilometers from Thirunelli temple near Kattikkkulam. There is an ancient cave on the hillock with plenty of birds.
