= Kattikkulam =

Kattikkulam (Kartikulam)
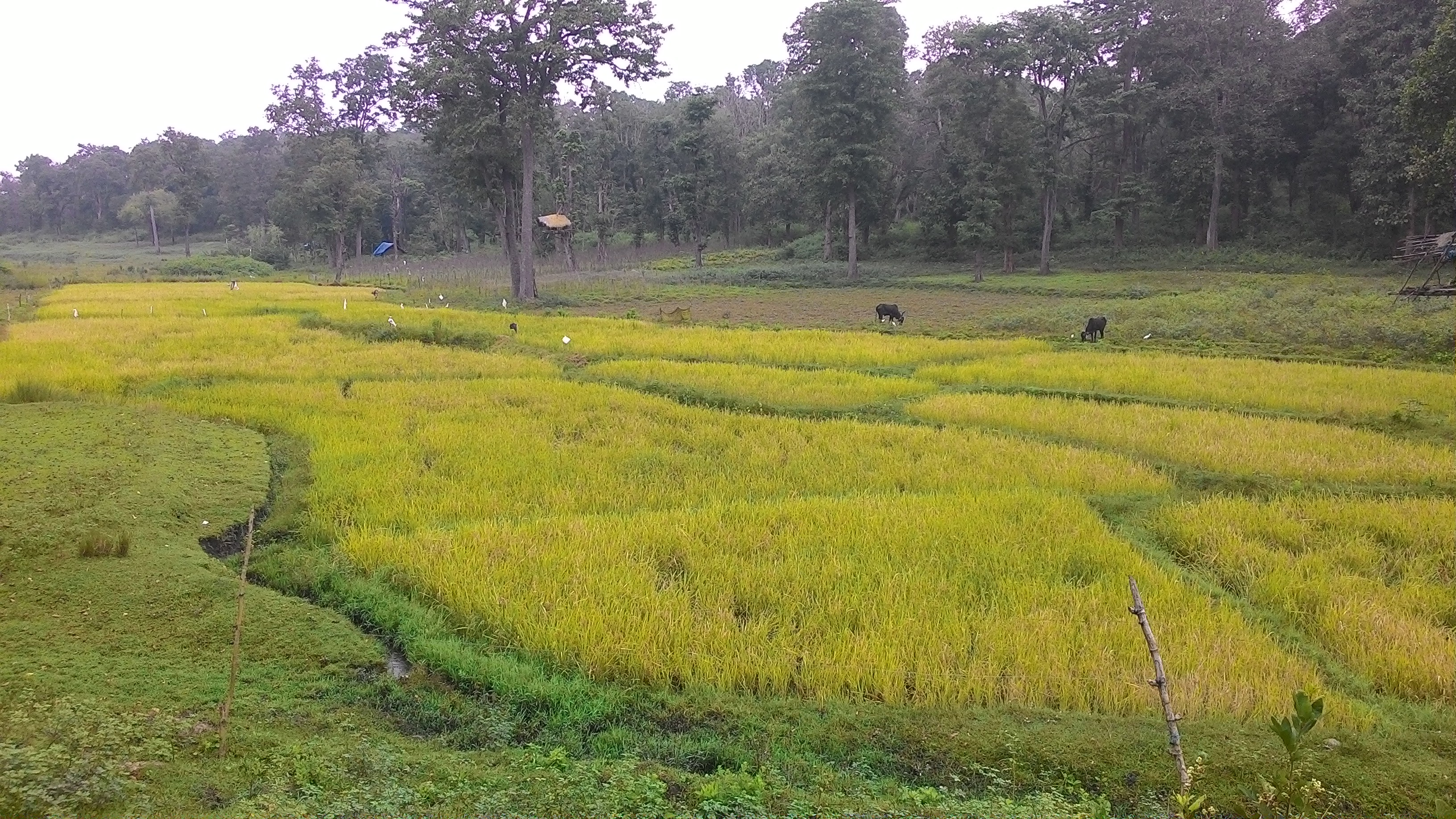
- Paddy Fields on the sides of Kattikkulam Mysore road.
- Interactive map of Kattikkulam
- Coordinates: 11.84683°N 76.06313°E
- Country: India
- State: Kerala
- District: Wayanad
- Time zone: UTC+5:25 (IST)
- PIN: 670646

Kattikkulam (Kartikulam) is a small town near Mananthavady in Wayanad district, Kerala, India. The office of the Thirunelly Gramapanchayath is located at Kartikulam.

This small town serves as the connection point for most of the tourists and pilgrims from Kerala and Karnataka who come to visit places like Thirunelli Temple, Bavali Maqam, Padamala church, Kuruvadweep, Tholpetty, Panavalli, Coorg, Mysore etc.

It is connected by road with Mananthavady, Mysore and with the district of Coorg. Buses plying from Kozhikode (Calicut) and Kannur to Mysore and vice versa during the night pass through the town because the NH 766 connecting Kozhikode (Calicut) and Mysore through Sulthan Bathery closes at 9 pm.

It is being developed as a more or less satellite town of Mananthavady. Many new infrastructure facilities are being added to this town every year.

There are a few good restaurants and hotels available in this town. Many homestays, lodges and resorts are also available in and around this area.

Two petrol bunks are functioning inside the town.

Three ATM counters run by the Kerala State Co-operative Bank, Kerala Gramin Bank and ESAF bank also functions here.

== Important Organizations ==
- Kattikkulam Govt. Higher Secondary School
- Thirunelly Panchayath Office
- Thirunelly Panchayath Bus Stand
- RTO Checkpost, Kartikulam
- Thirunelly Police Aid Post, Kartikulam
- Post Office Kartikulam (PIN-670646)
- Thirunelly Panchayath Community Hall
- Primary Health Center, Begur, Kartikulam
- Kerala Gramin Bank & ATM
- Kerala State Co-operative Bank & ATM
- Thirunelly Service Co-operative Bank
- Holiday Hill Hotel
- Govt. Homoeo Dispensary
- Thrissilery Village Office
- Kartikulam veterinary hospital
- Kartikulam agricultural office
- Water treatment plant KWA
- ESAF bank & ATM
- KSEB Kartikulam Section Office

== Places to visit ==
Kuruvadweep is a 950 acre protected river delta on the Kabini River in the Wayanad district. It is home for a variety of species of birds and animals. It is about 6 km from Kattikulam town. Buses are available regularly.

Thirunelly Temple is an ancient temple and pilgrimage which is about 22 km from Kartikulam. Buses ply from Mananthavady on regular intervals.

Pakshi Pathalam is a trekking site some seven kilometers from Thirunelli temple. There is an ancient cave on the hillock with plenty of birds.

Tholpetty Wildlife Sanctuary is a very famous trekking spot which is located at a distance of 16 km from Kartikulam. Buses are available regularly.

Irupp Falls is located in the Kodagu district of Karnataka bordering the Wayanad district of Kerala. It is located at a distance of 26 km from Kartikulam.

== Transportation ==
Kattikkulam can be accessed from Mananthavady, Mysore and Coorg.

Road distance from nearest towns:

Mananthavady -10 km

Kalpetta-33 km

Sulthan Bathery-39 km

Kannur- 96 km

Kozhikode-103 km

Mysore -100 km

Madikeri-100 km

Gudalur- 88 km

Ooty-132 km

The shortest route which connects Mananthavady with Mysore passes through Kartikulam. This road passing through Bavali usually closes after 6 pm. But the road along Kartikulam-Kutta-Gonikoppal-Mysore is open 24 hours.

The nearest railway station is at Thalassery (80 km)

Kozhikode railway station is at a distance of 106 km

Mysore railway station is at distance of 102 km

Nearest airport which is in operation is the Kannur International Airport-73 km. The next nearest airport available is Calicut International Airport (128km).Mysore Airport at a distance of 103km.

== Location ==
Located on the north eastern side of Wayanad district along the road connecting Mananthavady and Mysore at a distance of 9 km from Mananthavady.

== See also ==
Thirunelli

Bavali

Mananthavady

Kutta
