= Valliyoorkkavu =

Hindu temple in Kerala, South India

Valliyoorkkavu Shree Bhagavathy Temple is an ancient Bhagavathy temple located near Mananthavady in the Wayanad district. The temple is for Goddess Bhadrakali (a form of supreme mother Adi Parashakthi) as its presiding deity. She is also worshipped in three forms namely: Bhagavathy, Vana Durga, and Jala Durga.

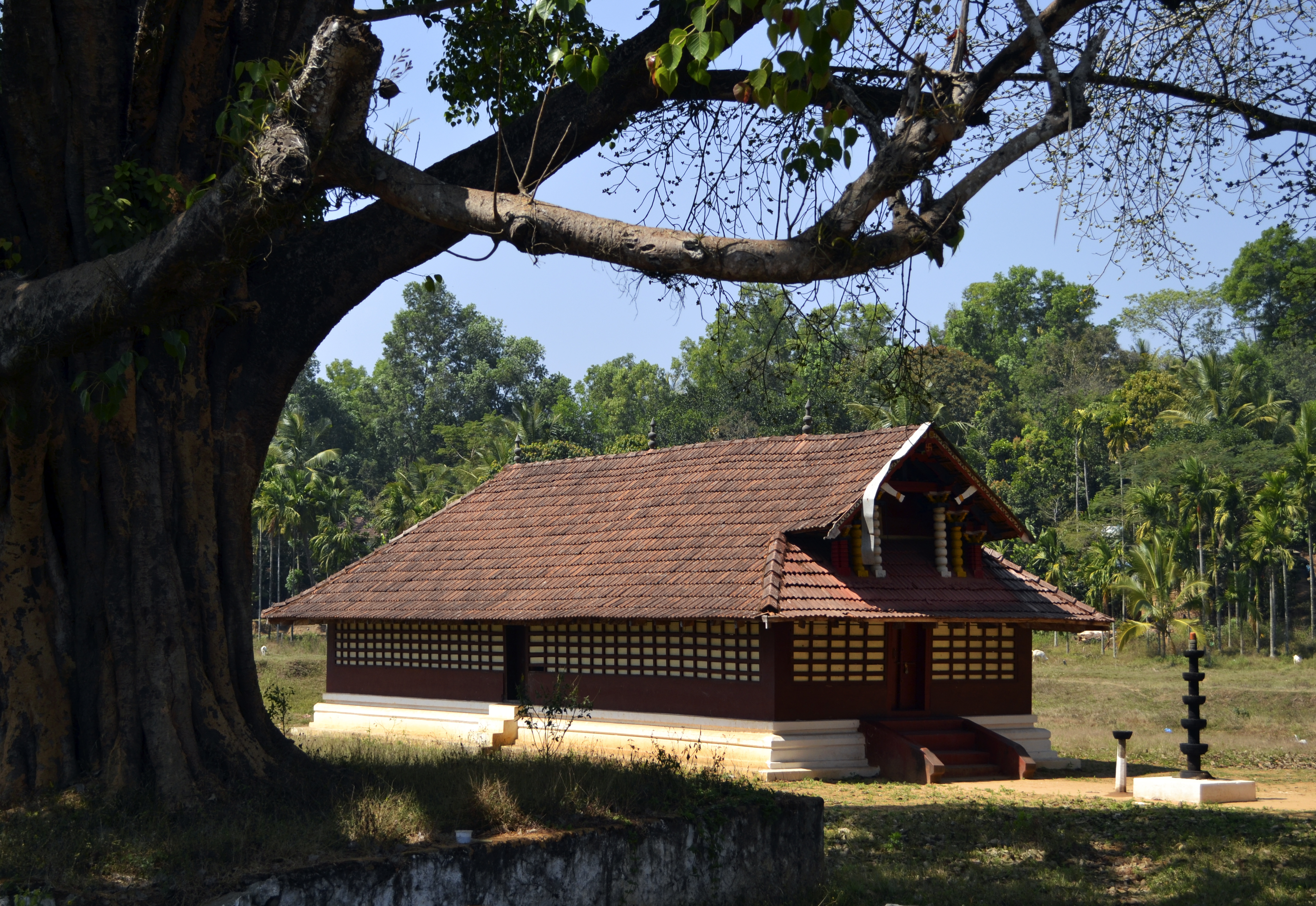
Valliyoorkkavu Temple

The idol of the temple is believed to be self-manifested and the annual festival falls in the month of March and lasts for 14 days. It is a major event with thousands of participants taking part in it.

== Rituals ==
The temple has many numerous rituals held during the festival include the oppana varavu, a procession from Cheramkode Bhagavathy temple at Kallody near Mananthavady and Adiyaras, a procession with tender coconut for abhishekam (ablution) marks the arattu of Valliyooramma. The festival concluded when the oppana varavu returns to Cheramkode Bhagavathy temple after the rudhirakkolam, a symbolic fight between Goddess and the demon king, Darika, in which the Bhagavathy wins.

The festival is important for the tribal people of Wayanad. The traditional ritual of Kalamezhuthu is performed during the nights of the festival. On the final day, an array of folk art forms are presented. The dances are performed by the local tribes with native percussion instruments, which is a major attraction.

== Transportation ==
Valliyoorkkavu can be accessed from Mananthavady or Kalpetta. The Periya ghat road connects Mananthavady to Kannur and Thalassery. The Thamarassery ghat road connects Calicut with Kalpetta. The Kuttiady ghat road connects Vatakara with Kalpetta and Mananthavady. The Palchuram mountain road connects Kannur and Iritty with Mananthavady. The road from Nilambur to Ooty also connects Wayanad through the village of Meppadi.

The nearest railway station is at Thalassery 83;km. The nearest airports are [Kannur International airport 58;km, Bengaluru International Airport-290 km

== Image gallery ==
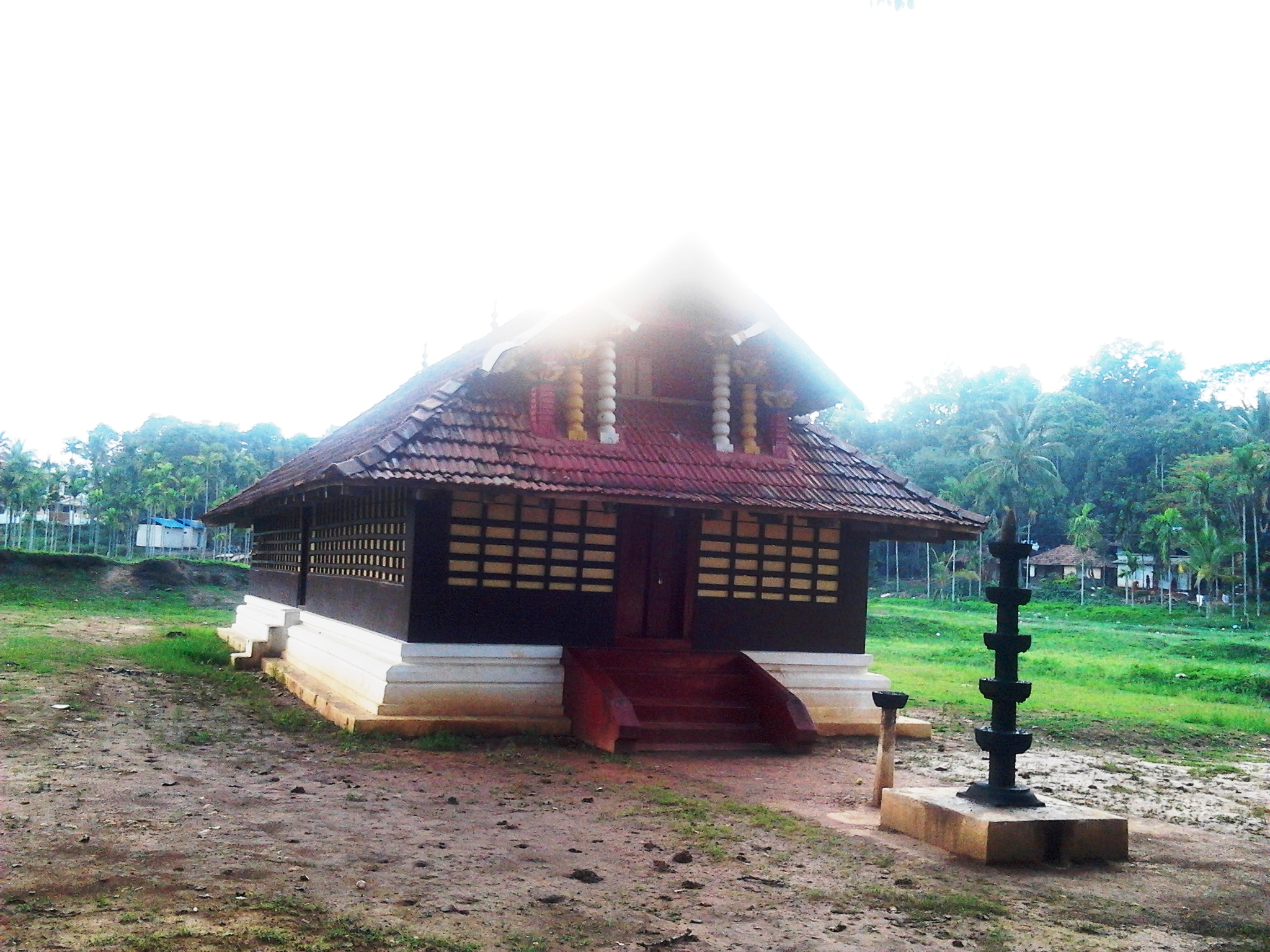
Vallyoorkkavu Temple

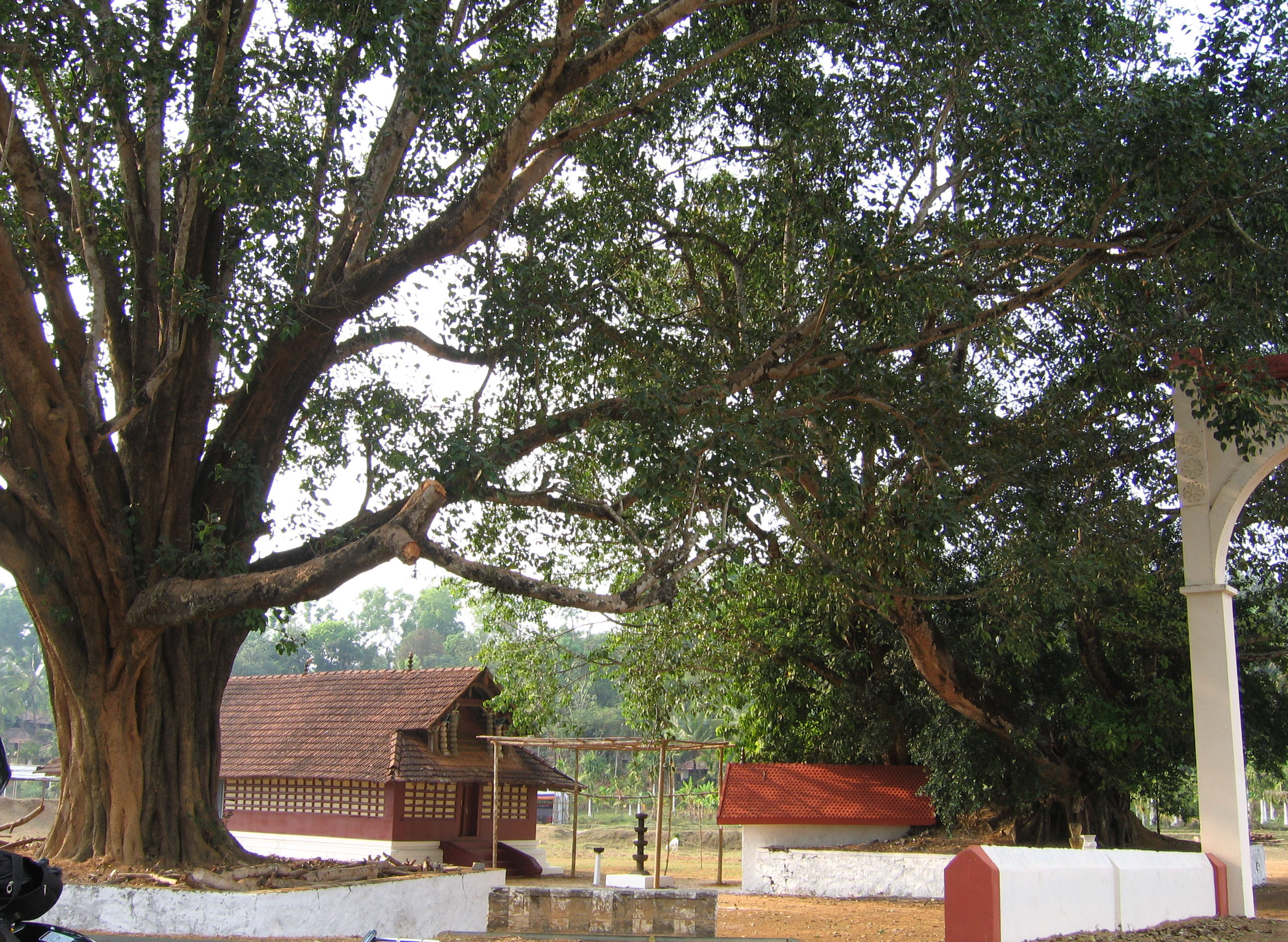
Temple in 2015

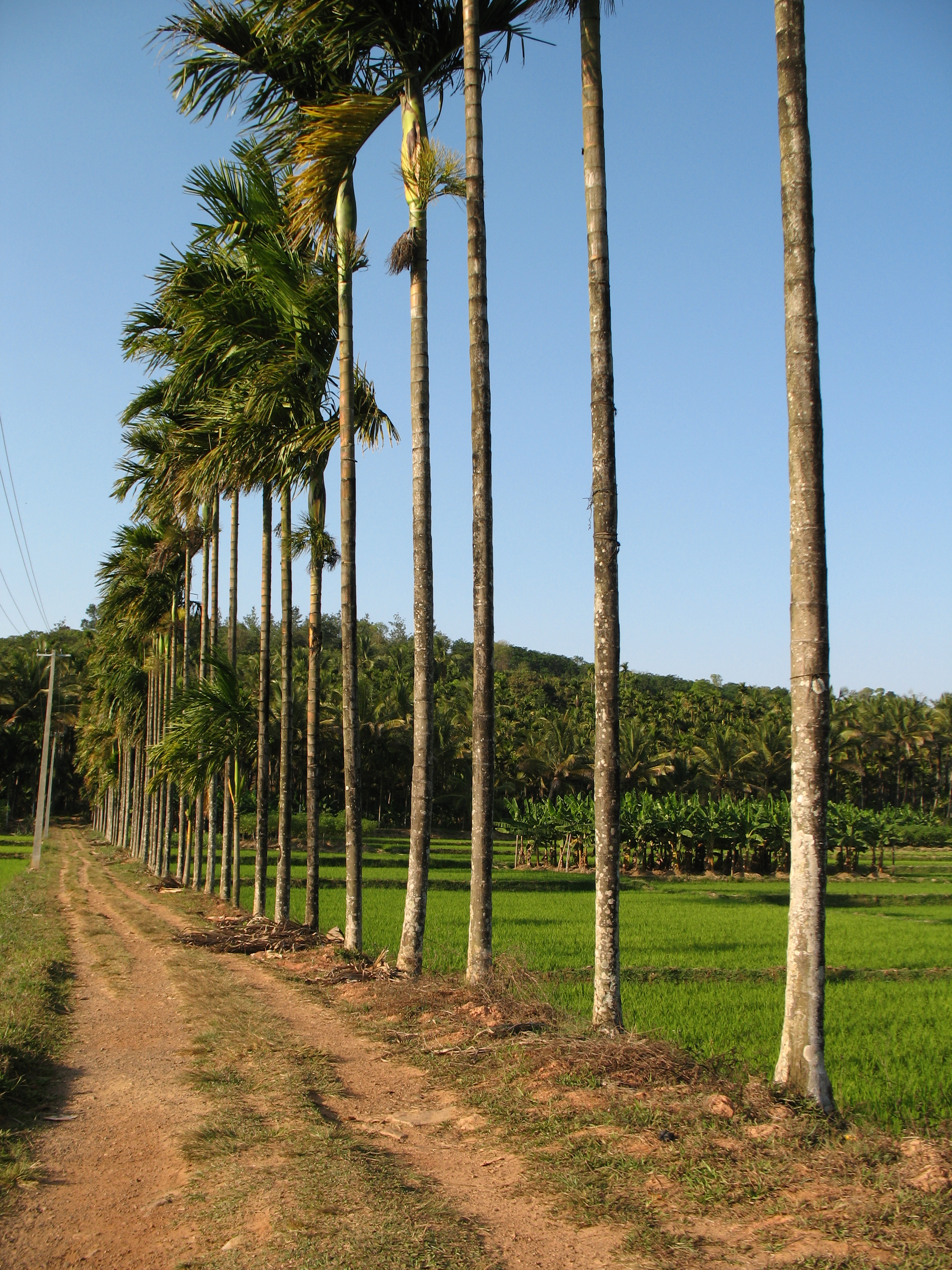
Koyileri Village

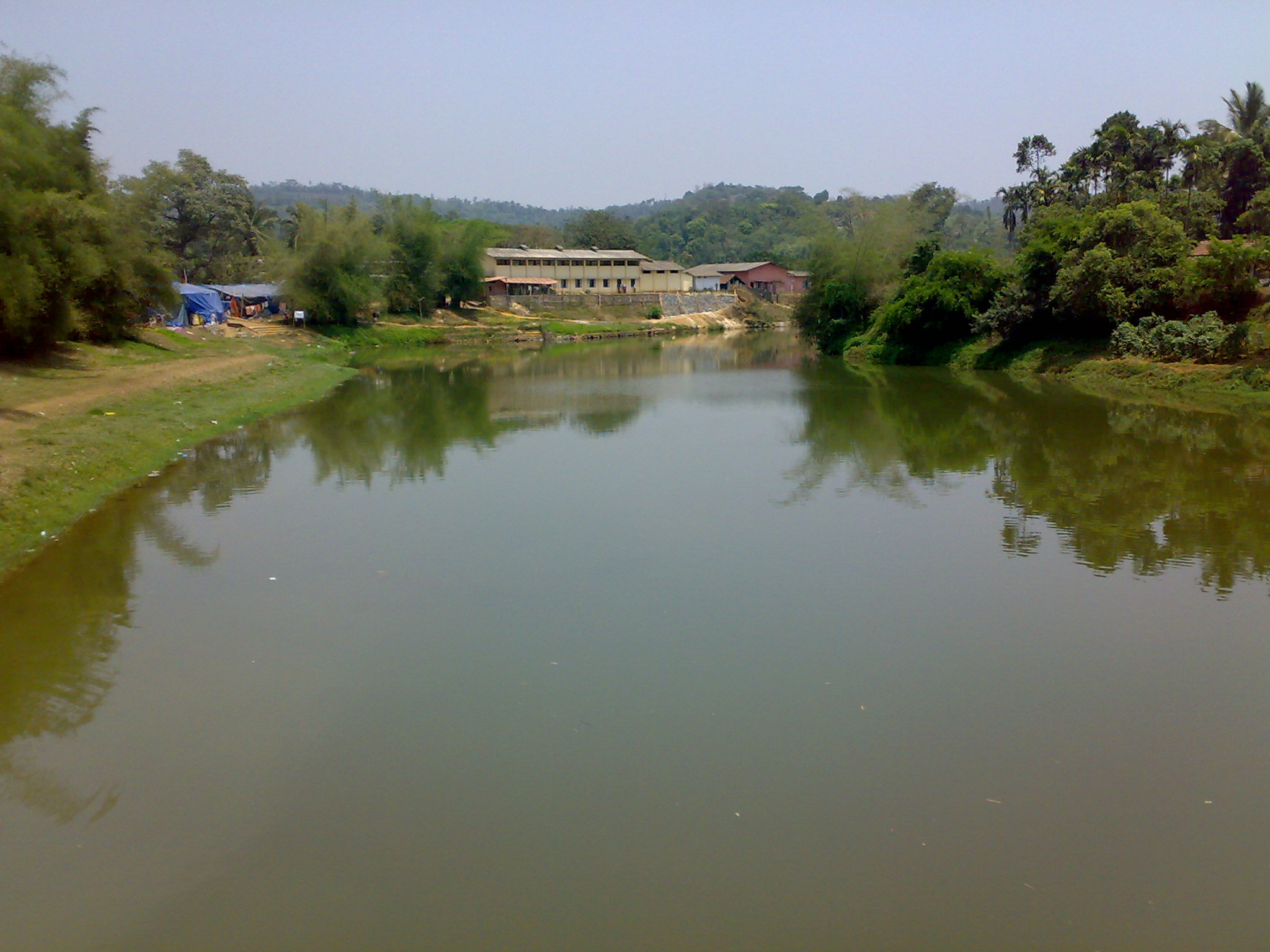
Kabini River

== See also ==
- Kattikkulam
- Thirunelly
- Mananthavady
