= Mananthavady =

Town in Kerala, India

- Municipality
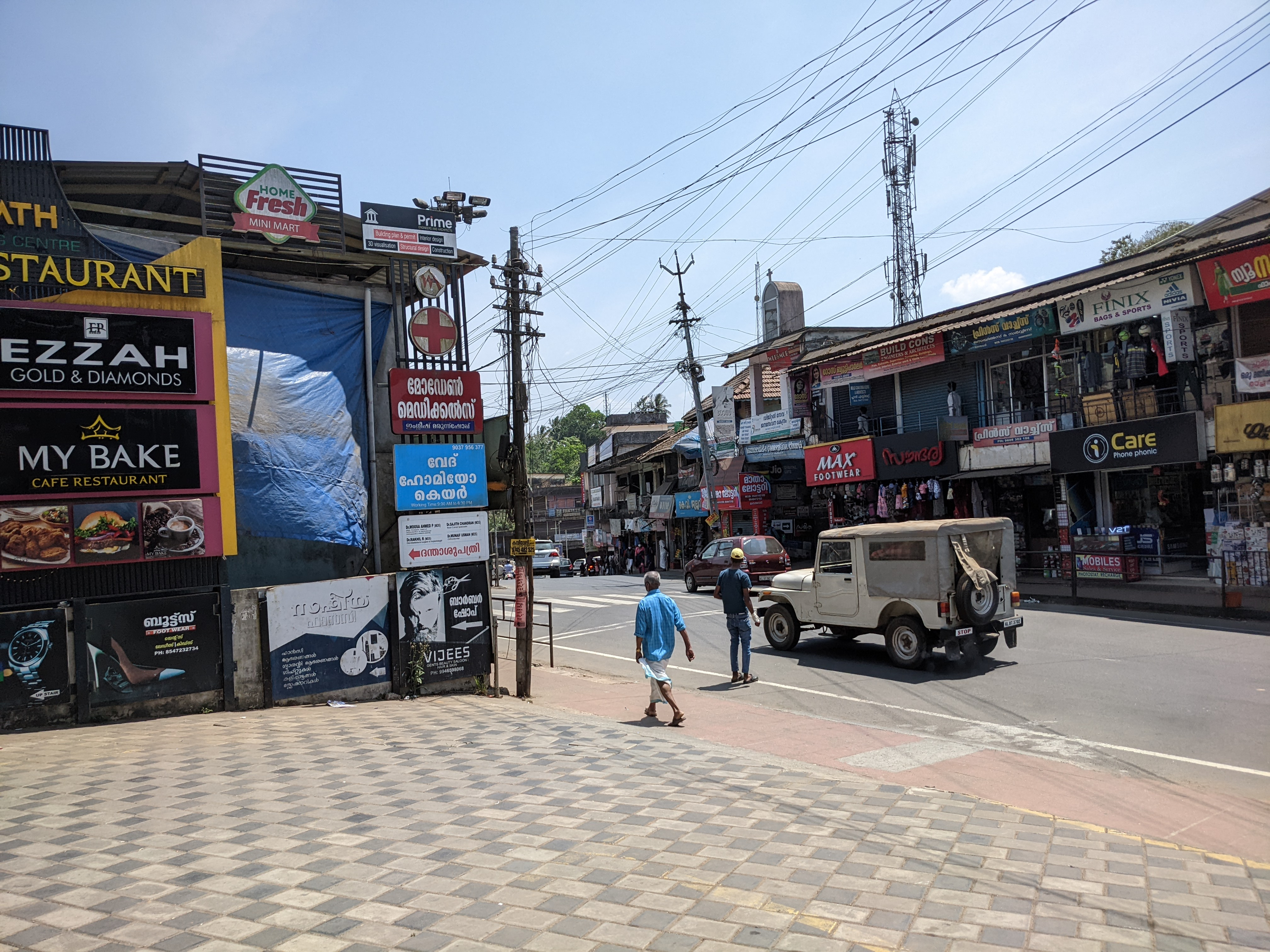
- Mysore Road

- Location in Kerala, India Mananthavady (India)
- Coordinates: 11°48′N 76°0′E
- Country: India
- State: Kerala
- District: Wayanad

Government
  - Body: Municipality
  - Municipal Chairperson: Jacob Sebastian(INC)
  - Member of the Legislative Assembly of Kerala (MLA): Usha Vijayan
  - Member of Parliament: Priyanka Gandhi (Indian National Congress)

Area
  - Total: 80.1 km^{2} (30.9 sq mi)
- Elevation: 760 m (2,490 ft)

Population (2011)
  - Total: 47,974
  - Density: 599/km^{2} (1,550/sq mi)

Languages
  - Official: Malayalam, English
- Time zone: UTC+5:30 (IST)
- PIN: 670645
- Telephone code: 04935
- ISO 3166 code: IN-KL
- Vehicle registration: KL-72
- Sex ratio: 1051♀/♂
- Literacy: 91.98%

Mananthavady (Malayalam: [maːnɐn̪d̪ɐʋaːɖi]) is a municipality, taluk and the sole revenue division in the Wayanad district of Kerala, India. The municipal boundaries are defined by Tirunelli Panchayat to the north, Kabini River to the east and south, and Thavinhal Panchayat to the west. Mananthavady is located 30 km (19 mi) north of the district headquarters Kalpetta, 93 km (58 mi) east of Kannur and 101 km (63 mi) northeast of Kozhikode. It is the largest municipality in Wayanad in both area and population.

Vellamunda and Panamaram are towns in Mananthavady taluk, near Mananthavady.

== Etymology ==
The popular view on the etymology is that the word is derived from "Maane Eytha Vady" (English: "The place where an arrow was shot at the deer"). This view is strengthened by the existence of a place called Ambukuthy, literally "the location where the arrow pierced", on the outskirts of the town.

== History ==
=== Early history ===
From the dawn of the Neolithic Age, Wayanad has been home to a culturally rich population. The prehistoric period of the region is evidenced through the myths and traditions of various indigenous groups found here. According to an inscription found in Edakkal Cave, it appears that the Girivar tribe governed Wayanad in ancient times. The last rulers of this tribe were Arippan and Vettan, two family members of the same lineage. All the northern territories of Panamaram were under the rule of King Arippan. It was through the deceit of the Kumbala Maippadi King that the Vettan dynasty eventually lost its prominence.

Various tribes such as the Paniyar, Mullakurumar, Ooralaikkurumar, Kattu Naikkar, Adiyan, and Kurichiyar have been present in different parts of Wayanad for centuries. The Paniyar, who were permanent settlers in the mountains, and the Kurumbar, known for their prominence in the Vettan dynasty, along with the Naga Makkal of Ooralaikkurumar and the Adiyan, descendants of Keeoruthiyan and Melorachavan, are noted for their significant cultural heritage. Among these, the Adiyan tribe is most commonly found in Mananthavady after Tirunelli. The region surrounding Mananthavady is associated with myths of the Adiyan tribe connected to Thirunelli and Pakki. Their rich tradition of storytelling and singing is well known.

Mananthavady houses numerous sites related to the Paniyar tribe, extending from Palakkad to Malappuram. The Valliyoor Kavu temple, in particular, has a special place reserved for them. The Ooralaikkurumar, known for their skills in craftsmanship among the indigenous tribes, can be found in places like Tholpetty, Begur, Appapara, Panamaram, Kalpetta, Pulppally, and Mullanthara in Mananthavady. They self-produce all the essential tools and materials required by human society.

Kurichiyars, who were companions of the Pazhassi Raja, provide clear evidence that the early inhabitants of Wayanad understood the use of the wheel from ancient times. This is supported by the discovery of a wooden wheel from the riverbanks of Wayanad. Wayanad is one of the few ancient centres in India where trees were carved into circular shapes, cut into wheels, and fitted onto axles to create vehicles. An inscription from the 5th century AD by Vishnusharma is found in Edakkal Cave.

=== Regional Administration History ===
According to the inscription found in Edakkal Cave, the Girivar tribe was the governing authority in Wayanad during ancient times. The last rulers of this tribe were Arippan and Vettan, two family members from the same lineage. All the northern territories of Panamaram were under the rule of King Arippan. The Vettan dynasty eventually fell due to the deceit of the Kumbala Maippadi King. In 1810, the history of Wayanad was compiled and recorded orally by the Malabar District Court. This is also noted in Mackenzie’s manuscripts.

After the downfall of the Vettan rulers, the Kottayam Raja began governing Wayanad, having also seized the rights of the Parrayikkumithal Mādampi. During Hyder Ali's invasion, Ravi Varma, the Raja of Kottayam, sought refuge in Travancore with his family. During the second Mysore invasion, Ravi Varma returned with a military force and regained control of Wayanad. After the war, Wayanad was divided into several regions, with Ilamkur being part of the present-day Mananthavady. Vemooth Nambiar was the Mādampi (local ruler) of this region.

On March 18, 1792, the Treaty between the East India Company and Tipu Sultan transferred the sovereignty of Malabar to the British. Since the Company did not comply with the condition of handing over authority to local rulers, Pazhassi Raja took a strong stand against it. To subdue Pazhassi Raja, the British authorities employed various strategies. By the end of April 1805, Pazhassi Raja was unable to hold his ground. With the takeover of the Company’s forces by the Malabar Sub-Collector T.H. Baber, Pazhassi Raja’s position became increasingly precarious. On November 30, 1805, he met his heroic end in Mavilathottam at Pulppally. His body was brought to Mananthavady the next day under heavy guard and was interred at Thazhankari with Brahmin rituals. The stone monument erected by the British and the tree that grew on it still stand as historical witnesses. To preserve the memories of the battles and to store ammunition, the British also constructed a gunpowder magazine near Chuttakkadavu, which still stands today despite its weathered condition. Pazhassi Raja died at the age of 47. With his fall, the Kurichiyapad was plundered.

In 1856, Robinson's report indicated that the Ilamkur division, including Mananthavady, was re-divided into new administrative sections, including Vemooth and Tirunelli. By 1830, private coffee plantations were already present around Mananthavady, but it was Pugh, a Ceylonese, who started coffee plantations in Mananthavady around 1835. The initial coffee plantation was started by soldiers stationed in Mananthavady as a form of rest work. In 1854, tea plantations began in Chirakkara and Jessia. By 1892, Pyari & Company established a foothold in the area. According to William Logan's Malabar Manual of 1887, Mananthavady had offices of the Deputy Collector, Police Inspector, Sub Registrar, and Sub Assistant Conservator, among others. There were also government-run middle schools and a post office in Mananthavady. Before 1886, medical officers in Mananthavady were Europeans. There was also a club for Europeans and a canteen selling necessary goods.

During the early days of the East India Company's rule, Mananthavady was under the Talassery Sub-Collector. Later, during the British government’s rule, it came under the authority of a specific Deputy Collector. From 1859 to 1879, the Deputy Collector of Mananthavady had civil powers. In 1859, with the formation of the Forest Department, the forests of Wayanad were divided into 14 blocks. A forest officer, a Sub Assistant Conservator, and 20 forest guards were appointed for district forest management, with the Sub Assistant Conservator's office located in Mananthavady. The Mananthavady Panchayat was formed in 1935. The regions of Kaniyaram and Ozhakkodi were not included in the Panchayat at that time. The Panchayat had an area of about twenty square kilometres.

=== Socio-Cultural History ===
The agricultural characteristics of the Wayanad region, known for its fertile lands, are reflected in the agricultural sector of the Mananthavady Panchayat. Most of the agricultural lands in Mananthavady were under the jurisdiction of the Sreevalliyurkkav Devaswom and the Koilery Vadyoor Devaswom. Landowners included Brahmins, Chettiyars, and Goudas, along with tenants. The tenant-landlord relationship, which existed in earlier times, was managed through a system of rent payment in paddy, which was equivalent to the seed required for cultivation. The rate for irrigated land was five rupees per acre.

The agricultural workers for the landowners included Paniyans, Kurichiyars, Adiyans, and Kurumbas. Migration began actively in the 1930s and continued into the 1960s, with rice cultivation being the main agricultural activity. The Mananthavady Panchayat consists of Hindus, Christians, Muslims, Jains, and other groups, including Yadavs, Chettiyars, and Tamil Brahmins. The onset of World War II led to food shortages, causing an influx of Christian families from Todupuzha, Muvattupuzha, and Palai into various parts of the Panchayat. During Tipu Sultan's military campaign, the settlers of the Panchayat included families from the region and subsequent Muslim immigrants.

The indigenous communities in the Panchayat are known for their superior and diverse cultural heritage. Mananthavady was once a region with abundant wild animals. Many of the places in the Mananthavady town, which are now densely populated, were once thick forests. Roads, bridges, and electricity were very limited. Authorities took necessary measures to light up the important locations in the Panchayat at night. There was bus service to Talassery, Kozhikode, and Mysore. During World War II, when there was a shortage of petrol, buses operated using bullocks and horses. Seeking medical treatment from Krishna Vaidyan in Vadakara was a common practice for the people of Mananthavady. The malaria epidemic that affected Wayanad also reached Mananthavady. In 1946–47, there was a suspected plague outbreak, leading to the closure of Mananthavady town and the destruction of houses' roofs to eradicate rats.

Many notable local freedom fighters were active in the Panchayat. Early cinema screenings in Mananthavady were conducted through touring talkies, with the main center being in Ampukuthy. A well-known place of worship in Mananthavady is Valliyoor Kavu, which follows the Dravidian architectural style. The first Christian temple, Amaloothbhava Devalayam, was established in 1848. Initially, there was a small church at the present site and another church in Pathivayal, intended for worship by converts from the Kurichiyar community. Later, temples for different communities, including Jains and Yadavs, were built in various regions. The Pattanipalli Mosque and the Muslim mosque in the town were among the first of their kind. The worship practices of different indigenous communities and their distinct temples add to the cultural uniqueness of the Panchayat.

== Transportation ==
The Thalassery–Bavali Road passes through Mananthavady and is the town's main road, allowing connection to Mysore, Karnataka. The road to Mysore through Nagarhole National Park has been declared a National Highway by the central government; it is parallel to the Kabini River. Night travel in this road is regulated so that the road is closed from 6PM to 6AM. The highway goes from Kainatty (at the junction of NH 766) to Mysore via Bavali, Jayapura. Another road permits access to Gonikoppal, Kodagu district, 60 km (37 mi) away via Kartikulam, Tholpetty forest, Kutta and Ponnampet. The nearest railway station is Vatakara and the nearest airport is Kannur International Airport.

== Climate ==
Mananthavady experiences a tropical monsoon climate, characterized by moderate temperatures and high humidity. The monsoon season brings significant rainfall, which supports the region's lush greenery and agricultural activities. The weather is generally pleasant, with temperatures ranging from mild to warm throughout the year.

Climate data for Mananthavady, Kerala
Month	Jan	Feb	Mar	Apr	May	Jun	Jul	Aug	Sep	Oct	Nov	Dec	Year
Mean daily maximum °C (°F)	27.2 (81.0)	29.0 (84.2)	30.6 (87.1)	30.4 (86.7)	29.4 (84.9)	25.8 (78.4)	24.4 (75.9)	24.9 (76.8)	25.9 (78.6)	26.7 (80.1)	26.6 (79.9)	26.5 (79.7)	27.3 (81.1)
Mean daily minimum °C (°F)	16.7 (62.1)	18.0 (64.4)	19.6 (67.3)	20.7 (69.3)	20.9 (69.6)	19.8 (67.6)	19.4 (66.9)	19.4 (66.9)	19.3 (66.7)	19.4 (66.9)	18.6 (65.5)	17.0 (62.6)	19.1 (66.3)
Average precipitation mm (inches)	3 (0.1)	9 (0.4)	20 (0.8)	101 (4.0)	186 (7.3)	515 (20.3)	1,096 (43.1)	565 (22.2)	211 (8.3)	203 (8.0)	82 (3.2)	19 (0.7)	3,010 (118.4)
Source: Climate-Data.org

== Demographics ==
Religions in Mananthavady taluk
Hindus	46.31%
Muslims	29.52%
Christians	23.60%

Mananthavady has one of the highest Scheduled Tribes populations in Kerala, with Scheduled Tribes constituting around 22% of the population. The taluk has a religiously diverse population comprising Hindus, Muslims, Christians and members of various indigenous communities. Mananthavady is also the seat of the Syro-Malabar Eparchy of Mananthavady, which serves the area's Christian population, who trace their origins to Pala.

According to the 2011 Census of India, Muslims constituted 29.52% of the population of Mananthavady taluk, making Islam the second-largest religion in the taluk after Hinduism. Muslim communities are present throughout the taluk, with Vellamunda and Panamaram having the largest Muslim population among its grama panchayats. The area's population reflects the coexistence of different religious and indigenous communities, which have contributed to the social and cultural character of the region. The Christian population is concentrated predominantly in Mananthavady municipality and Edavaka Panchayat, whereas Hindus dominate Thirunelly.

== Municipal Councilors ==
Mananthavady Municipality Election Results
Ward No.	Ward Name	Councilor Name	Party	Alliance
001	Pancharakolli	K. V. Jubair	CPI(M)	LDF
002	Jessy	V. K. Sivan	CPI(M)	LDF
003	Pilakkavu	Pradeepan (Manoj)	INC	UDF
004	Kalliyottu	Rajila	INC	UDF
005	Kallumottamkunnu	Jinsha Sunish	CPI(M)	LDF
006	Ambukuthi	Rasina Siddique	IUML	UDF
007	Choyimoola	Sharanya M. C.	CPI(M)	LDF
008	Ondayangadi	P. T. Biju	CPI(M)	LDF
009	Vincent Giri	Biji A.	INC	UDF
010	Varadimoola	Rajanish M. R.	CPI(M)	LDF
011	Mudramoola	Anitha	CPI(M)	LDF
012	Cheroor	Kousalya Appachan	INC	UDF
013	Kurukanmoola	Shelly James Thennamkuzhiyil	INC	UDF
014	Kuruva	Shibu K. George	INC	UDF
015	Kadankolli	Lissy Jose	INC	UDF
016	Payyampally	Jacob Sebastian	INC	UDF
017	Puthiyidam	Sabitha V. P.	CPI(M)	LDF
018	Kollery	Manjula Ashokan	INC	UDF
019	Thannikal	Smitha Anilkumar	CPI(M)	LDF
020	Valliyoorkkavu	Sharanya Sreejith	CPI(M)	LDF
021	Mythrinagar	Sheeja Francis	INC	UDF
022	Chettappalam	C. Kunjabdulla	IUML	UDF
023	Arattuthara	Manoj Gopalan	INC	UDF
024	Peruvaka	Sashikumar	INC	UDF
025	Thazheyangadi	Hamsa P. K.	INC	UDF
026	Mananthavady Town	Adv. Sindhu Sebastian	Ind	UDF
027	Gorimoola	P. V. S. Moosa	IUML	UDF
028	Erumatheruvu	Annamma George	CPI(M)	LDF
029	Club Kunnu	Sajna Teacher	INC	UDF
030	Pariyaramkunnu	John	INC	UDF
031	Ozhakodi	P. V. George	INC	UDF
032	Palakkuli	Lekha Rajeevan	INC	UDF
033	Kuzhinilam	Raju Michael	CPI(M)	LDF
034	Kaniyaram	V. U. Joy	INC	UDF
035	Puthanpura	Akilesh K. S.	NCP-SP	LDF
036	Kuttimoola	Usha Kelu	CPI(M)	LDF
037	Chirakara	V. R. Praveej	CPI(M)	LDF

== Notable Landmarks ==
- Edakkal Caves – These ancient caves are renowned for their prehistoric petroglyphs and inscriptions, providing insights into the early history of the region.
- Valliyoor Kavu Temple – An important religious site known for its Dravidian architectural style and historical significance.
- Pazhassi Raja's Resting place – The Pazhassi Tomb and Museum, a significant memorial dedicated to one of Kerala’s esteemed heroes, is located in Mananthavady. Kerala Varma Pazhassi Raja, celebrated as the Lion of Kerala, is honoured here for his unwavering loyalty to his people until the end. The tomb, built on the site where the King was cremated, stands on the banks of the Kabani River. In 1996, it was transformed into a museum that now displays various items of memorabilia related to Pazhassi Raja.
- Kabini River – One of the 44 rivers of Kerala. It forms part of the eastern boundary of Mananthavady and is known for its picturesque landscapes and wildlife.

== See also ==
- Vellamunda
- Kattikkulam
- Thirunelly
- Boys Town, Mananthavady
- Thalappuzha, Wayanad
- Palchuram
