= Boys Town =

Boys Town or Boystown may refer to:

== Places ==
- Boystown, Chicago, a gay village in Chicago, USA
- Boys Town, Nebraska, a suburb of Omaha, USA
- Boy's Town (prostitution), Mexican US-border district with legal prostitution
- Boyztown, a gay red-light district in Pattaya, Thailand
- Boy's Town, Wayanad, India

== Schools ==
- BoysTown (Beaudesert), a former school in Australia
- Boys' Town (Engadine), a school in New South Wales, Australia
- Boys Town Jerusalem, an orphanage in Israel

== Sports ==
- Boys' Town F.C., a Jamaican football club
- Boys' Town Cricket Club, a football club, Kingston, Jamaica

== Media ==
- Boys Town (film), 1938 American film
- Boystown (film), 2007 Spanish film

== Organizations and commerce ==
- Boys Town (organization), for at-risk children, in Boys Town, Nebraska
- Boystown (website), a child pornography website
- Manila Boys' Town Complex, an orphanage for boys and girls and elderly home in Marikina, Philippines

== See also ==
- Girls Town (disambiguation)
