= Girls About Town =

Girls About Town may refer to:

- Girls About Town (EP), a 1980 EP by The Smithereens
- Girls About Town (film), a 1931 comedy film directed by George Cukor

== See also ==
- Girl About Town, 1948-1949 American TV series
- Girls Town (disambiguation), films
- "Girls in our Town", 1976 song
- Small Town Girl (disambiguation)
- Three Girls About Town, 1941 film
