= Ernesto Beren =

Filipino gymnast (born 1950)

- Born: February 28, 1950 (age 76)
- Height: 1.58 m (5 ft 2 in)

Gymnastics career
- Discipline: Men's artistic gymnastics
- Country represented: Philippines

Ernesto Beren (born February 28, 1950) is a Filipino gymnast. He competed in four events at the 1968 Summer Olympics.

== Early life and education ==
Beren was a resident of Manila Boystown along with Norman Henson until he finished his high school studies. In Boystown, Catholic priest Jose Mirasol encouraged him to get involved in sporting activities.

== Gymnastics career ==
After Beren left Boystown, he and Norman Henson went on to qualify for the 1968 Summer Olympics.

== Post-gymnastics career ==
He was a Philippine Navy personnel and a film actor. He also worked with the Philippine Sports Commission as a venue manager and the handler of the Rizal Memorial Sports Complex's gymnastics center.

== Legacy ==
The two were the last gymnasts to compete for the Philippines at the Summer Olympics until Carlos Yulo's appearance at the 2020 Summer Olympics in 2021. Beren himself helped kickstart Yulo's career when he met him at Leveriza, Manila and gave training tips to the young boy.
