= Favstar =

Twitter usage tracking website

- Website: Favstar.fm
- Launched: July 2009

Favstar (also known as Favstar.fm) was an online service that tracked Twitter activity, launched in July 2009. Favstar utilized Twitter's API to rank tweets based on popularity metrics such as Favorites and Retweets. The platform gained popularity among users who wanted to see trending tweets and engage with popular content.

Favstar ceased operations on June 19, 2018, when Twitter deprecated the API it relied on for its functionality. This decision was part of a broader overhaul of Twitter's API system, which aimed to limit third-party applications' access to certain features. In a statement regarding the shutdown, Favstar's creator, Tim Haines, expressed that the uncertainty surrounding Twitter's API changes made it impractical for Favstar to continue operating.

Following the shutdown of Favstar, many users and developers of other third-party Twitter applications expressed concerns about the impact of Twitter's API changes on their services. The deprecation of the legacy APIs, originally scheduled for June 19, was later postponed to August 16, 2018, allowing some developers additional time to transition to the new system. However, the eventual shutdown of Favstar highlighted the challenges faced by third-party developers in adapting to Twitter's evolving platform policies.
