= RavMonE =

Computer trojan

Malware details
- Technical name: Win32.RJump.A
- Aliases: Rajump, Jisx, Siweol, Bdoor-DIJ
- Type: Trojan
- Subtype: Worm
- Classification: Virus
- Family: RJump
- Isolation date: June 2006
- Origin: Unknown
- Author: Unknown

RavMonE, also known as RJump, is a Trojan that opens a backdoor on computers running Microsoft Windows. Once a computer is infected, the virus allows unauthorized users to gain access to the computer's contents. This poses a security risk for the infected machine's user, as the attacker can steal personal information, and use the computer as an access point into an internal network.

RavMonE was made famous in September 2006 when a number of iPod videos were shipped with the virus already installed. Because the virus only infects Windows computers, it can be inferred that Apple's contracted manufacturer was not using Macintosh computers. Apple came under some public criticism for releasing the virus with their product.

== Description ==
RavMonE is a worm written in the Python scripting language and was converted into a Windows executable file using the Py2Exe tool. It attempts to spread by copying itself to mapped and removable storage drives. It can be transmitted by opening infected email attachments and downloading infected files from the Internet. It can also be spread through removable media, such as CD-ROMs, flash memory, digital cameras and multimedia players.

== Action ==
Once the virus is executed, it performs the following tasks.

1. It copies itself to %WINDIR% as RavMonE.exe.
2. It adds the value "RavAV" = "%WINDIR%\RavMonE.exe" to the registry key HKEY_LOCAL_MACHINE\SOFTWARE\Microsoft\Windows\CurrentVersion\Run.
3. It opens a random port and accepts remote commands.
4. It creates a log file RavMonLog to store the port number.
5. It posts a HTTP request to advise the attacker of the infected computer's IP address and the number of the port opened.

When a removable storage device is connected to the infected computer it copies the following files to that device:

- autorun.inf - a script to execute the worm the next time the device is connected to a computer
- msvcr71.dll - in case the target device lacks this support, Microsoft C Runtime Library module containing standard functions such as to copy memory and print to the console
- ravmon.exe - a copy of the worm

== Aliases ==
- Backdoor.Rajump (Symantec)
- W32/Jisx.A.worm (Panda)
- W32/RJump-C (Sophos)
- W32/RJump.A!worm (Fortinet)
- Win32/RJump.A (ESET)
- Win32/RJump.A!Worm (CA)
- Worm.RJump.A (BitDefender)
- Worm.Win32.RJump.a (Kaspersky)
- Worm/Rjump.E (Avira)
- WORM_SIWEOL.B (TrendMicro)
- Worm/Generic.AMR (AVG)
- INF:RJump[Trj](Avast!)
