= GLScene =

- The GLScene interface
- Stable release: 2.6 / June 13, 2026; 3 months ago
- Written in: Pascal
- Operating system: Linux and Microsoft Windows
- Platform: Intel x86 - 32-bit
- License: Mozilla Public Licence 1.1
- Website: glscene.sourceforge.net
- Repository: sourceforge.net/projects/glscene/files/ github.com/GLScene/GLScene

GLScene is a free OpenGL-based library for Delphi, C++ and Free Pascal. It provides visual components and objects allowing description and rendering of 3D scenes.

Development of the original library was started in 1999 by Mike Lischke and at version 0.5 the library was made Open Source and placed in the care of project administrator Eric Grange.

GLScene allows programmers to create OpenGL 3D objects at design-time using the interface shown. A wide range of objects and additional VCL controls are provided to help the programmer to build powerful 3D Delphi applications.

GLScene is supported by its user-base and comes with a number of demonstration applications and examples. Beginning with version 1.2 it also supports the C++Builder and Lazarus IDE for Free Pascal.
