= CLX =

The acronym CLX can refer to a number of things:

- 160 in Roman numerals
- Cargolux, an airline using the ICAO code CLX
- Clorox stock ticker
- CLX (Common Lisp), a Common Lisp computer library
- CLX Communications, a telecommunications and cloud communications platform as a service company, based in Stockholm, Sweden
- Component Library for Cross Platform (CLX), a cross-platform visual component-based framework
- CLX Motorsport, a Swiss auto racing team
- Chirala railway station, Andhra Pradesh, India
