= Free Pascal Runtime Library =

Interaction of class libraries and widgetsets in Lazarus and Free Pascal

The Free Pascal Runtime Library, abbreviated RTL, is Free Pascal's runtime library.

The RTL consists of a collection of units that provide components and classes for general programming tasks. It acts as a basis for Free Pascal's Free Component Library (FCL) and the Lazarus Component Library (LCL). The RTL is licensed under the LGPL with a static linking exception.
