= Third-party software component =

Type of reusable software component

In computer programming, a third-party software component is a reusable software component developed to be either freely distributed or sold by an entity other than the original vendor of the development platform. The third-party software component market is supported by the belief that component-oriented development improves efficiency and quality when developing custom applications. Common third-party software includes macros, bots, and software/scripts to be run as add-ons for popular developing software. In the case of operating systems such as Windows XP, Vista or 7, there are applications installed by default, such as Windows Media Player or Internet Explorer.

== See also ==
- Middleware
- Enterprise Java Beans
- VCL / CLX
- KParts (KDE)
- Video-game third-party developers
- Third-party source
