= Free Component Library =

Interaction of class libraries and widgetsets in Lazarus and Free Pascal

The Free Component Library, abbreviated FCL, is a software component library for Free Pascal.

The FCL consists of a collection of units that provide components and classes for general programming tasks. Although it is intended to be compatible with Delphi's Visual Component Library (VCL) the FCL is restricted to non-visual components. On the other hand, its functionality partly exceeds that of the VCL.

Visual components are provided by the Lazarus Component Library (LCL).

The FCL is based on the Free Pascal Runtime Library (RTL).
