= Palchuram =

Mountain pass in Kerala, India

Coordinates: 11.835502°N 75.857202°E

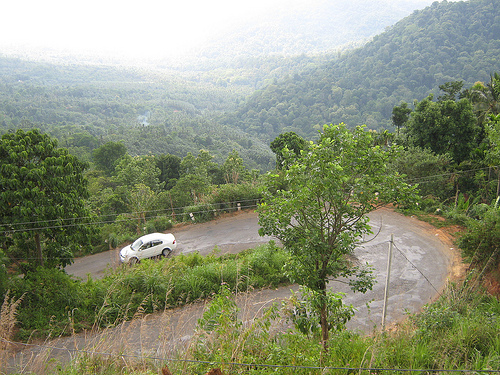
The Palchuram or 'Milky Way'

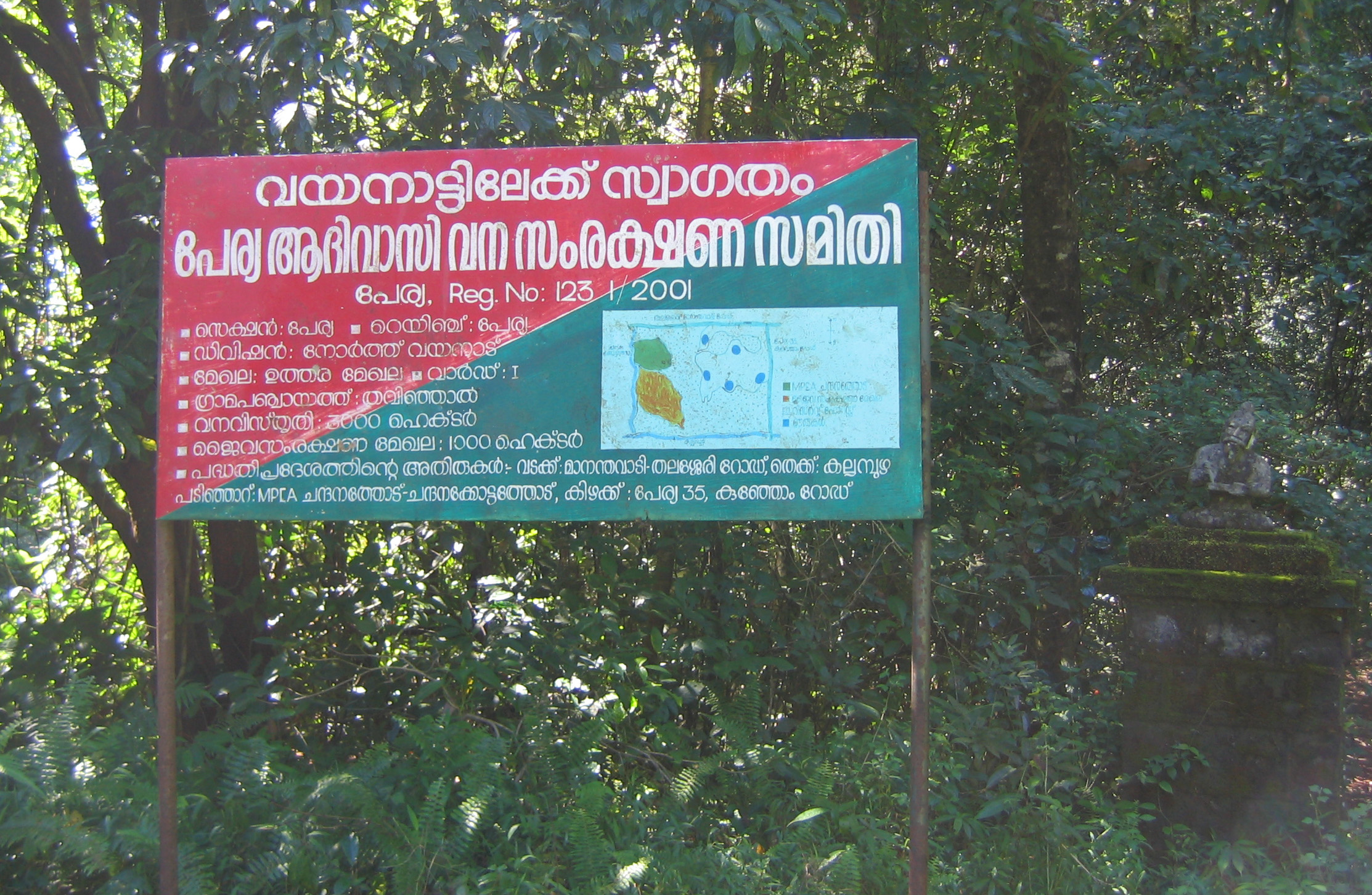
Welcome to Wayanad

Palchuram is a mountain pass located in Kottiyoor Wildlife Sanctuary of Kerala, India across the Western Ghats.

Height of Palchuram is 3,000 ft (910 m). Palchuram is known for its scenic Palchuram Waterfalls, a four-stage waterfall located within a dense forest. The area is also famous for its hairpin bends, offering tourists scenic views and photography opportunities. It is also a popular trekking destination due to its natural beauty and the challenging footpath to the waterfalls.

== Location ==
Palchuram is located 22 kilometres (14 mi) west of Mananthavady town, adjacent to the Boys Town village. There is a spiral hairpin road here going all the way down to Kottiyoor in Kannur district.

== Post office ==
There is a post office at Ambayathode and the pin code is 674651

== Education ==
- St George LP School, Ambayathode, Kottiyoor
- St George UP School, Ambayathode, Kottiyoor
- IJMHS Kottiyoor

== Tourist attraction ==
The Palchuram Hairpin Bends attract many tourists for the photographic options it offers. There are a few temples and churches in the area.

Palchuram Falls is a four-step waterfall with a height of 300 metres (980 ft). It is 2 kilometres (1.2 mi) from Boys Town junction. The footpath to the falls is quiet dangerous and tiring.

== Image gallery ==
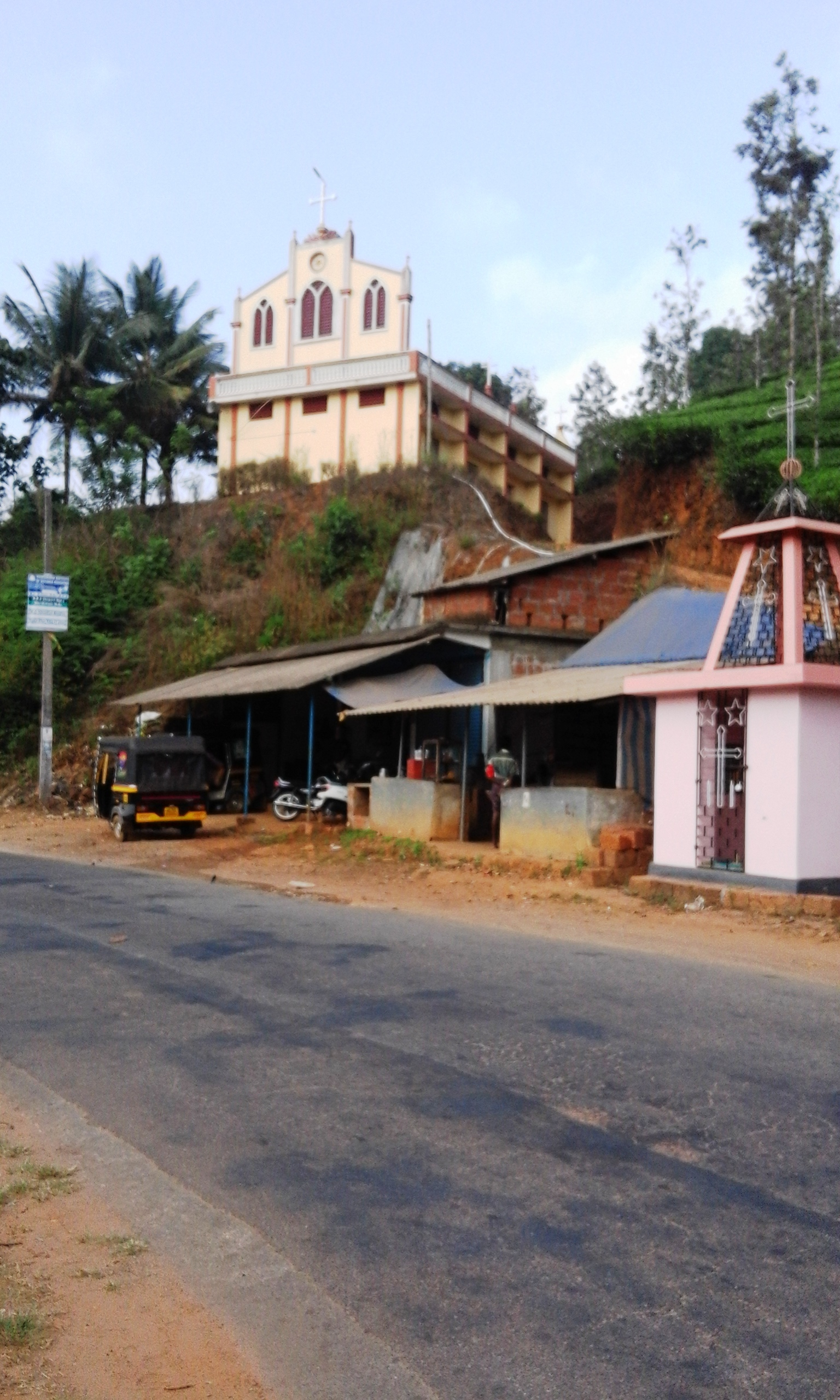
Yacobite Church, Periya

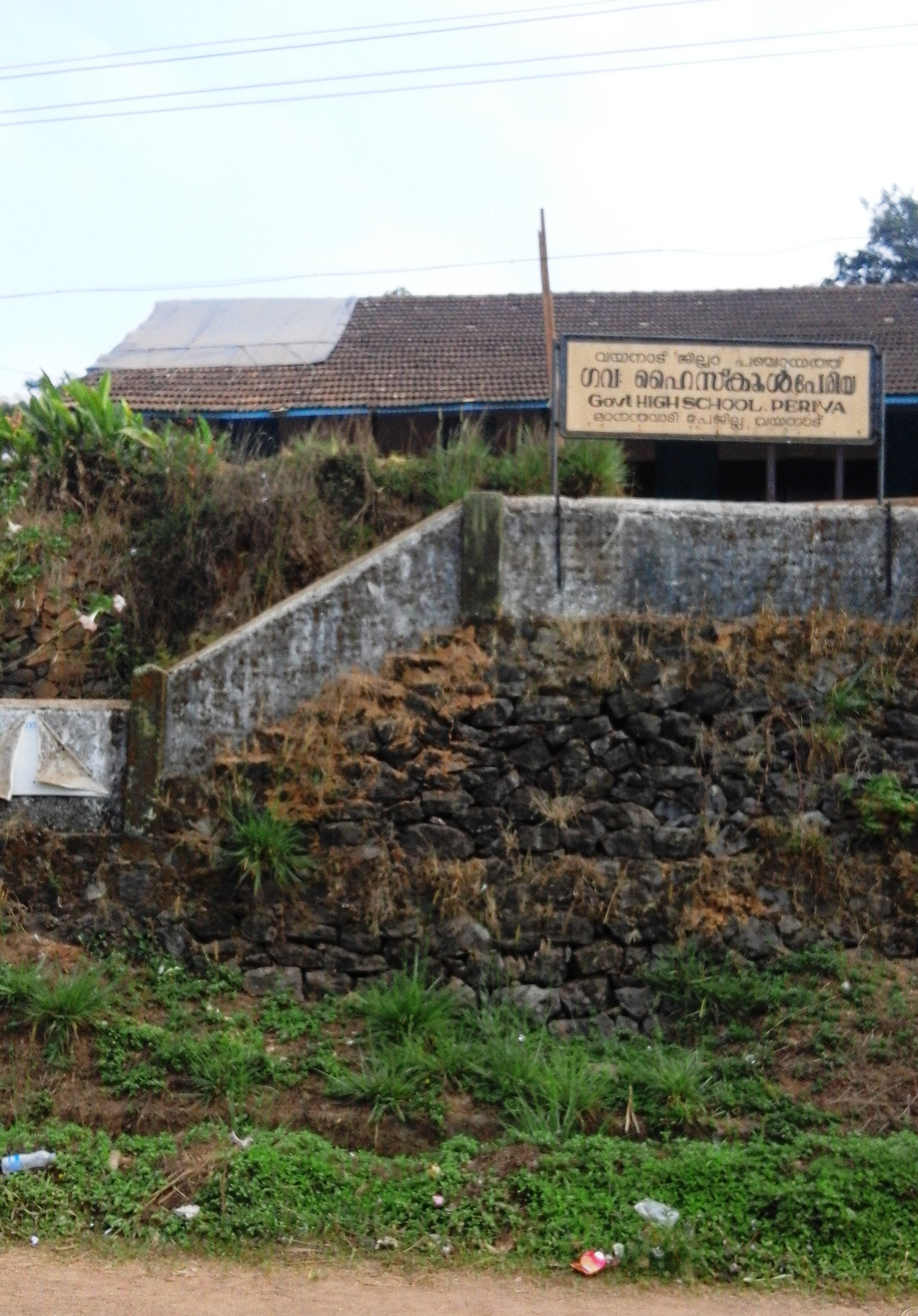
Periya Highschool

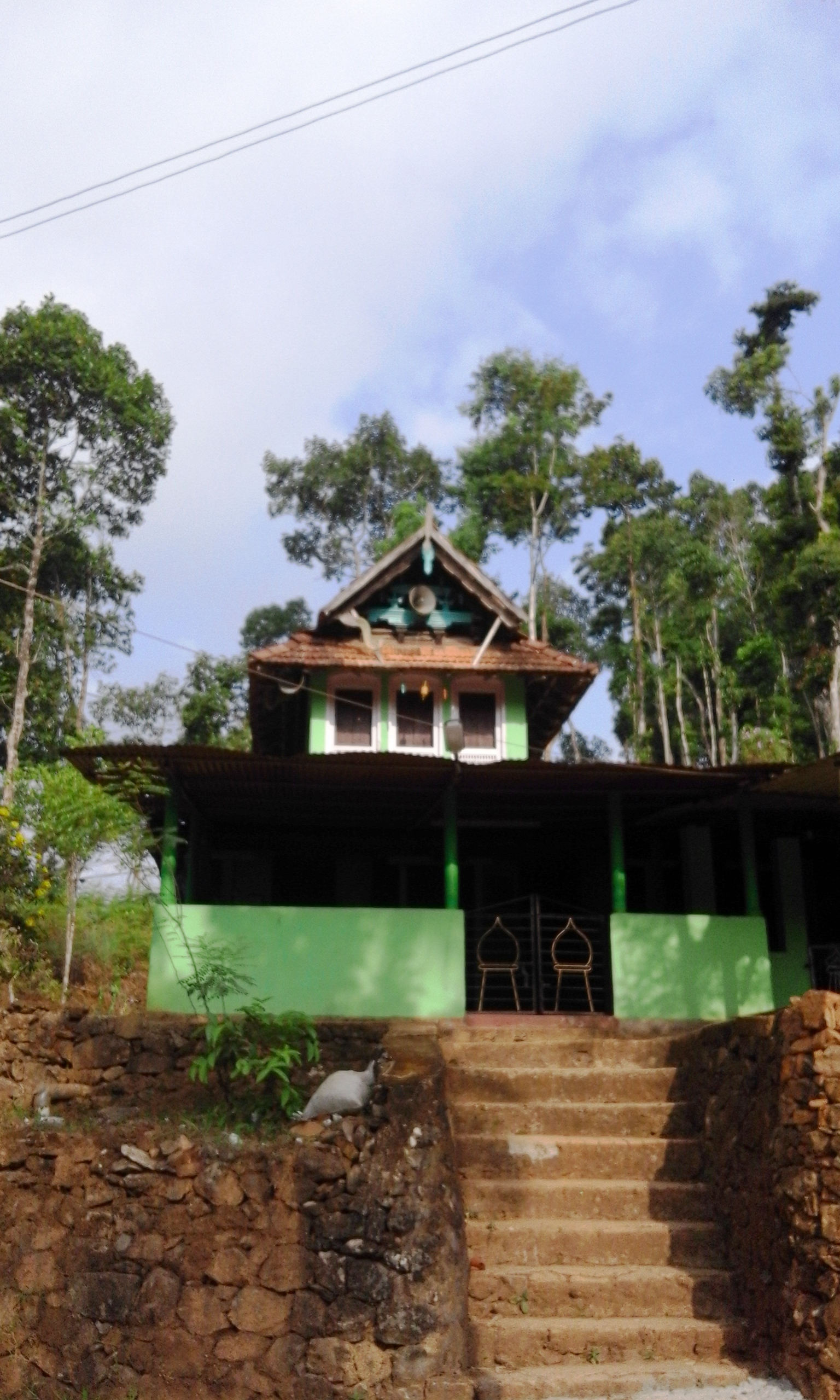
Old Srambia at Periya

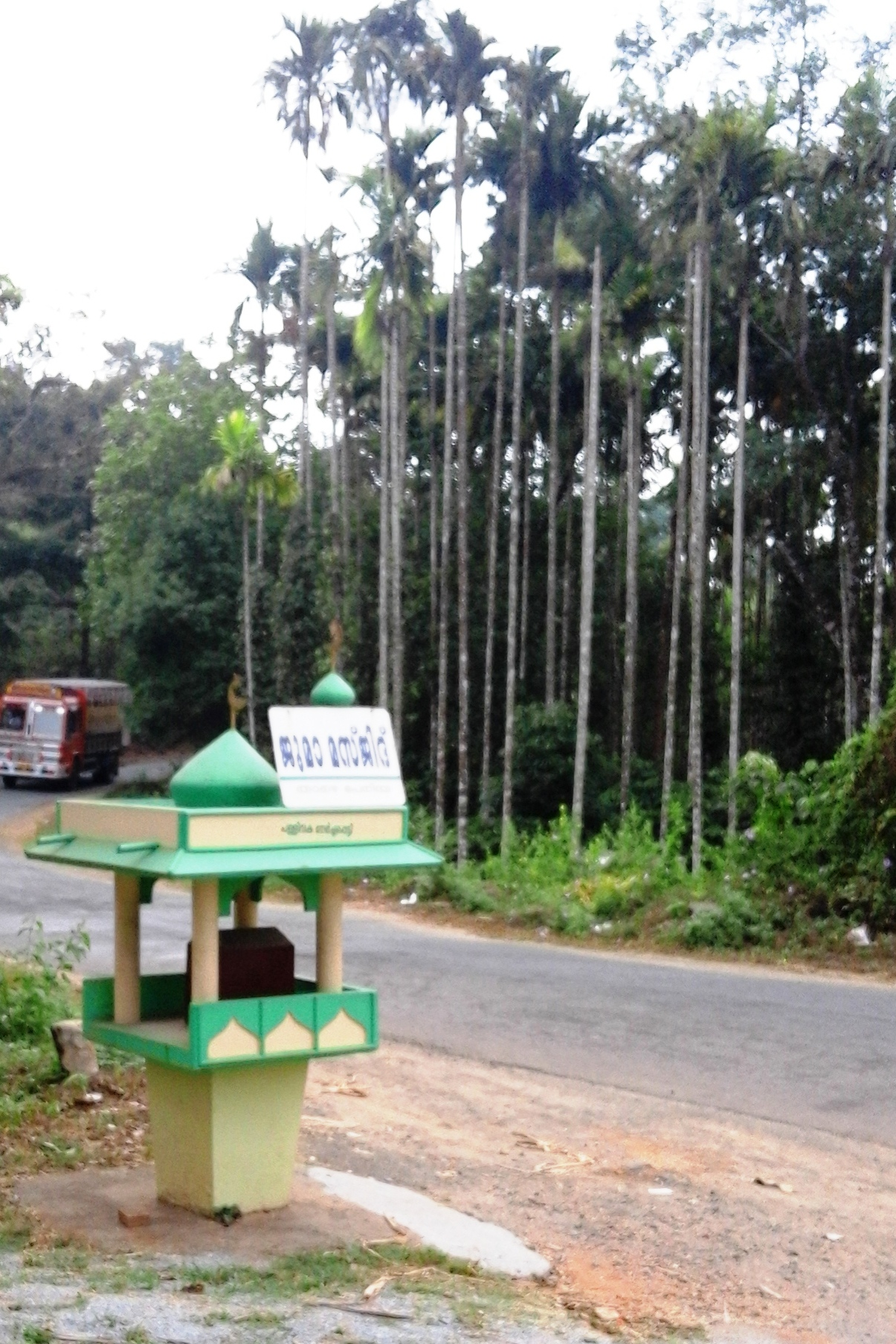
Thazhe Periya

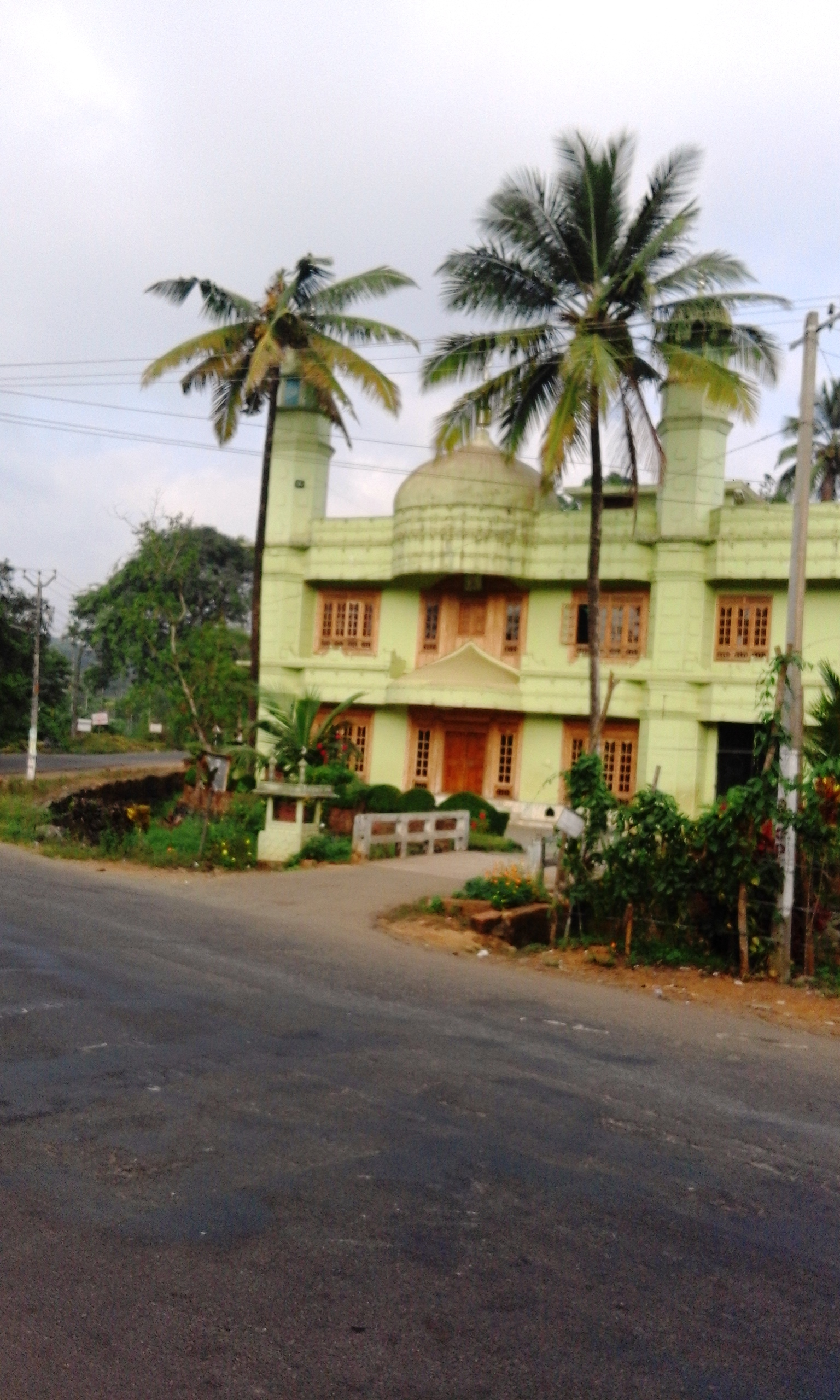
Sunni mosque in Periya town

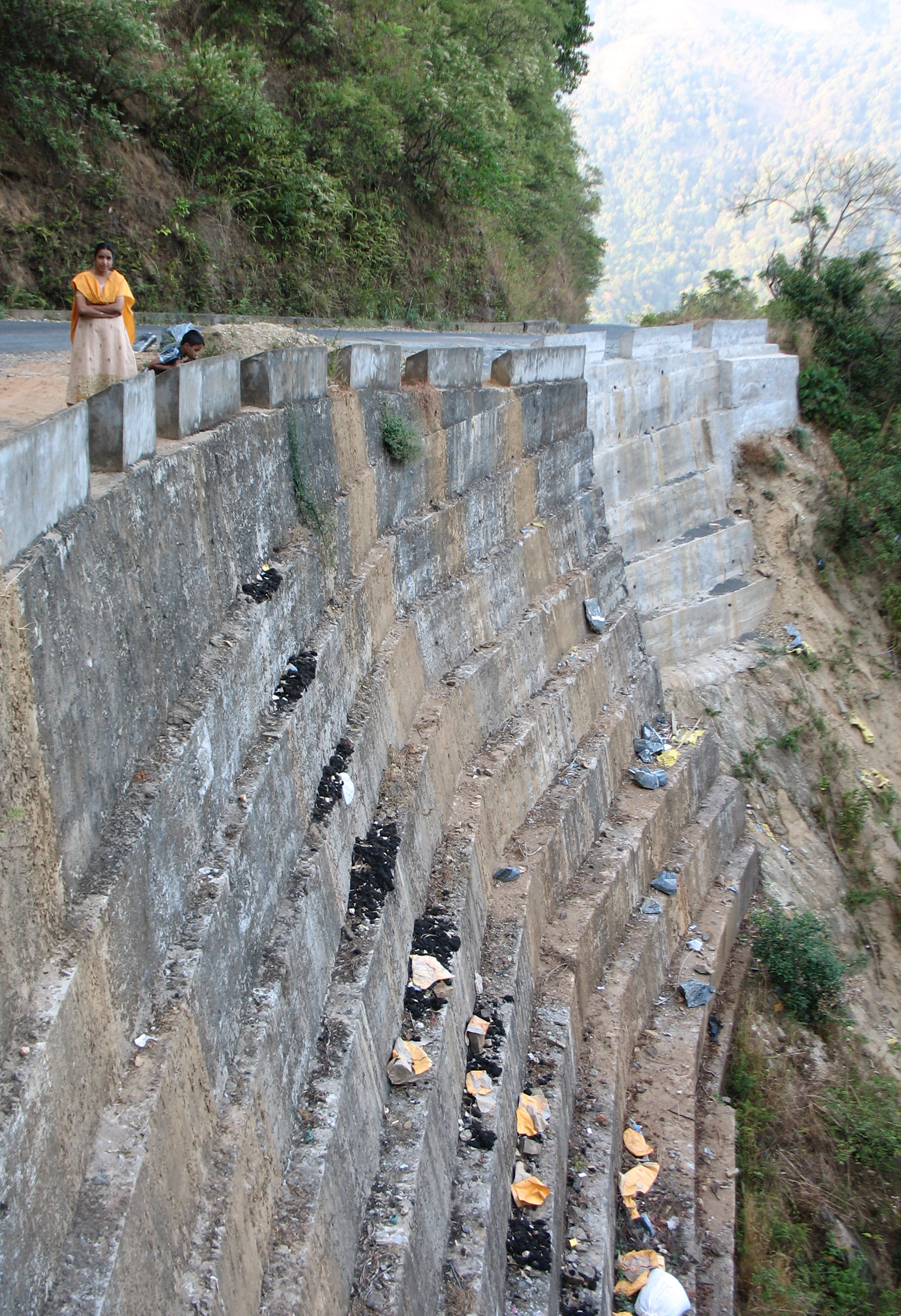
The roadwork at Palchuram

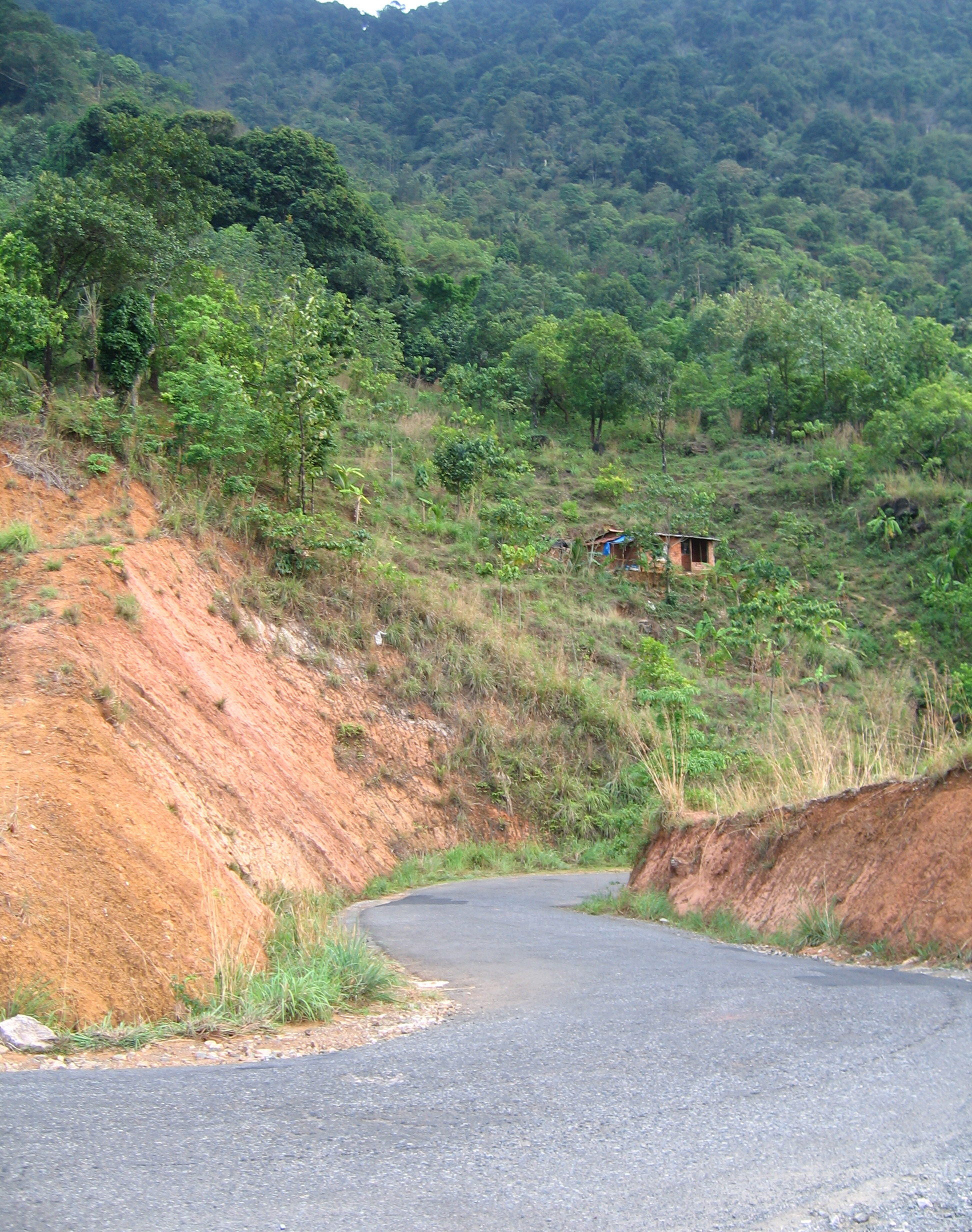
The road down to Kuthuparamba

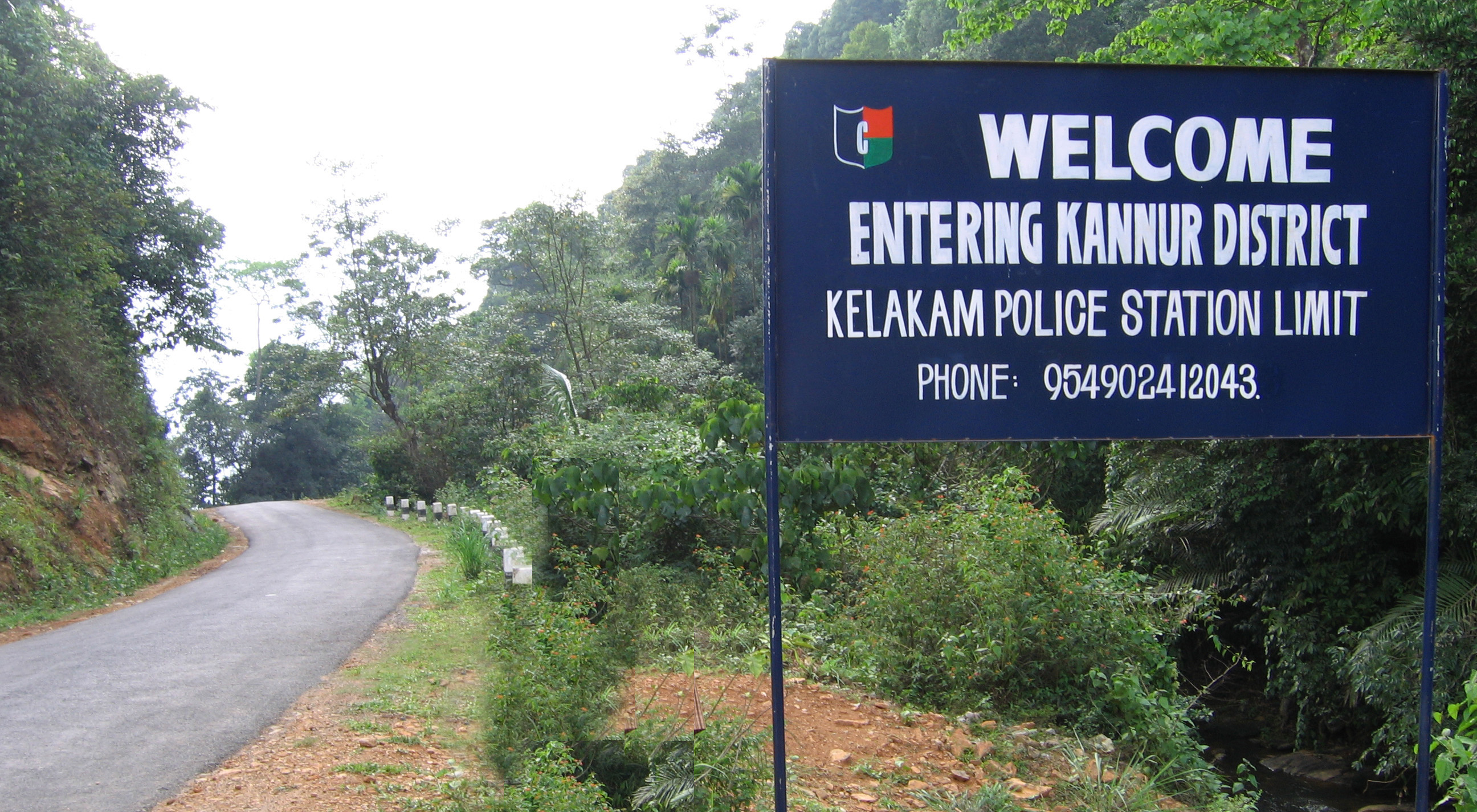
End of the road

== See also ==
- Thavinchal
- Thalappuzha
