= Widgetset =

Interaction of class libraries and widgetsets in Lazarus and Free Pascal

Widgetsets support platform-sensitive development with the Lazarus IDE system. They act as adapter libraries that provide an interface between a platform-independent sourcecode written in Free Pascal and platform-specific system functions. Thus they allow for development of platform-native software without requiring to provide specific source code for different target platforms.

Widgetsets act as basis for the Lazarus Component Library (LCL).

== Available widgetsets ==
Currently (June 2020), the development status of widget toolkit interfaces is roughly as follows:

Widget set	Supported operating systems	Status
Windows API, GDI	Windows	Mainstream use
Windows CE API, GDI	Windows CE	Mainstream use
GTK+ 1.2.x	Linux (via X11)	Deprecated
GTK+ 2.8+	Linux (X11 and framebuffer), Windows, and Mac OS X (via X11)	Mainstream use
GTK+ 3.x	As Gtk2	Alpha
Qt 4.5+, 5.6+	Linux (X11 and framebuffer), Windows, Mac OS X	Mainstream use. Works in Windows, Linux, Mac OS X, Maemo, etc
Cocoa	Mac OS X	In progress
Carbon	Mac OS X	Mainstream use
fpGUI	Windows, Windows CE, Linux (via X11)	Initial stage
Lazarus Custom Drawn Controls	Android, Windows, Linux (via X11), Mac OS X	Initial stage
