= Boyztown =

Gay red-light district in Pattaya, Thailand

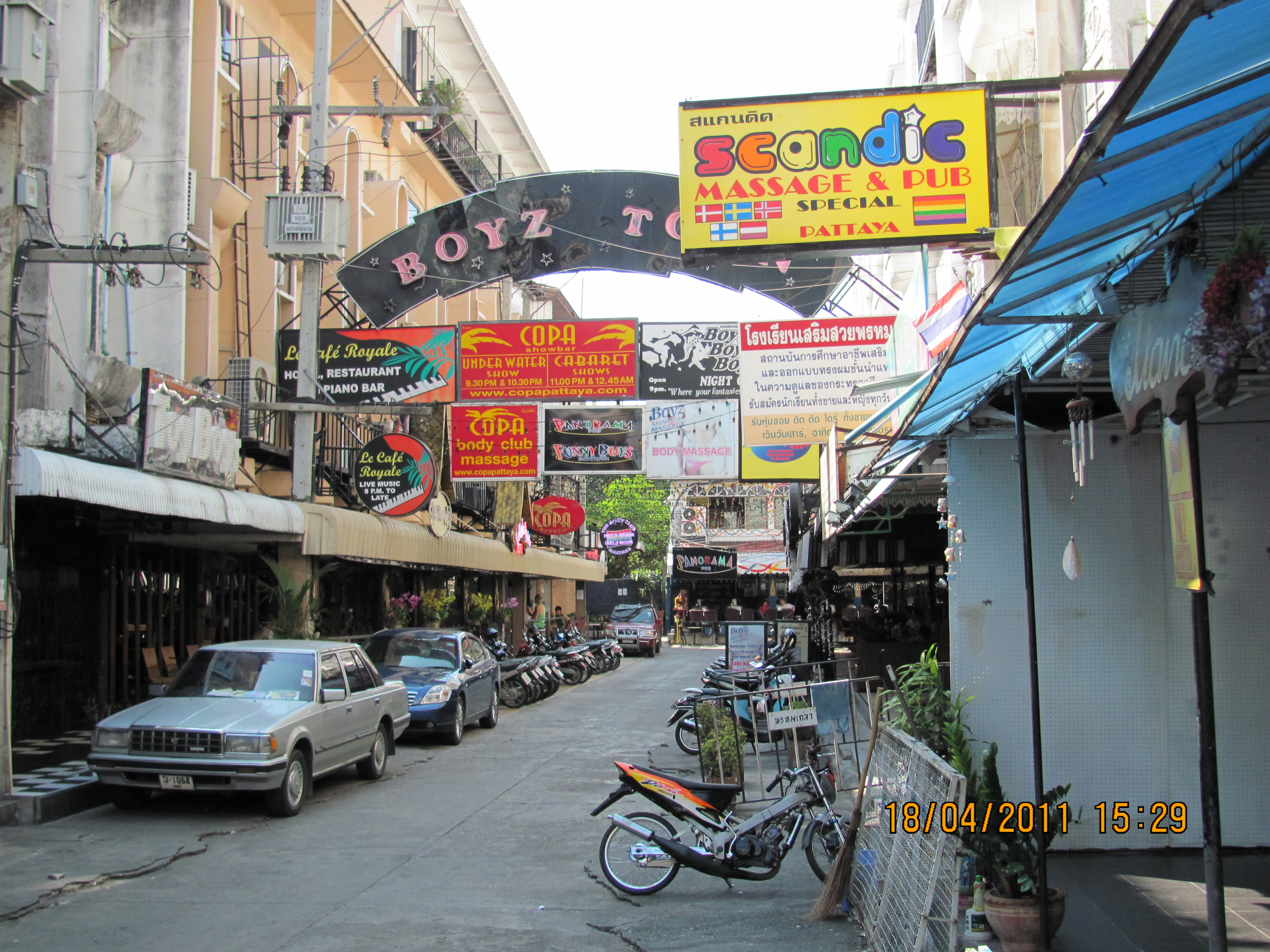
- Entrance to Boyztown in 2011
- Interactive map of Boyztown
- Addresses: Soi 3
- Location: Pattaya, Thailand
- Coordinates: 12.9278°N 100.8761°E
- North end: Soi 13/4
- South end: Second Street

Other
- Known for: Gay red-light district

Boyztown (Thai: บอยซ์ทาวน์), formerly Boystown, is a gay red-light district in Pattaya, Thailand. It is located in Pattayaland Soi 3, between Soi 13/4 and 13/5. Established in the 1980s, it reached its height in prominence in the 1990s and 2000s, before declining in the 2010s and 2020s.

== History ==
Founded in the 1980s, Boyztown was the first gay venue in Pattaya. The area soon became a popular nightlife spot for gay travellers and locals, particularly gay Europeans, with a range of different places, such as hotels, pubs, restaurants, cabaret show bars, and go-go bars. In the 1990s and early 2000s, Boyztown reached its peak as the center of gay entertainment in Pattaya before the establishment of similar venues in Sunee plaza and Jomtien, which acted as competition to venues in Boyztown.

=== Decline ===
Into 2010, the area's prominence began to decline as the numbers of European tourists dropped. A shift of the area also took place; many straight visitors found the central location in south Pattaya a good location for their stay in town. The 2010s saw a growth in Chinese tourists through tour groups before the COVID-19 pandemic. The decade also saw social media and gay contract apps cause a decline in demand for gay entertainment venues. Following the start of the COVID-19 pandemic in 2020, the area suffered from the lack of tourists caused by pandemic restrictions.

== Charity Work ==
Throughout the decades of its existence Boyztown and its business owners have been active in charity work through a foundation called "Pattaya Gay Festival" and, since 2010, "Pattaya Pride". Donations have been made for several foundations including HIV and AIDS projects.
