= Boys Town, Mananthavady =

Village in Kerala, India

Boys Town
- Village
- Location in Kerala, India Boys Town (India)
- Coordinates: 11.8402704°N 75.9194691°E
- Country: India
- State: Kerala
- District: Wayanad

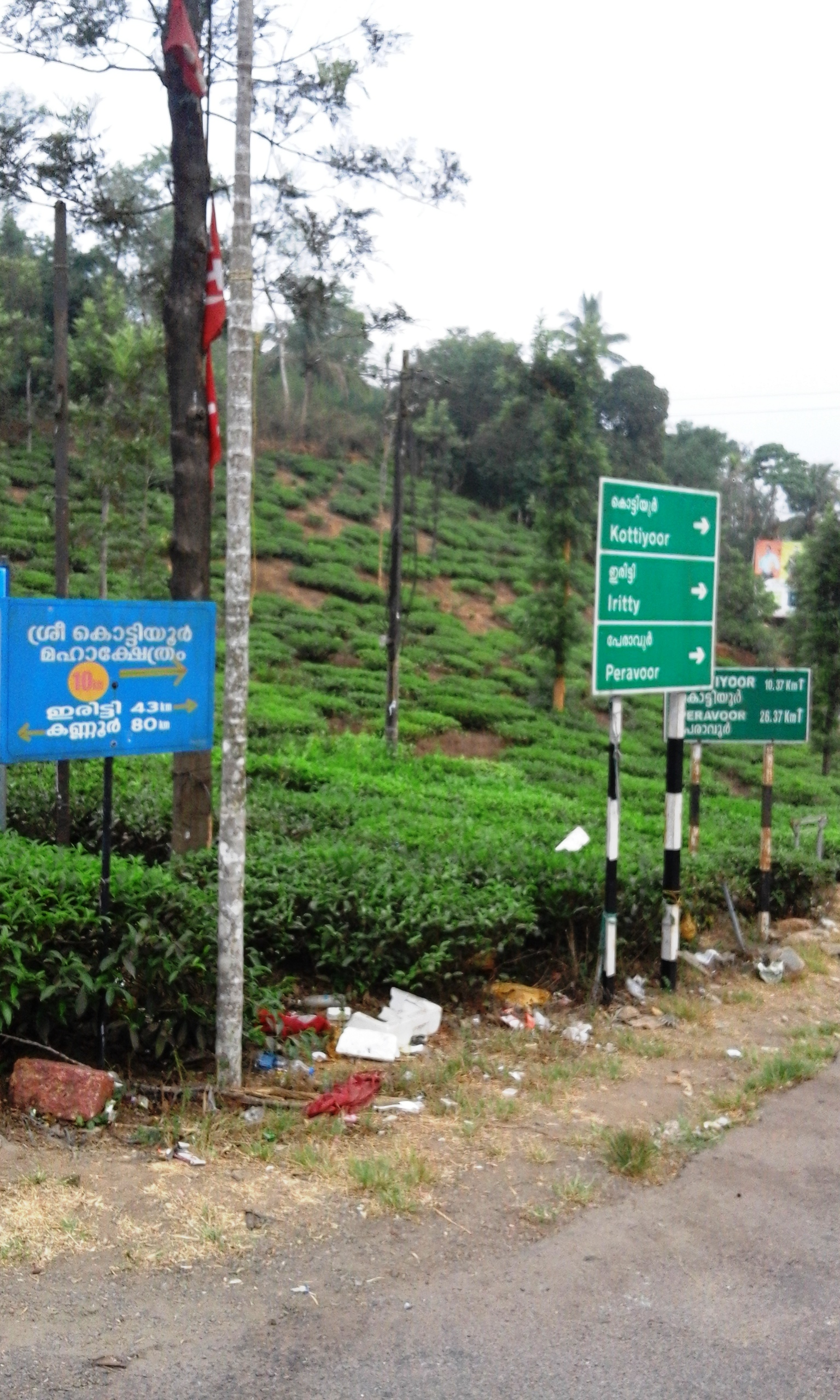
Boys Town T-junction

Boys Town is a village in the Mananthavady taluk in the Wayanad district of Kerala, India. The village is 13 km (8.1 mi) from Mananthavady.

== Tourism ==
The village attracts visitors because of the undulating tea plantations in this area. Most of the tourists are day trippers as there are no hotels here. Only one tea-shop is available at the Boys Town Junction.

=== Tourist attractions ===
- Herbal Garden
- Nature Care center
- Seri culture center
- Perma culture center
- Gene Park (Indo-Danish Project)

== Transportation ==
Boys town can be accessed from Mananthavady town. The Periya ghat road connects Mananthavady to Kannur and Thalassery. The Thamarassery mountain road connects Calicut with Kalpetta. The Kuttiady mountain road connects Vatakara with Kalpetta and Mananthavady. The Palchuram mountain road connects Kannur and Iritty with Mananthavady. The road from Nilambur to Ooty is also connected to Wayanad through the village of Meppadi.

The nearest railway station is at Thalassery and the nearest airports are Kannur International Airport (58 km (36 mi)), Kozhikode International Airport 120 km (75 mi)) and Bengaluru International Airport (290 km (180 mi)).

== Gallery ==
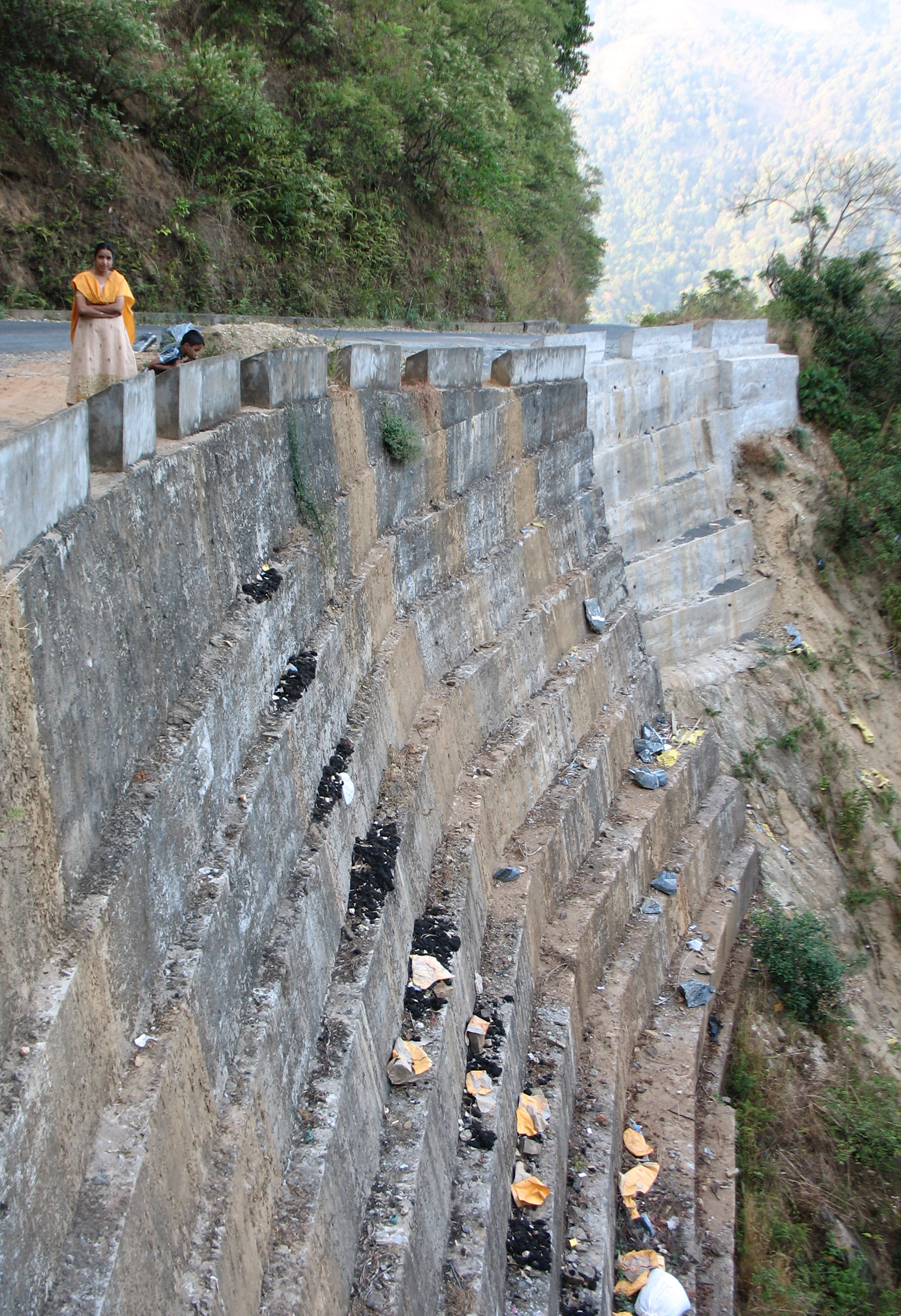
The Hairpin Road

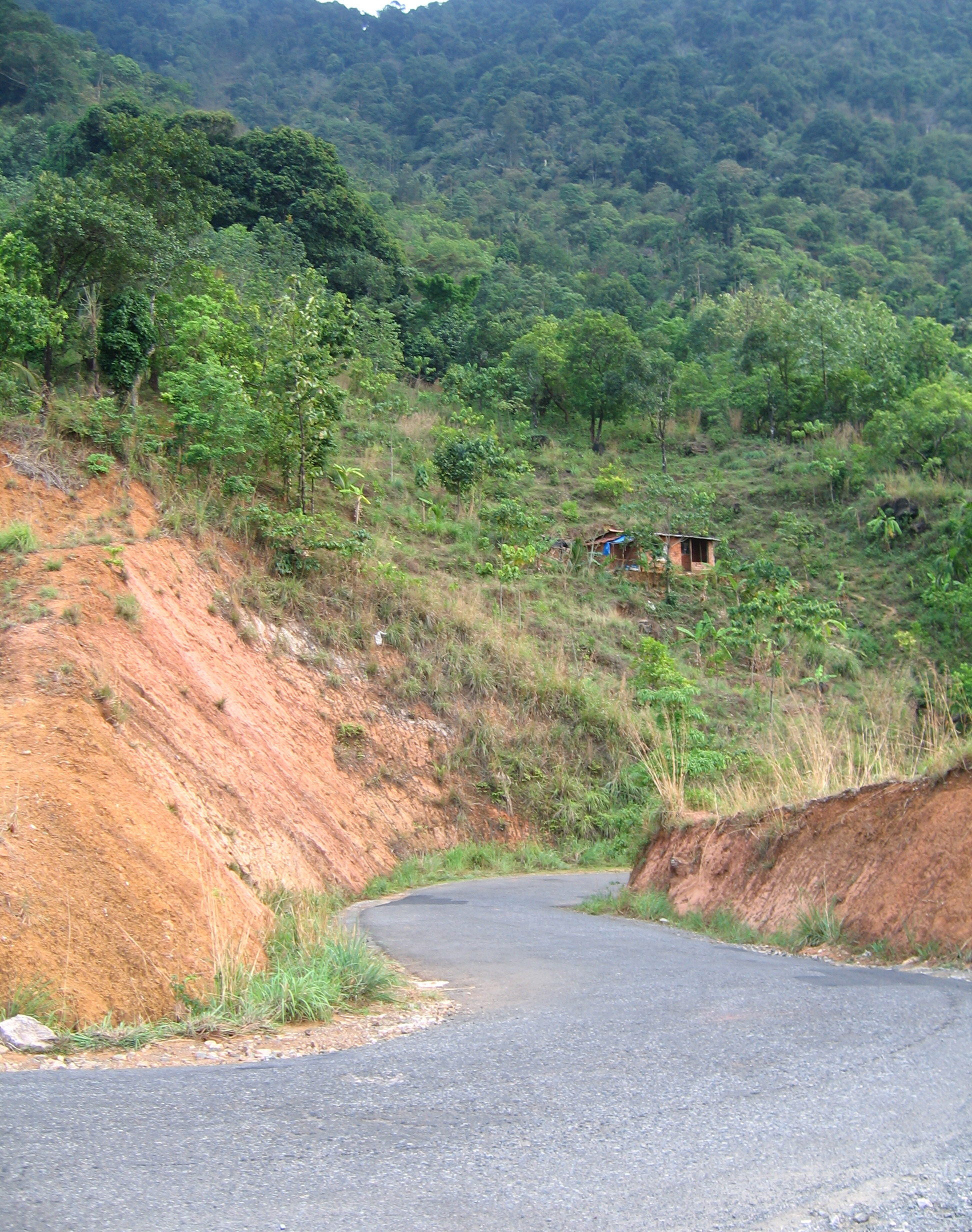
A view of Palchuram

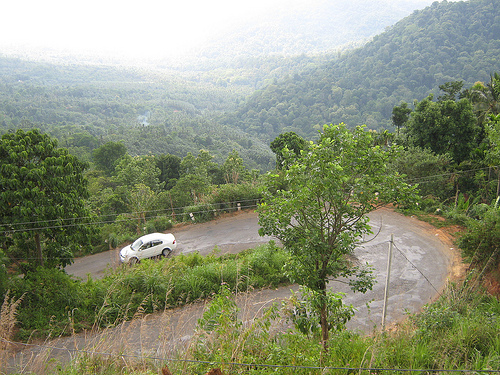
Palchuram

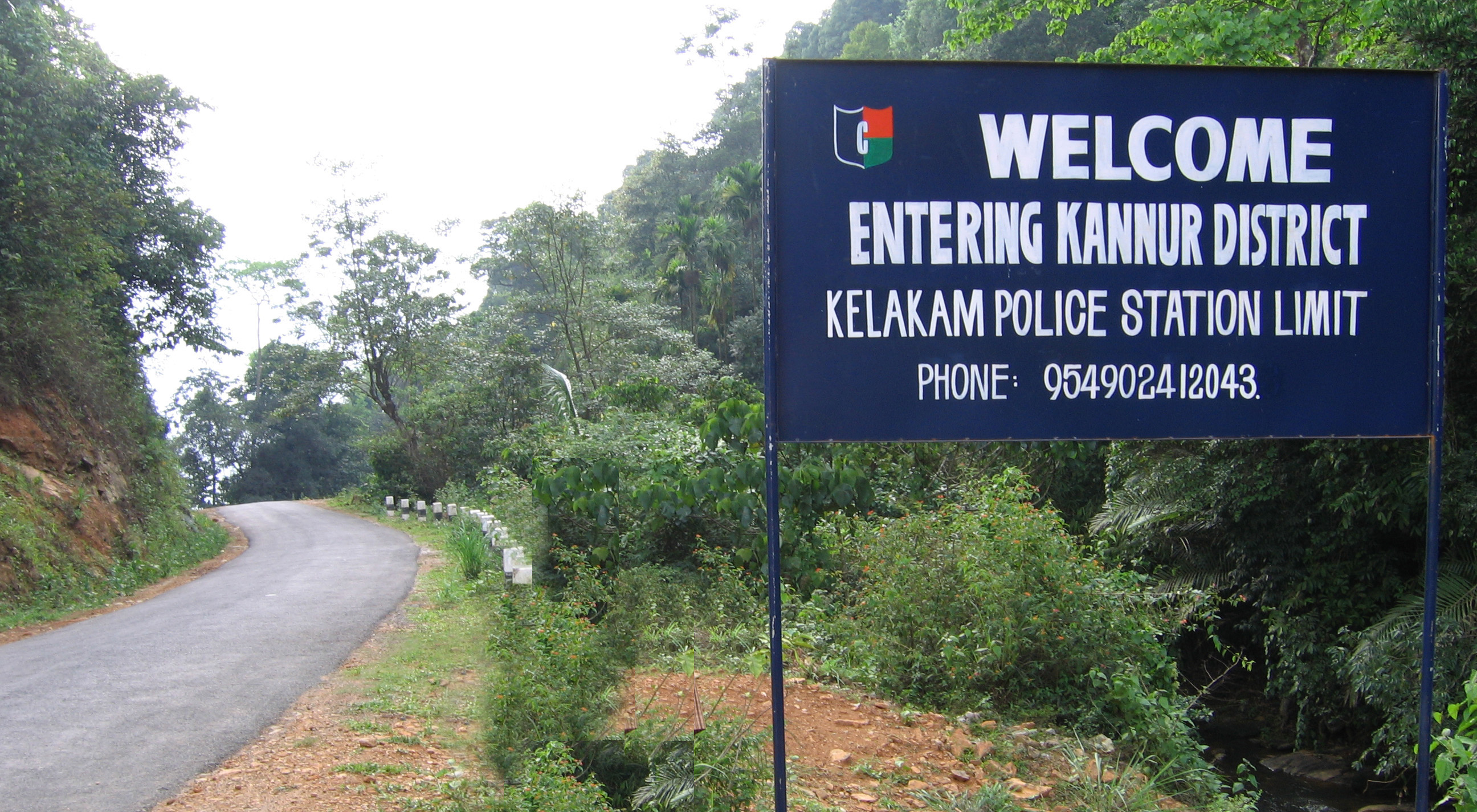
End of the road

== See also ==
- Thavinjal
- Thalappuzha
- Palchuram
- Kottiyoor
