= Small Town Girl =

Small Town Girl may refer to:

== Film ==
- A Small Town Girl, a 1914 American silent drama film, considered to be lost, starring Lon Chaney Sr.
- Small Town Girl (1936 film), an American romantic comedy starring Janet Gaynor, Robert Taylor, and James Stewart
- Small Town Girl (1953 film), an American musical starring Jane Powell, Farley Granger, and Ann Miller

== Music ==
- Small Town Girl (album), a 2006 album by Kellie Pickler, or the title song
- "Small Town Girl" (song), a 1987 song by Steve Wariner
- "Small Town Girl", a song by Andy Bull
- "Small Town Girl", a song by Good Shoes from Think Before You Speak
- "Small Town Girl", a song by John Cafferty & The Beaver Brown Band from Tough All Over
