= Boystown (website) =

Defunct child pornography website

- Logo
- Website type: Child pornography file sharing
- Launched: June 2019
- Current status: Offline (as of mid-April 2021)

Boystown (stylized in logo as BOYS TOWN) was a child pornography website run through the Tor network as an onion service. It launched in June 2019 and was shut down by authorities in April 2021. Four German administrators of the site confessed and were sentenced from 7 to 12 years in prison in December 2022.

== Site ==
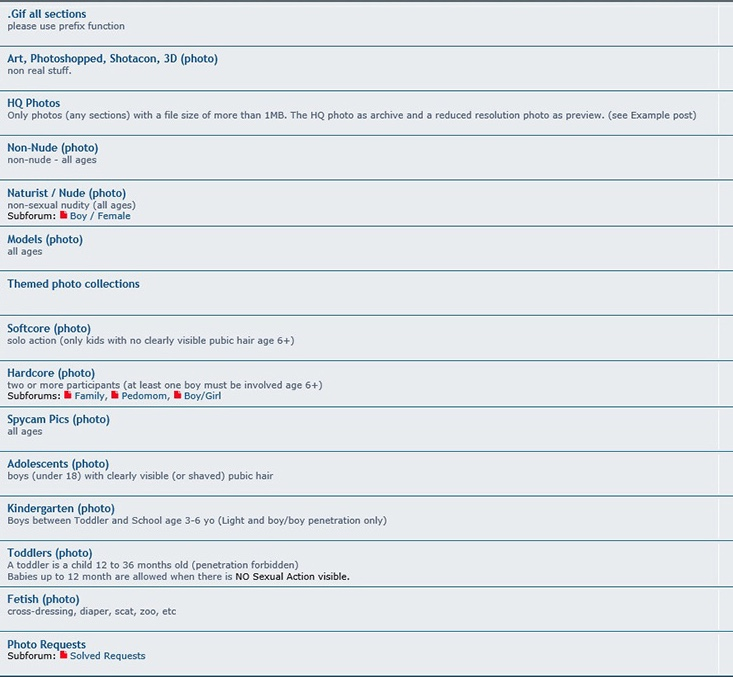
Examples of categories on Boystown

The site was launched in June 2019 and was run through the Tor network. The server was registered in Moldova. As of May 2021, the website was considered one of the largest international darknet platforms to host child pornography and had 400,000 registered users.

=== Website content ===
The website featured various forums and chats for communication. The illegal images and videos were posted on the forums and the chats where members were able to communicate with one another. All of the content was behind a registration process. There were two chat services provided, one called "Lolipub" and the other known as "BOYSPUB". The website mainly contained sexual abuse material involving young boys. The child pornographic content had various categories including "Art" (which included shotacon among other subcategories), "hardcore", "Adolescents", "kindergarten", and "toddler". Lolipub also had rules that included banning the promotion of hurtcore. Each section had their restrictions. For instance, the "Adolescents" section should contain boys under 18 years old with visible (or shaved) pubic hair while the "Softcore" section was dedicated for the boys without pubic hair which meant that the content should explicitly show the genitals of the young boys. Non-nude section was dedicated to boys who cover their genitals.

== Investigation ==
The website was investigated by a German police task force with cooperation from Europol and international law enforcement agencies. The platform's administrators and users were under investigation for months. Early on, the German Federal Criminal Police (BKA) was able to plant an undercover agent inside the Boystown network, but identifying the perpetrators proved difficult as they only communicated via the Tor network.

To identify the perpetrators, police used a correlation analysis attack against the Ricochet chat protocol which was used by Boystown admins and operates on the Tor network. By sending Ricochet messages to perpetrators and monitoring several hundred Tor nodes for simultaneous traffic of the correct size, authorities were able to piece together the chain of Tor nodes used and the perpetrator's entry node, which then revealed the perpetrators' IP addresses.

=== Agencies involved in the investigation ===
The following agencies took part in the investigation:

- Australia: Australian Centre to Counter Child Exploitation (ACCCE), Australian Federal Police (AFP), Queensland Police Service (QPS)
- Canada: Royal Canadian Mounted Police
- Germany: Federal Criminal Police (Bundeskriminalamt)
- The Netherlands: National Police (Politie)
- United States: Federal Bureau of Investigation (FBI), U.S. Immigration and Customs Enforcement (ICE)

=== Website shutdown ===
In mid-April 2021, the website was raided by authorities and shut down.

=== Suspects, trial, convictions ===
Three primary suspects were discovered and identified during the investigation: a 40-year-old man from Paderborn, a 49-year-old man from Munich, and a 58-year-old man from Northern Germany who was living in Paraguay. The suspects allegedly acted as administrators for the website and gave advice to its users on how to evade law enforcement while using the platform. Another suspect was a 64-year-old man from Hamburg who was accused of being one of the most active users, uploading over 3,500 posts.

The public and the press were excluded from the trial. The suspects confessed. The man from Munich was sentenced to 12 years in prison with subsequent preventive detention ("Sicherungsverwahrung"), the man from Paderborn received a sentence of 10.5 years with subsequent preventive detention, the German from Paraguay was sentenced to 8 years in prison and the man from Hamburg received a sentence of 7 years in prison.

According to the suspects, one inner-circle member of Boystown claimed to be a high-ranking employee of a German security agency who as part of his job received requests from the German government and other authorities to check the security of certain processes. He acted as an administrator for Boystown and optimized various programming scripts.

== Aftermath ==
Hours after the shutdown, an unknown user posted a dump of Boystown online, as confirmed by the Frankfurt prosecutor's office. The journalist group STRG_F had 13.5 TB of data deleted from various file hosters by December 2021, pointing out that investigators were only interested in hard drives of perpetrators but not in removing offending material from the internet.

Three successor platforms (with 410 and 846 thousand accounts) with, among others, a common admin in Germany (a 21-year-old from Saxony) were shut down Christmas 2022. Another three suspected administrators were arrested in November and December in Seelze near Hanover, Schleswig-Holstein and Brazil. The BKA secured hundreds of thousands of images.
