= Lazarus (software) =

Free cross-platform integrated development environment for Free Pascal

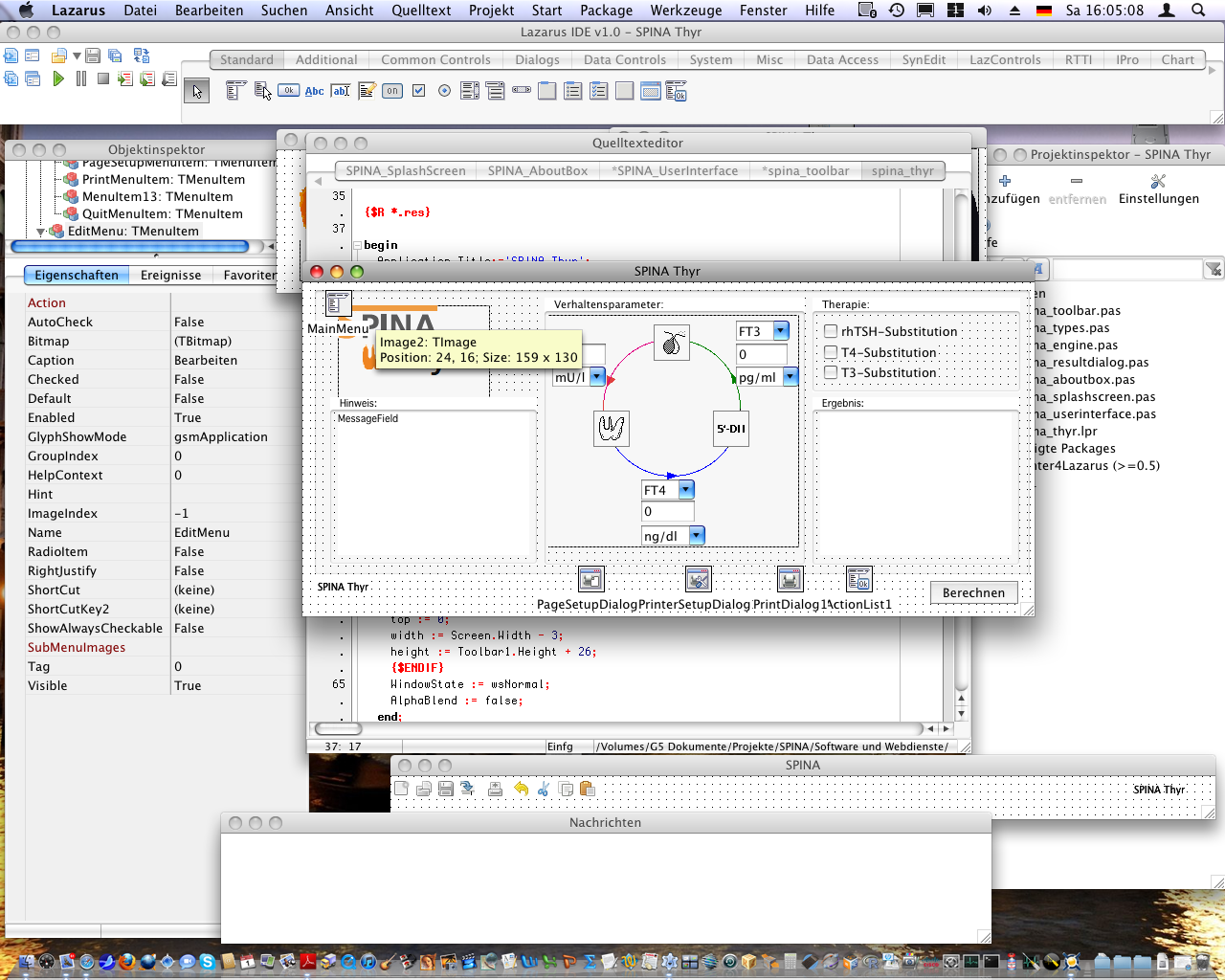
- Lazarus IDE 1.0 running on macOS
- Developers: Lazarus and Free Pascal Team (volunteers)
- Stable release: 4.6.0 / 25 February 2026; 6 months ago
- Written in: Object Pascal
- Operating system: cross-platform: Windows, macOS, Linux
- Platform: IA-32, x86-64, ARM (Raspberry Pi)
- Available in: 14 languages
- List of languages Chinese (simplified), Dutch, English, Finnish, French, German, Indonesian, Italian, Japanese, Polish, Portuguese (Brazilian), Russian, Spanish, Ukrainian
- Type: Integrated development environment
- License: GNU General Public License and modified GNU Lesser General Public License (with static linking exception)
- Website: www.lazarus-ide.org
- Repository: gitlab.com/freepascal.org/lazarus

Lazarus is a cross-platform, integrated development environment (IDE) for rapid application development (RAD) using the Free Pascal compiler. Its goal is to provide an easy-to-use development environment for developing with the Object Pascal language, which is as close as possible to Delphi. It is free and open-source software with different parts released under different software licenses.

Lazarus is often used to create native-code console and graphical user interface (GUI) applications for desktop computers, mobile devices, web applications, web services, visual components, and function libraries for several different operating system platforms, including macOS, Linux, and Windows.

A project created by using Lazarus on one platform can be compiled on any other one which Free Pascal compiler supports. For desktop applications, one source code can target macOS, Linux, and Windows, with little or no modification. For example, the Lazarus IDE is created from one code base and available on all major platforms including Raspberry Pi.

== History ==
Lazarus was started in February 1999 by three developers, Cliff Baeseman, Shane Miller, and Michael A. Hess, who had previously attempted to contribute to the Megido project, an earlier open source effort to build a Delphi like IDE for Free Pascal that dissolved due to internal disagreements and architectural issues. In frustration, they founded Lazarus as an independent project to accomplish the same goal. The project was hosted on SourceForge and attracted community contributors through mailing lists and version control systems. Marc Weustink joined in August 1999 and made foundational contributions to the debugger and core components. Mattias Gaertner joined in September 2000 and has been one of the principal contributors to the IDE's core since then. The original founders are no longer involved with the project.

== Features ==
Lazarus provides a What You See Is What You Get (WYSIWYG) development environment for creating rich user interfaces, application logic, and other supporting code artifacts, similar to Delphi. Along with project management features, the Lazarus IDE also provides:

- A visual windows layout designer
- GUI widgets or visual components such as edit boxes, buttons, dialogs, menus, etc.
- Non-visual components for common behaviors such as persistence of application settings
- Data-connectivity components for MySQL, PostgreSQL, FireBird, Oracle, SQLite, Sybase, and others
- Data-aware widget set that allows the developer to see data in visual components in the designer to assist with development
- Interactive debugger
- Code completion
- Code templates
- Syntax highlighting
- Context-sensitive help
- Text resource manager for internationalization
- Automatic code formatting
- Extensibility via custom components

== Cross-platform development ==
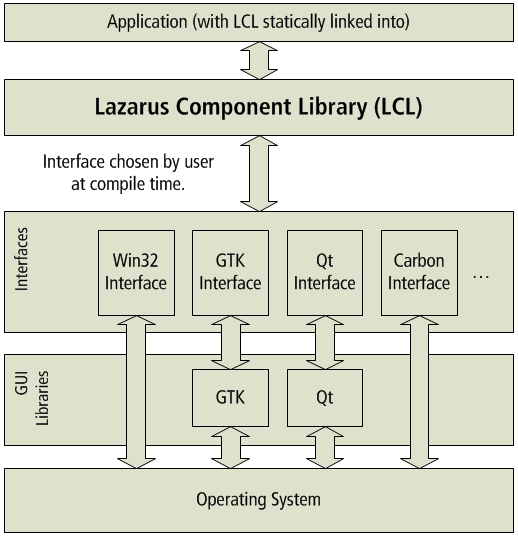
Architecture of the Lazarus Component Library

Interaction of class libraries and widgetsets in Lazarus and Free Pascal

Lazarus uses Free Pascal as its back-end compiler. As Free Pascal supports cross-compiling, Lazarus applications can be cross-compiled from Windows, Linux, or macOS to any of the supported Free Pascal compilation targets. Applications for embedded devices (smartphones, PDAs, routers, game consoles) can be cross-compiled from any desktop platform.

Lazarus provides a cross-platform application framework called the Lazarus Component Library (LCL), which provides a single, unified interface for programmers, with different platform-specific implementations. Using LCL, it is possible to create applications in a write once, compile anywhere manner, unless system-dependent features are used explicitly. LCL was originally modeled after the Visual Component Library (VCL) in Delphi 6, but is not restricted to Windows. This is done by separating the definition of common widget classes and their widgetset-specific implementation. Each widget set is supported by providing an interface which interacts directly with the set.

== Database development ==
Developers can install packages that allow Lazarus to support several database management systems (DBMSes). Programs can interact with a DBMS through code or by components dropped on a form.

The following DBMSes are supported out of the box:

- dBase and FoxPro,
- InterBase and Firebird
- Microsoft SQL Server and Sybase ASE
- MySQL and MariaDB
- Open Database Connectivity (ODBC) databases
- Oracle Database
- PostgreSQL
- SQLite

== Differences from Delphi ==
Lazarus resembles Delphi in many ways. It supports Component Object Model (COM) since version 2.2.0, and offers most of Delphi's networking functions. However, there are limits to the performance and feature set.

Lazarus does not support the following, which Delphi does:

- Datasnap (uses Embarcadero proprietary enterprise functions, not a publicly documented system)
- Dynamically loadable packages
- .NET libraries (.NET code, however, can invoke Object Pascal code or anything other machine-native library via Platform Invocation Services.)
- Extensive Microsoft Office connectivity (Lazarus can only open Microsoft Excel with a simple table filled out.)

LCL is not fully compatible with VCL. This makes the extensive repository of available VCL widgets inaccessible without conversion. The conversion effort mostly involves some editing, although there are a few fundamental differences. When porting, missing units in the libraries are a considerably bigger problem than incompatibilities between LCL and VCL. Components for Delphi can be converted to work in Lazarus. This can be complex, though less so than for Lazarus versions older than 0.9.30, based on FP 2.4.x.

On Windows, the default size of an executable file is larger than the Delphi 6 or 7 equivalent, as Lazarus stores debug information within the executable, rather than as separate files. Starting with version 0.9.30, Lazarus supports external debug symbols via compiler options. Thus, program file sizes can be significantly reduced. Alternatively, debug info can be stripped from EXEs (e.g. using a port of the UNIX strip command).

== Distribution and licensing ==
Like Free Pascal, Lazarus is free software. Different portions are distributed under different free software licenses, including GPL, LGPL, MPL, and a modified version of LGPL. LCL, which is statically built into the produced executables, is licensed under a modified version of the LGPL, granting extra permissions to allow it to be statically built into the produced software, including proprietary ones.

Installing a design time package is equivalent to linking to the IDE, so that distributing the Lazarus IDE with a GPL-incompatible design-time package such as the JEDI packages licensed under the Mozilla Public License, pre-installed would cause a license violation. This does not prohibit proprietary packages from being developed with Lazarus.

== History ==
The first attempt to develop an IDE for Free Pascal dates back to 1998, under the "Megido" project. After the project failed, some of its developers started a new project based on a more flexible foundation. The name "Lazarus" alludes to the revival of the Megido concept. It is inspired by Lazarus of Bethany, who, according to the Gospel of John, was restored to life by Jesus four days after his death.

The first preliminary LCL version was ready for release in 2001. In 2003, the first beta version of Lazarus (0.9.0.3) was hosted at SourceForge. Lazarus version 1.0 was released in 2012. A significantly enhanced Lazarus 1.2 with was released in 2014. More than four million downloads had been made from SourceForge as of March 2014.

== Versions ==
Unsupported
Supported
Latest version
Preview version
Future version

Version number	Release date	Platform	Comments
0.0.5	January 2001	Windows	First release of component library
0.1	January 2001	Windows	Redesign of component library to support platform-sensitive development for Linux and Windows using GTK+ and other widgetsets
0.5	January 30, 2001	Windows, Linux	Bug fixes and new features supporting cross-platform development and project skeletons
0.8	October 9, 2001	Windows, Linux	Codetools implemented, bug fixes
0.8.2	January 17, 2002	Windows, Linux	Expanded find functions
0.8.4	August 19, 2002	Windows, Linux	Improved graphics and font support, support for Delphi 6 syntax. Binary DFMs are now automatically converted to LFMs
0.8.5	October 26, 2002	Windows, Linux	LCL decoupled from interfaces
0.9.0.3	September 4, 2003	Linux	First release on SourceForge
0.9.1	February 27, 2004	Windows, Linux	Support for packages, numerous added and enhanced properties
0.9.4	January 3, 2005	Windows	Threading support improved, oldest public version hosted at SourceForge
0.9.6	February 25, 2005	Windows	
0.9.8	July 19, 2005	Windows	
0.9.10	October 3, 2005	Windows, Mac OS X (PPC)	Bug fixes, extensibility of IDE improved, document editor for FPDoc files; includes Free Pascal 2.0.1
0.9.12	February 7, 2006	Windows	New packages for database support, CGI applications and printing
0.9.14	April 2, 2006	Windows, Mac OS X (PPC), Linux	Bugfixes, more controls in WinCE and Qt4 interface
0.9.16	May 28, 2006	Windows, Mac OS X (PPC), Linux	Bug fixes, online help for IDE windows and for LCL applications, improvements to Qt widgetset interface; includes Free Pascal 2.0.2
0.9.18	September 23, 2006	Windows, Mac OS X (PPC), Linux	Bugfixes, procedure list implemented, new command-line tool "lazbuild"
0.9.20	November 5, 2006	Windows, Mac OS X (PPC), Linux	Bufixes, code folding implemented, Qt widgetset improved
0.9.22	March 26, 2007	Windows, Mac OS X (PPC), Linux	New components to write Windows services and Linux daemons, support for custom mouse cursors; includes Free Pascal 2.0.4
0.9.24	November 15, 2007	Windows, Mac OS X, Linux	First stable release for Win64, WinCE, and Intel-based Mac OS X. Improvements in Qt, Carbon, and Gtk2 widgetset interfaces. Customizable toolbar; includes Free Pascal 2.2.0
0.9.26	October 5, 2008	Windows, Mac OS X, Linux	Internal graphic system was rewritten. LCL now uses Unicode strings encoded as UTF-8 on all platforms. FPDoc help in tooltips. First version to run natively using the Carbon widgetset on Mac OS X
0.9.26.2	March 13, 2009	Windows, Mac OS X, Linux	Bug fixes, improved icon support; includes Free Pascal 2.2.2
0.9.28	September 29, 2009	Windows, Mac OS X, Linux	Improvements of editor and debugger including support for double-byte fonts such as Eastern, Japanese, Chinese, and Arabic, smaller file sizes of generated applications; includes Free Pascal 2.2.4
0.9.28.2	October 25, 2009	Windows, Mac OS X, Linux	Mainly bug fixes
0.9.30	March 22, 2011	Windows, Mac OS X, Linux	Large number of new features, including docking and multiple source-code windows. Based on Free Pascal 2.4.2
0.9.30.2RC1	September 30, 2011	Windows, Mac OS X, Linux	Includes Free Pascal 2.4.4. Release candidate for Lazarus 0.9.30.2
0.9.30.2RC2	October 26, 2011	Windows, Mac OS X, Linux	Release candidate for Lazarus 0.9.30.2
0.9.30.2	November 5, 2011	Windows, Mac OS X, Linux	Bug fixes
0.9.30.4RC1	March 3, 2012	Windows, Mac OS X, Linux	Bug fixes, includes Free Pascal 2.6.0. Release candidate for Lazarus 0.9.30.4
0.9.30.4RC2	March 7, 2012	Windows, Mac OS X, Linux	Release candidate for Lazarus 0.9.30.4
0.9.30.4RC3	March 11, 2012	Windows, Mac OS X, Linux	Release candidate for Lazarus 0.9.30.4
0.9.30.4	March 14, 2012	Windows, Mac OS X, Linux	Bug fixes
1.0RC1	July 29, 2012	Windows, Mac OS X (Intel), Linux	Release candidate for Lazarus 1.0
1.0RC2	August 21, 2012	Windows, Mac OS X, Linux	Release candidate for Lazarus 1.0
1.0	August 28, 2012	Windows, Mac OS X, Linux	First final version. This stable release includes Free Pascal 2.6.0. Multiple corrections and improvements of the IDE, including a macro function, expanded code-folding and new debugger functions
1.0.2	October 10, 2012	Windows, Mac OS X, Linux	Bug fixes, minor additions to LCL and widgetsets
1.0.4	December 2, 2012	Windows, Mac OS X, Linux	Bug fixes, minor additions to IDE, LCL and widgetsets as well as LazReport and TAChart
1.0.6	February 3, 2013	Windows, Mac OS X, Linux	Bug fixes, minor additions to IDE, LCL and widgetsets as well as LazReport and TAChart
1.0.8	March 19, 2013	Windows, Mac OS X, Linux	Bug fix release; includes Free Pascal 2.6.2
1.0.10	June 12, 2013	Windows, Mac OS X, Linux	Bug fixes
1.0.12	August 24, 2013	Windows, Mac OS X, Linux	Bug fixes
1.0.14	November 16, 2013	Windows, Mac OS X, Linux	Bug fixes
1.1.99	September 16, 2013	Windows, Mac OS X, Linux	Alpha version for Lazarus 1.2
1.2RC1	November 3, 2013	Windows, Mac OS X, Linux	Release candidate for Lazarus 1.2
1.2RC2	January 13, 2014	Windows, Mac OS X, Linux	Release candidate for Lazarus 1.2
1.2	March 4, 2014	Windows, Mac OS X, Linux	Multiple new features, including a macro recorder, support for layered graphs and Pascal Script. Based on Free Pascal 2.6.2
1.2.2	April 23, 2014	Windows, Mac OS X, BSD, Solaris, Linux	Bug fix release. Based on Free Pascal 2.6.4
1.2.4	June 16, 2014	Windows, Mac OS X, BSD, Solaris, Linux	Bug fix release
1.2.6	October 12, 2014	Windows, Mac OS X, BSD, Solaris, Linux	Bug fix release
1.4.0	April 19, 2015	Windows, Mac OS X, BSD, Solaris, Linux	Improvements of editor, resource handling and additional new features. Based on Free Pascal 2.6.4
1.4.2	July 14, 2015	Windows, Mac OS X, BSD, Solaris, Linux	Bug fix release
1.4.4	October 4, 2015	Windows, Mac OS X, BSD, Solaris, Linux	Bug fix release
1.6	February 18, 2016	Windows, Mac OS X, Linux	Multiple new features, including docking, project groups and improved editor. Based on Free Pascal 3.0.0.
1.6.2	November 13, 2016	Windows, Mac OS X, Linux	Bug fix release
1.6.4	February 26, 2017	Windows, macOS, Linux	Bug fix release. Based on Free Pascal 3.0.2
1.8.0	December 6, 2017	Windows, macOS, BSD, Linux	Major release with many new features including an online package manager. Based on Free Pascal 3.0.4
1.8.2	February 28, 2018.		Bug fix release
1.8.4	May 22, 2018	Windows, macOS, BSD, Linux	Bug fix release.
2.0.0	January 5, 2019	Windows, macOS, BSD, Linux	Multiple new features including Cocoa support and the introduction of a Pascal to JavaScript transpiler
2.0.2	April 16, 2019	Windows, macOS, BSD, Linux	Bug fix release
2.0.4	August 6, 2019	Windows, macOS, BSD, Linux	Bug fix release
2.0.6	November 1, 2019	Windows, macOS, BSD, Linux	Bug fix release
2.0.8	April 16, 2020	Windows, macOS, BSD, Linux	Bug fix release, improved Cocoa widgetset
2.0.10	July 11, 2020	Windows, macOS, BSD, Linux	Bug fix release, minor additions, first version based on Free Pascal 3.2.0
2.0.12	February 21, 2021	Windows, macOS, BSD, Linux	Based on Free Pascal 3.2.0. List of fixes available.
2.2.0	January 5, 2022	Windows, macOS, BSD, Linux	Based on Free Pascal 3.2.2. Multiple improvements, among others in the IDE, the LCL and widgetsets.
2.2.2	May 19, 2022	Windows, macOS, BSD, Linux	Bug fix release
2.2.4	September 28, 2022	Windows, macOS, BSD, Linux	Bug fix release
2.2.6	March 6, 2023	Windows, macOS, BSD, Linux	Bug fix release
3.0	December 21, 2023	Windows, macOS, BSD, Linux	Multiple improvements, among others in the IDE, the LCL, widgetsets and the debugger.
3.2	February 28, 2024	Windows, macOS, BSD, Linux	Bug fixes and minor improvements.
3.4	May 29, 2024	Windows, macOS, BSD, Linux	Bug fixes and minor improvements.
3.6	September 30, 2024	Windows, macOS, BSD, Linux	Bug fixes and minor improvements.
3.8	January 22, 2025	Windows, macOS, BSD, Linux	Bug fixes and minor improvements.
4.0	May 5, 2025	Windows, macOS, BSD, Linux	New event types, extended support for Cocoa, optional docking support, more debugger options and extended components.
4.2	July 22, 2025	Windows, macOS, BSD, Linux	Bug fixes.
4.4	November 10, 2025	Windows, macOS, BSD, Linux	Bug fixes and additions to the Cocoa widgetset.
4.6	February 25, 2026	Windows, macOS, BSD, Linux	Bug fixes and extended translations.

== Examples of applications produced with Lazarus ==
- ASuite is a free open-source application launcher for Windows. From 2.1 Alpha 1, it's fully written in Lazarus/FPC.
- Beyond Compare is a data comparison utility for Windows, macOS, and Linux. The macOS and Linux versions are compiled using Lazarus/FPC.
- Cartes du Ciel is a free planetarium program for Linux, macOS and Windows. The software maps out and labels most of the constellations, planets, and objects you can see with a telescope. It is fully written in Lazarus/FPC and released under GPL.
- C-evo is an open source turn-based strategy game that has been ported from Delphi to Lazarus.
- Cheat Engine is a memory scanner/hex editor/debugger. It is useful for cheating in computer games. Since version 6.0 it is compiled with Lazarus/FPC.
- EPANET, a software package for modelling water-distribution systems.
- HNSKY, Hallo Northern Sky is a free planetarium program for Windows and Linux. Since version 3.4.0 written and compiled with Lazarus/FPC.
- MyNotex is a free software for Linux useful to take and manage textual notes.
- PeaZip is an open-source archiver, made with Lazarus/FPC.
- TorChat, inactive, was moving away from Python and is being rewritten in Lazarus + Free Pascal.
- Total Commander 64-bit version.
- Double Commander is a cross-platform open-source file manager with two panels side by side. It is inspired by Total Commander, plus some new ideas.
- SimThyr is a continuous simulation program for thyroid homeostasis.

== Examples of Delphi libraries compatible with Lazarus ==
- GLScene is a free OpenGL-based library that provides visual components and objects allowing description and rendering of 3D scenes.
- OpenWire is an open-source library that allows pin type properties to make connections between LCL components similar to LabVIEW or Agilent VEE.

== See also ==
- Comparison of integrated development environments#Pascal, Object Pascal
- Dev-Pascal
- Delphi (software)
- Free Pascal Compiler
- Object Pascal
