= Girls Town =

Girls Town may refer to:

- Girls' Town, 1942 American film
- Girls Town (1959 film), American film
- Girls Town (1996 film), American film
