= Py2exe =

py2exe
- Original author: Thomas Heller
- Developer: Community
- Initial release: 24 January 2001; 24 years ago
- Stable release: 0.13.0.0 / 5 November 2022; 3 years ago
- Repository: github.com/py2exe/py2exe
- Written in: Python, C
- Platform: Microsoft Windows
- Type: Packaging tool
- License: MIT
- Website: www.py2exe.org

py2exe is a Python extension which converts Python scripts (.py) into Microsoft Windows executables (.exe). These executables can run on a system without Python installed. It is the most common tool for doing so.

py2exe was used to distribute the official BitTorrent client (before the version 6.0) and is still used to distribute SpamBayes as well as other projects.

Since May 2014, version 0.9.2.0 of py2exe is available for Python 3. Before then, py2exe was made only for Python 2, and it was necessary to use an alternative like cx_Freeze for Python 3 code.

Although this program transforms a .py file to an .exe, it does not make it run faster because py2exe bundles the Python bytecode without converting it to machine-code. It may even run slower than using the Python interpreter directly because of startup overhead.
