= Manila Boys' Town Complex =

Residential care center in the Philippines

Institution overview
- Formed: March 3, 1947
- Jurisdiction: City of Manila
- Headquarters: Marikina, Metro Manila; 14°39′58.0″N 121°07′07.2″E
- Parent department: Department of Social Welfare and Development (DSWD)
- Parent city office: Manila DSWD

The Manila Boys' Town Complex is a residential care center for indigent boys, girls and the elderly in Marikina, Metro Manila, Philippines and is operated by the Manila local government.

== Background ==
Manila Boys' Town was founded on March 3, 1947. As the name suggest, it initially started as a residential care center for Manila's indigent male children from eight to sixteen years old. The complex eventually expanded to include Girls Home as the original facility's female counterpart but for girls as young as three, a Home for the Aged for 60 years old and above, and a Foundling Home for male children from three to seven years old.

Despite being in Marikina, the facility is under the jurisdiction of the City of Manila, specifically through the Manila Department of Social Welfare and Development (MDSWD).

== Facilities ==
The following are the centers within the Manila Boys' Town and the number of wards as of August 26, 2022.

- Kids' Home – 28
- Girls' Home – 103
- Boys' Home – 142
- Luwalhati Ng Maynila Home for the Aged – 389 (189 male and 200 female)
- RAC-KAMADA (homeless and street dwellers) – 524
