= Lazarus Component Library =

Visual software component library

Interaction of class libraries and widgetsets in Lazarus and Free Pascal

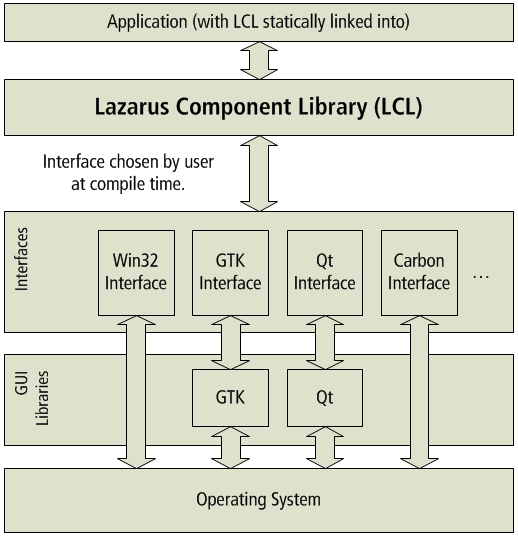
Architecture of the Lazarus Component Library

The Lazarus Component Library, abbreviated LCL, is a visual software component library for the Lazarus IDE.

== Description ==
The LCL consists of a collection of units that provide components and classes especially for visual tasks. It is based on the Free Pascal libraries RTL and FCL. By binding platform-specific widgetsets it supports platform-sensitive software development for several operating systems including Android, Desktop Linux, Mac OS X and Windows. Lazarus source code files is under a mix of licenses: GNU General Public License, version 2 (GPLv2), a modified LGPL, and the MPL.

LCL supports GTK2, Qt4, Qt5, Qt6, fpGUI for BSD, Linux, macOS and Windows, Win32 for Windows, Cocoa for macOS, as well as MUI for Amiga systems and more.

== See also ==
- Widgetset
