= Kongad =

Kongad may refer to:

Kongad is a town and state assembly constituency in Palakkad district, state of Kerala, India. It is a local government organisation that serves the villages of Kongad-I and Kongad-II.

- Kongad-I, a village in Palakkad district, Kerala, India
- Kongad-II, a village in Palakkad district, Kerala, India
- Kongad (gram panchayat), a gram panchayat that serves the above villages
- Kongad (State Assembly constituency)
