= Agency for New and Renewable Energy Research and Technology =

Indian government agency

Agency for New and renewable Energy Research & Technology
- ANERT logo

Agency overview
- Formed: 1986
- Jurisdiction: Kerala, India
- Headquarters: Thiruvananthapuram
- Minister responsible: Sunny Joseph, Minister for Electricity
- Agency executive: Harshil R Meena IAS, Chief executive officer
- Parent department: Power Department, Government of Kerala
- Website: anert.gov.in

The Agency for New and Renewable Energy Research and Technology (ANERT) (earlier known as the Agency for Non-conventional Energy & Rural Technology) is a government agency based in Kerala, India. Its mission is gathering and disseminating knowledge about renewable energy, energy conservation, and rural technology. The agency was established in 1986 with its headquarters at Thiruvananthapuram.

== About ==
ANERT is an autonomous organisation which was initially established under the Science, Technology & Environment Council (STEC), of the Government of Kerala. It is the primary agency handling renewable energy programmes in Kerala and carrying out topical programs in Kerala for the Ministry of New and Renewable Energy (MNRE), a bureau of the Government of India. The body was registered under the Charitable Societies Act by the government of Kerala, and now functions under the state's Power Department.

== Administration ==
=== Governing body ===
ANERT is administered by a governing body chaired by the state Minister for Electricity, with highest oversight by a director appointed by the Government. This board provides direction for activities in various energy-related areas.

=== Executive committee ===
ANERT has also an executive committee chaired by the Secretary to the Government of Kerala, Power Department. Other members are the Secretary to Government for the Finance (Expenditure) Department, Government of Kerala, the chairman of the Kerala State Electricity Board, the member secretary of the Kerala State Council for Science, Technology and Environment, and two additional members nominated by the state government.

== Programmes ==
Major programmes that are implemented by ANERT are:

=== Solar Photovoltaic Programme (SPV) ===
Under this programme, ANERT distributes devices which use solar energy. These include solar lanterns, home lighting systems, street light systems, TV power packs, and vaccine refrigerators. These devices are distributed in accordance with MNRE and other programmes using ANERT funds.

=== Solar Thermal Energy Programme ===
The Solar Thermal Energy Programme aims to supplement thermal energy requirements at various temperatures for different applications; they include cooking, water heating, heating for industrial processes, crop drying, space heating, and water desalination. Programme processes include harnessing solar energy from the Sun and converting it into heat energy using various solar thermal devices and systems.

=== Wind Energy Programme ===
ANERT is in the process of increasing wind power usage at different locations within the state. In association with MNRE, the agency has conducted a detailed study of the wind potential in Kerala. Its largest capacity wind farm is located at Kanjikode, in Palakkad District; it has a capacity of 22 MW

=== Bio-Energy Programme ===
This program aims to recover energy from waste; study the scientific disposal of waste; convert waste into fertilizer after energy extraction; improve sanitation; protect the environment; and generate relevant employment opportunities. Domestic and industrial biowaste is of major import to the agency, as it can be converted into producer gas via gasification. This gas can be used for heating and generating electricity.

=== National Programme on Improved Chulha ===
In 2001, as part of its declared "Women's Empowerment Year", MNRE decided to make 10,000 villages throughout India "smoke free" by the promotion of improved chulhas, or cooking stoves.

== Training and Workshops ==
ANERT provides training and workshops for field level staffs to improve services.

== Policies ==
=== Kerala Renewable Energy Policy 2002 ===
The Kerala Renewable Energy Policy was introduced in April 2002 to develop, propagate, and promote non-conventional energy sources, as well as to exploit natural resources for cheaper power projects.

=== Wind Energy Policy 2004 ===
The Wind Energy Policy was instituted to set up wind farms on private lands in Kerala.

=== Kerala Solar Energy Policy 2013 ===
In November 2013 the Solar Energy Policy was implemented to increase the use of solar energy appliances in Kerala.
