= Kongad Assembly constituency =

Constituency of the Kerala legislative assembly in India

Kongad
- Constituency No. 53 for the Kerala Legislative Assembly
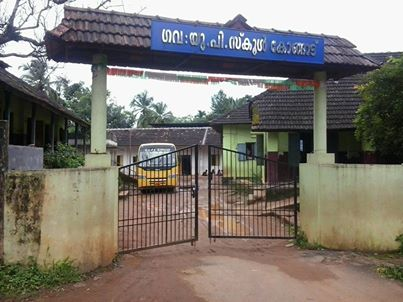
- A school in Kongad Assembly constituency

Constituency details
- Country: India
- Region: South India
- State: Kerala
- District: Palakkad
- Lok Sabha constituency: Palakkad
- Established: 2008
- Reservation: SC

Member of Legislative Assembly
- 16th Kerala Legislative Assembly
- Incumbent K. A. Thulasi
- Party: INC
- Elected year: 2026

Kongad is one of the 140 state legislative assembly constituencies in Kerala in southern India. It is also one of the seven state legislative assembly constituencies included in Palakkad Lok Sabha constituency. K.A Thulasi of INC has been the current MLA since the 2026 Kerala Legislative Assembly election.

== Local self-governed segments ==
Kongad Assembly constituency is composed of the following local self-governed segments:

Sl no.	Name	Status (Grama panchayat/Municipality)	Taluk
1	Keralassery	Grama panchayat	Palakkad
2	Kongad	Grama panchayat	Palakkad
3	Mankara	Grama panchayat	Palakkad
4	Mannur	Grama panchayat	Palakkad
5	Parali	Grama panchayat	Palakkad
6	Kanjirappuzha	Grama panchayat	Mannarkkad
7	Karimba	Grama panchayat	Mannarkkad
8	Karakurissi	Grama panchayat	Mannarkkad
9	Tachampara	Grama panchayat	Mannarkkad

== Members of the Legislative Assembly ==
The following list contains all members of Kerala Legislative Assembly who have represented Kongad Assembly constituency during the period of various assemblies:

Election	Member	Party
2011	K. V. Vijayadas	CPI(M)
2016	K. V. Vijayadas	CPI(M)
2021	K. Shanthakumari	CPI(M)
2026	K. A. Thulasi	Indian National Congress

== Election results ==
Percentage change (±%) denotes the change in the number of votes from the immediate previous election.

=== 2026 ===
2026 Kerala Legislative Assembly election: Kongad
Party	Candidate	Votes	%	±%
INC	K. A. Thulasi	62,734	42.20	▲12.84
CPI(M)	K. Santhakumari	59,028	39.71	▼9.30
BJP	Renu Suresh	24,925	16.77	▼3.20
BSP	Guruvayoorappan P. E.	859	0.58	▼0.01
NOTA	None of the above	1,109	0.75	▲0.06
Margin of victory		3,706	2.49	▼17.16
Turnout		1,48,655		
INC gain from CPI(M)		Swing	▲12.84	

=== 2021 ===
There were 1,81,172 registered voters in the constituency for the 2021 election.

2021 Kerala Legislative Assembly election: Kongad
Party	Candidate	Votes	%	±%
CPI(M)	K. Santhakumari	67,881	49.01	▲3.66
IUML	U. C. Raman	40,662	29.36	−
BJP	M. Suresh Babu	27,661	19.97	▲2.22
BSP	P. E. Guruvayoorappan	1,351	0.59	▲0.39
NOTA	None of the above	953	0.69	
Margin of victory		27,219	19.65	▲9.75
Turnout		1,38,508	76.45	▼0.69
CPI(M) hold		Swing	▲3.66	

=== 2016 ===
There were 1,73,779 registered voters in the constituency for the 2016 election.

2016 Kerala Legislative Assembly election: Kongad
Party	Candidate	Votes	%	±%
CPI(M)	K. V. Vijayadas	60,790	45.35	▲1.28
INC	Pandalam Sudhakaran	47,519	35.45	▼8.04
BJP	Renu Suresh	23,800	17.75	▲10.29
NOTA	None of the above	1,163	0.87	
BSP	Ramesh P. V. Kannampariyam	789	0.59	▼0.47
Margin of victory		13,271	9.90	▲6.76
Turnout		1,34,061	77.14	▲4.30
CPI(M) hold		Swing	▲1.28	

=== 2011 ===
There were 1,55,799 registered voters in the constituency for the 2011 election.

2011 Kerala Legislative Assembly election: Kongad
Party	Candidate	Votes	%	±%
CPI(M)	K. V. Vijayadas	52,920	46.49	
INC	P. Swaminathan	49,355	43.49	
BJP	V. Devayani	8,467	7.46	
Independent	Vijayadasan	1,543	1.36	−
BSP	K. Velayudhan	1,198	1.06	
Margin of victory		3,565	3.14	
Turnout		1,13,483	72.84	
CPI(M) win (new seat)				

== See also ==
- Kongad
- Palakkad district
- List of constituencies of the Kerala Legislative Assembly
- 2016 Kerala Legislative Assembly election
