= O. R. Kelu =

Indian politician

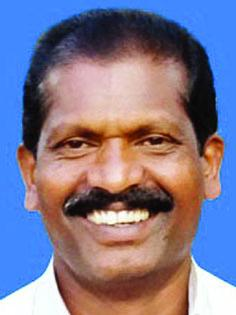

Minister for Welfare of Scheduled Castes, Scheduled Tribes and Backward Classes, Government of Kerala
- In office 23 June 2024 – 23 May 2026
- Chief MInister: Pinarayi Vijayan
- Departments: Scheduled Caste and Scheduled Tribes Development; Backward Communities Development
- Preceded by: K. Radhakrishnan
- Succeeded by: K. A. Thulasi

Member of the Kerala Legislative Assembly
- In office 2 June 2016 – 23 May 2026
- Preceded by: P. K. Jayalakshmi
- Succeeded by: Usha Vijayan
- Constituency: Mananthavady

Personal details
- Born: 2 August 1970 (age 56) Wayanad, Kerala, India
- Party: Communist Party of India (Marxist)
- Spouse: Santha P. K.
- Children: 2

O. Raman Kelu (born 2 August 1970) is an Indian politician who served as the Minister for the Welfare of Scheduled Castes, Scheduled Tribes and Backward Classes in the Second Pinarayi Vijayan government. He served as the MLA from Mananthavady, Wayanad, Kerala, for two terms until 2026.

== Personal life ==
Son of Raman and Ammu, he was born at Wayanad on 2 August 1970. Kelu is from Kurichiya tribe. Kelu is a farmer by profession. He is married to Santha P. K. and has two daughters. He is a SSLC dropout. He was once a daily wage worker.

== Political career ==
He served as a member of the Thirunelly Grama Panchayat for five years and later as its President for ten years. He was also a member of the Mananthavady Block Panchayat for two years. He was inducted into the Council of Ministers in the second Pinarayi Vijayan ministry after K. Radhakrishnan resigned, and was appointed as the Minister for Welfare of Scheduled Castes, Scheduled Tribes and Backward Classes. He was elected to the 18th Lok Sabha from Alathur. He was the first CPI(M) minister from Wayanad.

Kerala Legislative Assembly Election
Year	Constituency	Closest Rival	Majority (Votes)	Won/Lost
2016	Mananthavady	P. K. Jayalakshmi (INC)	1,307	Won
2021	Mananthavady	P. K. Jayalakshmi (INC)	9,282	Won
2026	Mananthavady	Usha Vijayan (INC)	10,543	Lost
