= Mananthavady Assembly constituency =

Constituency of the Kerala legislative assembly in India

Mananthavady
- Constituency No. 17 for the Kerala Legislative Assembly

Constituency details
- Country: India
- Region: South India
- State: Kerala
- District: Wayanad district
- Lok Sabha constituency: Wayanad
- Established: 2008
- Total electors: 1,95,048 (2021)
- Reservation: ST

Member of Legislative Assembly
- 16th Kerala Legislative Assembly
- Incumbent Usha Vijayan
- Party: Indian National Congress
- Alliance: UDF
- Elected year: 2026

Mananthavady is one of the 140 state legislative assembly constituencies in Kerala in southern India. It is also one of the seven state legislative assembly constituencies included in Wayanad Lok Sabha constituency. As of the 2026 Assembly elections, the current MLA is Usha Vijayan of Indian National Congress.

Mananthavady Assembly constituency was established by the 2008 delimitation. From 1965 to 2008, it was known as North Wynad.

== Local self-governed segments ==
Sl no.	Name	Status (Grama panchayat/Municipality)	Taluk	Ruling alliance
1	Mananthavady	Municipality	Mananthavady	UDF
2	Vellamunda	Grama panchayat	Mananthavady	UDF
3	Edavaka	Grama panchayat	Mananthavady	UDF
4	Panamaram	Grama panchayat	Mananthavady	UDF
5	Thavinhal	Grama panchayat	Mananthavady	UDF
6	Thirunelly	Grama panchayat	Mananthavady	LDF
7	Thondernad	Grama panchayat	Mananthavady	UDF

== Members of the Legislative Assembly ==
The following list contains all members of Kerala Legislative Assembly who have represented Mananthavady Assembly constituency during the period of various assemblies:

=== As North Wynad / Mananthavady(ST) ===
Year	Name	Party
1965	K. K. Annan	Communist Party of India (Marxist)
1967	K. K. Annan	Communist Party of India (Marxist)
1970	M. V. Rajan	Indian National Congress
1977	M. V. Rajan	Indian National Congress
1980	M. V. Rajan	Indian National Congress
1982	M. V. Rajan	Indian National Congress
1987	K. Raghavan Master	Indian National Congress
1991	K. Raghavan Master	Indian National Congress
1996	Radha Raghavan	Indian National Congress
2001	Radha Raghavan	Indian National Congress
2006	K. C. Kunhiraman	Communist Party of India (Marxist)
2011	P. K. Jayalakshmi	Indian National Congress
2016	O. R. Kelu	Communist Party of India (Marxist)
2021	O. R. Kelu	Communist Party of India (Marxist)
2026	Usha Vijayan	Indian National Congress

== Election results ==
=== 2026 ===
2026 Kerala Legislative Assembly election: Manathavady
Party	Candidate	Votes	%	±%
INC	Usha Vijayan	77,425	46.92	▲5.46
CPI(M)	O. R. Kelu	66,882	40.53	▼7.01
BJP	P. Shyamraj	19,681	11.93	▲3.31
NOTA	None of the above	1,018	0.62	
Margin of victory		10,543	6.39	▲1.19
Turnout		1,65,006	75.89	
INC gain from CPI(M)		Swing	▲6.39	

=== 2021 ===
2021 Kerala Legislative Assembly election: Mananthavady
Party	Candidate	Votes	%	±%
CPI(M)	O. R. Kelu	72,536	47.54	▲4.3
INC	P. K. Jayalakshmi	63,254	41.46	▼0.8
BJP	Palliyara Mukundan	13,142	8.62	▼2.6
SDPI	Babitha Sreenu	1992	1.31	
Majority		9282	6.1	▲5.20
Turnout		1,51,784		
Registered electors		1,86,656		
CPI(M) hold		Swing		

=== 2016 ===
There were 1,87,760 registered voters in Mananthavady Assembly constituency for the 2016 Assembly election.

2016 Kerala Legislative Assembly election: Mananthavady
Party	Candidate	Votes	%	±%
CPI(M)	O. R. Kelu	62,436	43.10	▲2.58
INC	P. K. Jayalakshmi	61,129	42.20	▼8.58
BJP	K. Mohandas	16,230	11.20	▲6.58
SDPI	Soman P. N.	1,377	0.95	▼0.94
Independent	Lakshmi	1,300	0.89	−
NOTA	None of the above	1,050	0.72	−
BSP	Annan Madakkimala	679	0.47	▼0.31
Independent	Kelu Chayimmal	583	0.40	−
CPI(ML)L	Vijayan	224	0.15	−
Independent	Usha K.	205	0.14	−
Independent	Kelu Kolliyil	196	0.13	−
Independent	Nittamani K. Kunhiraman	183	0.13	−
Margin of victory		1,307	0.90	
Turnout		1,87,377	77.30	▲3.06
CPI(M) gain from INC		Swing		

=== 2011 ===
There were 1,67,097 registered voters in the constituency for the 2011 election.

2011 Kerala Legislative Assembly election: Mananthavady
Party	Candidate	Votes	%	±%
INC	P. K. Jayalakshmi	62,996	50.78	
CPI(M)	K. C. Kunhiraman	50,262	40.52	
BJP	Irumuttoor Kunhiraman	5,732	4.62	
SDPI	A. Gopakumar	2,342	1.89	
Independent	P. U. Babu	1,712	1.38	
BSP	Annan Madakkimala	1,008	0.81	
Margin of victory		12,734	10.26	
Turnout		1,24,052	74.24	
INC win (new seat)				

== See also ==
- Mananthavady
- Wayanad district
- List of constituencies of the Kerala Legislative Assembly
- 2016 Kerala Legislative Assembly election
