= BSES Kerala Power Limited =

- Country: India
- Location: Eloor, Kochi
- Coordinates: 10.0697°N 76.3029°E
- Status: Operational
- Commission date: 23 November 2001
- Owner: Reliance Infrastructure
- Operator: Bombay Suburban Electricity Supply (BSES)

Thermal power station
- Primary fuel: Naphtha
- Combined cycle?: Yes

Power generation
- Units operational: 3 X 42.0 MW; 1 X 39.0 MW
- Nameplate capacity: 165 MW

BSES Kerala Power Limited is an independent power producer incorporated on 4 April 1996. It was established as a joint-venture by Bombay Suburban Electricity Supply (BSES) and Kerala State Industrial Development Corporation Ltd (KSIDC). In December 2006, the Reliance Infrastructure bought stake in KSIDC and thus BSES Kerala Power became a wholly owned subsidiary of Reliance Infrastructure. The company is engaged in the activity of power generation. It operates one naphtha based Combined Cycle power plant at Udyogmandal, Kochi.

== Overview ==
The plant’s nominal capacity is 165 MW in combined cycle mode of operation and the contracted capacity is net export of 157 MW at interconnection point.

The Power Station consists of three GE make LM 6000 PC series, state-of-the-art aeroderivative Gas Turbines Generators (GTGs), suitable for dual-fuel operation. The GTGs and auxiliaries have been packaged, supplied and set up by Stewart & Stevenson, Houston, USA. Three dual pressure-45 tons/hour Heat Recovery Steam Generators (HRSGs) were supplied and set up by Thermax Babcok & Wilcox Limited. 39M W Steam Turbine Generators (STG) and auxiliaries have been supplied, set up and commissioned by Bharat Heavy Electricals Limited (BHEL). The combined cycle power station started commercial operation on 23 November 2001.

== Capacity ==
Unit	Installed Capacity (MW)	Date of Commissioning	Fuel	Status	Turbine Model/Type
1	42.00	23-Nov-2001	naphtha/HSD	Operational	GE LM6000 PC NLW
2	42.00	23-Nov-2001	naphtha/HSD	Operational	GE LM6000 PC NLW
3	42.00	23-Nov-2001	naphtha/HSD	Operational	GE LM6000 PC NLW
4	39.00	23-Nov-2001	Steam from Other Units	Operational	HNK 71/3.2- 4, BHEL make

BSES Kerala Power has entered into a power purchase agreement with KSEB for the combined cycle operation. In fiscal year 2008, the power plant of BSES Kerala Power generated 373.989 MU of electricity at an average PLF of 25.12%. It has a fuel supply agreement with Indian Oil Corporation Limited for supplying naphtha. Under a PPA, the electricity generated by the company is also supplied to KSIDC. It proposes to use liquified natural gas (LNG) from the Kochi terminal in future.

== See also ==
- Rajiv Gandhi Combined Cycle Power Plant
- Brahmapuram Diesel Power Plant
- List of power stations in India
