= Inter University Center for Bioscience =

Inter University Centre for Bioscience (IUCB) was established at the School of Life Sciences, Kannur University, Kerala, India, by the Higher Education Department, Government of Kerala, to be a global center of excellence for research in biological sciences. Former Vice-President of India Mohammad Hamid Ansari inaugurated the centre on July 10, 2010. IUCB also have a herbal garden in its premises named after E.K. Janaki Ammal, renowned ethnobotanist from Thalassery who was the former Director-General of the Botanical Survey of India. The School of Life Sciences together with Inter University Center for Bioscience have active research collaborations with different research Institutes and industries across the country.
