= Peringalkuthu Dam =

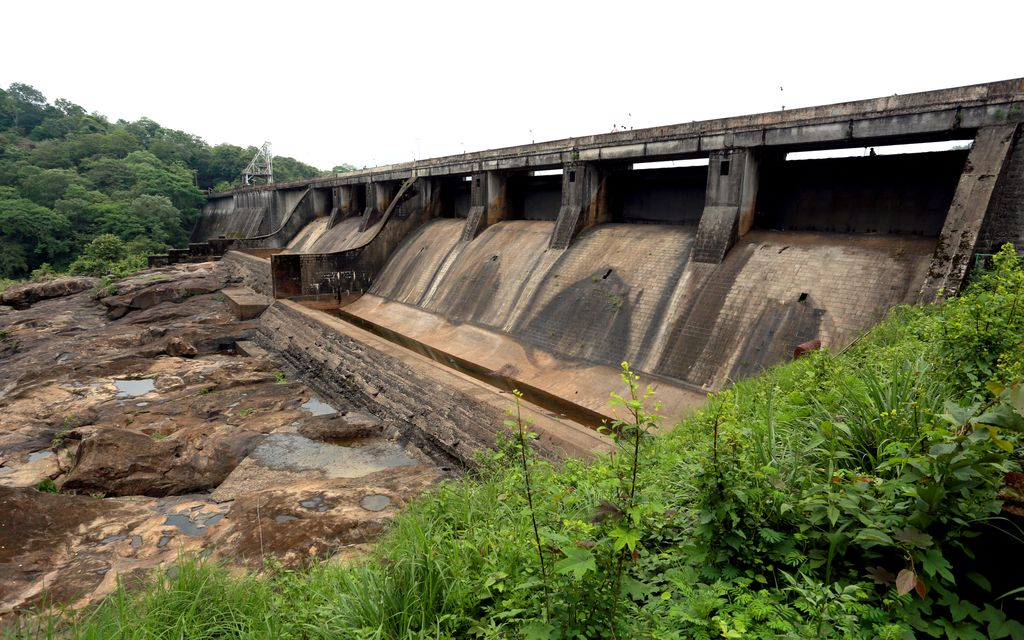
- Shutter of Peringalkuthu Dam

- Location within India Location within Kerala
- Official name: Peringalkuthu Dam
- Location: Chalakudy, Thrissur, Kerala
- Coordinates: 10.3152°N 76.6344°E
- Construction began: 1949
- Opening date: 15 May 1957
- Operator: Kerala State Electricity Board

Dam and spillways
- Impounds: Chalakkudi River
- Height: 23 m (75 ft)
- Length: 290.25 m (952.3 ft)

Reservoir
- Creates: Chalakkudi River

Peringalkuthu Dam is a concrete dam built across the Chalakkudi River in the Thrissur district, Kerala state of India. It also contains the Peringalkuthu Hydro Electric Power Project of Kerala State Electricity Board, who owns the dam. This is the first hydroelectric power project to be built on the Chalakkudi River. The gross storage capacity of the dam is 32 million cubic meters (1.13 tmc ft). The dam is situated in a deep forest, and special permission is needed to visit the dam.

== History ==
Construction of the dam began in 1949 and it was commissioned on 15 May 1957, making it the first hydroelectric power project built on the Chalakkudi River. The Peringalkuthu left bank extension (PLBE) scheme was later added, laying an additional penstock from the reservoir to reduce spillage during heavy monsoons, with a powerhouse of one 16 MW unit.

=== 2018 floods and shutter damage ===
During the 2018 Kerala floods in August, unusually heavy rainfall across Kerala caused most of the state's dams, including Peringalkuthu, to fill to near their full reservoir level, with the gates of about 35 dams opened due to the extremely large inflow of water. Unlike most Kerala dams, whose shutters are regulated by lifting them to release water, Peringalkuthu operates on a reverse design; this configuration and the tree's stuck on the mouth of the spillways is believed to have contributed to damage sustained by the dam's shutters during the deluge.

Following the damage, water continued to flow out of the dam even after its sluice gates were closed, and an estimated 70 per cent of the reservoir's stored water drained out, leaving large parts of the reservoir bed dry. The August floods also washed away a section of the access road to the dam and destroyed a nearby tourist park, leaving only a deep chasm where it once stood. The Kerala State Electricity Board estimated that repairing the damaged shutters would take around six months.

=== Restoration and subsequent operation ===
After repair works were completed, restrictions that had been placed on water storage at the dam following the 2018 damage were lifted, and the dam and its power project returned to normal operation. In subsequent years, the dam's shutters have continued to be opened during periods of heavy monsoon rainfall as a precautionary measure, with red-alert warnings issued to residents along the Chalakkudi River when water levels approach the dam's maximum capacity.

== Reservoir ==
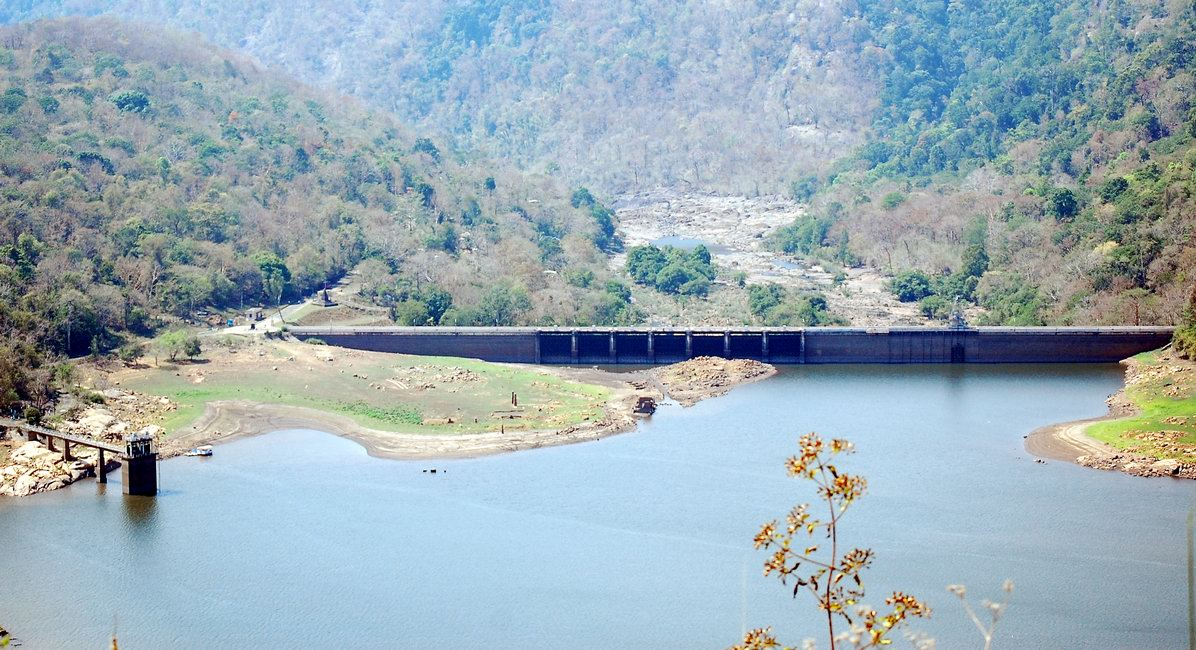
Reservoir side

The Poringalkuthu reservoir is created by constructing a dam across the Chalakudy River. The inflow of the Poringalkuthu reservoir is contributed partly from the tailwater of upstream Sholayar HEP. In addition, the reservoir receives water from catchments downstream of the Parambikulam and Thunakadavu dams of the PAP Project. The spill waters of the above dams also flow to this reservoir. The water from the Poringalkuthu reservoir is diverted through a water conductor system to two Powerhouses of the Poringalkuthu Hydro Electric Project (PHEP) and Porigalkuthu left bank Extension scheme located on the left bank of the Chalakudy River. After generating power, the water is released into the Chalakudy River.

== Peringalkuthu left bank extension ==
The Peringalkuthu left bank extension project was made by laying an additional penstock from the Peringalkuthu reservoir to avoid the dam spill during intense monsoon. The powerhouse comprises one unit of 16 MW capacity. After power generation, water from Peringalkuthu & PLBE is released to the Chalakudi River.

== See also ==
- List of reservoirs and dams in India
- 2018 Kerala floods
