= Vazhempuram =

Village in Palakkad district, India

Vazhempuram is a location in Karakurissi Grama Panchayath in Palakkad district of Kerala.

== Location ==
Vazhempuram is approximately 2 km from the National Highway 966. It is a rural area. It is around 32 km from the district headquarters. Vazhempuram comes under the Karakurissi village with PIN code 678595. Karakurussi Grama panchayt, Govt Ayurveda Dispensary, Karakurussi Cooperative Bank etc. are located at Vazhempuram. Kanjirapuzha dam, one of the major tourist locations in the district is situated just 13 km from here. It is one of the 85 gram panchayats in Palakkad district.

== Nomenclature ==
The name Vazhempuram consists of two parts: 'Vazha' means plantain and 'puram' means town in Malayalam.

== Religion ==
Vazhempuram is a Muslim dominated area with a number of Hindu families are living in perfect harmony with other religious groups. Christians are minority here. Chullissery Sree Rama Swamy Temple, Kannayil Bhuvaneswary Temple etc. are the major Hindu temples here. Vazhempuram Sunni Juma Masjid, Arappara St. Sebastians Church are located within 1 km radius of the location.

== Hospitals and healthcare facilities ==
Close to the Karakurussi Grama Panchath office, there is a Government Ayurveda Dispensary is functioning. There are a number of private allopathic medicinal practitioners, homeopathic practitioners are available in this area.

== Educational facilities ==
The educational needs of the children are catered by Aided Mappila Upper Primary School, Karakurussi. Sree Ramakrishna Vidyanikethan, Vazhempuam is also now provide ample educational opportunities up to class 5.

== Culture ==
Vazhempuram village is a predominantly Muslim populated area. Hindus exist in smaller numbers. The culture of the locality is based upon Muslim traditions. Duff Muttu, Kolkali and Aravanamuttu are common folk arts. The Hindu minority of this area keeps their traditions by celebrating various festivals in their temples. Hindu rituals are done here with a regular devotion like other parts of Kerala. The 'Palli Perunnal' of St. Sebastian's Church is also celebrated in splendid manner.

== Transportation ==
Vazhempuram village is connected to National Highway 966 via Ponnamkode-Karakurussi Road. This national highway connects Palakkad with Kozhikode via Malappuram. This area is connected to Mannarkkad via Tipu Sultan Road. The nearest Railway station is Palghat Junction. The nearest airport is Kozhikode International Airport.
