= Vaccine refrigerator =

Refrigerator that stores vaccines and other medical products

Vaccine refrigerators are designed to store vaccines and other medical products at a stable temperature to ensure they do not degrade. In developing countries with a sunny climate, solar-powered vaccine refrigerators are common.

== Requirements for vaccine refrigeration ==
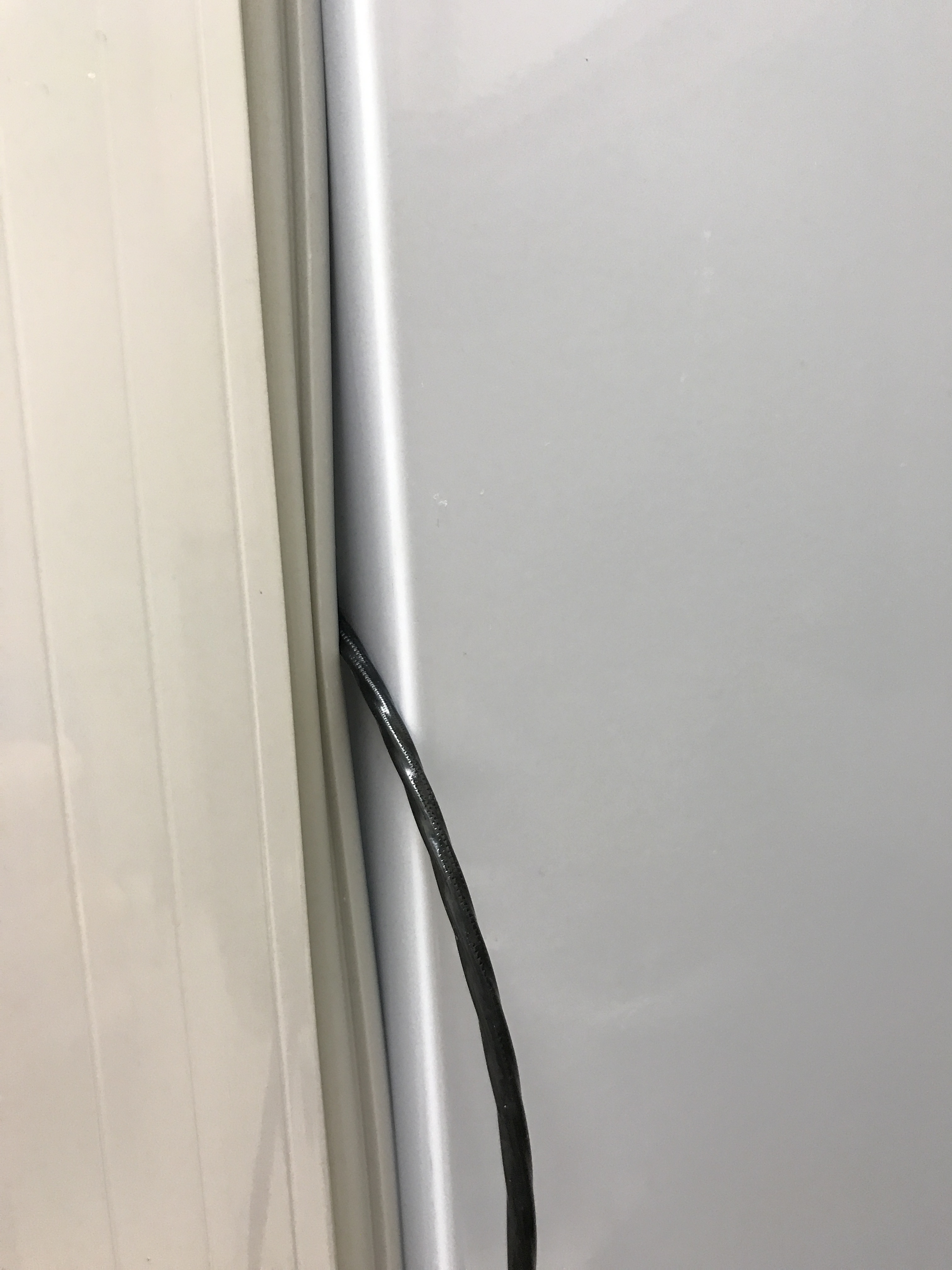
Data logging cable shown running through the door gasket, creating a gap which air can enter and escape through.

Many vaccines must be stored at low temperatures, some below -15 °C, and others between 2 and 8 °C. as in an Ice Lined Refrigerator (ILR). If vaccines are not stored correctly they can lose their effectiveness.

According to the Center for Disease Control, failure to adhere to recommended specifications for storage and handling of immunobiologics can reduce or destroy their potency, resulting in inadequate or no immune response in the recipient. Maintenance of vaccine quality is the shared responsibility of all handlers of vaccines from the time a vaccine is manufactured until administration.

According to the Immunization Action Coalition, all vaccines should be stored in a refrigerator or freezer that is designed specifically for the storage of biologics or, alternatively, in a separate dedicated unit. A dorm-style combination refrigerator-freezer unit with just one exterior door has been shown to be unacceptable no matter where the vaccine was placed inside the unit. Stand-alone refrigerator or freezer units are best for storage needs. With retail pharmacies playing a major role in pneumonia, influenza and shingles immunization programs, the value of critical vaccines being stored in pharmacy refrigerators has increased. In 2022, it is not uncommon for many pharmacies to have over $100,000 of product in a single refrigerator during peak seasons.

It is estimated that $20 million is wasted annually from poor refrigeration, and up to 35% of vaccines are affected by improper storage. Accurate and uniform temperature in a refrigerator plays a key role in ensuring the life of vaccines, reagents and other biologicals. Research has shown that minor variances in temperature such as those in a household refrigerator can compromise the effectiveness of your biologicals, risking up to thousands of dollars in valuable contents.

Vaccines are also compromised through improper use of the door gasket to feed cables from data loggers and thermometers, allowing excess warm air in, and cold air out of the refrigerator or freezer. Over time this causes the compressor to work a longer duty cycle and eventually leads to failure. This can be remedied by using probe access ports, found on most clinical refrigerators and freezer. These are easy to open up and drastically reduce air intake and loss from inside the units.

== Solar powered vaccine refrigerators ==
In developing countries the electricity grid often does not reach rural areas, and is not always reliable. As keeping vaccines at the appropriate temperature is vital, Solar powered refrigerators are a cost-effective alternative that can be highly reliable. A typical system will use a solar photovoltaic panel to generate electricity from sunlight, and a deep cycle battery to store energy for operation overnight, although newer fridges which have revolutionary Sure Chill Technology or Direct Drive technology do not need batteries to maintain temperatures for many days without sunlight.

== WHO prequalified products ==
The World Health Organization Immunization Devices Prequalification (IMD-PQS) programme maintains a list of immunization cold chain equipment that it has prequalified for procurement and use by national immunization programmes of the WHOs Expanded Programme on Immunization (EPI), including refrigerators. IMD-PQS prequalifies products based on rigorous performance specifications that it develops in collaboration with national immunization programmes and in consultation with product manufacturers, to ensure that products address the specific needs of immunization programmes’ operating environments.

== See also ==
- Solar power
- Vaccines
