= P. K. Jayalakshmi =

Indian politician

P.K. Jayalakshmi
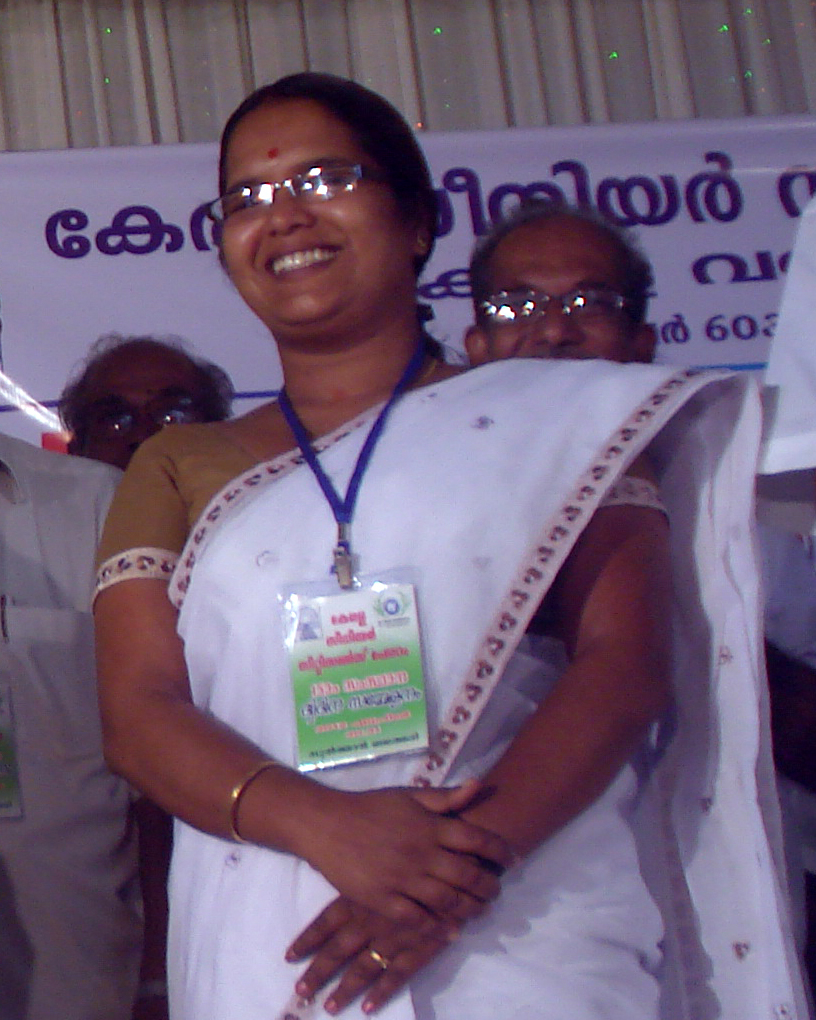

Minister for Welfare of Scheduled Tribes, Yoth Affairs, Muzeum and Zoo, Government of Kerala
- In office 2011–2016
- Chief MInister: Oommen Chandy
- Departments: Scheduled Tribe; Youth Welfare; State Archives; Museums, Zoo
- Preceded by: A. K. Balan (Scheduled Communities); V. Surendran Pillai (Youth Welfare)
- Succeeded by: A. K. Balan (Scheduled Tribes); E. P. Jayarajan (Youth Affairs); K. Raju (Zoos); K. Ramachandran (Museums)

Member of the Kerala Legislative Assembly
- In office May 2011 – May 2016
- Preceded by: K. C. Kunhiraman
- Succeeded by: O. R. Kelu
- Constituency: Mananthavady

Personal details
- Born: 3 October 1980 (age 45) Valad, Mananthavady, Kerala
- Party: Indian National Congress
- Spouse: C. A. Anilkumar (m. 2015)
- Education: Government College Mananthavady, Kannur University (BA)

P. K. Jayalakshmi is an Indian politician and the former Minister for Welfare of Backward Communities, Youth affairs, Muzeum and Zoo in the state Government of Kerala.

== Life ==
On 10 May 2015, she married C. A. Anilkumar, who is the grand-nephew of her father. Their marriage took place according to the traditions of Kurichiya tribe. She graduated in BA English from Government College Mananthavady. She became only the third minister in Kerala to marry while holding office.

== See also ==
- Government of Kerala
- Kerala Ministers
