= John Houghton (physicist) =

Welsh physicist (1931–2020)

Sir John Houghton CBE FRS FLSW
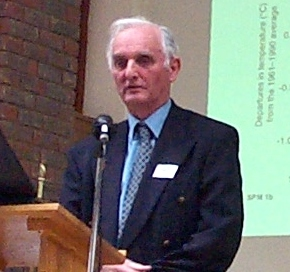
- Sir John Houghton speaking at a climate change conference in 2005
- Born: John Theodore Houghton; 30 December 1931; Dyserth, Wales
- Died: 15 April 2020 (aged 88); Dolgellau, Wales
- Citizenship: United Kingdom
- Education: Jesus College, Oxford (BA 1951, MA 1955, DPhil 1955)
- Spouses: Margaret Broughton (m. 1962; died 1986); Sheila Thompson (m. 1988)
- Children: 2
- Awards: The Chree Medal and Prize (1979); Japan Prize (2006); Albert Einstein World Award of Science (2009)
- Scientific career
- Fields: Atmospheric physics
- Workplaces: University of Oxford; Met Office

Sir John Theodore Houghton CBE FRS FLSW (30 December 1931 – 15 April 2020) was a Welsh atmospheric physicist who was the co-chair of the Intergovernmental Panel on Climate Change's (IPCC) scientific assessment working group which shared the Nobel Peace Prize in 2007 with Al Gore. He was lead editor of the first three IPCC reports. He was professor in atmospheric physics at the University of Oxford, former Director General at the Met Office and founder of the Hadley Centre.

He was the president of the John Ray Initiative, an organisation "connecting Environment, Science and Christianity", where he has compared the stewardship of the Earth, to the stewardship of the Garden of Eden by Adam and Eve. He was a founding member of the International Society for Science and Religion. He became the president of the Victoria Institute in 2005.

== Biography ==
Born in Dyserth, John Theodore Houghton was the second of the three sons of Sidney and Miriam (née Yarwood) Houghton. His older brother, David (died 2015), became a meteorologist. The third and youngest brother, Paul Houghton, became a lecturer in engineering and was treasurer and company chairman of the John Ray Initiative, connecting the environment, science and Christianity.

The family moved to Rhyl when John was two, and he attended Rhyl Grammar School where he discovered his interest in science. He continued his education at Jesus College, Oxford, gaining a BA in 1951, MA (Oxon) and DPhil in 1955.

He was brought up as an evangelical Christian by devout Christian parents and believed in science and Christianity as strengthening each other, as well as Christianity and environmentalism. Houghton's evangelical Christianity combined with his scientific background made him a significant voice in evangelical Christian circles. He was a supporter of and advisor to the international Christian relief and development agency Tearfund. He was also an elder at Aberdovey Presbyterian Church.

In 1962, Houghton married Dr Margaret Broughton, daughter of a mill owner in Colwyn, Lancashire, and they had two children and seven grandchildren. Following her death from cancer in 1986, he set up the Margaret Houghton Memorial Fund, a research unit on medical nursing in her memory. He married his second wife, Sheila Thompson, in 1988.

Posts include:

- a Member of the UK Government Panel on Sustainable Development (1994–2000)
- Chairman, Royal Commission on Environmental Pollution (1992–98)
- Chairman or co-chairman, Scientific Assessment Working Group, Intergovernmental Panel on Climate Change (1988–2002)
- Director General (later Chief Executive), UK Meteorological Office (1983–91)
- Director Appleton, Science and Engineering Research Council (also deputy director, Rutherford Appleton Laboratory)(1979–83)
- Professor of Atmospheric Physics, Oxford University (1973–83).

He was knighted in 1991. Houghton was an Honorary Scientist of the Hadley Centre for Climate Prediction and Research at the Met Office (since 2002); Honorary Scientist at the Rutherford Appleton Laboratory (since 1991); a Trustee of the Shell Foundation (since 2000); Chairman of the John Ray Initiative (since 1997) and in 2013 was announced as an advisory board member for Sure Chill Technology. He moved back to Wales and lived in Aberdyfi. In 2007 he criticised the controversial documentary The Great Global Warming Swindle for its inaccuracies.

He died of complications from Alzheimer's disease and COVID-19 in hospital at Dolgellau on 15 April 2020, aged 88.

== Awards and honours ==
- Albert Einstein World Award of Science (2009)
- Japan Prize (2006)
- International Meteorological Organization Prize (1998)
- American Meteorological Society, Honorary Member (1998)
- Gold Medal of the Royal Astronomical Society (1995)
- Global 500 Award, under the United Nations Environmental Programme (1994)
- Bakerian Lecture of the Royal Society (1991)
- Knight Bachelor (1991)
- Symons Gold Medal, Royal Meteorological Society (1990)
- Richard Glazebrook Medal and Prize, Institute of Physics, (1990)
- William Gaskell Medal of the Royal Meteorological Society, (1983)
- The Chree medal and prize (1979)
- President of the Royal Meteorological Society (1976–1978)
- Elected Fellow of the Royal Society (1972)

He received Honorary Doctorates of Science from the Universities of Wales (1991), Stirling (1992), East Anglia (1993), Leeds (1995), Heriot-Watt (1996), Greenwich (1997), Glamorgan (1998), Reading (1999), Birmingham (2000), Gloucestershire (2001), Hull (2002) and Dalhousie (2010). He was an Honorary Fellow of Jesus College, Oxford, University of Wales, Aberystwyth and of University of Wales, Lampeter and was also a Founding Fellow of the Learned Society of Wales.

== Legacy ==
A metal sculpture of Sir John Houghton was erected in Rhyl in 2013, together with figures of two other local celebrities, Don Spendlove and Mike Peters.

== Selected publications ==
- Does God Play Dice? 1988, Intervarsity Press
- Global Warming, the Complete Briefing, 1994, Lion Publishing (2nd edition 1997, Cambridge University Press; 3rd edition 2004, Cambridge University Press; 4th edition 2010, Cambridge University Press; 5th edition 2015, Cambridge University Press)
- The search for God; can science help? 1995, Lion Publishing
- Physics of Atmospheres, 1977. 2nd edition 1986, 3rd edition 2002, Cambridge University Press.
- Climate Change, the IPCC Scientific Assessment, eds J.T. Houghton, G.J. Jenkins and J.J. Ephraums, 1990, Cambridge University Press
- Climate Change 1992, the Supplementary Report to the IPCC Scientific Assessment, eds. J.T. Houghton, B.A. Callander and S.K. Varney, 1992, Cambridge University Press
- Climate Change 1994, Radiative Forcing of Climate Change and an Evaluation of the IPCC IS92 Emission Scenarios, eds. J.T. Houghton, L.G. Meira Filho, J. Bruce, Hoesung Lee, B.A. Callander, E. Haites, N. Harris and K. Maskell, 1994, Cambridge University Press
- Climate Change 1995, the Science of Climate Change, eds. J.T. Houghton, L.G. Meira Filho, B.A.Callander, N. Harris, A. Kattenberg and K. Maskell, 1995, Cambridge University Press
- Climate Change 2001, The Scientific Basis, eds J.T. Houghton, Y. Ding, D.J. Griggs, M. Noguer, P.J. van der Linden, X. Dai, K. Maskell, C.A. Johnson, 2001 Cambridge University Press

== Misquotation ==
In a November 2006 article in Australia's The Daily Telegraph, journalist Piers Akerman quoted Houghton as saying "Unless we announce disasters, no one will listen", attributing the quotation to his 1994 book Global Warming, The Complete Briefing. This has since been quoted by many deniers, including Benny Peiser and Christopher Monckton, and is listed at the top of the front page of Christopher Booker's The Real Global Warming Disaster. However, the quotation does not appear in any edition of Houghton's book. Houghton never said any such thing and believed the opposite. The publishers of The Real Global Warming Disaster, The Continuum International Publishing Group, apologised for the reference to that quotation, confirmed (in addition to Booker's confirmation) that it will not be repeated, and agreed to place a corrigendum in any further copies of the book.

In an article which appeared in The Sunday Telegraph on 20 February 2010, Christopher Booker purported to correct the misquotation contained in The Real Global Warming Disaster but this article contained yet further inaccuracies. As a result, Houghton referred the matter to the Press Complaints Commission (PCC Reference 101959). Following the PCC's involvement, The Sunday Telegraph published on 15 August 2010 a letter of correction by Houghton stating his true position. An article supportive of Houghton also appeared in the edition of 21 May 2010 of New Scientist.

The correct quotation was, "If we want a good environmental policy in the future we'll have to have a disaster. It's like safety on public transport. The only way humans will act is if there's been an accident."
