= Mary Matha Arts & Science College =

College in India

Coordinates: 11.8263°N 76.0321°E

Mary Matha Arts and Science College
- Motto: Education for total liberation
- Type: Government-Aided
- Established: 1995
- Academic affiliations: Kannur University
- Location: Vemom, Mananthavady, Wayanad District, Kerala, India
- Website: http://www.marymathacollege.ac.in

Mary Matha Arts and Science College is a Government of India aided college in the State of Kerala that is affiliated to Kannur University and managed by the Syro Malabar Catholic Eparchy of Mananthavady.

== Overview ==
Located in Mananthavady,The college was formally inaugurated on 23rd October 1995, When Kannur University came into existence in 1996, the college became affiliated to it.

Mary Matha college was re-accredited in 2024 by the NAAC at A+ Grade. According to the directives of the NAAC, the college has established an IQAC for the sustenance and enhancement of quality in all accredited higher education institutions in India.

In 2026, the college started a self-defense training program for female students.

== See also ==
- Education in Kerala
