= K. Shanthakumari =

Indian politician

Member of the Kerala Legislative Assembly for Kongad
- In office May 2021 – 2026
- Preceded by: K. V. Vijayadas
- Succeeded by: K. A. Thulasi

Personal details
- Born: Kerala
- Party: Communist Party of India (Marxist)

K. Shanthakumari (born 1970) is an Indian politician serving as the MLA of Kongad Constituency since May 2021. She is a member of Communist Party of India (Marxist).
