= K. A. Thulasi =

Indian politician (born 1974)

Minister for Welfare of Scheduled Castes, Scheduled Tribes, and Backward Classes Government of Kerala
- Incumbent
- Assumed office 18 May 2026
- Governor: Rajendra Arlekar
- Chief Minister: V.D. Satheesan
- Portfolio(s): See list: Scheduled Castes Development; Scheduled Tribes Development; Backward Classes Development
- Preceded by: O. R. Kelu

Member of the Kerala Legislative Assembly
- Incumbent
- Assumed office 21 May 2026
- Preceded by: K. Shanthakumari
- Constituency: Kongad

Personal details
- Born: 1974 (age 51–52) Palakkad, Kerala, India
- Party: Indian National Congress
- Spouse: V. K. Sreekandan
- Education: Government Victoria College, Palakkad
- Occupation: Politician; Teacher

K. A. Thulasi, (born 1974), is an Indian politician and lecturer from Kerala, who is currently serving as the Minister for Welfare of Scheduled castes, Scheduled Tribes, and Backward Classes in the Government of Kerala. She is a member of the Kerala Legislative Assembly representing the Kongad constituency which is reserved for Scheduled Caste community in Palakkad district.

== Early life and education ==
Thulasi is from Palakkad district, Kerala. She is a postgraduate. She is the head of the Department of History at NSS College, Nenmara. She is also a general secretary of Kerala Pradesh Congress Committee. Her husband, V. K. Sreekandan, is a Member of Parliament, Lok Sabha for Palakkad Parliamentary Constituency.

== Career ==
Thulasi became an MLA for the first time winning the 2026 Kerala Legislative Assembly election from Kongad Assembly constituency representing the Indian National Congress. She polled 62,734 votes and defeated her nearest rival and advocate, K. Shanthakumari of the Communist Party of India (Marxist), by a margin of 3,706 votes.
