= Kannur University =

Public university in Kerala, India

Kannur University (KU)
- Motto: Tamasomā jyotir gamaya / തമസോമാ ജ്യോതിർഗമയ
- Motto in English: From darkness, lead me to light
- Type: Public
- Established: March 2, 1996; 30 years ago
- Affiliations: UGC, AIU, NAAC
- Chancellor: Governor of Kerala
- Vice-Chancellor: Dr. K. K. Saju
- Pro Chancellor: Roji M. John, Minister for Higher Education, Government of Kerala
- Location: Kannur, Kerala, India; 11.87598°N 75.37292°E
- Campus: Urban
- Website: kannuruniversity.ac.in

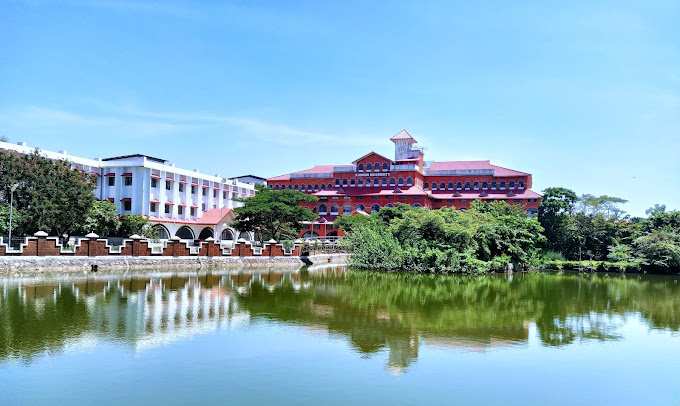
Kannur University Administrative Office, Thavakkara

Kannur University is a multi-campus public university established in 1996 to provide development of higher education in Kasaragod, Kannur, and Mananthavady Taluk Of Wayanad districts of Kerala, India. It serves the region of North Malabar. It was established after the passing of Act No. 22 of 1996 of the Kerala Legislative Assembly. A university by the name of "Malabar University" had come into existence even earlier by the passing of an ordinance by the Governor of Kerala, on 9 November 1995.

The university was inaugurated on 2 March 1996 by E. K. Nayanar, then Chief Minister of Kerala. The objective of the Kannur University Act, 1996 was to establish in the state of Kerala a teaching, residential and affiliating university to provide for the development of higher education in Kasaragod and Kannur revenue Districts and the Mananthavady Taluk of Wayanad District.

Kannur University is a multi-campus university, at Kannur, Kasaragod, Mananthavady, Payyannur, Mangattuparamba, Thalassery, Nileshwaram and Manjeshwaram.

== Inter University Centers ==
- Inter University Center for Bioscience, Thalassery campus, Palayad, Kerala, India

== School of Life Sciences ==
The School of Life Sciences hosts two departments, Department of Biotechnology and Microbiology, which were established in 2000 for conducting master's degree (M.Sc) courses and research (Ph.D) in Biotechnology and Microbiology. An Inter University Centre for Bioscience was also established at the department by the Higher Education Department, Government of Kerala, to be a global center of excellence for research in biological sciences. Master's degree course in computational biology was introduced in 2020.

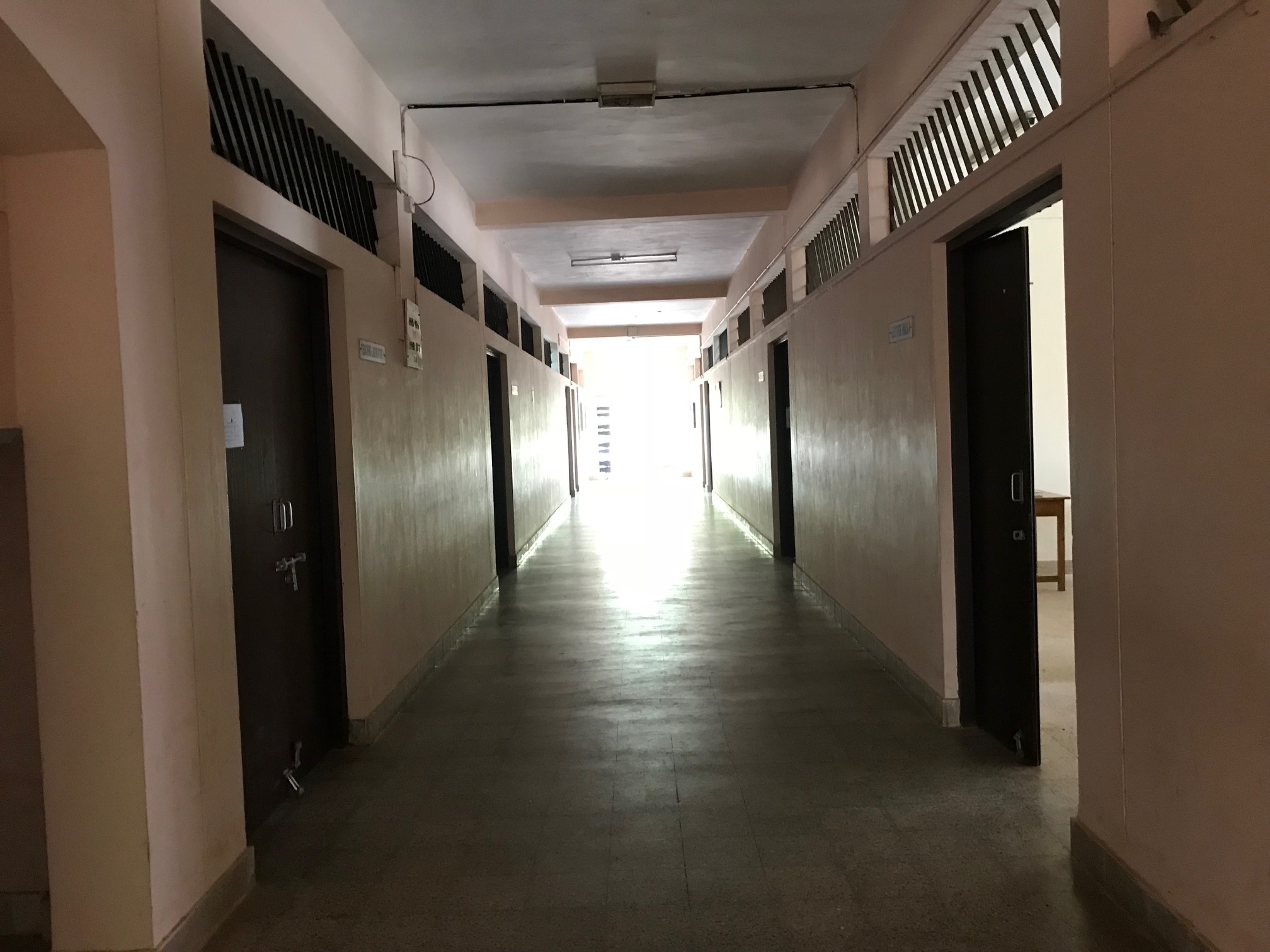
School of Life Sciences; View from the department corridor

The main area of research includes Structural biology, Computational biology, Medicinal chemistry, Enzymology, Microbial technology, Bioprocess technology, Immunology, Endocrinology, and Plant molecular biology. Research findings from the department have significantly contributed for the growth of macromolecular crystallography in India.

== Affiliated colleges ==
=== Government Colleges ===
- Government College Kasaragod
- Government College Mananthavady
- Government Brennen College, Dharmadam
- Govinda Pai College, Manjeshwar
- Krishna Menon Memorial Government Women's College

=== Arts and Science Colleges (Aided) ===
- Co-operative Arts & Science College, Madayi
- Mahathma Gandhi College, Iritty
- Mahatma College of Education, Pandikot
- Mary Matha Arts & Science College
- N.A.M. College, Kallikkandy
- Navajyothi College, Cherupuzha
- Nehru College, Kanhangad
- Nithyananda Institute of Technology, Kanhangad
- Payyannur College
- Nirmalagiri College, Kuthuparamba
- Pazhassi Raja N.S.S. College, Mattanur
- SES College, Sreekandapuram
- Sir Syed College, Taliparamba
- S. N. College, Kannur

=== Professional Colleges (Unaided) ===
- People Institute of Management Studies, Munnad
- Zainab College, Cherkkala

== Notable alumni ==
- Adv. A. N. Shamseer, 24th Speaker of Kerala Legislative Assembly
- K. V. Sumesh, Member of Kerala Legislative Assembly
- P. K. Jayalakshmi, Former Minister Government of Kerala
- Manju Warrier, Indian film Actress.
- C. K. Vineeth, Indian Footballer.
- Sayanora Philip, Playback singer
- M. Vijin, MLA
- Sahal Abdul Samad, Indian national football player
- Ganapathi S Poduval, Malayalam Film Actor
- Nikhila Vimal, Malayalam film actress
- Sanusha, Malayalam film actress

== Image gallery ==
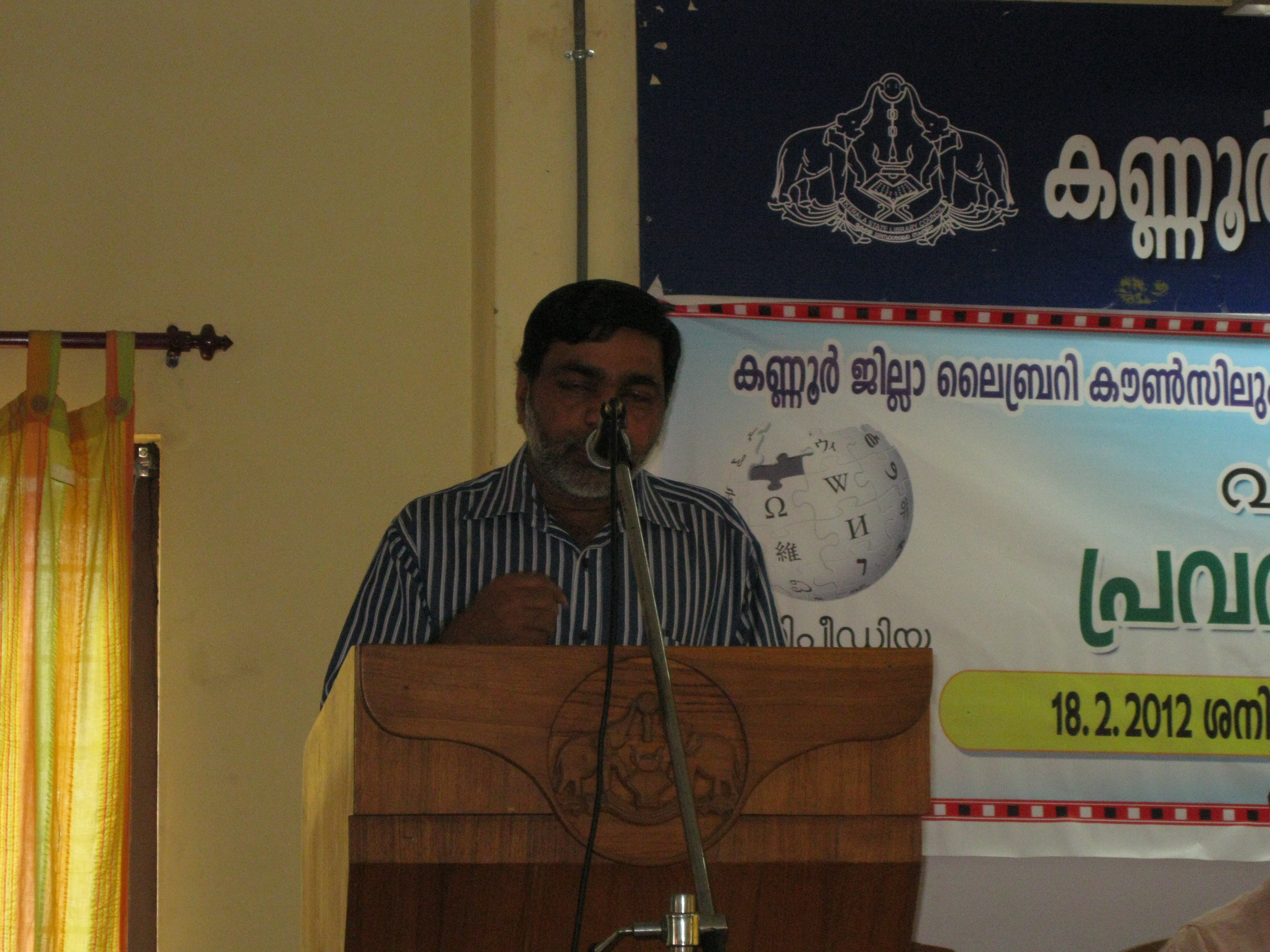
Pro Vice Chancellor

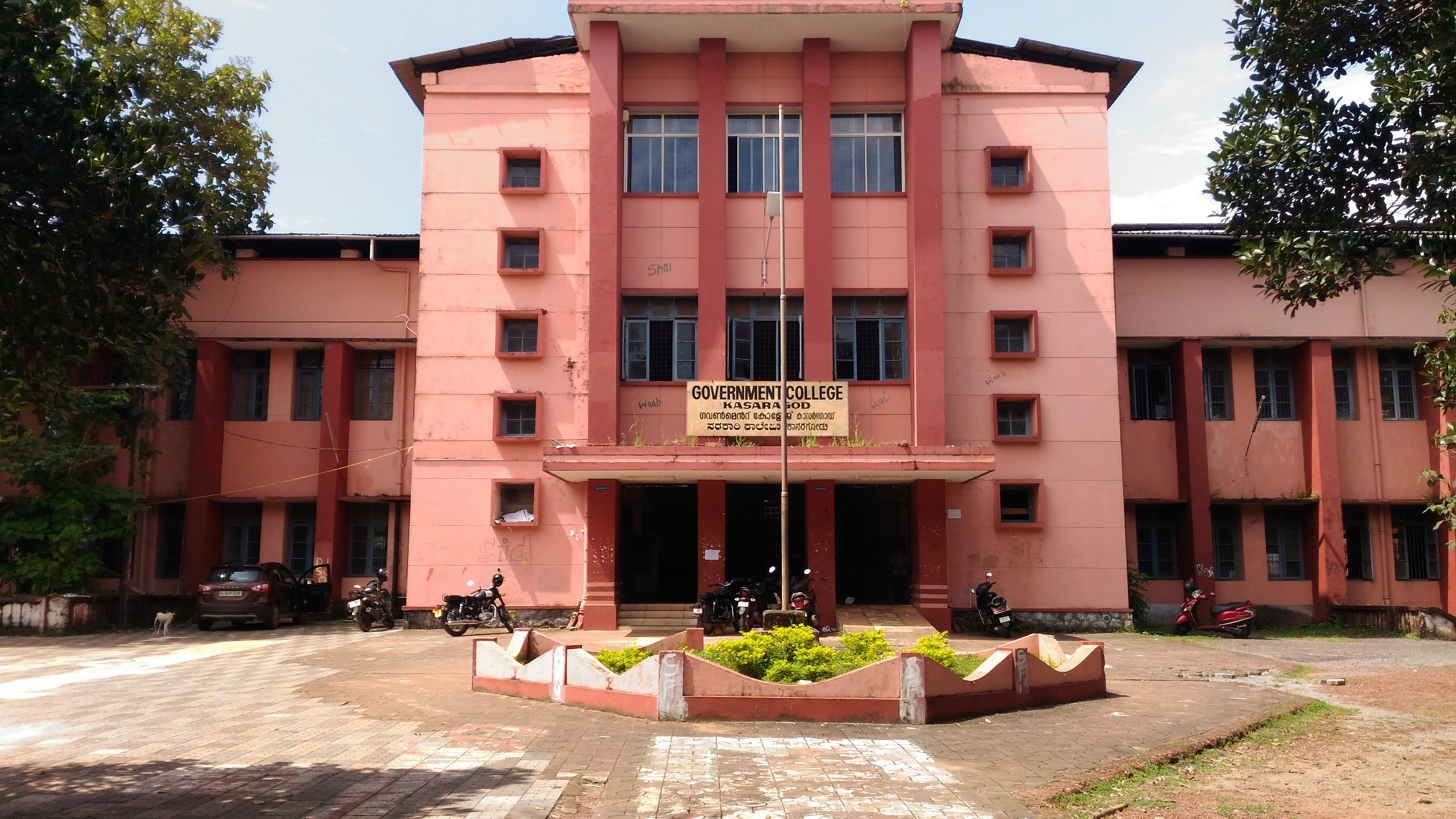
Government College Kasaragod

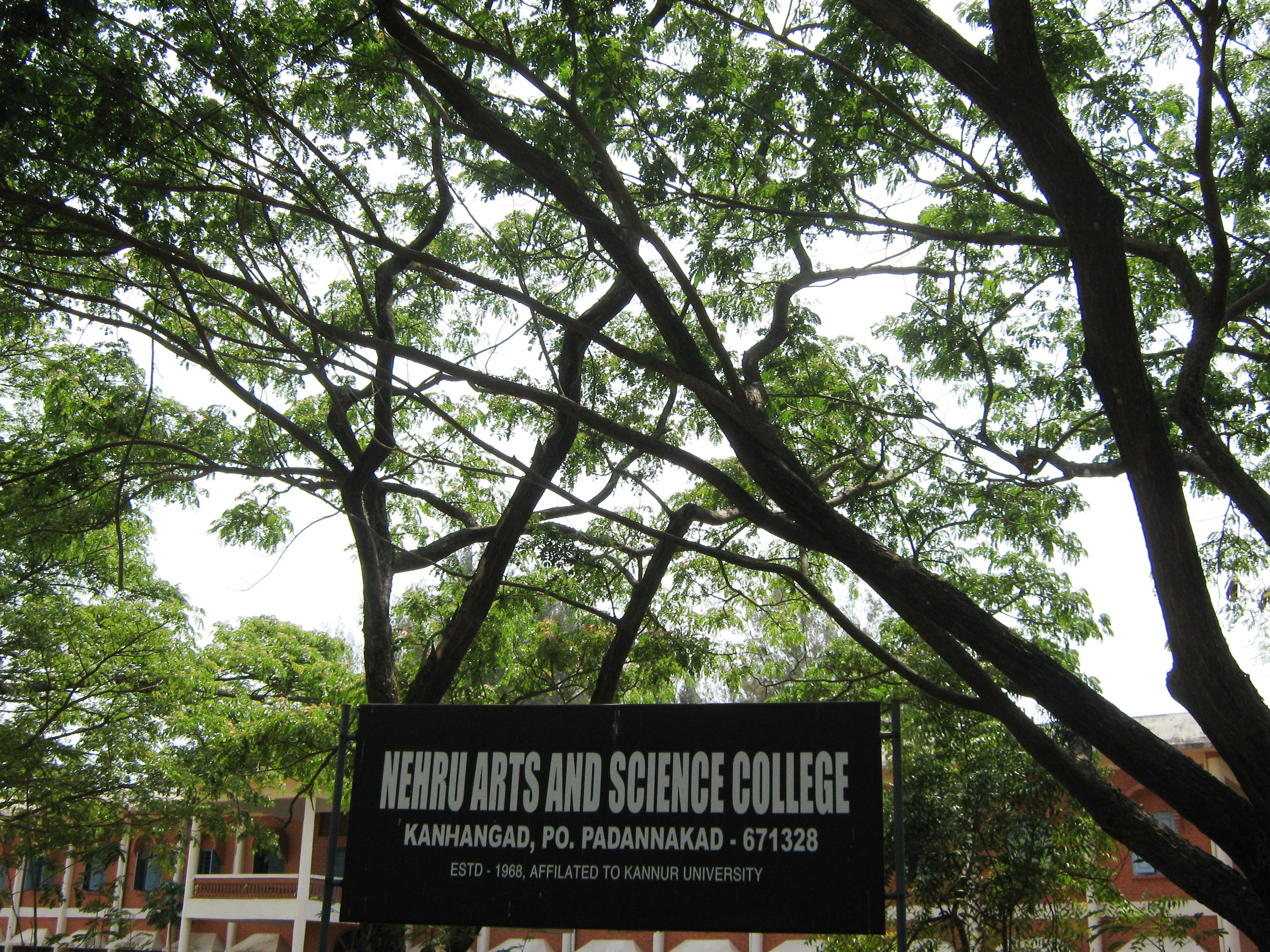
Nehru College, Kanhangad

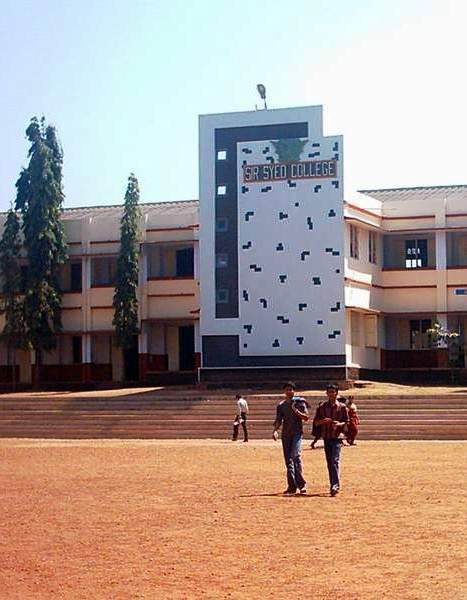
Sir Syed College, Taliparamba

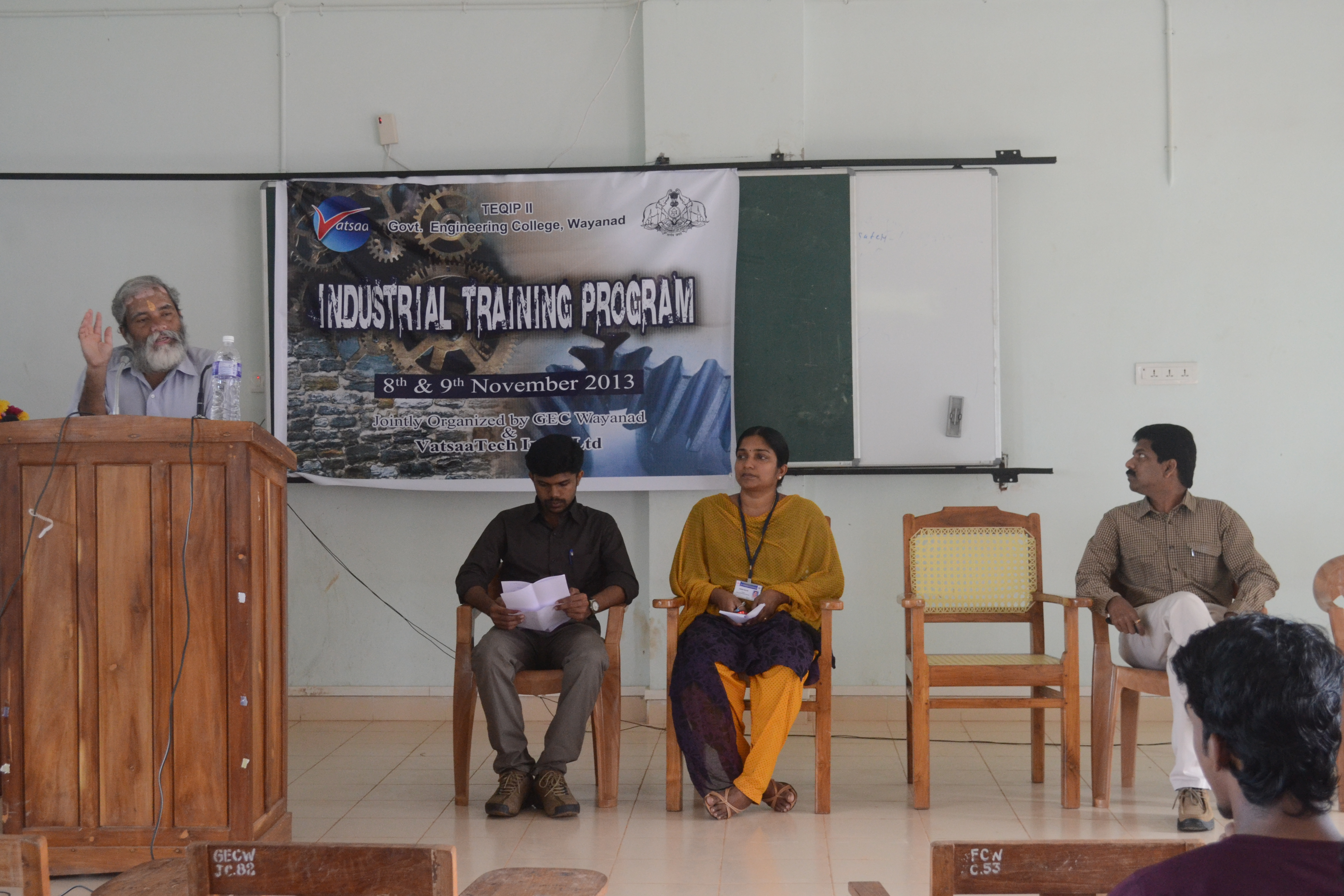
Government College, Mananthavady
