= Usha Vijayan =

Indian politician (born 1980)

Usha Vijayan (born 1980) is an Indian politician from Kerala. She is a Member of the Legislative Assembly from the Mananthavady Assembly constituency which is reserved for Scheduled Tribe community in Wayanad district representing the Indian National Congress.

Vijayan is from Wayanad district, Kerala. She did her schooling at Government Higher Secondary School, Padinjarathara, Kalpetta and passed Class 10 in 1997.

Vijayan became an MLA winning the 2026 Kerala Legislative Assembly election from the Mananthavady Assembly constituency representing the Indian National Congress. She polled 77,425 votes and defeated her nearest rival, O. R. Kelu of the Communist Party of India (Marxist), by a margin of 10,543 votes.
