= K. V. Vijayadas =

Indian politician (1959–2021)

- കെ.വി. വിജയദാസ്‌
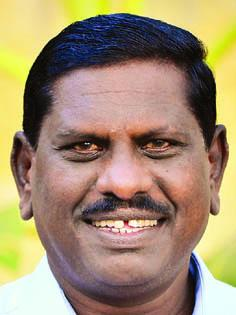

Member of Legislative Assembly, Kerala
- In office 1 June 2011 – 18 January 2021
- Preceded by: constituency created
- Succeeded by: K. Shanthakumari
- Constituency: Kongad

Personal details
- Party: Communist Party of India (Marxist)

K. V. Vijayadas (25 May 1959 – 18 January 2021) was an Indian politician who served as a Member of the Kerala Legislative Assembly for Kongad from 2011 till his death from COVID-19. He had tested positive for the COVID-19 earlier and died on 18 January 2021 at Thrissur Medical College.
