= Government College Mananthavady =

Indian government college

- Motto: 'Education for Total Liberation'
- Type: Government College
- Established: 1981
- Affiliations: Kannur University
- Principal: Dr. Abdul Salam (Principal in Charge)
- Students: 545
- Location: Mananthavady, Kerala, India; 11.8334°N 75.9701°E
- Language: English
- Website: www.gcmananthavady.ac.in
- Location in Kerala Government College Mananthavady (India)

Government College, Mananthavady is the oldest college of Mananthavady town in Wayanad District in India. The college was established in 1981 by Sri E. K. Nayanar, chief minister of Kerala. The college is re-accredited by NAAC with A Grade, CGPA 3.01 (2nd Cycle).

== Courses offered ==
- M.Com.Finance
- M.A Economics
- M.A English
- MSc. Electronics
- B.Com. Finance
- B.Sc.Electronics
- B.A.English
- B.A Development Economics

== Notable alumni ==
- P. K. Jayalakshmi, Former Minister Government of Kerala
