= Department of Backward Classes Development =

Department of the Government of Kerala

Department of Backward Communities Development

Department overview
- Jurisdiction: India Kerala
- Headquarters: Thiruvananthapuram, Kerala
- Minister responsible: K. A. Thulasi, Minister for the Welfare of Scheduled Castes, Scheduled Tribes and Backward Classes
- Department executive: Secretary to Government
- Parent department: Government of Kerala
- Child Department: Directorate of Backward Classes Development
- Website: bcdd.kerala.gov.in

The Department of Backward Communities Development is an administrative department of the Government of Kerala. The department is tasked with formulating and implementing policies aimed at promoting education, employment and overall welfare for Other Backward Classes (OBC) and Other Eligible Classes (OEC). It has its headquarters in Government Secretariat, Thiruvananthapuram.

== Leadership ==
The Department of Backward Classes Development is headed by a Cabinet Minister of the Government of Kerala. The incumbent Minister for Welfare of Backward Classes is K. A. Thulasi.

The department is administratively headed by a Secretary to Government, an IAS Officer, assisted by joint secretaries, deputy secretaries, under secretaries and other clerical staffs.

== Functions ==
The department is tasked with overall welfare of backward classes in the state. It includes reservation of seats for backward classes in educational institutions, reservation of jobs for backward classes in public services and public sector undertakings, classification and identification of communities as Backward Classes, etc. The department is also tasked with administrative matters of National Commission for Backward Classes, Kerala State Commission for Backward Classes and Directorate of Backward Classes Development.

== Sub-Departments ==
- Directorate of Backward Classes Development

== Autonomous institutions ==
- Kerala State Backward Classes Development Corporation
- Kerala State Development Corporation for Christian Converts from SC and the Recommended Communities Ltd.
- Kerala State Commission for Backward Classes

== See also ==
- Scheduled Caste and Scheduled Tribes Development Department (Kerala)
- Government of Kerala
