= Department of Power (Kerala) =

Indian state government department

Power Department
- Emblem of Kerala

Department overview
- Jurisdiction: Government of Kerala
- Headquarters: Kerala Government Secretariat, Thiruvananthapuram
- Annual budget: ₹346.6088 crore (US$36 million) (2026–27, revised)
- Minister responsible: Sunny Joseph, Minister for Electricity
- Department executive: M G Rajamanickam I.A.S, Secretary to Government (Power)
- Child agencies: ANERT; Kerala Energy Management Center; Kerala State Electricity Board Electrical Inspectorate Department
- Website: Department of Power

The Department of Power is an administrative department of the Government of Kerala. The department is responsible for policy formulation, planning, and oversight relating to electricity generation, transmission, and distribution in the state of Kerala. It has its headquarters in Thiruvananthapuram.

== Leadership ==
The Power Department is headed by the Minister for Electricity, and incumbent minister is Sunny Joseph.

Administratively, the department is headed by an Additional Chief Secretary to Government, an IAS Officer. The current power secretary is Puneet Kumar IAS. The Additional Chief Secretary to Government is assisted by additional secretaries, joint secretaries, deputy secretaries and under secretaries, and other secretariate staffs.

The Kerala State Electricity Board (KSEB) is headed by a chairman and managing director (CMD), and current CMD is Mir Mohammad Ali IAS.

== Functions ==
The department is responsible for policy formulation and implementation related to electricity generation and distribution, and coordinates various public-sector undertakings in the field of energy. The department is tasked with the administration of various laws and regulations related to energy and electricity in the state.

== Line departments and public sector undertakings ==
- Kerala State Electricity Board (KSEB)
- Electricity Inspectorate Department, Kerala
- Agency for New and Renewable Energy Research and Technology (ANERT), Kerala
- Kerala State Electricity Regulatory Commission]
- Kerala Electricity Ombudsman
- Energy Management Center, Kerala

=== Kerala State Electricity Board ===
The Kerala State Electricity Board (KSEB) functions under the administrative control of the department and is responsible for power generation, transmission, and distribution across the state.

=== Renewable energy ===
The Agency for Non-conventional Energy and Rural Technology (ANERT) is the nodal agency for promoting renewable energy and energy conservation in Kerala.

=== Electrical Inspectorate Department ===
The main functions of the Department of Electrical Inspectorate is to ensure safety of all electrical installations as per the provisions of section 53 of The Electricity Act, 2003. The Electrical Inspectorate investigate electrical accidents. The Electrical Inspectorate Department is headed by a Chief Electrical Inspector, and has its headquarters in Thiruvananthapuram.

== See also ==
- Government of Kerala
- Kerala State Electricity Board
- Agency for Non-conventional Energy and Rural Technology
- Ministry of Power (India)
- Energy policy of India
