= Kongad-II =

- village
- Country: India
- State: Kerala
- District: Palakkad

Population (2011)
  - Total: 15,352

Languages
  - Official: Malayalam, English
- Time zone: UTC+5:30 (IST)
- PIN: 6XXXXX
- Vehicle registration: KL-

Kongad-II is a village in the Palakkad district, state of Kerala, India. Along with Kongad-I, it is administered by the Kongad gram panchayat.

== Demographics ==
As of 2011 India census, Kongad-II had a population of 15,352 with 7,481 males and 7,871 females.
