= Keralasseri =

Keralassery
- Village
- Location in Kerala, India Keralassery (India)
- Coordinates: 10°49′30″N 76°30′0″E
- Country: India
- State: Kerala
- District: Palakkad

Government
  - Body: Keralassery Grama Panchayat

Area
  - Total: 23.97 km^{2} (9.25 sq mi)

Population (2011)
  - Total: 15,022
  - Density: 626.7/km^{2} (1,623/sq mi)

Languages
  - Official: Malayalam, English
- Time zone: UTC+5:30 (IST)
- PIN: 678641
- Nearest city: Palakkad
- Lok Sabha constituency: Palakkad

Keralasseri (also spelt Keralassery) is a Grama Panchayat and a Village in Palakkad district, Kerala, India. Keralasseri is a small village consisting of temples, mosques and churches.

== Demographics ==
As of 2001 India census, Keralasseri had a population of 14,755 with 6,972 males and 7,783 females.

== Places of worship ==
1. Kallapadi Shiva Temple (the temple with two deities Shiva and Vishnu with equal importance)
2. Kootala bhagavathy Temple: Pattu at Koottala Bagavathi Temple is famous. April May is a festival season here.,
3. Karadimala Bhagavathy Temple
4. Ayanari Ayyappa Temple: Ayanari Ayyappa temple is a temple dedicated to Lord Ayyappa.
5. Yakkikav Durga Devi Temple
6. Keralassery Mosque.
7. St.Mary's Church

== Places of Education ==
1. Higher Secondary School Keralassery
2. A.U.P School Keralassery
3. Thadukkasseri Holly Family AUP School, Keralassery
4. NEUP School Keralassery
