= Kerala State Electricity Board =

Electricity Supplier Of Kerala

Kerala State Electricity Board Limited

- KSEB Headquarters in Thiruvananthapuram
- Type: Public Sector Company
- Industry: Electricity generation, transmission, distribution
- Founded: 7 March 1957; 69 years ago
- Headquarters: Thiruvananthapuram, Kerala, India
- Area served: Kerala, India
- Key people: M G Rajamanickam, IAS (Chairman & managing director)
- Products: Electricity
- Services: Electricity transmission; Electricity distribution
- Owner: Government of Kerala
- Number of employees: 35,000
- Parent: Power Department, Government of Kerala
- Website: kseb.in

Kerala State Electricity Board (KSEB) is an Indian public sector undertaking under the Government of Kerala that generates, transmits and distributes electricity in the state. Established in 1957, the agency comes under the authority of the Power Department. It has been registered under the Companies Act, 1956 in January 2011.

== History ==
The history of electricity in the state is around one century old. The first effort in this direction was a private endeavour. Electricity was first brought to the state by a British company – the Kannan Devan Hill Produce Company, Munnar. The first generating station of the state was set up on the right bank of a tributary of River Periyar in 1906. It was a hydroelectric project and the tributary called Mudirappuzha continues to be the site for a large numbers of hydroelectric projects in the state.

Attempts at power generation for meeting local needs through thermal plants were making progress in several parts of the state between 1929 and 1941. The Trivandrum Electric Supply which supplied power for street and domestic lighting and for lights and fans in government offices was the earliest of such efforts. In 1927, a Thermal Power Station was established under government ownership at Thiruvananthapuram for the production of electrical energy on commercial lines. Three oil engine generators, of a capacity of 65 kW each, were installed and commercial production started in 1929. This station was located at Thampanoor at Thiruvananthapuram. An Electrical Wing under the State Public Works Department was entrusted with the administration of the scheme.

The next significant development was the formation of a separate department for electricity in 1932 by His Highness Sri Chithirathirunal Maharaja and his Diwan Sir C P Ramaswami Iyer. The formation of the Electricity Department paved the way for notable developments in the field. Thermal generating stations were set up at Kollam, Kottayam and Nagercoil (now in Tamil Nadu) in 1934. By that time, the possibilities of hydroelectric generation attracted the attention of the technologists and authorities.

The first attempt at generation on a commercial scale was made in 1935-36 when the Government of Cochin issued a licence to the Cochin State Power and Light Corporation for electrification of the towns of Ernakulam and Thrissur and the suburbs.

Kerala being a land of mountains and rivers presented a fertile field for hydroelectric generation. The vast potential for hydroelectric generation in the state prompted the state authorities to take steps to establish stations for hydroelectric generation. The first of these ventures was the Pallivasal Hydroelectric Project, the construction of which was started in 1933. The first stage of the project was commissioned in 1940. Its capacity was 13.5 MW. By that time, a comparable electric transmission network had also been completed with 66 kV substations at Alappuzha, Mavelikkara, Kothamangalam, Kundara, Kalamasserry, Viyyur, Aluva, and Thiruvananthapuram, which were also commissioned in 1940 during April and May. With the commissioning of Pallivasal project in 1940, the Kannan Devan Hills Produce Company closed down its plant. Supply from the Pallivasal hydro-electric project in Travancore began in 1942, and by 1945-46, the entire requirements of Ernakulam and Mattanchery were met from this source.

The Kerala state Electricity board started functioning under the direction of a newly formed Kerala government on 31 March 1957. The first governing body consisted of 5 members, and was headed by chairman K P Sreedhara Kaymal. The staff of the erstwhile Department of Electricity of the Thiru-Kochi state were transferred to the KSEB.

At the time of its inception, in 1958, the KSEB had an installed capacity of 109.5 MW, with a total annual internal generation of 441.35 MU. Over the years, as demand increased, the board has imported power from neighbouring states and private entities. As per the Central Electricity Act 2003, KSEB was converted to Kerala State Electricity Board Limited in 2014. The original KSEB was dissolved and its assets and liabilities transferred to the government initially and then transferred to the newly formed company KSEB Limited.

In 2015, KSEB commissioned its first solar power plant, marking the beginning of its formal entry into grid‑connected solar generation. In 2016, the introduction of open access for large consumers led to a significant reduction in revenue for the utility, as several industrial users shifted to alternate suppliers. The same year, the state recorded a rare surplus‑power situation, prompting KSEB to explore options for selling excess electricity to other states. KSEB also expanded its solar initiatives in 2016 by promoting rooftop and small‑scale solar installations as part of its broader transition to renewable energy. In 2017, KSEB workers staged a strike alleging excessive workload and continuous duty hours, highlighting internal labour‑management tensions within the organisation. The same year, KSEB introduced a performance appraisal system aimed at improving accountability and service delivery across its operational units.

In 2018, the utility reported concerns over business attrition and revenue loss due to changing consumption patterns and increased competition in the power sector. Later that year, following the widespread damage caused by Cyclone Gaja in Tamil Nadu, KSEB deployed a 400‑member team of engineers and line workers to assist in restoring electricity infrastructure in the affected districts.

In 2022, Kerala commissioned what was described as India's largest floating solar power plant, adding significant renewable capacity to the state's grid and demonstrating the state's adoption of innovative solar technologies. In 2023, KSEB began exploring power‑swap arrangements with utilities in Punjab and Uttar Pradesh to meet peak summer demand more efficiently and reduce dependence on short‑term market purchases. Kerala also received national attention for its progress in integrating renewable energy into the grid, with KSEB implementing advanced forecasting, scheduling, and grid‑balancing mechanisms to accommodate rising solar and wind generation.

In 2024, KSEB commissioned two new hydel projects, adding 100 MW to Kerala's power system and expanding the state's hydroelectric generation portfolio. In 2025, KSEB employees held statewide protests over wage revision, dearness allowance, and pension‑related issues, reflecting ongoing labour concerns within the organisation. The same year, farmers in parts of Thrissur district raised concerns over water shortages affecting paddy cultivation, alleging that KSEB's reservoir‑management practices contributed to the crisis.

== Organizational structure ==
The Kerala State Electricity Board, constituted by the Government of Kerala, by order dated 7 March 1957, under the Electricity (Supply) Act, 1948 is in the business of Generation, Transmission and Distribution of electricity and strives to provide quality electricity at an affordable cost to all classes of consumers in the state of Kerala. Kerala State Electricity Board commenced functioning on 31 March 1957 afternoon as per order no. EL1-6475/56/PW dated 7 March 1957 of the Kerala State Government. It had 5 members with K. P. Sreedharan Nair as chairman. All the staff belonging to the erstwhile Electricity Department was transferred to the Board. The 'Board' consisting of the chairman and the Members is the Supreme Governing Body.

The State Government by their notification EL3-9345 dated 21 February 1958 constituted the State Electricity Consultative Council under section 16 of the Electricity Supply Act. The Council functions as a consultative body and the Board is required to place before the council the annual financial statement and supplementary statements, if any, before submitting such statements to the State Government. The 'Board' consisting of the chairman and seven members is the Supreme Governing Body. The Government of Kerala and KSE Board issued orders for the restructuring of KSE Board into profit centers in April 2002. Members head the profit centers. There is a Corporate Office to coordinate and control the activities of the Board.

=== Board of Directors ===
Board of Directors – Kerala State Electricity Board Limited (KSEBL)
Name	Designation
Sri. Minhaj Alam	Chairman & Managing Director
Sri. Sajeev G	Director (Generation - Electrical, Civil, REES, SOURA)
Sri. Sivadas S	Director (Transmission & System Operation) (Full Additional Charge)
Sri. P Surendra	Director (Distribution & Supply Chain Management)
Sri. Biju R	Director (Finance)
Sri. P Surendra	Director (HRM, Sports, Welfare, Safety & Quality Assurance)
Sri. Puneet Kumar	Additional Chief Secretary, Power Department (Ex-officio Director)
Sri. K.R. Jyothilal	Additional Chief Secretary, Finance Department (Ex-officio Director)
Adv. V Murugadas	Independent Director
Prof. Arun Kumar	Independent Director

Since the enactment of the Electricity Act, 2003, KSEB has been functioning as the State Transmission Utility (STU) and a distribution licensee w.e.f 10 December 2004 under section 172(a) of the Electricity Act, 2003. The Central Government had approved the continuation of KSEB as a State Transmission Utility & Licensee only up to 24 September 2008. In exercise of the powers conferred under sub-sections (1), (2), (5), (6) and (7) of section 131 and section 133 of the Electricity Act 2003 (Central Act 36 of 2003) the Government of Kerala had issued notification vide G.O. (MS) No.37/2008/PD, Dated, Thiruvananthapuram, 25 September 2008 for the purpose of vesting of functions, properties, interests, rights, obligations and liabilities of the Kerala State Electricity Board in the State Government on such terms as agreed to by the Kerala State Electricity Board and the State Government and revesting thereof by the State Government in a Corporate entity and also for the transfer of Personnel of the Board to the Corporate entity and for determining the terms and conditions on which such transfers and vesting shall be made. Accordingly, with effect from 25 September 2008, all the functions, properties and all interests, rights in properties, all rights, and liabilities of the Board are vested in the State Government. The Kerala State Electricity Board Limited has been incorporated under the Companies Act, 1956 on 14 January 2011 and started operations as an independent company with effect from 1 November 2013. The original KSEB was dissolved and its assets and liabilities were transferred from government to the newly formed company KSEB Limited.

== Generation ==
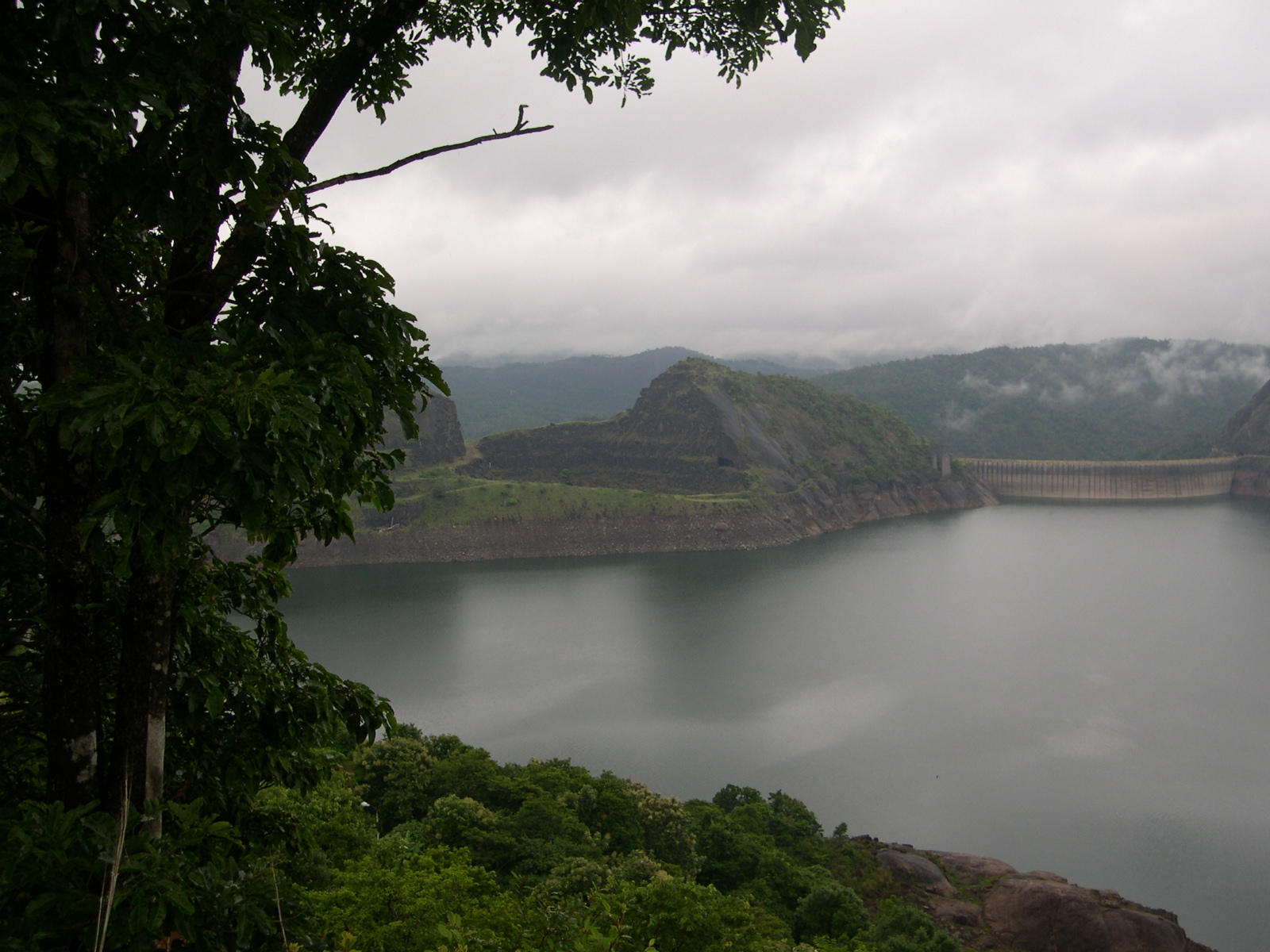
The Idukki Dam

KSEB Ltd has 31 hydro-electric projects, seven solar projects, two diesel power plants and one wind farm. Power generation is also undertaken by Captive Mode Projects, Independent Power Mode Projects & Co-generation mode projects other than KSEBL. About 25% of the energy requirement is being met from hydel plants owned and operated by KSEBL. As of December 2019, the total installed capacity was 2823.01 MW and KSEB commissioned two new hydel projects, adding 100 MW to the state grid in 2024.

The below list contains power generation projects in Kerala owned by KSEB, Captive Mode Projects, Independent Power Mode Projects and co-generation mode projects.

=== Hydroelectric projects ===
Name	Location	Capacity (MW)	Year opened
Idukki Dam	Idukki	780	1976
Idamalayar Dam	Ernakulam district	75	1985
Sholayar		54	1966
Kuttiadi		225	1972
Peringalkuthu Dam		36	1957
Peringalkuthu Left Bank Extension		16	1999
Pallivasal	Idukki	37.5	1940
Sengulam		48	1954
Sabarigiri	Pathanamthitta	340	1966
Panniar		32	1963
Neriamangalam		77.5	1961
Lower Periyar		180	1997
Kakkad		50	1999
Kallada		15	1994
Peppara		3	2015
Madupetty		2	
Malampuzha		2.5	2011
Chembukadavu		6.45	2003
Urumi		6.15	2004
Malankara		10.5	1994
Lower Meenmutty		3.5	2006
Kuttiady tail race		3.75	2008
Poozhithode		4.8	2011
Ranni-Perunadu		4	2012
Peechi		1.25	2013
Vilangad		7.5	2014
Chimini		2.5	2015
Adyanpara		3.5	2015
Barapole		15	2016
Vellathuval		3.6	2016
Peruthenaruvi		6	2017
Maniyar		12	
Kuthungal		21	2000
Ullunkal		7	2018
Iruttukanam		4.5	2010
Karikkayam		10.5	2009
Meenvallom		3	2014
Pathankayam		8	2017

=== Fossil fuel projects ===
Name	Location	Capacity (MW)	Year opened
Brahmapuram Diesel Power Plant	Kochi	106.6	1997
Kozhikode Diesel Power Project	Nallalam	128	2000
Philips Carbon Black Limited		10	
Rajiv Gandhi Combined Cycle Power Plant	Kayamkulam	359.58	1998
MPS Steel Castings Pvt. Ltd.		10.00	

=== Wind farms ===
Name	Location	Capacity (MW)	Year opened
Kanjikode Wind Farm		2.025	1995
Malayala Manorama	Palakkad	10	2019
Ramakkelmedu		14.25	2008
Agali		18.60	
Ahalia		8.40	2016
Inox	Kanjikode	16	2017
Kosamattom		1	

=== Solar projects ===
Name	Location	Capacity (MW)	Year opened
Kanjikode		1.00	2015
Edayar		1.25	2016
Kollengode		1.00	
Barapole		4.00	2016
Muvattupuzha		1.25	2016
Pothencode	Andoorkonam, Thiruvananthapuram	2.00	2016
Cochin International Airport Limited	Nedumbassery	29.03	2015
Hindalco		1.00	2016
Kochi Metro Rail Limited	Muttom	2.67	2017
ANERT	Kuzhalmandam	2.00	2017
Renewable Power Corporation of Kerala Limited	Ambalathara	50.00	

== Transmission ==
The Kerala power system grid is connected to the Southern Region Transmission system through 400 kV double circuit lines. They are

- Udumalpet – Madakkathara line
- Tirunelveli – Trivandrum line
- Mysore – Kozhikode (Areekode) line
- Tirunelveli - Kochi line

A 2000 MW HVDC Station has commissioned by Power Grid Corporation of India Ltd. at Madakkathara as part of Raigarh-Pugalur-Thrissur HVDC Project. This is the first HVDC Project in Kerala and the fourth project in South India after Kolar, Vizag and Pugalur. The project was inaugurated by Prime Minister Narendra Modi in February 2021.

There are 6 major inter-state transmission lines at 220 kV level and 110 kV level.

The 220 kV lines are:

- Kaniyampetta – Kadakola (single circuit)
- Idukki – Udumalpet (single circuit)
- Sabarigiri – Theni (single circuit)
- Edamon – Tirunelveli (double circuit)

The 110 kV lines are:

- Parassala – Kuzhithura and
- Manjeswaram – Konake.

The major substations include five 400 kV substations, and 17 220 kV substations. The main grid comprises the 220 kV systems. The transmission sector of KSEB comprises two zones namely North and South. The State Load Dispatch Centre (SLDC) located at Kalamassery.

Capacity	No. substations	Line length in circuit km	Reliability index
400 kV	5^{*}	378^{**}	99.96
220 kV	17	2701.38	97.75
110 kV	129	4004	98.25
66 kV	83	2387	97.86
33 kV	114	1430	92.99

400 kV substations at Pallippuram – Thiruvananthapuram, Pallikkara – Kochi, Palakkad, and Kozhikode are owned by PGCIL, while 400 kV substation at Madakkathara, Thrissur, is owned by KSEB. 400 kV substation, Madakkathara is the first 400 kV substation in Kerala.

== Distribution ==
KSEB Ltd distributes electricity in the State of Kerala except in the administrative region of Thrissur Municipal Corporation and Munnar (Kannan Devan Hills). For operational conveniences the distribution wing is divided into four zones: South, Central, North and North Malabar.

== Electricity tariff ==
Kerala State Electricity Board tariff consists of different components. The charges levied on consumers include fixed charges, meter rent, energy charges, fuel surcharges, electricity duty and applicable local taxes.

=== Low Tension Tariff ===
KSEB follows a slab system in which a consumer using up to 250 units per month will have a telescopic tariff. This means that the first 50 units will be charged at a lower rate, with the rates increasing progressively for subsequent 50 units. After 250 units, the billing will be "non-telescopic", which means the slab rate will be applicable for the entire electricity consumed. The following table shows the electricity tariff for domestic consumers

==== Tariff for monthly consumption (up to 250 units) ====
Consumption slab	Fixed charges (Rs)	Electricity tariff (Rs/unit)
0-40	0	1.5
0-50	50	3.35
51-100	85	4.25
101-150	105	5.35
151-200	140	7.20
201-250	160	8.50

For three-phase customers having a monthly consumption up to 100 units, the fixed charges are set as Rs 130 and Rs 235 for up to 250 units.

==== Tariff for monthly consumption (above 250 units) ====
Consumption slab	Fixed charges (Rs)	Electricity tariff (Rs/unit)
0-300	220	6.75
0-350	240	7.60
0-400	260	7.95
0-500	285	8.25
500-	310	9.20

For three-phase customers the fixed charges are set as Rs 250 for consumers having a monthly consumption up to 350 units, Rs 260 for up to 400 units, Rs 260 for up to 400 units and Rs 310 for consumption above 500 units.

=== High Tension and Extra High Tension Tariff ===
KSEB has different tariff rates for its HT and EHT Consumers.

== See also ==
- List of electricity organisations in India
- Electricity sector in India
- List of power stations in India
