= Sure Chill Technology =

Cooling technology used in refrigerators

Sure Chill Technology is a cooling technology that is currently being used in medical refrigerators, but is thought to have wider potential in the future for domestic refrigerators and beverage coolers. According to BBC, the refrigerator's temperature 'can stay at 4°C for more than 10 days without power, and is used mainly in Africa' to store vaccines and other medical supplies. It can be powered by electricity or solar, and uses the physics of water to store energy, thus not relying on batteries.

In 2013, the technology that uses an ice-mass to maintain refrigerator temperature without power won a $100,000 research award from the Bill and Melinda Gates Foundation. In 2014, the company was awarded a further $1.4 million from the Gates Foundation to develop a life-saving vaccine cooler as part of the foundation’s goal to eliminate preventable diseases worldwide.

== Inventor ==
Ian Tansley from Tywyn, Wales, invented the technology with extensive experience in cooling technologies. Tansley spent many years working with vaccine refrigerators in some of the world’s most inhospitable places. A constant frustration for him was their dependence on re-chargeable batteries, which were costly, unreliable and hard to replace in remote areas.

== Advisory board ==
In 2013, both Sir Richard Feachem and Sir John Houghton were announced as Advisory Board members to the company. Sir Richard stated, “It is my view that Sure Chill Technology will make a huge contribution to childhood vaccination programmes worldwide, especially in poorer communities.” Whilst Sir John stated, “Sure Chill Technology has the potential to improve living conditions and healthcare of populations in some of the poorest countries, and to lessen the impact of global warming on mankind. There can be no greater purpose.”
