= Brahmapuram Diesel Power Plant =

Building in India

- Country: India
- Location: Kochi
- Coordinates: 10°00′N 76°22′E
- Status: Operational
- Commission date: February 1997
- Owner: Kerala State Electricity Board
- Operator: Kerala load Distribution Centre(KLDC)

Thermal power station
- Primary fuel: Diesel

Power generation
- Units operational: 5 x 21.32 MW
- Nameplate capacity: 106.6 MW; Planned: 400 MW

Brahmapuram Diesel Power Plant is a 106.6 MW public sector power station in Kochi, India run by the Kerala State Electricity Board, commissioned in 1997. It is controlled by Kerala load Distribution Center(KLDC).

== Overview ==
The plant is based on large-bore 4 stroke diesel engines from MAN B&W, Germany. The plant has a total of five machines with capacity to generate 21.32 MW power each. Though the station is still known as diesel power plant, it has been using low sulphur heavy stock (LSHS) -- a residual fuel processed from indigenous crude, provided by IOC—in place of diesel. LSHS is in semisolid form. It is heated by steam to make it liquid form. When melts it becomes the same form of diesel. The transfer of diesel to LSHS is done by a three valve mechanism(first diesel, then a mixture of diesel and LSHS, then LSHS).

- Number of Cylinders : 18
- Cylinder configuration : V type
- Engine capacity : 18000 cc/cylinder
- Engine power : 30,000 bhp
- Fuel used : Diesel (for starting), LSHS(low sulphur heavy stock)

=== Electrical section ===
The engine is coupled with an alternator. The alternator consists of a stator and a rotor and the entire assembly is under one case. Switchgear of 220 kV, 25000 A is used to control the supply. Then the load is reduced to 11 kV for transmission, with the help of step down transformers

It uses direct current for all its applications (easy to store). The cost of power production at the existing diesel plant at Brahmapuram is Rs. 13 per kWh, considering the cost the three machines are operated only when it is absolutely necessary. The power produced from here is connected to the KSEB grid and supplied to the consumers in the state of Kerala.

== Expansion ==
The Kerala State Electricity Board has decided to set up a 400MW combined cycle power generation facility on the premises of the existing power plant at Brahmapuram, using natural gas as the feedstock. GAIL will be supplying LNG for the new power plant from the Petronet LNG Terminal. The power plant is likely to be completed by early 2017.

== See also ==
- Bhramapuram landfill
