= Sunny Joseph (politician) =

Indian politician

- സണ്ണി ജോസഫ്‌
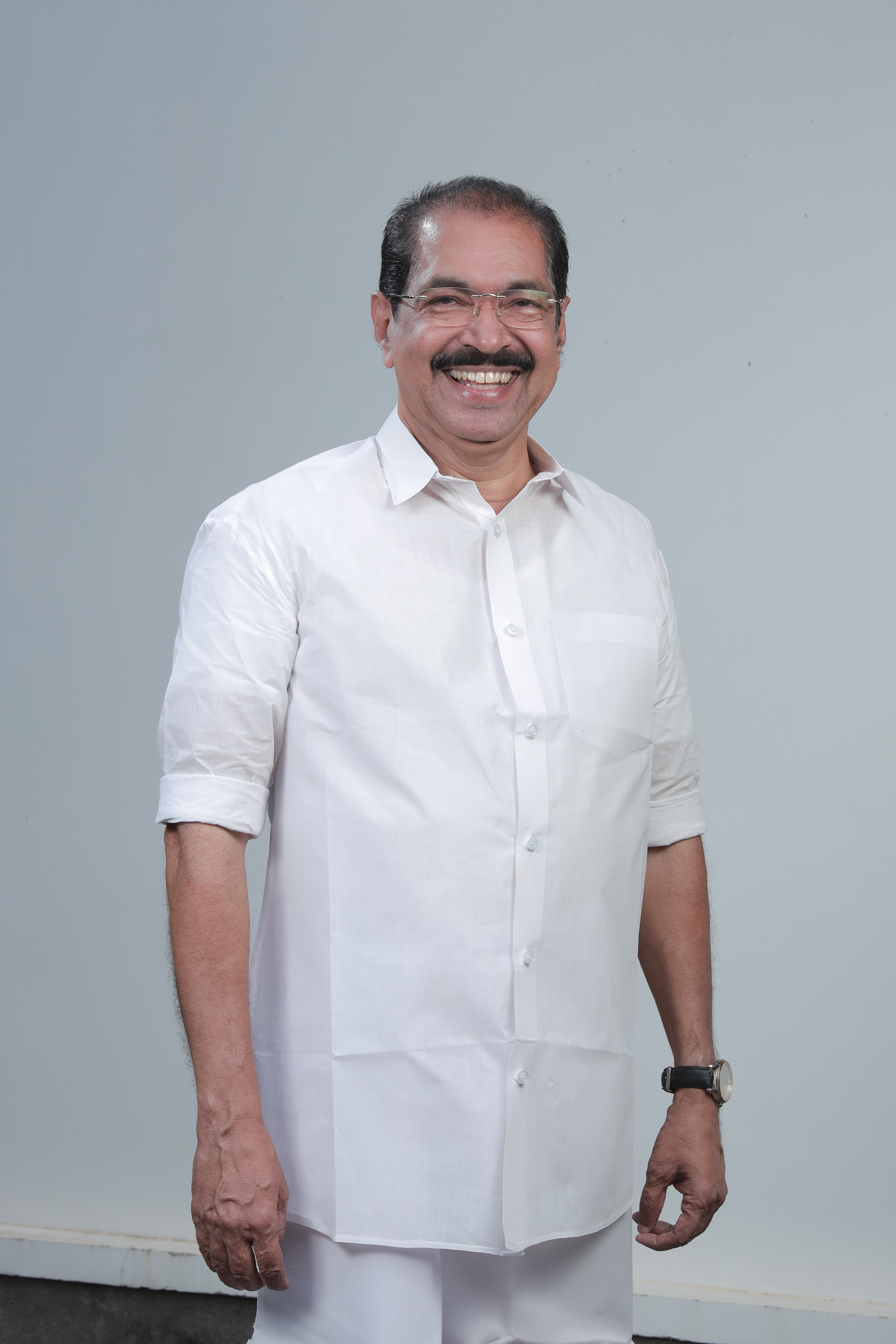

Minister for Electricity, Environment, and Parliamentary Affairs, Government of Kerala
- Incumbent
- Assumed office 18 May 2026
- Governor: Om Prakash Mathur
- Chief Minister: V.D. Satheesan
- Preceded by: K. Krishnankutty (Electricity); Pinarayi Vijayan (Environment); M.B. Rajesh (Parliamentary Affairs)

President Kerala Pradesh Congress Committee
- Incumbent
- Assumed office 8 May 2025
- Preceded by: K. Sudhakaran

Member of Kerala Legislative Assembly
- Incumbent
- Assumed office 13 May 2011
- Preceded by: K. K. Shailaja
- Constituency: Peravoor

Personal details
- Born: 18 August 1952 (age 74) Thodupuzha, Travancore–Cochin, India
- Party: Indian National Congress
- Parent(s): Joseph; Rosakutty
- Education: Bachelor of Arts; Bachelor of Law
- Alma mater: Government Law College, Kozhikode
- Profession: Advocate; Politician

Sunny Joseph (born 18 August 1952) is an Indian lawyer and politician from Kerala and is the current Minister for power in the Government of Kerala. He is the Member of the Kerala Legislative Assembly of Peravoor since May 2011.

He was born in a Syro-Malabar Catholic family as the son of Joseph and Rosakutty. Sunny is a veteran political leader of the Indian National Congress and an Advocate by profession. Currently he is the President of Kerala Pradesh Congress Committee and Chairman of United Democratic Front (UDF) Kannur District Committee.

== Political career ==
Sunny Joseph joined Congress though Kerala Students Union (KSU), the student wing of the Indian National Congress, later rising through the organizational ranks via the Youth Congress.

He was former president of the Kannur district Congress Committee (DCC). Sunny is a three-time MLA representing Peravoor constituency in the district. Peravoor constituency had been a Congress stronghold since 1977. However the party lost the seat in the 2006 assembly election to senior CPI(M) leader K.K. Shailaja.

In the 2011 assembly elections, Sunny Joseph was chosen for the seat by Congress high command, which he won with 48.1% votes against K.K. Shailaja’s 45.1 percent. Sunny never lost the seat since then.

Sunny Joseph was appointed as the president of the Kerala Pradesh Congress Committee (KPCC) in May 2025 as part of a leadership reshuffle in the Congress party.
