= Karakurissi =

- village
- Location in Kerala, India Karakurissi (India)
- Coordinates: 10°58′0″N 76°29′30″E
- Country: India
- State: Kerala
- District: Palakkad

Government
  - Body: Karakurussi

Population (2011)
  - Total: Almost 32,000

Languages
  - Official: Malayalam, English
- Time zone: UTC+5:30 (IST)
- PIN: 678595
- Telephone code: 04924-249XXX
- Vehicle registration: KL-50 & KL-09
- Nearest city: Mannarkkad
- Lok Sabha constituency: Palakkad
- Vidhan Sabha constituency: Kongad
- Civic agency: Karakurussi
- Climate: moderate temperature (Köppen)
- Website: lsgkerala.in/karakurussipanchayat/%0Awww.mannarkkad.com/Karakurussi

Karakurussi is a village in the Palakkad district, state of Kerala, India. It is administered by its own gram panchayat.

== Location ==
Karakurussi is located approximately 4 km from the National Highway 966 which connects Palakkad, Malappuram and Kozhikode districts headquarters of Kerala. It is also 32 km from the district headquarters. It comes under the Mannarkkad Taluk.

== Demographics ==
As of 2011 India census, Karakurissi had a population of almost 32000.

== See also ==
- Vazhempuram
