= Kongad-I =

- village
- Country: India
- State: Kerala
- District: Palakkad

Population (2011)
  - Total: 14,808

Languages
  - Official: Malayalam, English
- Time zone: UTC+5:30 (IST)
- PIN: 678631
- Vehicle registration: KL-

Kongad-I is a village in the Palakkad district, state of Kerala, India. Along with Kongad-II, it is administered by the Kongad gram panchayat.

== Demographics ==
As of 2011 India census, Kongad-I had a population of 14,808 with 7,148 males and 7,660 females.
