= Scheduled Castes and Scheduled Tribes Development Department =

Welfare department of Kerala

Department overview
- Jurisdiction: India Kerala
- Headquarters: Thiruvananthapuram, Kerala
- Minister responsible: K. A. Thulasi, Minister for SC/ST Development
- Department executives: Dr. A Kowsigan IAS, Secretary to Government; Dr. Mithun Premraj IAS, Director (ST Development); D Dharmalashri IAS, Director (SC Development)
- Parent department: Government of Kerala
- Website: www.stdd.kerala.gov.in scdd.kerala.gov.in/index.php/eng

The Department of Scheduled Castes and Scheduled Tribes Development (SCSTDD) is an administrative department of the Government of Kerala. The department is tasked with formulating and implementing policies aimed at promoting education, employment and overall welfare for Scheduled Tribes (ST) and Scheduled Castes (SC). It has its headquarters in Thiruvananthapuram, Kerala.

== Leadership ==
The Scheduled Castes and Scheduled Tribes Development Department is overseen by the Cabinet Minister of the Government of Kerala, with civil servants such as the Secretary to Government appointed to assist in managing the department and executing its functions.

The incumbent Minister for Welfare of Scheduled Castes and Scheduled Tribes is K. A. Thulasi.

The Minister for SC & ST Development provides political leadership and policy direction for the department. The Secretary to Government (SC & ST Development) is the administrative head of the department, responsible for policy implementation and management of department's functions.

== Functions ==
- Welfare of Scheduled Castes
  - Administration of Scheduled Castes Development Department
  - Matters relating to policies, programmes and schemes for social and economic development of Scheduled Castes and their welfare
  - Administrative matters of Kerala State Development Corporation for SC/ST
  - Educational institutions for Scheduled Castes.
- Welfare of Scheduled Tribes
  - Administration of Scheduled Tribes Department
  - Matters relating to educational, social and economic development of tribals including scholarships, hostels, stipend, Balavadies, etc.

== Sub-Departments ==
- Directorate of Scheduled Castes Development
- Directorate of Scheduled Tribes Development

== Aligned institutions ==
- Kerala institute for Research Training & Development studies of Scheduled Castes and Scheduled Tribes

== See also ==
- Government of Kerala
- Department of Backward Communities Development (Kerala)
