= Kerala State Development Corporation for Christian Converts from Scheduled Castes and the Recommended Communities =

- Type: Public Sector Corporation under the Ministry for Welfare of Scheduled Castes, Scheduled Tribes and Backward Classes of the State Government of Kerala
- Industry: Public sector undertaking
- Founded: 1980
- Headquarters: Kottayam, Kerala, India
- Area served: Kerala
- Key people: Sri.Radhakrishnan, (Minister for SC, ST, BC, Parliamentary Affairs & Devaswom Departments, Govt. of Kerala) Dr.Jassie Gift, (Chairman), Sri.Baburaj B, (Managing Director)
- Products: Loans and Developmental Projects
- Website: ksdc.kerala.gov.in

Kerala State Development Corporation for Christian Converts from Scheduled Castes and the Recommended Communities is a Government of Kerala undertaking located at Kottayam which provides financial help to Christian converts.

== History ==
The body was incorporated in 1980 under the Companies Act, 1956 and lists its main objectives as "to promote the comprehensive social, educational, cultural and economic upliftment and other living conditions of the Christian Converts from Scheduled Castes and the Recommended Communities".

== Welfare schemes ==
The body provides micro-financing, marketing support for various products manufactured as part of the schemes at its margin-free shops and free scholarships exclusively for students belonging to Christian converts from Scheduled Castes and the Recommended Communities.

In 2010, A.K. Balan the Minister of Welfare of Scheduled Castes/Scheduled Tribes and Backward Classes launched a loan waiver scheme which waived ₹159 crore of loans for one lakh people.

== Constitutional validity ==
Critics have labelled the body in "complete violation of the Constitution" for discriminating on religious grounds violating secular constitution of India.
