= Radha Raghavan =

Indian politician (born 1961)

Member of the Kerala Legislative Assembly
- In office 2001 – 5 July 2005
- Preceded by: K. Raghavan Master
- Succeeded by: K. C. Kunhiraman
- Constituency: North Wayanad

Member of the Kerala Legislative Assembly
- In office 1996–2001
- Preceded by: K. Raghavan Master
- Succeeded by: K. Raghavan Master
- Constituency: North Wayanad

Personal details
- Born: June 3, 1961 (age 65) Naikketty, Kerala, India
- Other party: Democratic Indira Congress (Karunakaran)
- Spouse: K. Raghavan Master
- Children: 3
- Parents: Paithal (father); Nani (mother)
- Occupation: Politician; social worker
- Known for: Tribal and marginalized communities welfare work

Radha Raghavan (born 3 June 1961) is an Indian National Congress politician from Kerala. She has been a member of the Kerala Legislative Assembly for two terms and resigned from her second one.

== Early life ==
Radha Raghavan was born on 3 June 1961 and attended school till secondary level.

== Career ==
Raghavan has been the Madhya Varjana Samithi's Kerala President and the chairperson of Adivasi Vikas Parishad beside being a member of the working committee of Democratic India Congress. She is affiliated to the Indian National Congress (INC) party. Following the death of her husband, an INC politician, the party decided to field her in the North Wayanad constituency reserved for members of the scheduled tribes. She won the election conducted for the Tenth Kerala Legislative Assembly. She was re-elected for another term but resigned while being an MLA. Raghavan has gained recognition for her social work aimed at uplifting the condition of marginalized communities; scheduled castes and scheduled tribes.

== Personal life ==
With her husband K. Raghavan Master she has one son and two daughters.
