= Kongad Gram Panchayat =

Kongad
- Town
- Location in Kerala, India Kongad (India)
- Coordinates: 10°51′15″N 76°31′19″E
- Country: India
- State: Kerala
- District: Palakkad

Government
  - Type: Panchayati Raj (India)
  - Body: Kongad Panchayat

Area
  - Total: 35 km^{2} (14 sq mi)

Population (2011)
  - Total: 30,020
  - Density: 860/km^{2} (2,200/sq mi)

Languages
  - Official: Malayalam, English
- Time zone: UTC+5:30 (IST)
- PIN: 678631
- Telephone code: 0491
- Vehicle registration: KL-09
- Nearest city: Palakkad
- Parliament constituency: Palakkad
- Assembly constituency: Kongad

Kongad is a town and gram panchayat in Palakkad taluk, Kerala, India. It is a local government organisation that serves the villages of Kongad-I and Kongad-II. Kongad is located about 18 km from the district headquarters Palakkad.
