= Transport in Kozhikode district =

Kozhikode district has an extensive network of road, rail and air travel services. Kozhikode city is the epicenter of the district. Vatakara, Koyilandy and Thamarassery are other transport hubs.

== Road ==
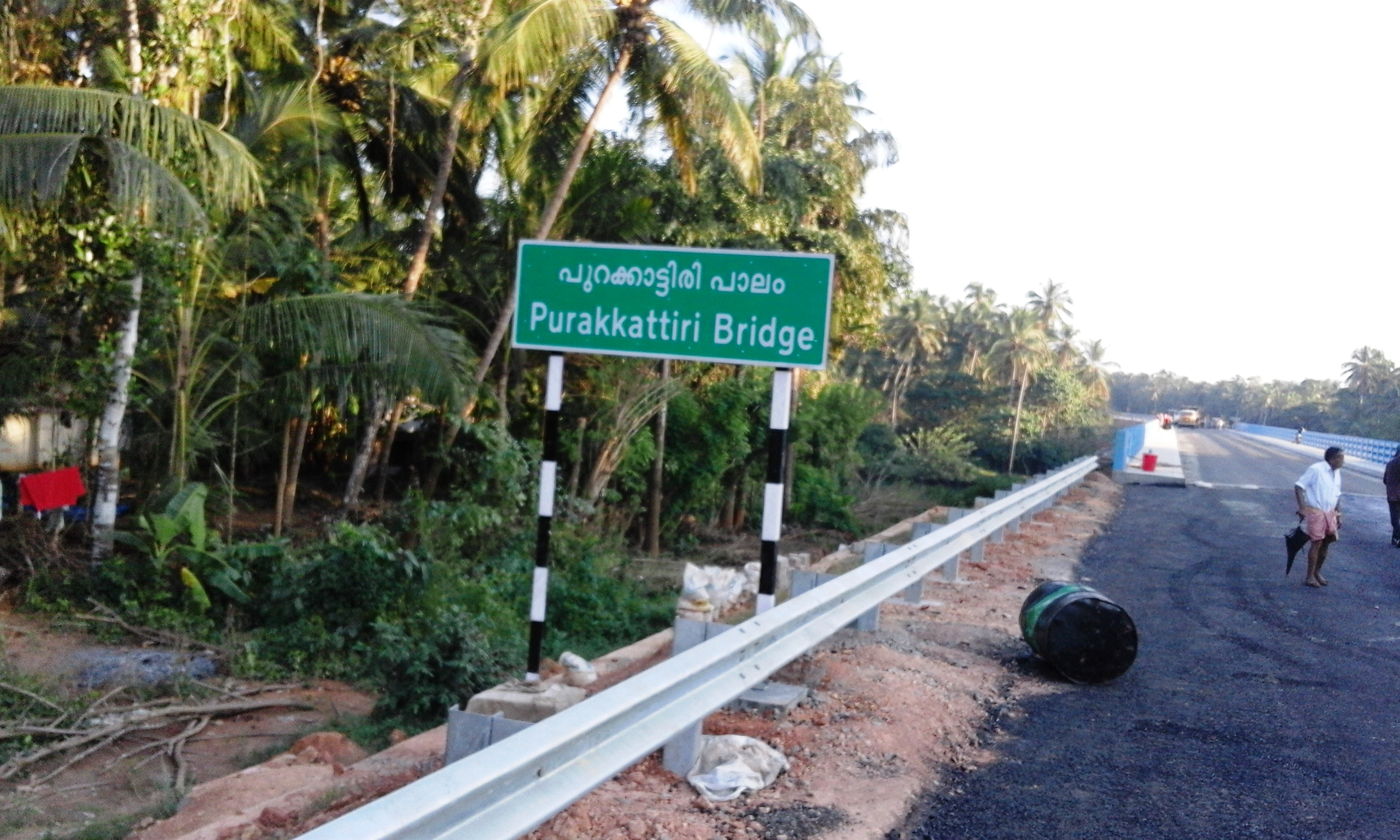
Purakkattiri Bridge built in January 2016

The city has a reasonably well-developed transport infrastructure. A large number of buses, predominantly run by individual owners, ply on the major routes within the city and to nearby locations. City buses are painted green. Kerala State Road Transport Corporation (KSRTC) runs regular services to many destinations in the state and to the neighbouring states. The city has three bus stands. All private buses to the suburban and nearby towns ply from the Palayam Bus Stand. Private buses to adjoining districts start from the Mofussil Bus Stand (one of the largest bus stand in Kerala) on Indira Gandhi Road (Mavoor Road). Buses operated by the KSRTC drive from the KSRTC bus stand on Indira Gandhi Road. KSRTC Bus Stand Kozhikode is the biggest bus stand in Kerala having a size of 36,036.47-meter square. There are also KSRTC depots in Thamarassery, Thottilpalam, Thiruvambady and Vatakara in the district.

There are two routes available to Bangalore. One is Kozhikode–Gundlupet–Mysore–Bangalore; this road is most preferred one but is very busy. Another route, less used, is Kozhikode–Gundlupet–Chamarajanagar–Kollegal–Bangalore.

Private tour operators maintain regular luxury bus services to Mumbai, Bangalore, Coimbatore, Chennai, Vellore, Ernakulam, Trivandrum, Ooty etc. and mainly operate from the Palayam area. These are usually night services.

== National Highways ==
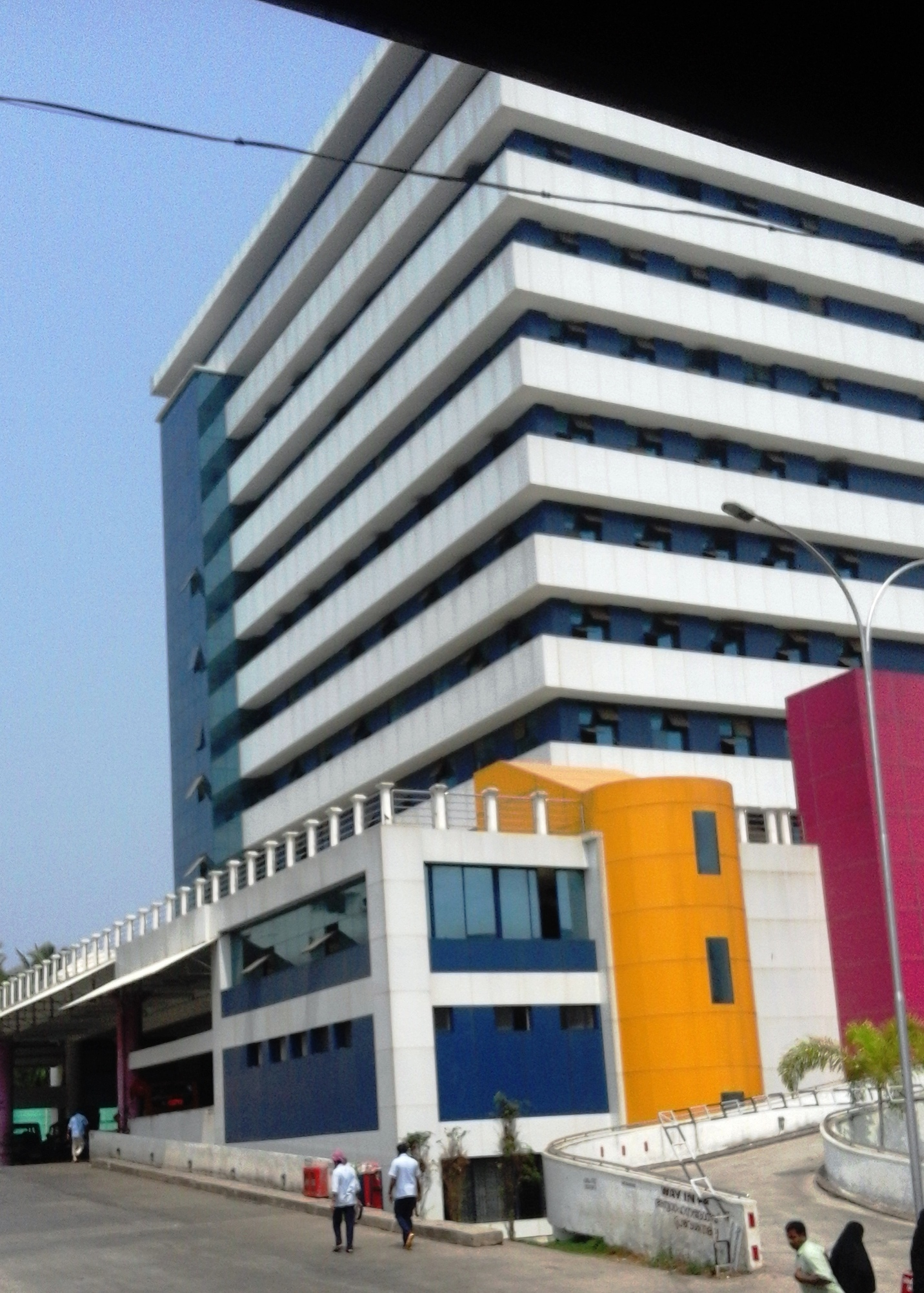
KSRTC Kozhikode

National Highway 66 connects Kozhikode to Mumbai via Mangalore, Udupi and Goa to the north and Kochi and Kanyakumari near Thiruvananthapuram to the south along the west coast of India. This highway connects the city with the other important towns like, Uppala, Kasaragod, Kanhangad, Payyanur, Taliparamba, Kannur, Thalassery, Mahe, Vadakara, Koyilandy, Vengalam, Ramanattukara, Kottakkal, Kuttippuram, Ponnani, (Guruvayoor) Chavakkad, Kodungallur, North Paravur, Edapally and proceed to Kanyakumari.

National Highway 766 connects Kozhikode to Bangalore through Kollegal in Karnataka via Tirumakudal Narsipur, Mysore, Nanjangud, Gundlupet, Sulthan Bathery, Kalpetta and Thamarassery. This highway also connects the city with the suburbs like Malaparamba, Kunnamangalam and premier institutes like IIMK, NIT-C, IISR and CWRDM.

National Highway 966 connects Kozhikode to Palakkad via Malappuram. It covers a distance of 125 kilometres (78 mi). At Ramanattukara, a suburb of Kozhikode, it joins NH 66. It also passes through towns like Kondotty, Malappuram, Perinthalmanna, and Mannarkkad. This stretch also connects the city and Calicut International Airport.

== State Highways ==
SH 54 is connecting city and Kalpetta. The highway is 99.0 kilometres (61.5 mi) long. It connects SH 38, Kuttiady, Thottilpalam, Korome, Vellamunda, Tharuvana and Padinharethara.

SH 68 starts from Kappad and ends in Adivaram. The highway passes through Atholi, Narikkuni, Padanilam, Koduvally, Omassery & Kodanchery.

SH 34 starts from Koyilandy and ends in Edavanna. The highway passes through Ulliyeri, Balussery, Thamarassery, Omassery, Mukkam & Areekode.

SH 38 starts from Puthiyangadi (Kozhikode) and ends in Chowa (Kannur). The highway passes through Pavangad, Perambra, Kuttiady, Nadapuram, Panoor, Kuthuparamba, Peralassery, Mavilayi and Kadachira.

== Rail ==
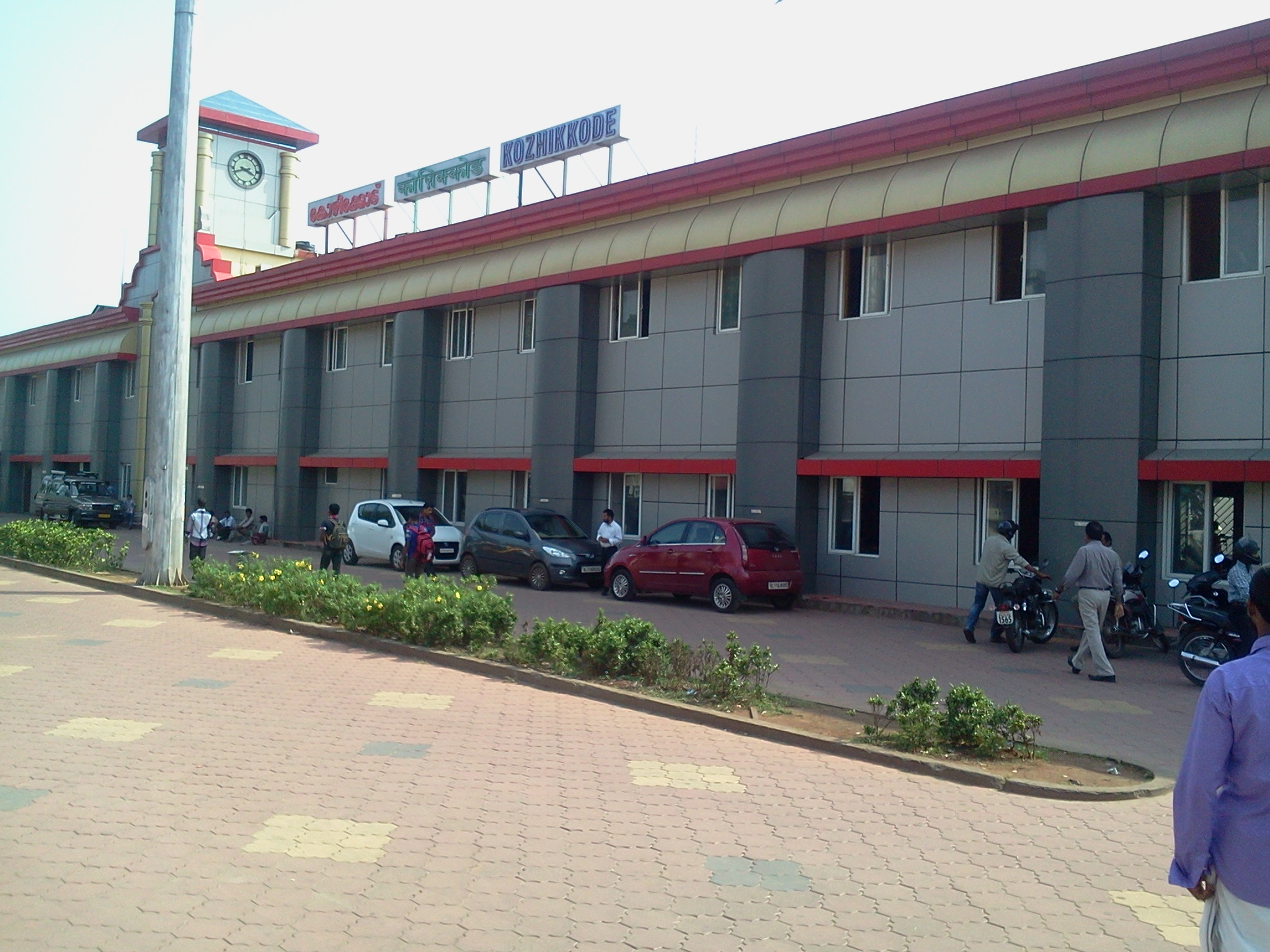
Main Entrance of Kozhikode Railway Station

The history of railways in Malabar dates back to 1861 when the first tracks were laid between Tirur and Beypore. Kozhikode railway station is the only A1 railway station in Palakkad railway division and it is situated in the Shoranur-Mangalore section. Today, Kozhikode is well connected by rail to cities like Thiruvananthapuram, Kochi, Kollam, Palakkad, Coimbatore, Katpadi, Vellore, Chennai, Bangalore, Mangalore, Mumbai, New Delhi, Vijayawada, Visakhapatnam, and Hyderabad.

== Public transport ==
=== Bus ===
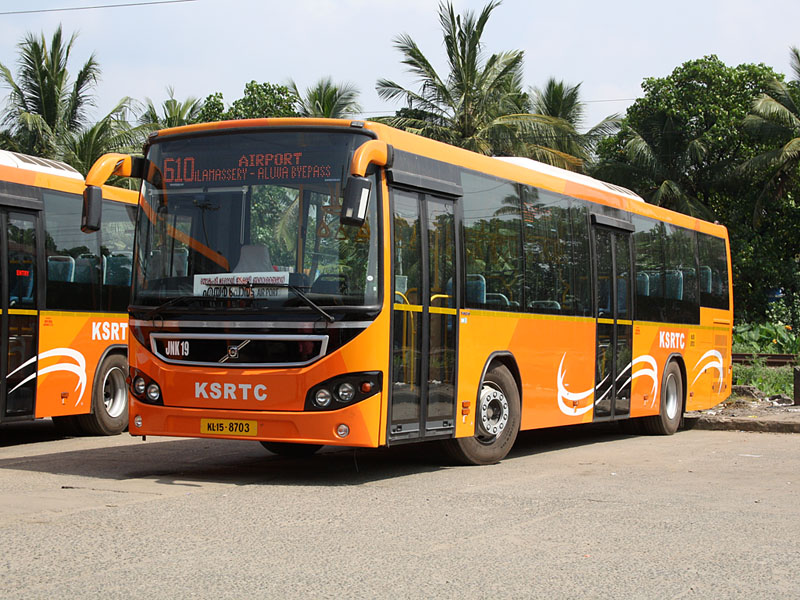
A KSRTC Volvo city service bus

Kozhikode's most-frequented public transport is Bus. Buses, predominantly run by individual owners, ply on the routes within the city and to nearby locations. The city buses are green coloured, all the city buses start and end at the Mananchira Pond area. Buses going towards the northern side of the city depart from the Post Office side of the pond, Buses going southwards departs from the Girls school side and Buses going to the eastern side departs from the Income Tax office area. The new government bus station on the Mavoor Road is the boarding point for long distance buses. This modern bus station built in 350,000 sq.ft. includes shopping and parking facilities.

KSRTC runs air-conditioned low floor buses between Kozhikode and Thiruvananthapuram. KSRTC and private buses operate frequent schedules to neighbouring areas including NIT Calicut, IIMK etc.

=== Light Metro Rail ===
Kozhikode LightMetro is a proposed mass rapid transport system (MRTS) for the city. In 2010, the State government explored the possibility of implementing a metro rail project for Kozhikode city and its suburbs. The proposal was to have a corridor connecting the Calicut Airport to the Kozhikode Medical College Hospital through the heart of the city. An inception report was submitted by a Bangalore-based consultant, Wilber Smith, on the detailed feasibility study on the prospect of implementing the Mass Rapid Transport System (MRTS) and Light Rail Transit System (LRTS) in the city. However, the project has been scrapped to be replaced by Kozhikode Monorail project. The State Cabinet then decided to form a special purpose vehicle (SPV) to implement monorail projects in Kozhikode and Thiruvananthapuram, and administrative sanction was given in October 2012, Finally, in the aspect led by the High Council met 18 May 2015 and decided to light metro.

== Air ==
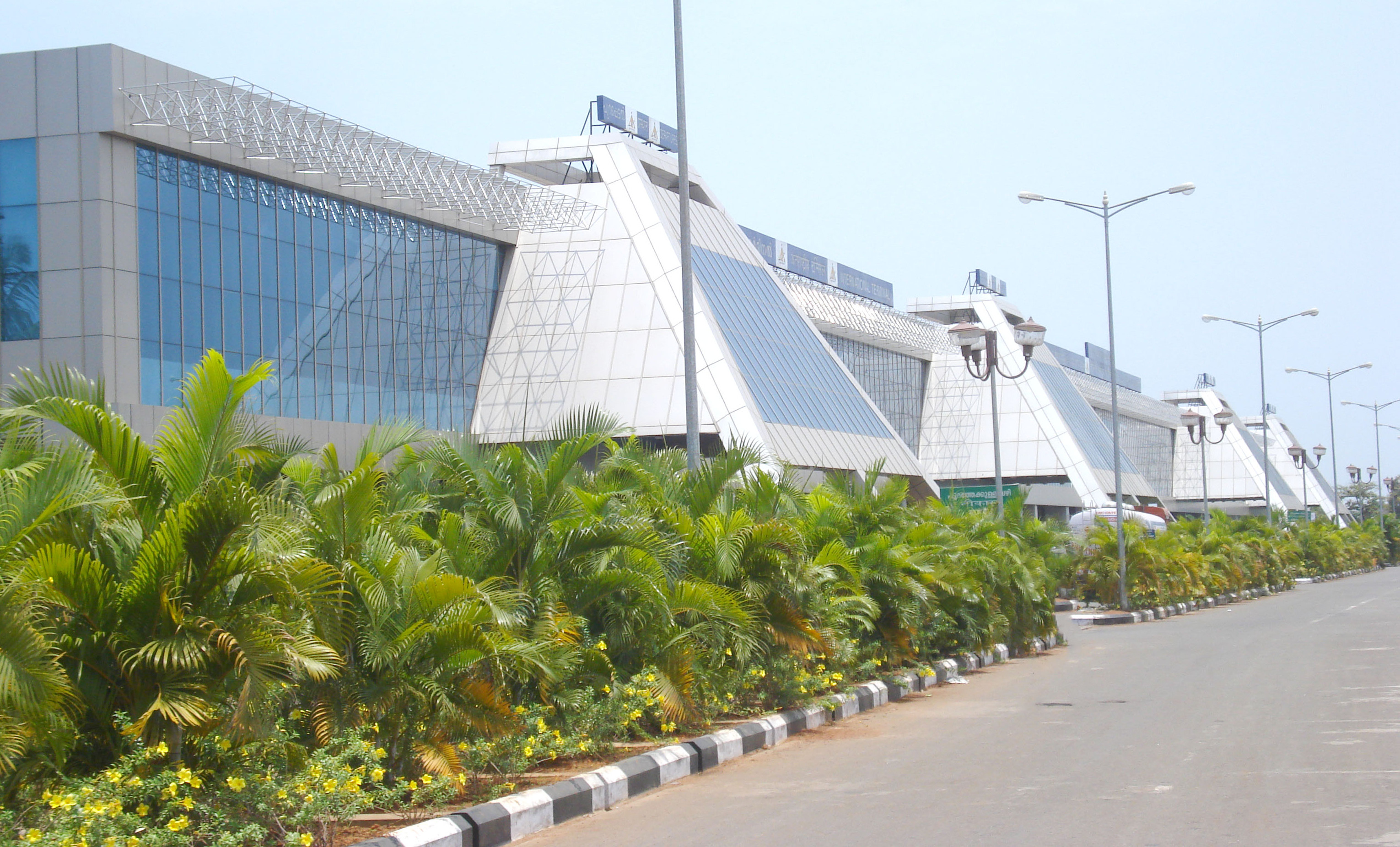
View of Calicut Airport

Calicut International Airport is 26 kilometres (16 mi) from the city at Karipur. Regular domestic services are operated to major Indian cities. There are frequent international flights to the Middle eastern air hubs like Dubai, Abu Dhabi, Salalah, Muscat, Dammam, Riyadh, Jeddah, Sharjah, Bahrain, Doha and to domestic hubs Chennai, Bangalore, Mumbai and New Delhi.
