= State Highway 39 (Kerala) =

Highway in Kerala, India

State Highway 39
- Perumbilavu - Nilambur Road
- SH 39 highlighted in red

Route information
- Maintained by Kerala Public Works Department
- Length: 107.112 km (66.556 mi)

Major junctions
- South end: SH 69 in Perumpilavu
- SH 23 in Pattambi; NH 966 / SH 53 / SH 73 in Perinthalmanna; SH 70 in Melattur
- North end: SH 28 in Nilambur

Location
- Country: India
- State: Kerala
- Districts: Thrissur, Palakkad, Malappuram

Highway system
- Roads in India; Expressways; National; State; Asian; State Highways in Kerala
← SH 38	→ SH 40

State Highway 39 (SH 39) is a State Highway in Kerala, India that starts in Perumbilavu and ends in Nilambur. The highway is 107.112 km long.

== Route ==
Perumbilavu – Koottanad – Kunnamkulam –Pattambi – Perinthalmanna – Melattur–tuvvur -Karuvarakundu – Kalikavu – Pookkottumpadam – Nilambur Road

== See also ==
- Roads in Kerala
- List of state highways in Kerala
