= State Highway 54 (Kerala) =

Highway in Kerala, India

State Highway 54
- Kozhikode - Padinjarathara - Kalpetta Highway
- SH 54 highlighted in red

Route information
- Maintained by Kerala Public Works Department
- Length: 99 km (62 mi)
- Component highways: SH 28 from Puthiyangadi to Kadiyangad

Major junctions
- West end: in Kozhikode
- SH 38 in Puthiyangadi; NH 66 in Cherukulam; SH 68 in Atholi; SH 34 in Ulliyeri
- East end: NH 766 in Kalpetta

Location
- Country: India
- State: Kerala
- Districts: Kozhikode, Wayanad

Highway system
- Roads in India; Expressways; National; State; Asian; State Highways in Kerala
← SH 53	→ SH 55

State Highway 54 (SH 54) is a state highway in Kerala, India that starts in Kozhikode and ends in Kalpetta. SH54 Connecting Major Cities Kozhikode- Ulliyeri - Perambra-Kuttiady- Thottilppalam -Kalpetta .The highway is 99.0 km long. State Government of Kerala abandoned Poozhithode - Padinjarathara road project through Forest area considering difficult to obtain Forest clearance, terrain area, Wildlife Sanctuary and Peruvannamoozhi -Banasurasagar Dam catchment area and rerouted via Kuttiyadi - Thottilppalam - Niravilpuzha - Vellamunda.

== Route map ==
Kozhikode - Pavangad – Ulliyeri – Perambra – Kuttiady - Thottilppalam - Niravilpuzha - Vellamunda - Padinjarethara – Kalpetta

Note that the section Padinjarethara to Poozhithode is not yet laid as the environmental clearance to build the road through the forest is not obtained and rerouted via Kuttiyadi- Thottilppalam - Niravilpuzha - Vellamunda .

== See also ==
- Roads in Kerala
- List of state highways in Kerala
