= State Highway 22 (Kerala) =

Road in Kerala, India

State Highway 22
- Kodungallur - Shornur Road
- SH 22 highlighted in red

Route information
- Maintained by Kerala Public Works Department
- Length: 70.5 km (43.8 mi)

Major junctions
- South end: NH 66 in Kodungallur
- SH 61 in Irinjalakuda; SH 69 / SH 75 in Thrissur; SH 76 in Kuruvanchery; SH 50 in Wadakkancherry; SH 74 in Vazhakode
- North end: SH 23 in Shoranur

Location
- Country: India
- State: Kerala
- Districts: Thrissur, Palakkad

Highway system
- Roads in India; Expressways; National; State; Asian; State Highways in Kerala
| ← SH 21 | → SH 23 |

State Highway 22 (SH 22) is a State Highway in Kerala, India that starts in Kodungallur and ends at State Highway 23. The highway is 70.5 km long.

== Route map ==
SH 22 Highway Shornur <- Cheruthuruthy <- Vazhacode Junction <- Wadakkanchery <- Mulangunnathukavu <- Viyyoor <- North bus stand <- Trichur Round West <- Kuruppam Road <- Kokkalai <- Koorkanchery <- Palakkal <- Chevoor <- Perumbillissery <- Thiruvillakkavu <- Urakam <- Karuvannur - Mapranam <- Irinjalakuda <- Vellangallur <- Pullut <- Kodungallur

== Districts connected by state highway ==
- Thrissur
- Palakkad

== Townships on the state highway ==
- Irinjalakuda
- Wadakkanchery
- Shornur
- Kodungallur

== See also ==
- Roads in Kerala
- List of state highways in Kerala

Geographic data related to State Highway 22 (Kerala) at OpenStreetMap
