= Kadachira Sri Thrikkapalam Siva Temple =

Hindu temple in Kerala, India

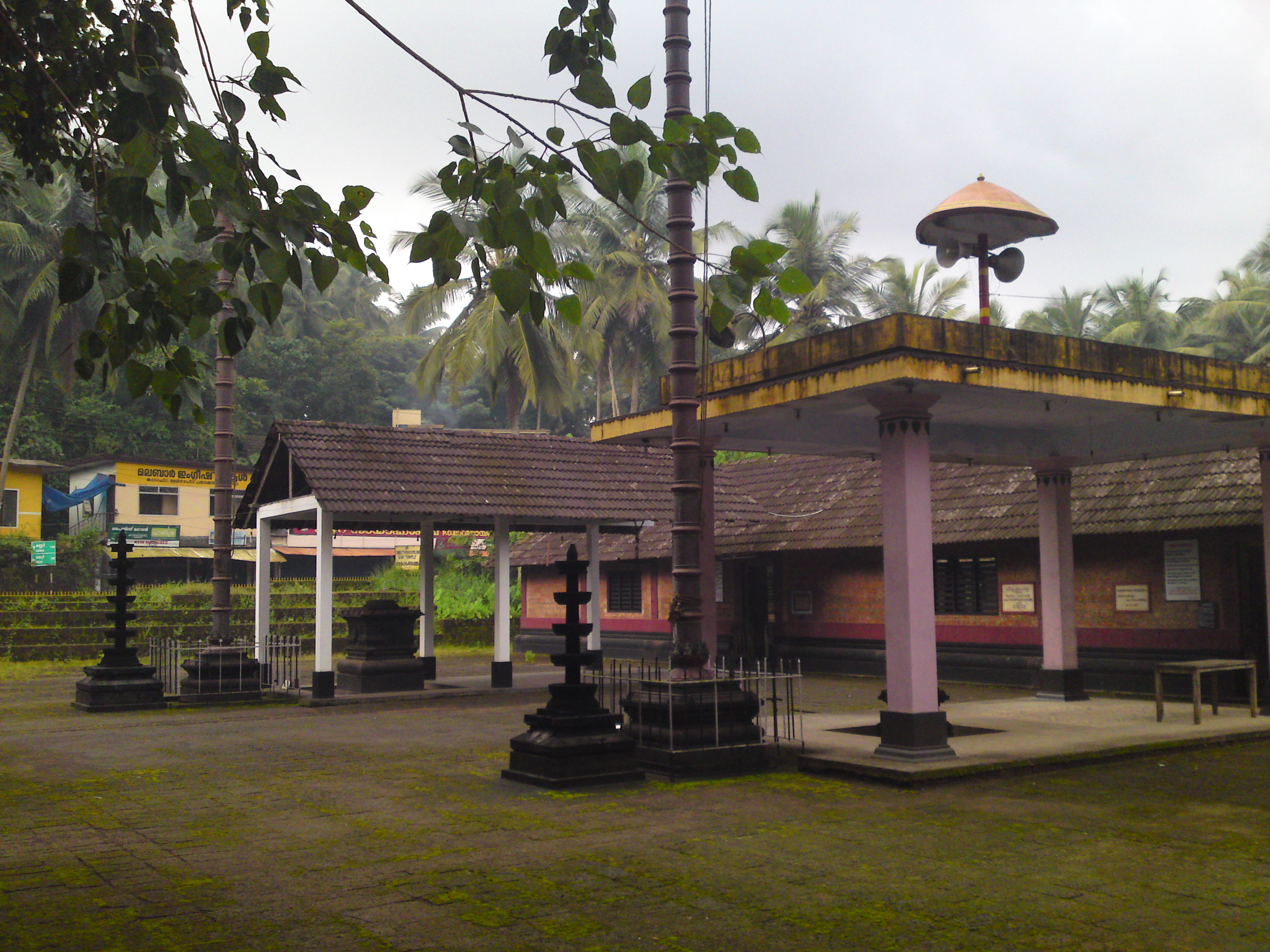
- Temple view

- Location in Kerala

Religion
- Affiliation: Hinduism
- District: Kannur
- Deity: Dakshinamurthy; Dakshinamurthy
- Festival: Maha Shivaratri

Location
- Location: Peralassery, Kadachira
- State: Kerala
- Country: India
- Interactive map of Kadachira Sri Thrikkapalam Siva Temple
- Coordinates: 11.8339°N 75.4595°E

Architecture
- Type: Kerala style
- Completed: Not known

Specifications
- Temple: 1
- Elevation: 45.69 m (150 ft)

Kadachira Sri Thrikkapalam Siva Temple, an ancient Hindu temple dedicated to Lord Shiva is situated on the banks of the Anjarakandi River at Peralassery of Kannur District in Kerala state in India.

The temple is the abode of Dakshinamurthy (is an aspect of the Lord Shiva as a guru/teacher of all types of knowledge). The unique feature of the temple is that there are two idols of equally important in two facets. The both deity of Thrikkapalam temple is Dakshinamurthy and are located in separate sanctum sanctorums facing east. According to folklore, sage Parasurama has installed the idol and the temple is a part of the 108 famous Shiva temples in Kerala. This is one of the three Thrikkapaleeswaram temples mentioned in 108 Shiva temples sothram and other two temples situated in Niranam (Niranam Thrikkapaleeswaram Dakshinamurthy Temple) in Pathanamthitta district and Nadapuram (Nadapuram Iringannur Siva Temple) in Kozhikode district.

== Location ==
The temple is located in Kadachira; on the route of Kannur - Koothuparamba state high way, near to Peralassery junction.

== See also ==
- 108 Shiva Temples
- Temples of Kerala
- Niranam Thrikkapaleeswaram Dakshinamurthy Temple
- Nadapuram Iringannur Siva Temple

== Temple Photos ==
Kadachira Sri Thrikkapalam Siva Temple

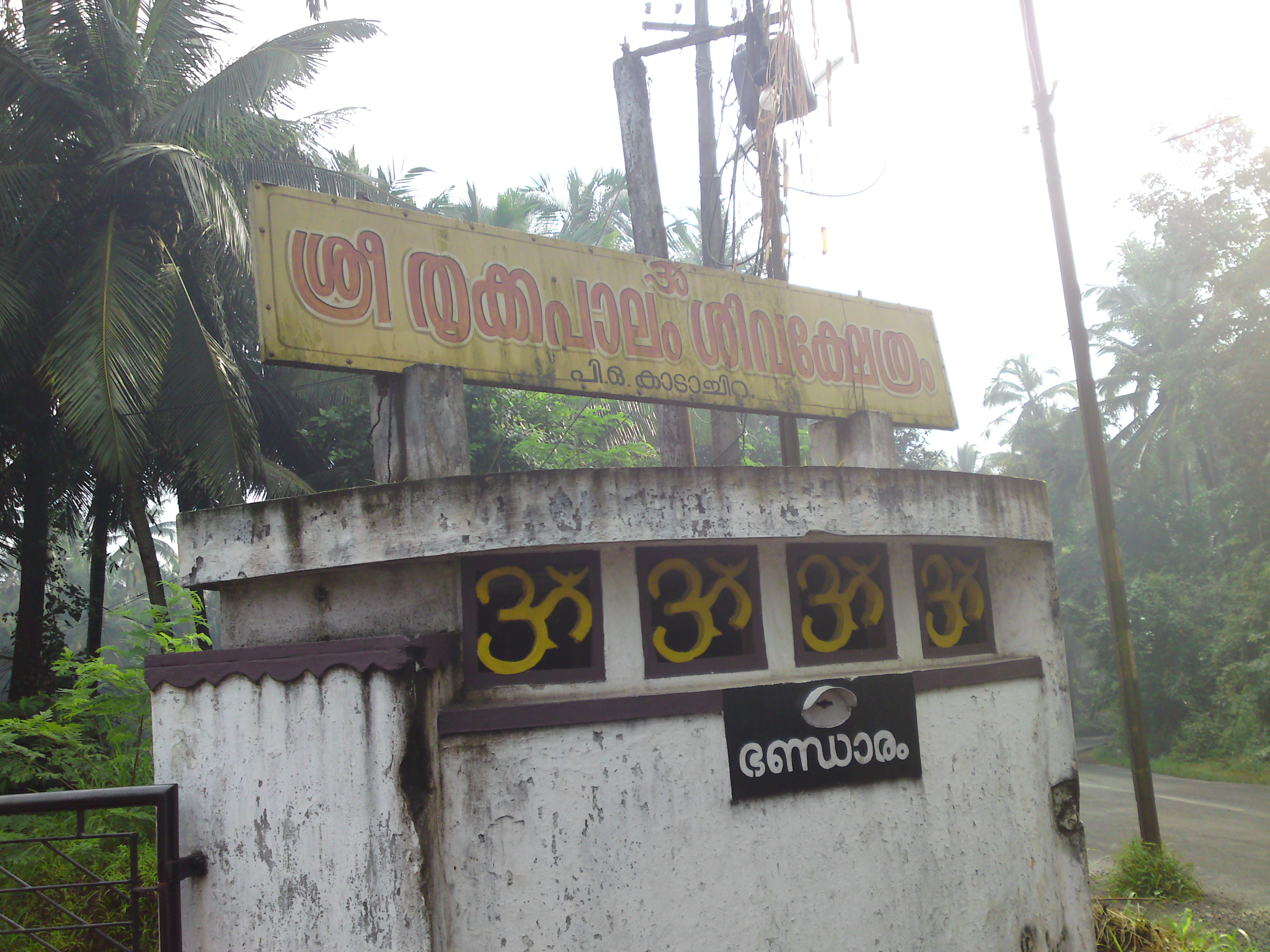
Temple Entrance

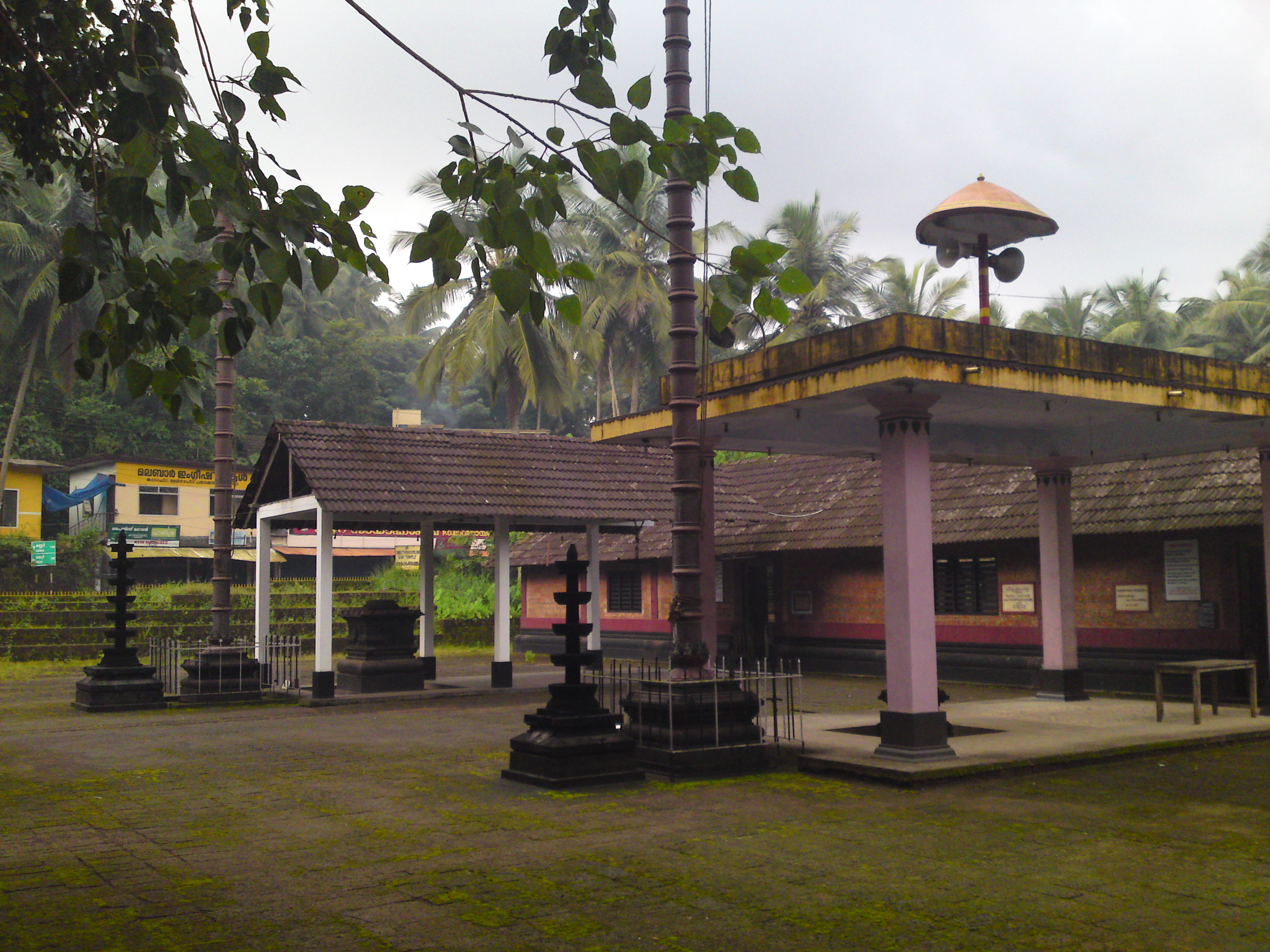
Nalambalam

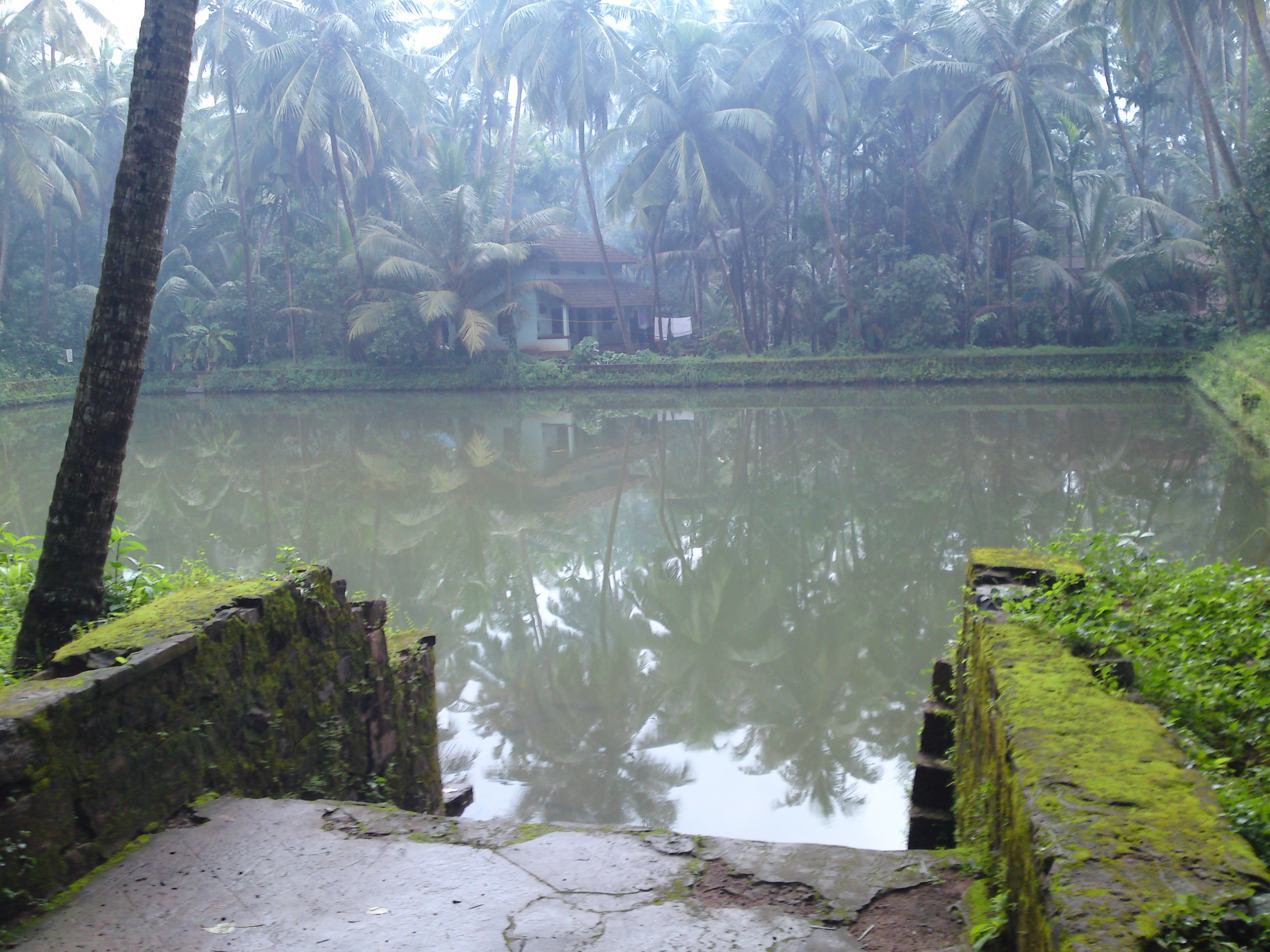
Temple pond
