= Nadapuram Iringannur Siva Temple =

Hindu temple in Kerala, India

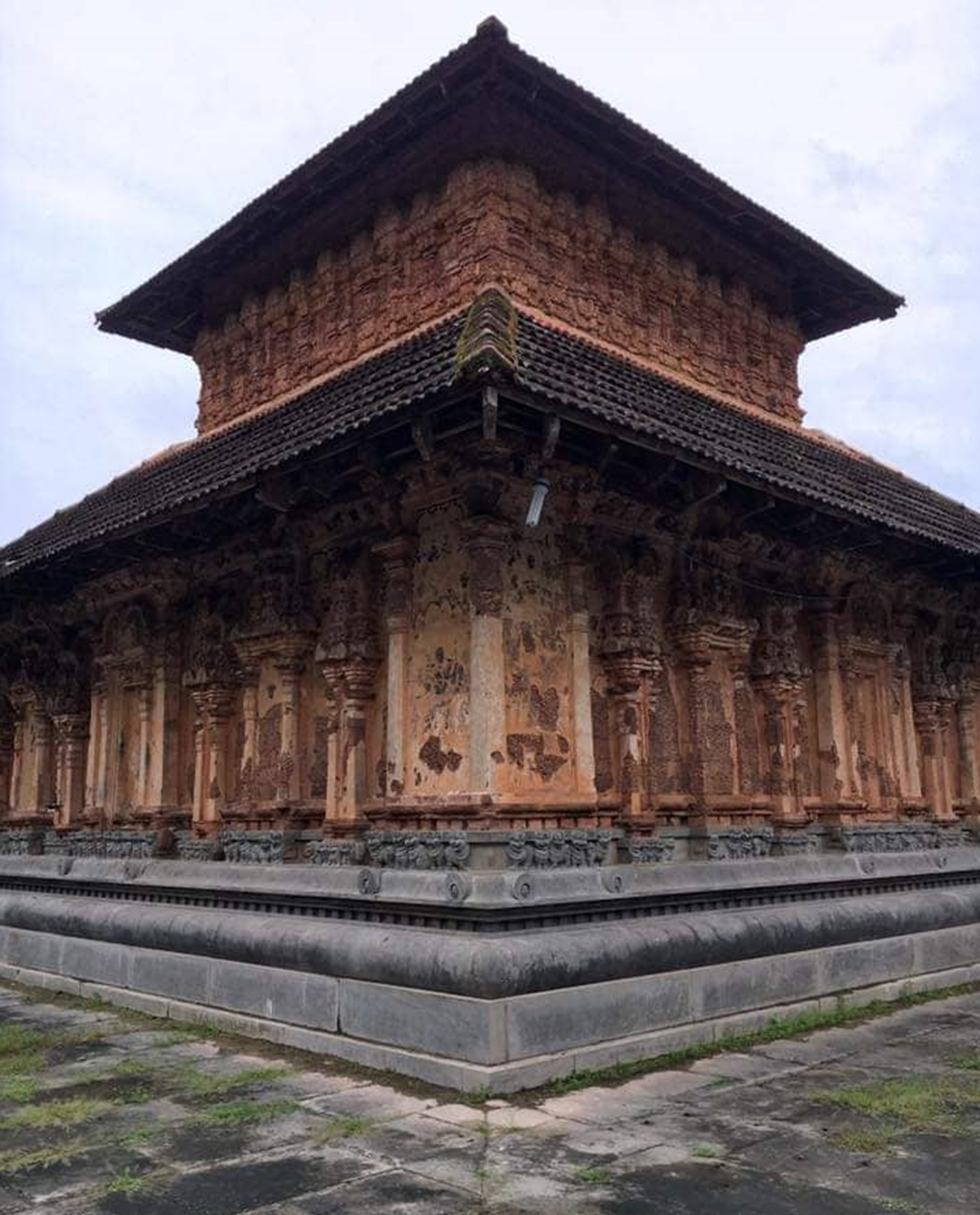
- Temple Sanctum Sanctorum (side view)

- Nadapuram Siva Temple, Iringannur, Kozhikode, Kerala

Religion
- Affiliation: Hinduism
- District: Kozhikkode
- Deity: Dakshinamurthy
- Festival: Maha Shivaratri

Location
- Location: Iringannur
- State: Kerala
- Country: India
- Interactive map of Nadapuram Iringannur Siva Temple
- Coordinates: 11.712853°N 75.617221°E

Architecture
- Type: Kerala style
- Completed: Not known

Specifications
- Temple: 1
- Elevation: 33.21 m (109 ft)

Nadapuram Iringannur Siva Temple, is an ancient Hindu temple dedicated to Lord Shiva is situated at Iringannur village (Edacheri Panchayath) of Kozhikkode District in Kerala state in India. The temple deity of Iringannur Siva temple is Dakshinamurthy and are located in separate sanctum sanctorums facing east. According to folklore, sage Parasurama has installed the idol and the temple is a part of the 108 famous Shiva temples in Kerala. This is one of the three Thrikkapaleeswaram temples mentioned in 108 Shiva temples sothram and other two temples situated in Niranam (Niranam Thrikkapaleeswaram Dakshinamurthy Temple) in Pathanamthitta district and Kadachira (Kadachira Sri Thrikkapalam Siva Temple) in Kannur district.

== Temple, Architecture ==
This is one of the oldest temples of Kozhikode district. The temple is located in Edacherry Panchayat in Nadapuram. The temple is very beautiful and is built like the Maha temples. The Sanctum Sanctorum with its majestic proportions it shows the Kerala temple architectural style. The two-tiered Sanctum Sanctorum is rectangular with tile roofed. The sanctum sanctorum has four doors, one on each side. The doors on the east side only opened. The eastern doors opens to the presence of lord Dhakshinamurthy, represented by shiva lingam.

The temple is facing to the east. There was a big temple tower in the east. It is believed that the temple deity (Lord Shiva) is in the form of Sada Shiva, besides the deity (Shiva Lingom) n the temple having only two eyes. It is said that village name (Iringannur) derived from temple deity; Iru(two=രണ്ട്) +Kannu(Eyes=കണ്ണുകൾ) +Oor(Place= ഊർ). The Temple is the one of major heritage structure in the Kozhikode district of Vadakara. The Iringannur Shiva temple structure and pond were renovated recently.

== Sub Deities ==
- Ganapathy
- Ayyappan
- Snake Goddess
- Srikrishnan

== See also ==
- 108 Shiva Temples
- Temples of Kerala
- Kadachira Sri Thrikkapalam Siva Temple
- Niranam Thrikkapaleeswaram Dakshinamurthy Temple

== Temple Photos ==
Nadapuram Iringannur Siva Temple

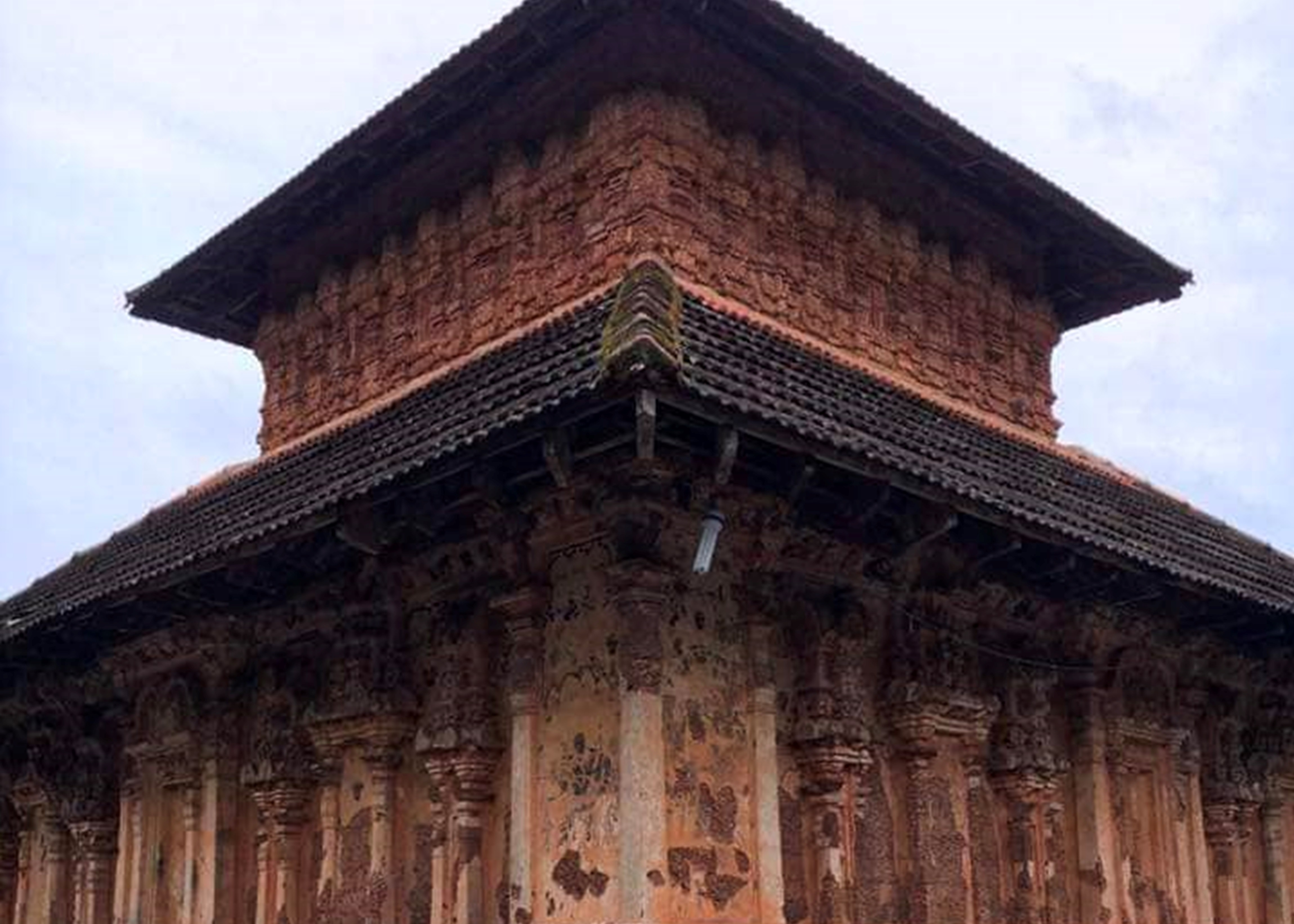
Sanctum Sanctorum

Nalambalam

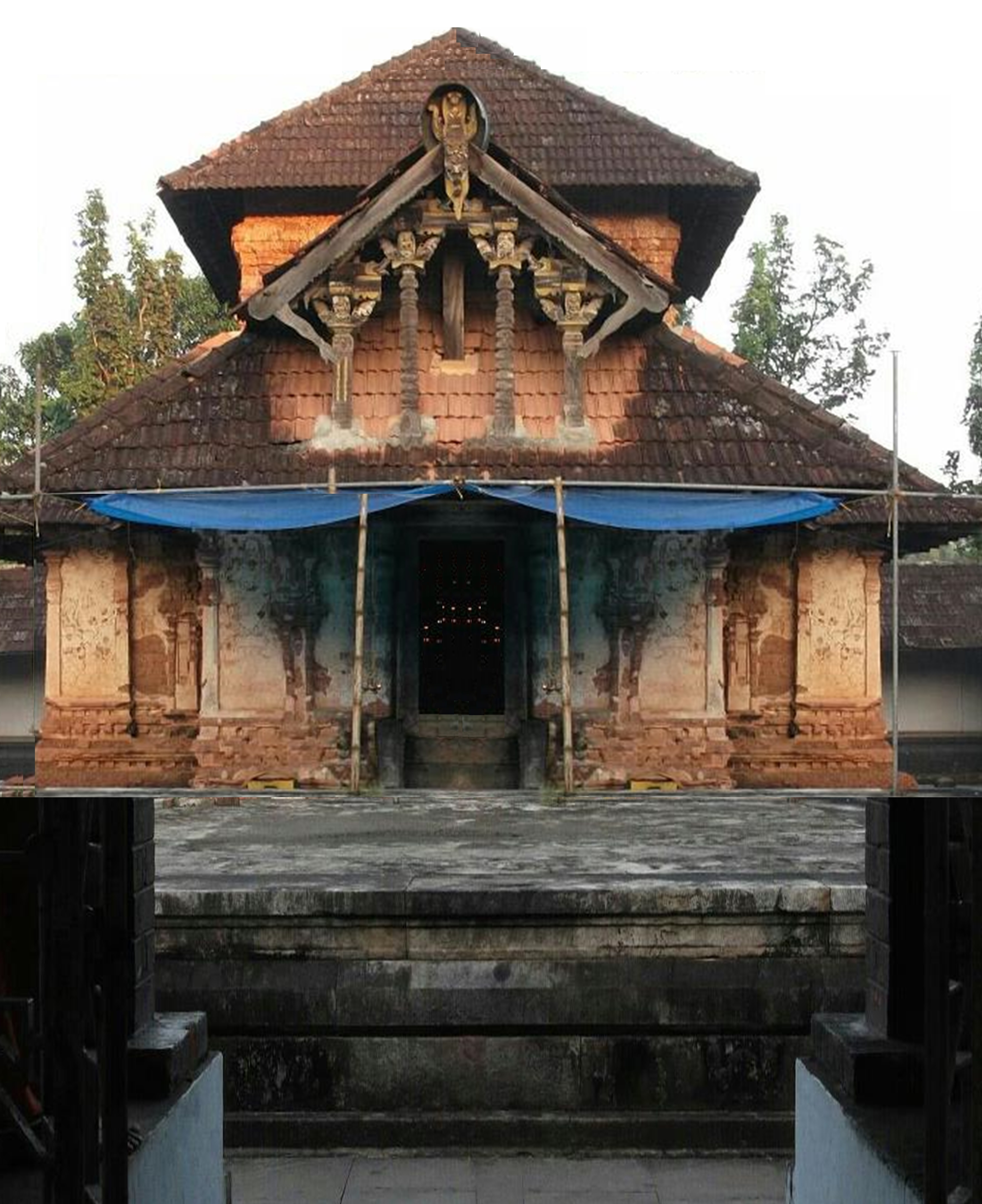
Srikovil from Ambalavattom

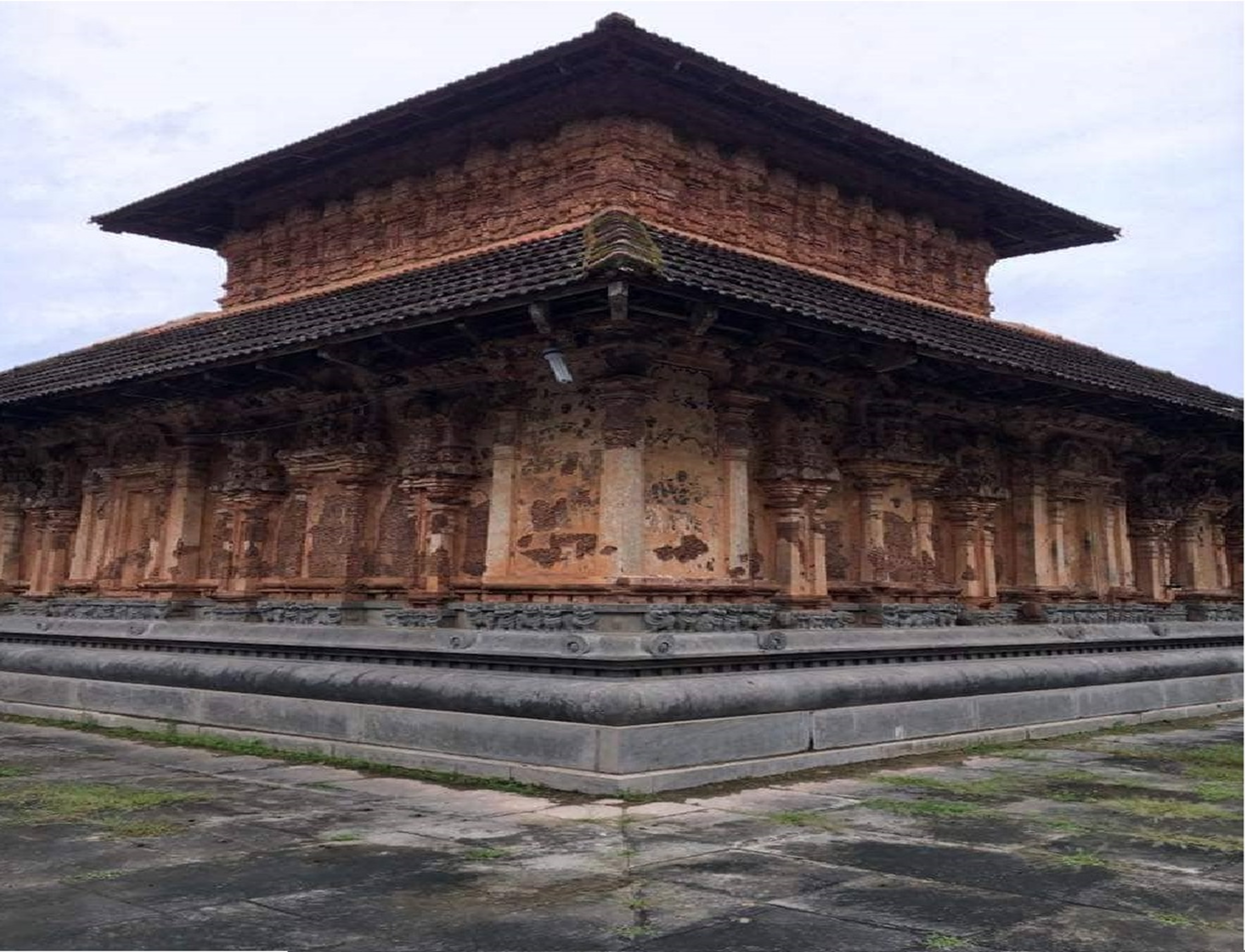
Side view of Double Storey Srikovil

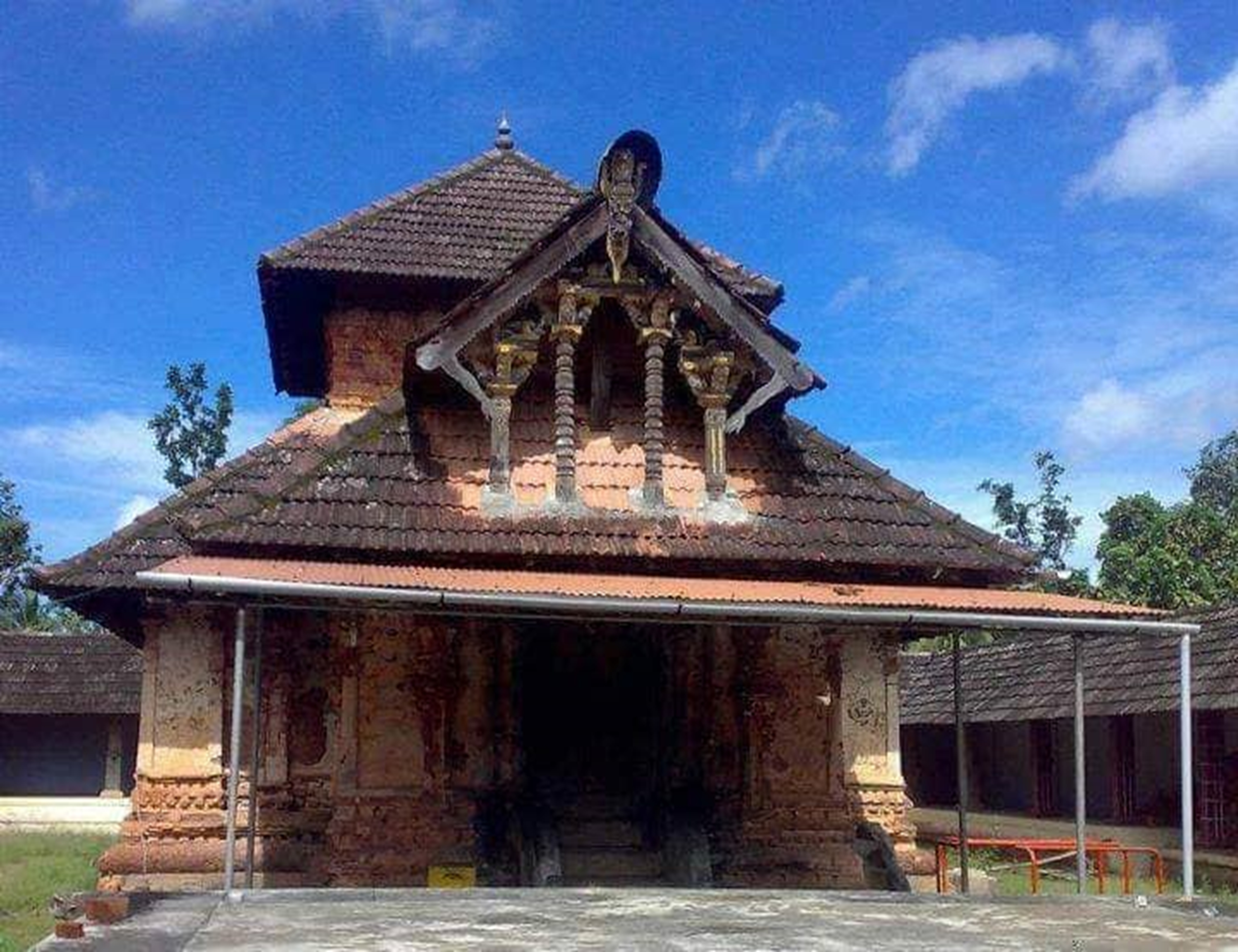
Srikovil
