= Niranam Thrikkapaleeswaram Dakshinamurthy Temple =

Temple in Kerala

- നിരണം തൃക്കപാലീശ്വരം ക്ഷേത്രം
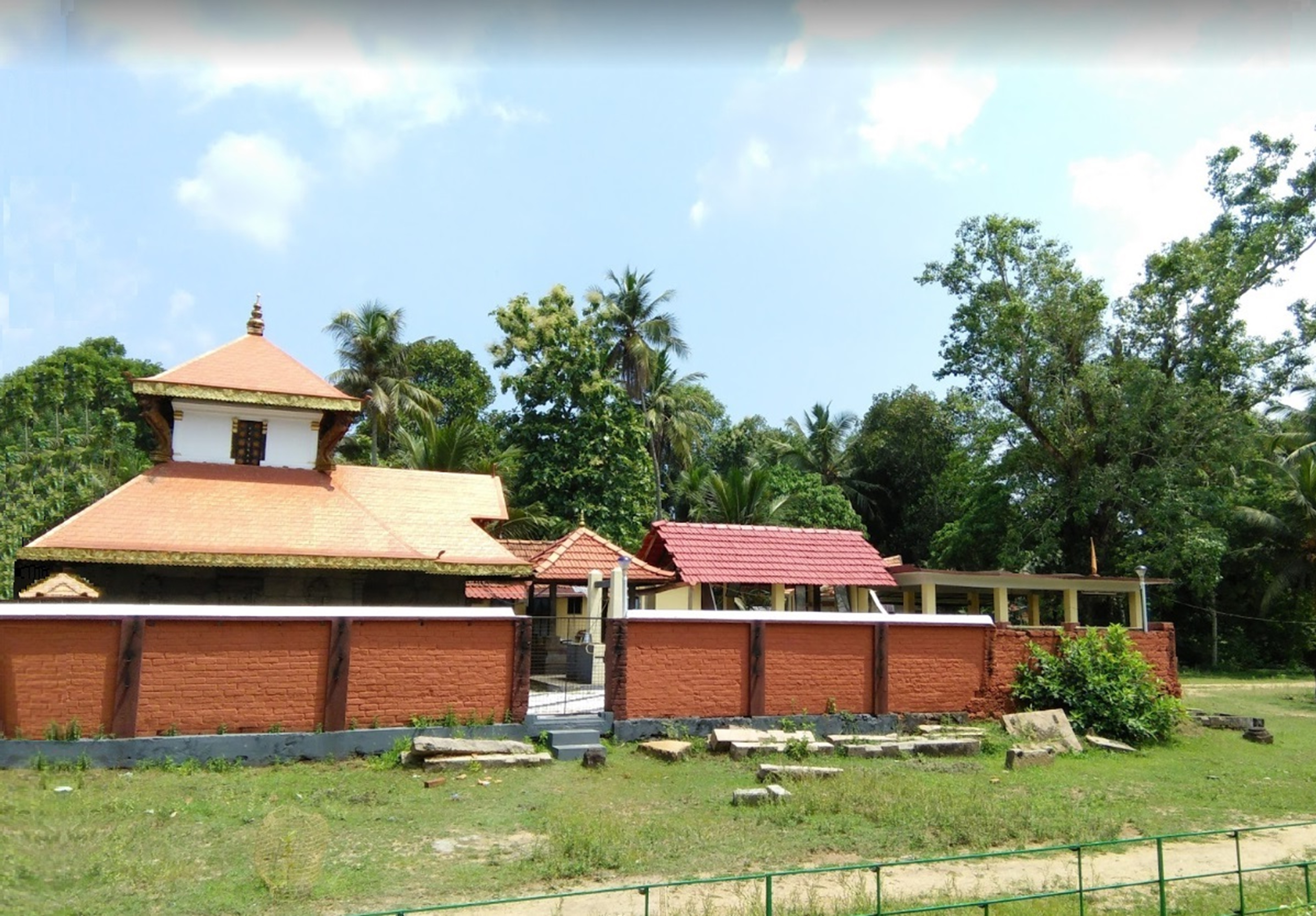
- Temple Side view

- Thrikkapaleeswaram Dakshinamurthy Temple, Niranam, Pathanamthitta, Kerala

Religion
- Affiliation: Hinduism
- District: Pathanamthitta
- Deity: Dakshinamurthy
- Festival: Maha Shivaratri

Location
- Location: Niranam, Thiruvalla
- State: Kerala
- Country: India
- Interactive map of Niranam Thrikkapaleeswaram Dakshinamurthy Temple
- Coordinates: 9.347913°N 76.528588°E

Architecture
- Type: Kerala style
- Completed: Not known

Specifications
- Temple: 1
- Elevation: 27.36 m (90 ft)

Website
- http://www.thrikkapaleeswara.org/

Niranam Thrikkapaleeswaram Dakshinamurthy Temple, an ancient Hindu temple dedicated to Lord Shiva is situated on the banks of the Pampa river at Niranam of Pathanamthitta District in Kerala state in India. This temple is a classic example of the Dravidian style of architecture. The temple is the abode of Dakshinamurthy (is an aspect of the Lord Shiva as a guru (teacher) of all types of knowledge). The deity of Thrikkapaleeswaram is located in main Sanctum Sanctorum facing east. According to folklore, sage Parasurama has installed the idol. The temple is a part of the 108 famous Shiva temples in Kerala. This is one of the three Thrikkapaleeswaram temples mentioned in 108 Shiva temples. Two other temples situated in Peralassery (Kadachira Sri Thrikkapalam Siva Temple) in Kannur district and Nadapuram (Nadapuram Iringannur Siva Temple) in Kozhikode district.

== Saptha Matha ==
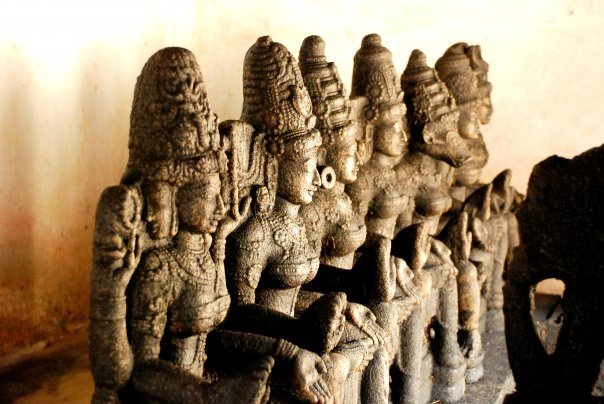
Saptha Mathas

The temple have dedicated statues of Sapthamatha in the separate Sanctum Sanctorum which is not seen in other temple is very special. The major temples in the southern part of Sreekovil (sanctum sanctorum) are in the form of seven balikallu. There are special offerings for them in morning, noon and evening. Sapta mathas are different forms of Adi Parashakti; the deities are Brahmani, Vaishnavi, Maheswari, Kaumari, Varahi, Indrani and Chamundi.

== Temple, History ==
It is an ancient temple. The temple is located in the center of the Pamba River and Manimala River at Niranam. Thrikkapaliswaran is here in the mind of the Vidya Deva Dakshinamurthy. The temple and the place were popular in the period of Niranam poets (Kannassa Kavikal). Several long periods of time had taken the forgotten time. In recent times, the famous astrologer Kanippayyur Shankaran Namboodiripad has conducted a "deva prashna" for the redevelopments of temple. One of the major attractions here is the Shiva lingam. The Shiva lingam is a unique feature and this lingam stone only seen in Himalayas. The main idol is in the form of Kapaleeshvaran Dakshinamurthy is facing east in the main Sanctum Sanctorum.

== Niranam Poets ==
The Niranam poets, also known as the Kannassan poets, were three poets from the same family, 'Madhava Panikkar', 'Sankara Panikkar,' and 'Rama Panikkar' were famous poet and devotee of Thrikkapaleeswaran (Dakshinamurthy), who lived near to temple at Niranam. Their works mainly comprised translation and adaptation of Sanskrit epics and Puranic works and were for devotional purposes. They lived between 1350 and 1450 C.E.

== See also ==
- 108 Shiva Temples
- Temples of Kerala
- Kadachira Sri Thrikkapalam Siva Temple
- Nadapuram Iringannur Siva Temple

== Temple Photos ==
Niranam Thrikkapaleeswaram Dakshinamurthy Temple

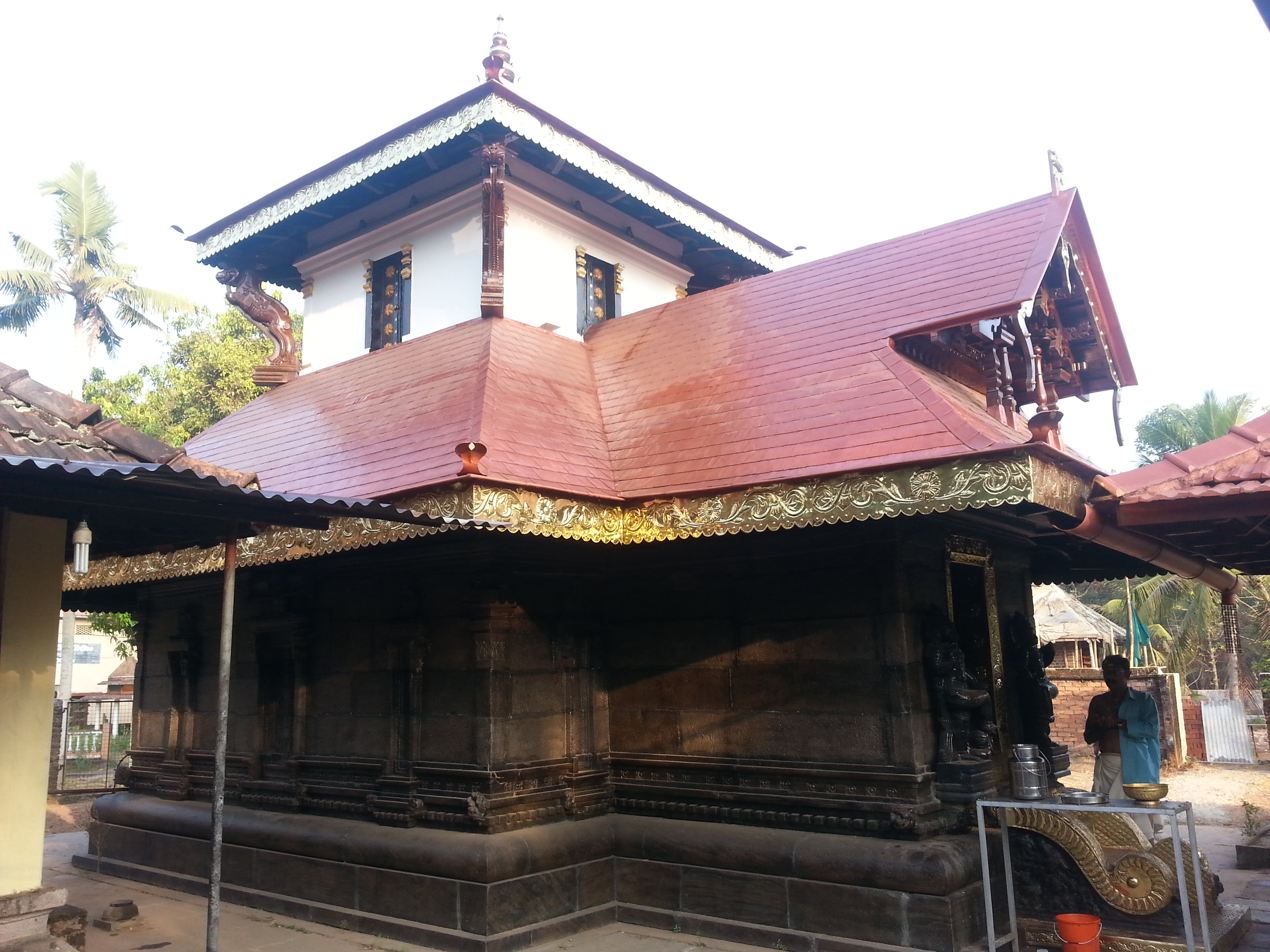
Double Storey Srikovil

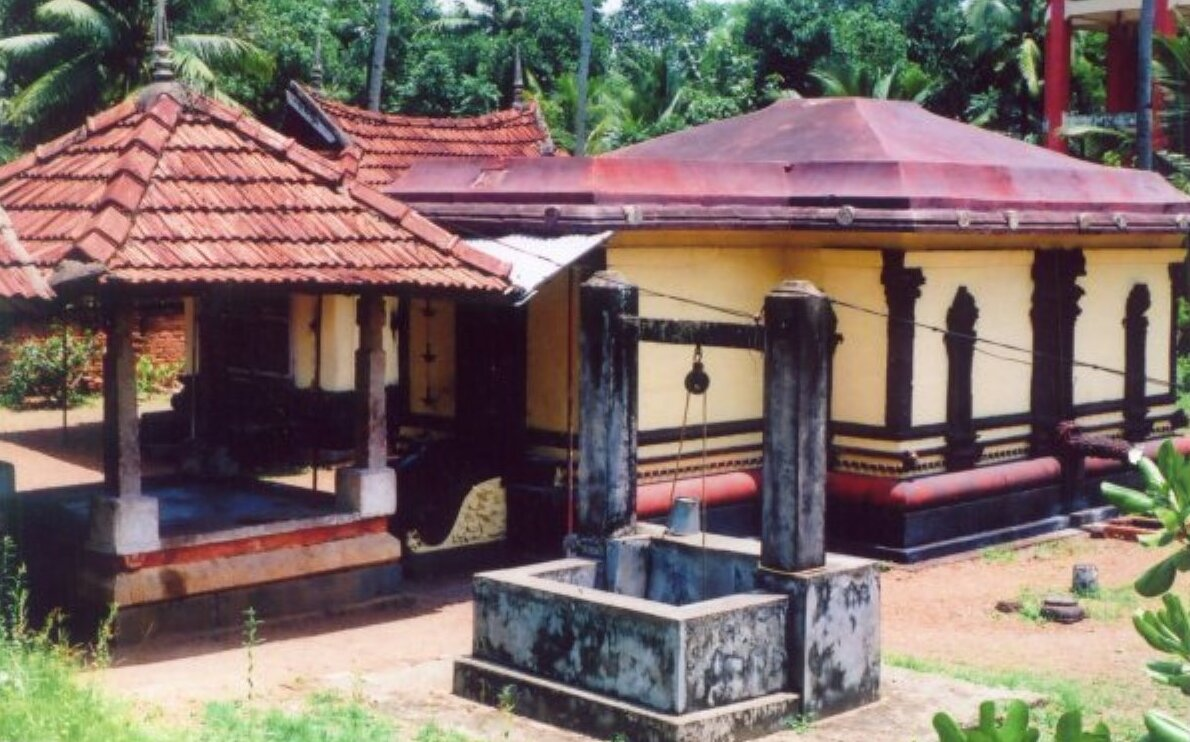
Srikovil (Before rebuilt)

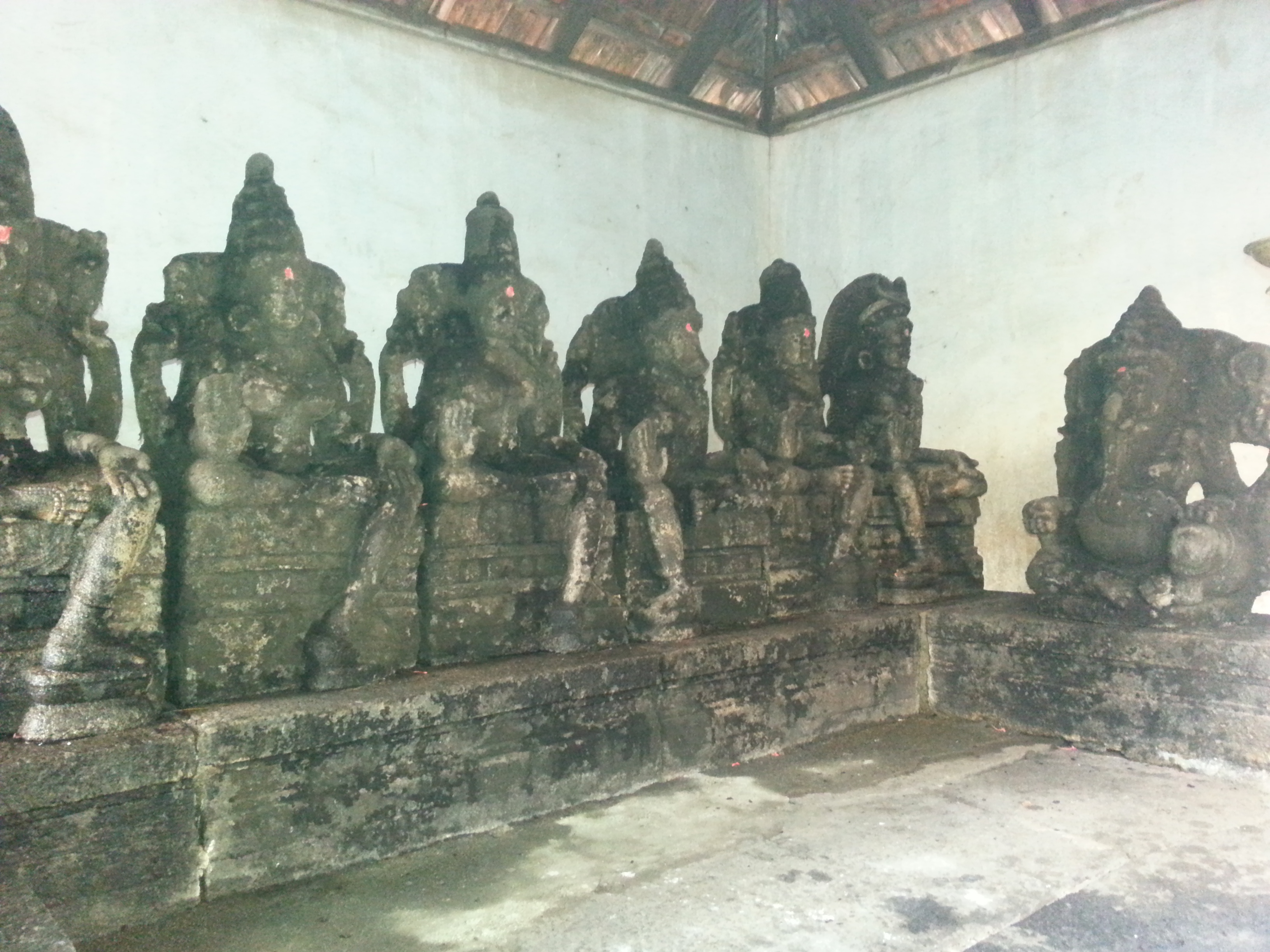
Sapthamathakal
(very rare)

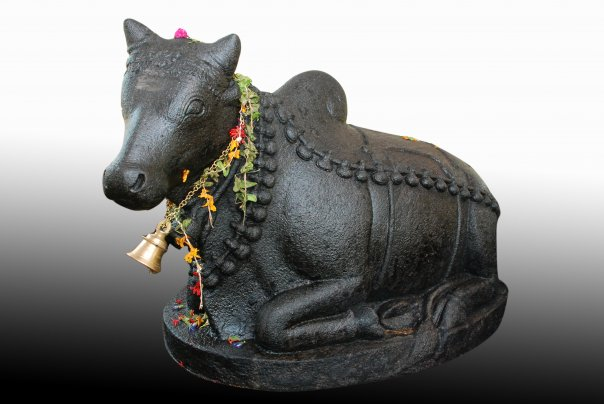
Rishabha Statue

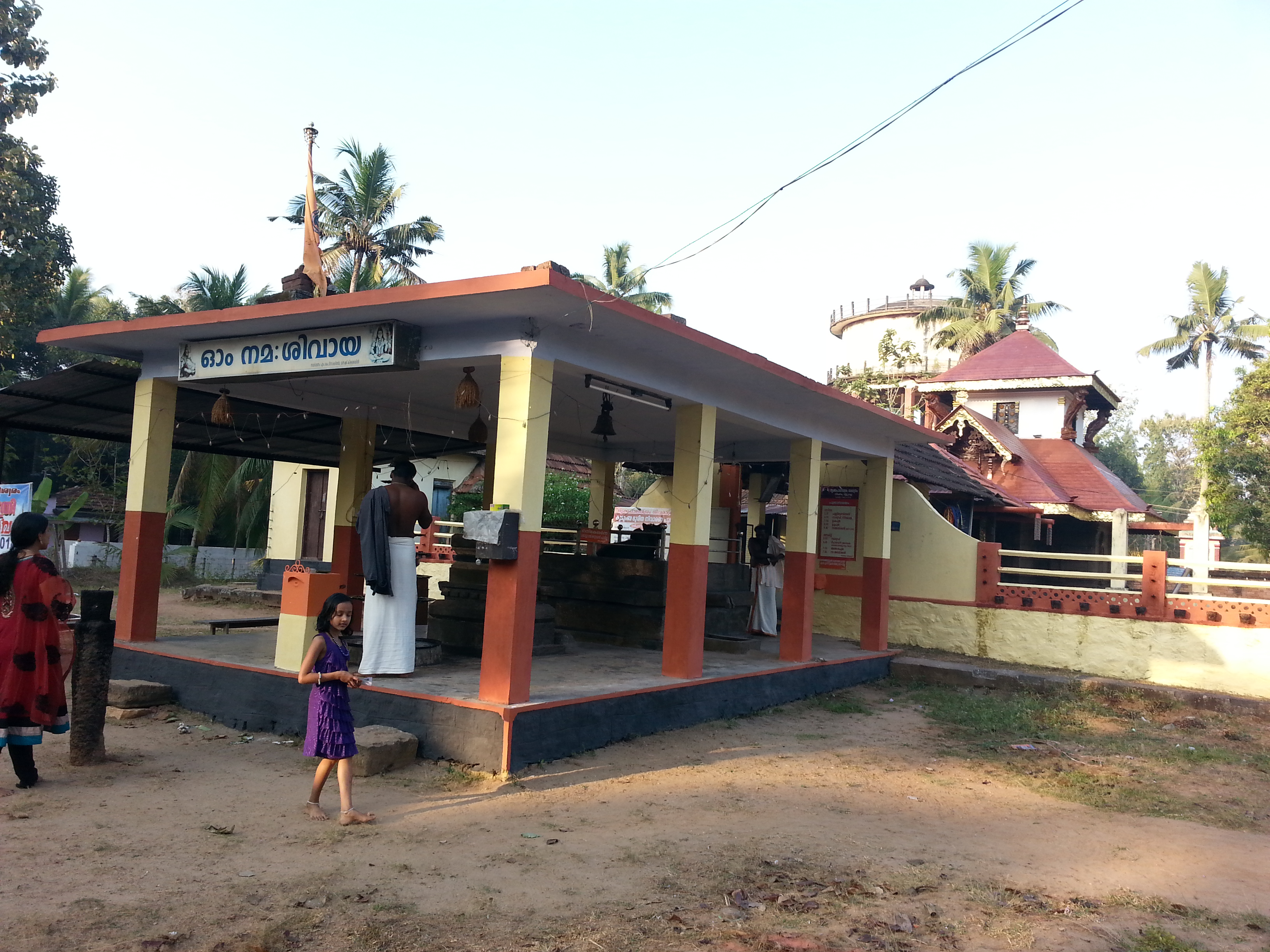
Anakottil
