= State Highway 27 (Kerala) =

Highway in Kerala, India

State Highway 27
- SH 27 highlighted in red

Route information
- Maintained by Kerala Public Works Department
- Length: 35 km (22 mi)

Major junctions
- South end: NH 544 in Kannadi
- SH 25 in Thathamangalam
- North end: SH 19 at Tamil Nadu border in Meenakshipuram

Location
- Country: India
- State: Kerala
- Districts: Palakkad

Highway system
- Roads in India; Expressways; National; State; Asian; State Highways in Kerala
← SH 26	→ SH 28

State Highway 27 (SH 27) is a state highway in Kerala, India that starts in Palakkad Collectorate and ends at Meenakshipuram in the state boundary. The highway is 35.0 km long.

== Route map ==
Palakkad Collectorate(NH 17) - Kannady - Koduvayur - Puthunagaram - Mettupalayam junction, Tattamangalam - Ayyappankavu temple - Nanniyode - Meenakshipuram - Kerala State boundary - Road continues to Pollachi in Tamil Nadu.

== See also ==
- Roads in Kerala
- List of state highways in Kerala
