= State Highway 74 (Kerala) =

Road in Kerala, India

State Highway 74
- Chelakkara Road
- SH 74 highlighted in red

Route information
- Maintained by Kerala Public Works Department
- Length: 33.69 km (20.93 mi)

Major junctions
- West end: SH 22 in Vazhakode Jn.[Near Wadakkanchery]
- SH 77 in Pazhayannur
- East end: NH 544 in Alathur

Location
- Country: India
- State: Kerala
- Districts: Thrissur, Palakkad

Highway system
- Roads in India; Expressways; National; State; Asian; State Highways in Kerala
| ← SH 73 | → SH 75 |

State Highway 74 (SH 74) is a state highway in Kerala, India that starts in Vazhakode and ends in Alathur. The highway is 33.69 km long. The road connects important towns Chelakkara and Pazhayannur

This road from Vazhakkodu to Plazhy of 22.7km was selected to be re-tarred using climate resilient materials under the Rebuild Kerala Initiative for 105.4 crore. EKK Infrastructure Limited was given the tender and work started in 25.10.2021 and work is supposed to be completed by 25.04.2023(18 months construction time). And the contractor will be responsible for all maintenance for next 5 years.

After 12 months of construction, local politicians said only 40% of the project is complete and that they don't think it will complete within the stipulated time of 18 months. They claim the road work is making life of the commuters difficult.

Some construction material was stolen, and the culprits arrested by the police during the construction of this road.

== Route map ==
Vazhakode[Near Wadakkancherry] - Chelakkara - Alathur

== Junctions ==
Vazhakode Junction : Kodungallur - Shornur State Highway, Vazhakode - Alathur State Highway

Manalady : Vazhakode - Alathur State Highway, Chelakkara - Panjal - Shoranur Road

Killimangalam : Vazhakode - Alathur State Highway, Chelakkara - Cheruthuruthy - Shoranur Road (Chelakkara Arts College Road)

Chelakkara - Vazhakode - Alathur State Highway, Chelakkara - Thozhupadam Road

Chelakkara - Kaliyaroad - Elanad - Vaniyampara NH Road

Kayampoovam - Vazhakode - Alathur State Highway, Kayampoovam - Mayannur Bridge - Ottapalam Road

Pazhayannur - Vazhakode - Alathur State Highway, Pazhayannur - Mayannur Bridge - Ottapalam Road, Pazhayannur - Elanad - Vaniyampara NH Road, Pazhayannur - Thiruvilwamala - Lakkidi State Highway

Plazhy - Vazhakode - Alathur State Highway, Plazhy - Kannampara - Thrissur NH Road

Padur - Vazhakode - Alathur State Highway, Padur - Vadakkanchery Road

Kazhani - Vazhakode - Alathur State Highway, Pazhampalakode - Kazhani Road

Alathur - Vazhakode - Alathur State Highway, Mupuzha - Alathur Road, Salem - Ernakulam NH

== See also ==
- Roads in Kerala
- List of state highways in Kerala
