= State Highway 77 (Kerala) =

Road in Kerala, India

State Highway 77
- Chelakkara Road
- SH 77 highlighted in red

Route information
- Maintained by Kerala Public Works Department
- Length: 11.857 km (7.368 mi)

Major junctions
- North end: in Lakkidi
- South end: SH 74 in Pazhayannur

Location
- Country: India
- State: Kerala
- Districts: Palakkad, Thrissur

Highway system
- Roads in India; Expressways; National; State; Asian; State Highways in Kerala
← SH 76

State Highway 77 (SH 77) is a State Highway in Kerala, India that starts at Lakkidi Road. It is located in Thrissur and Palakkad districts.

The highway is 11.857 km (7.368 mi) long.

The Route is Lakkidi road - Pambadi Road - Lakkidi Railway Station Road.
