= State Highway 38 (Kerala) =

Highway in Kerala, India

State Highway 38
- Puthiyangadi Koothuparamba – Chovva bypass
- SH 38 highlighted in red

Route information
- Maintained by Kerala Public Works Department
- Length: 107 km (66 mi)

Major junctions
- South end: in Puthiyangadi, Kozhikode
- NH 66 in Cherukulam; SH 68 in Atholi; SH 34 in Ulliyeri; SH 30 in Koothuparamba; SH 54 in Kadiyangad
- North end: NH 66 in Thazhe Chovva

Location
- Country: India
- State: Kerala
- Districts: Kozhikode, Kannur

Highway system
- Roads in India; Expressways; National; State; Asian; State Highways in Kerala
← SH 37	→ SH 39

State Highway 38 (SH 38) also known as PUKC Road is a state highway in Kerala, India that starts in Puthiyangadi and ends in Chovva. The highway is107;km long.

== Route map ==
Puthiyangadi – Atholi- Ulliyeri – Perambra – Kuttiyadi – Nadapuram – Peringathur – Mekkunnu -Panoor – Koothuparamba – Chovva bypass

== See also ==
- Roads in Kerala
- List of state highways in Kerala
