= State Highway 69 (Kerala) =

Road in Kerala, India

State Highway 69
- Thrissur - Kuttippuram Road
- SH 69 highlighted in red
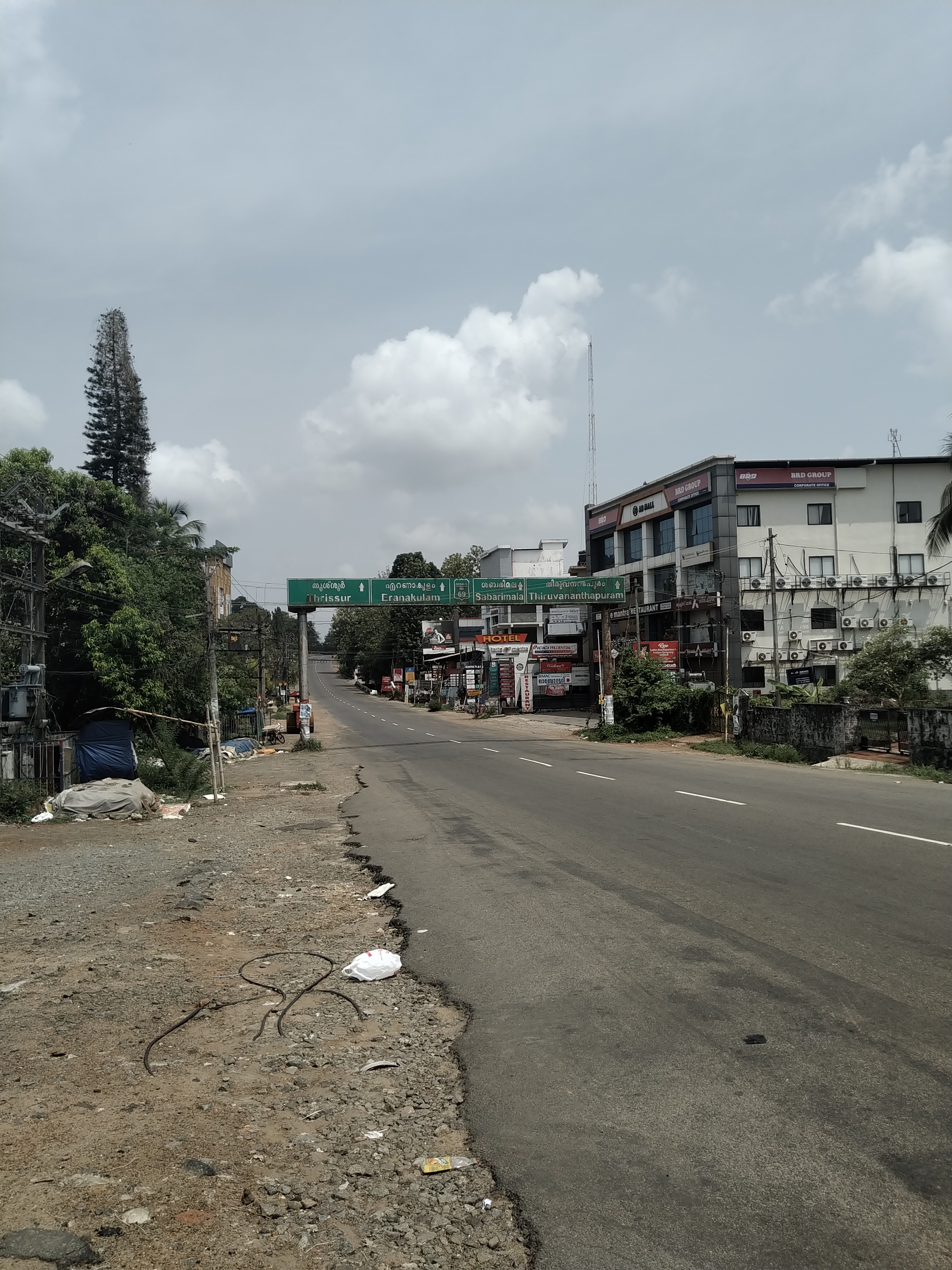
- Empty SH 69 during COVID-19 pandemic lockdown

Route information
- Maintained by Kerala Public Works Department
- Length: 52.65 km (32.72 mi)

Major junctions
- South end: Swaraj Round, Thrissur
- SH 76 in Kechery; SH 49 in Choondal; SH 50 in Kunnamkulam; SH 39 in Perumpilavu
- North end: NH 66 in Kuttipuram

Location
- Country: India
- State: Kerala
- Districts: Thrissur, Malappuram

Highway system
- Roads in India; Expressways; National; State; Asian; State Highways in Kerala
← SH 68	→ SH 70

State Highway 69 (SH 69) is a State Highway in Kerala, India that starts in Thrissur and ends in Thrikkanapuram near Kuttippuram ( joins National Highway 66). The highway is 52.65 km long.

== Route map ==
Thrissur – Puzhakkal – Muthuvara – Peramangalam – Mundur – Kechery – Choondal – Kunnamkulam – Perumpilavu – Changaramkulam– Edappal – Thrikkanapuram (joins NH 66)

== Road Conditions ==
This road has been poorly maintained by the Kerala PWD for years and the restoration works have been leading to major traffic jams especially in the Puzhakkal area and vehicles have to take alternate routes to travel.

== See also ==
- Roads in Kerala
- List of state highways in Kerala
