= State Highway 72 (Kerala) =

Highway in Kerala, India

State Highway 72
- Malappuram-Parappanangadi road
- SH 72 highlighted in red

Route information
- Maintained by Kerala Public Works Department
- Length: 29 km (18 mi)

Major junctions
- East end: NH 966 / SH 71 in Malappuram
- NH 66 in Kooriyad
- West end: SH 65 in Tirurangadi

Location
- Country: India
- State: Kerala
- Districts: Malappuram

Highway system
- Roads in India; Expressways; National; State; Asian; State Highways in Kerala
← SH 71	→ SH 73

State Highway 72 (SH 72) is a state highway in Kerala, India that starts in Malappuram and ends in Thirurangadi. The highway is 29 km long.

== Route map ==
Malappuram (Km 48/9 of NH 213 and overlaps NH 213 for 2.0 km from the starting point) – Panakkad – Vengara.

== See also ==
- Roads in Kerala
- List of state highways in Kerala
