= Mundur, Palakkad =

Mundur
- Suburb
- Location in Kerala, India Mundur (India)
- Coordinates: 10°50′10″N 76°34′50″E
- Country: India
- State: Kerala
- District: Palakkad

Government
  - Body: Mundur Panchayat

Area
  - Total: 30.04 km^{2} (11.60 sq mi)

Population (2011)
  - Total: 30,648
  - Density: 1,020/km^{2} (2,642/sq mi)

Languages
  - Official: Malayalam, English
- Time zone: UTC+5:30 (IST)
- PIN: 678592
- Vehicle registration: KL-9
- Parliament constituency: Palakkad
- Assembly constituency: Malampuzha

Mundur is a town and gram panchayat in the Palakkad district, state of Kerala, India. Mundur is an important junction which connects National Highway 966 and State Highway 53. It is located about 11 km from Palakkad city and is one of the growing suburbs.

== Famous Personalities ==
PU Chitra- Indian Middle Distance Runner

== Population ==
- Mundur.I: 17,570 people
- Mundur.II: 11,177 people
