= State Highway 65 (Kerala) =

Highway in Kerala, India

State Highway 65
- Parappanangadi-Areacode road
- SH 65 highlighted in red

Route information
- Maintained by Kerala Public Works Department
- Length: 40.45 km (25.13 mi)

Major junctions
- West end: in Parappanangadi
- NH 66 / SH 72 in Tirurangadi; SH 65 near Karippur
- East end: SH 34 near Areacode

Location
- Country: India
- State: Kerala
- Districts: Malappuram

Highway system
- Roads in India; Expressways; National; State; Asian; State Highways in Kerala
← SH 64	→ SH 66

State Highway 65 (SH 65) is a state highway in Kerala, India that starts in Parappanangadi and ends in Areacode. The highway is 44.1 km long.

== Route map ==
Parappanangadi – Chemmad – Thirurangadi – Kolappuram – Kunnumpuram – Kondotty – Kizhisseri - Puthalam junction (joins Koyilandy - Edavanna SH at Puthalam jn 1.6 km away from Areacode)

== See also ==
- Roads in Kerala
- List of state highways in Kerala
