= State Highway 25 (Kerala) =

Highway in Kerala, India

State Highway 25
- Thathamangalam Chittoor Nattukal Road
- SH 25 highlighted in red

Route information
- Maintained by Kerala Public Works Department
- Length: 14.2 km (8.8 mi)

Major junctions
- South end: SH 27 in Thathamangalam
- North end: SH 26 in Nattukal

Location
- Country: India
- State: Kerala
- Districts: Palakkad

Highway system
- Roads in India; Expressways; National; State; Asian; State Highways in Kerala
| ← SH 23 | → SH 26 |

State Highway 25 (SH 25) is a state highway in Kerala, India that starts in Mettupalayam and ends in SH 26 . The highway is 14.2 km long.

== Route map ==
Mettupalayam junction, Tattamangalam- Chittur - Nattukal junction (joins Nattukal - Velamthavalam Highway)SH 26

== See also ==
- Roads in Kerala
- List of state highways in Kerala
