= State Highway 71 (Kerala) =

Highway in Kerala, India

State Highway 71
- Tirur-Malappuram-Manjeri road
- SH 71 highlighted in red

Route information
- Maintained by Kerala Public Works Department
- Length: 39 km (24 mi)

Major junctions
- West end: in Tirur
- NH 66 in Edarikode; NH 966 / SH 72 in Malappuram
- East end: SH 28 in Manjeri

Location
- Country: India
- State: Kerala
- Districts: Malappuram

Highway system
- Roads in India; Expressways; National; State; Asian; State Highways in Kerala
← SH 70	→ SH 72

State Highway 71 (SH 71) or Tirur - Malappuram - Manjeri road is a State Highway in Kerala, India that starts in Tirur passing through Kottakkal, Malappuram and ends in Manjeri. The highway is 39.0 km long.

== Route map ==
Tirur - Edarikode - Kottakkal - Puthur - Othukkungal - Vadakkemanna - Malappuram - Irumbuzhi - anakkayam - Manjeri

== See also ==
- Roads in Kerala
- List of state highways in Kerala
