= State Highway 73 (Kerala) =

Highway in Kerala, India

State Highway 73
- Valanchery Nilambur Road
- SH 73 highlighted in red

Route information
- Maintained by Kerala Public Works Department
- Length: 51.41 km (31.94 mi)

Major junctions
- South end: NH 66 in Valanchery
- NH 966 in Angadippuram; SH 39 in Perinthalmanna
- North end: SH 28 near Nilambur

Location
- Country: India
- State: Kerala
- Districts: Malappuram

Highway system
- Roads in India; Expressways; National; State; Asian; State Highways in Kerala
← SH 72	→ SH 74

State Highway 73 (SH 73) is a state highway in Kerala, India that starts in Valanchery and ends in Nilambur. The highway is 51.41 km long.

== Route map ==
Valanchery -Angadipuram -Perinthalmanna-Pandikkad-Wandoor-Nilambur

== See also ==
- Roads in Kerala
- List of state highways in Kerala
