= Akash S. Madhavan =

Indian athlete

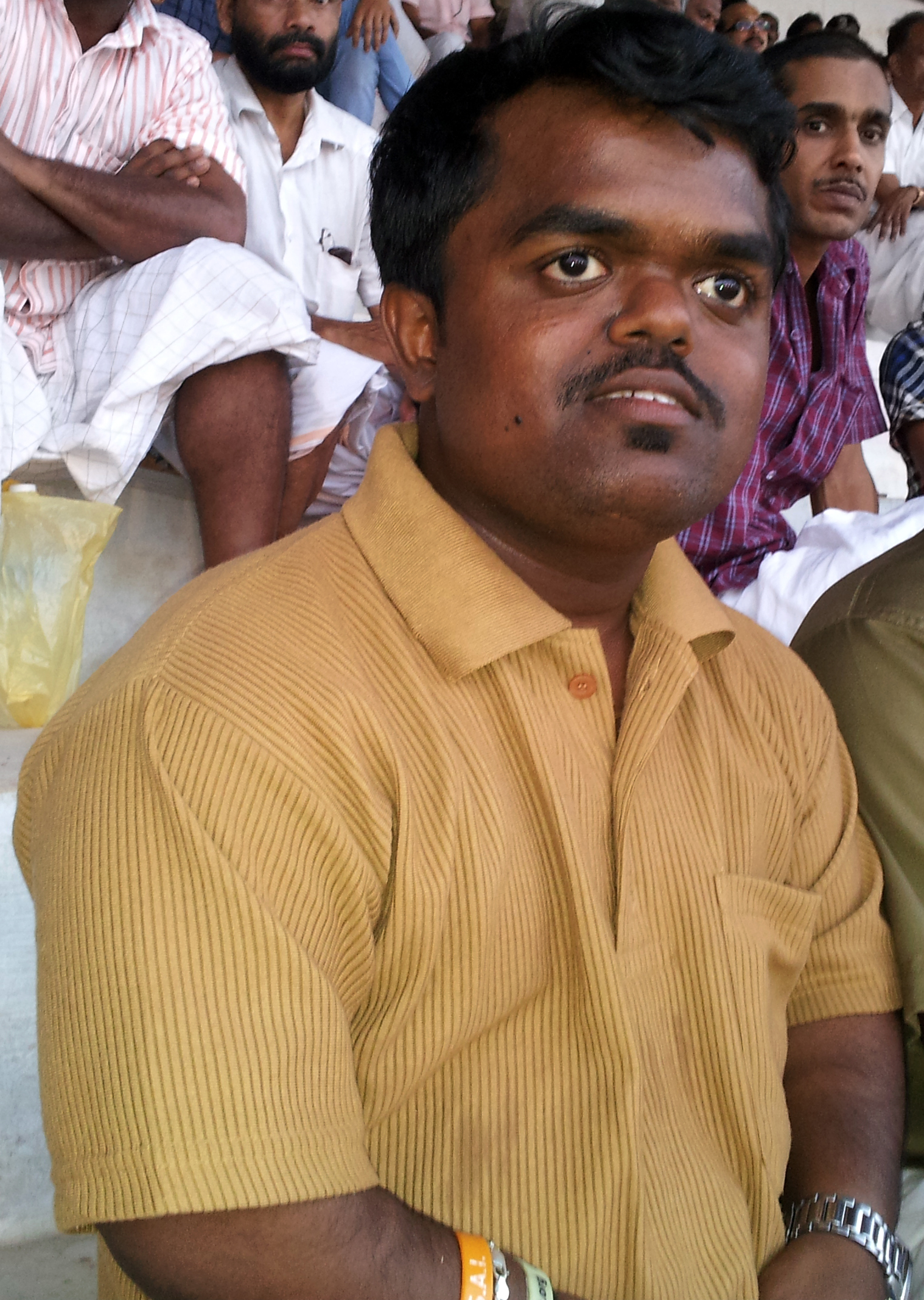
- Born: 1989 or 1990 (age 36–37); Melattur, Malappuram district, Kerala, India
- Sports career
- Home town: Melattur in Malappuram district
- Height: 130 cm (4 ft 3 in)
- Country: India
- Sport: Multiple
- Event: World Dwarf Games
Medal record
World Dwarf Games
| Silver medal – second place | 2013 East Lansing, United States | Shot put |
| Bronze medal – third place | 2013 East Lansing, United States | Dicus throw |
| Bronze medal – third place | 2017 Guelph, Canada | Javelin throw |
National Para-Badminton Championship
| Gold medal – first place | 2013 | Badminton doubles |

Akash S. Madhavan is an Indian athlete from Kerala. Representing India, he has won a silver medal in shot put, a bronze in discus throw, and a bronze in javelin throw at the World Dwarf Games.

== Biography ==
Akash was born to Sethumadhavan and Geetha at Melattur in Malappuram district of Kerala. He is suffering from achondroplasia, a genitic disorder that causes dwarfism. His height is only 130 cm. His primary education was at Valluvanad Vidya Bhavan HSS in Perinthalmanna. It was U. K. Haridas, the physical education teacher there who encouraged him to take up athletics. He passed Class 10 and 12 with a first class. After completing degree in automobile engineering from Tamil Nadu College of Engineering, Coimbatore, he got a job as a service center advisor in an automobile company, but was rejected due to his short height.

Along with his father, Akash runs a business of Ayurvedic and beauty products in Perinthalmanna.

Akash contested from ward 15 of Melattur grama panchayat as a BJP candidate in the 2020 Kerala local elections. Currently, he is also the BJP's Malappuram district sports cell convener.

=== Personal life ===
Akash is married to Devi Siti Sendari, a native of Surabaya, Indonesia. Their wedding took place at the Thirumandhamkunnu Bhagavathy Temple in Angadipuram.

== Career ==
In the World Dwarf Games in 2013, Akash won silver in shotput and bronze in discus throw and in the 2017 games, he won bronze in the javelin throw. He also won gold in badminton doubles in the National Para-Badminton Championship.
