= State Highway 76 (Kerala) =

Road in Kerala, India

State Highway 76
- Kuranchery - Velur Road
- SH 76 highlighted in red

Route information
- Maintained by Kerala Public Works Department
- Length: 12.838 km (7.977 mi)

Major junctions
- East end: SH 22 in Kuranchery[Near Wadakkanchery]
- West end: SH 69 in Kechery

Location
- Country: India
- State: Kerala
- Districts: Thrissur

Highway system
- Roads in India; Expressways; National; State; Asian; State Highways in Kerala
← SH 75	→ SH 77

State Highway 76 (SH 76) is a State Highway in Kerala, India that starts in Kuranchery and ends in Kechery. The highway is 12.838 km long.

== Route map ==
Kuranchery -Aryampadam - Mundathikode - Velur - Kechery

== See also ==
- Roads in Kerala
- List of state highways in Kerala
