= Melattur, Kerala =

Melattur
- Village
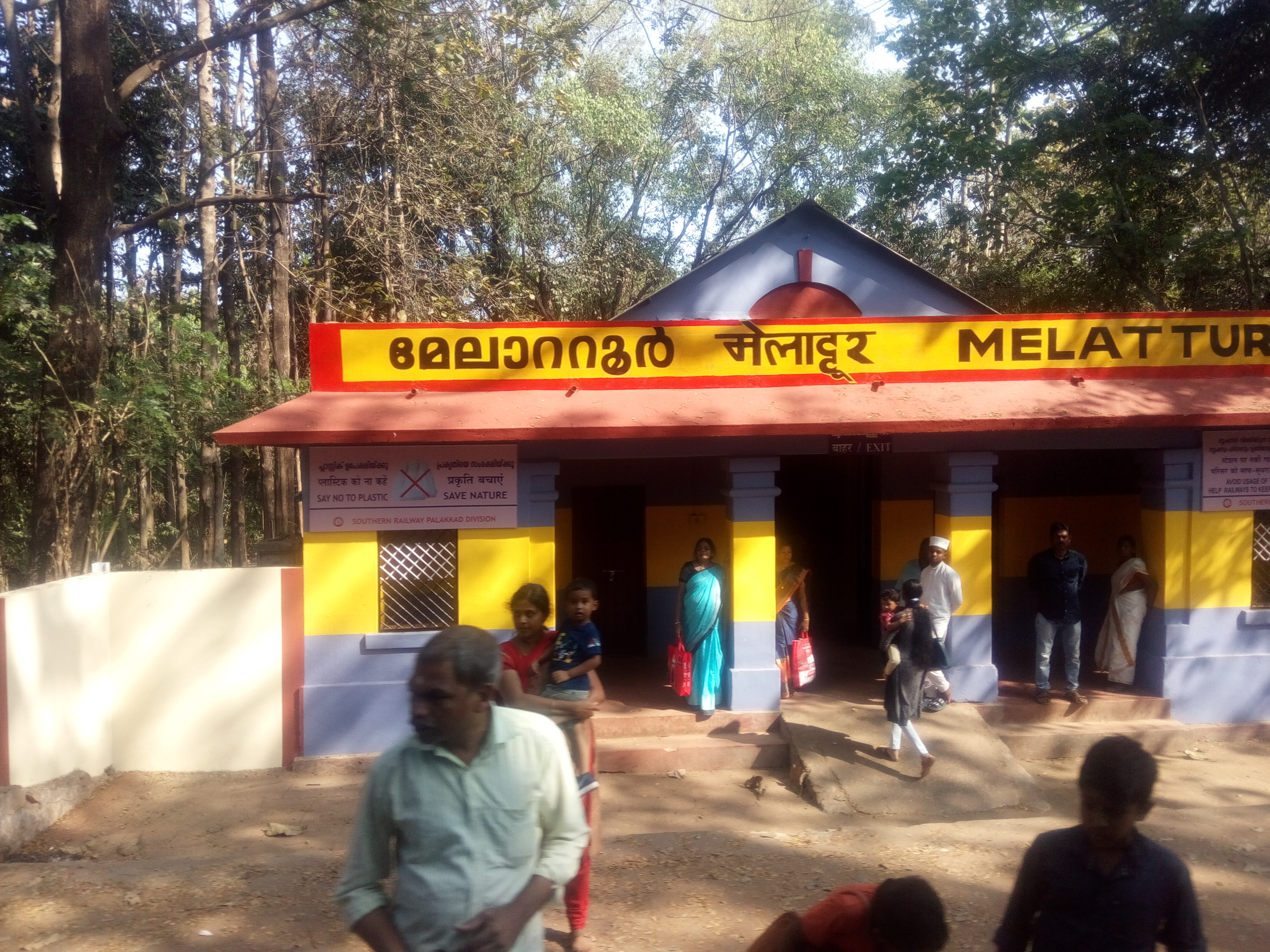
- Melattur Railway Station
- Nickname: MLTR
- Location in Kerala, India Melattur (India)
- Coordinates: 11.0600104°N 76.2747073°E
- Country: India
- State: Kerala
- District: Malappuram
- Taluk: Perinthalmanna

Government
  - Type: Gram Panchayat
  - Body: Melattur Panchayat
  - President: Ramseena Mujeeb (IUML)
  - Vice President: Ajith Prasad (UDF)

Languages
  - Official: Malayalam, English
- Time zone: UTC+5:30 (IST)
- PIN: 679326
- Telephone code: 04933
- Vehicle registration: KL-53
- State Assembly Constituency: Perinthalmanna
- Lok Sabha constituency: Malappuram
- Nearest Towns: Perinthalmanna (17km), Manjeri (23km), Mannarkkad (24km)
- Website: melatturpanchayat.lsgkerala.gov.in/ml

Melattur is a town in Malappuram district of Kerala. It is situated on the banks of the Velliyar river. The name Melattur came from the Malayalam words 'Mele' (above), 'Aaru' (river) and 'Ooru' (place); i.e., 'place near upstream'. There are places named Edayattur (place near middle of the river), and Keezhattur (place near to the downstream) on the banks of the river Olippuzha. The town is well connected to Perinthalmanna (17 km [11 mi]), Manjeri (23 km [14 mi]), Mannarkkad (24 km [15 mi]), Pandikkad (8 km [5.0 mi]) and Karuvarakundu (11 km [6.8 mi]) by road. Melattur Railway Station is a minor railway station on the Nilambur - Shornur Line.

== History ==
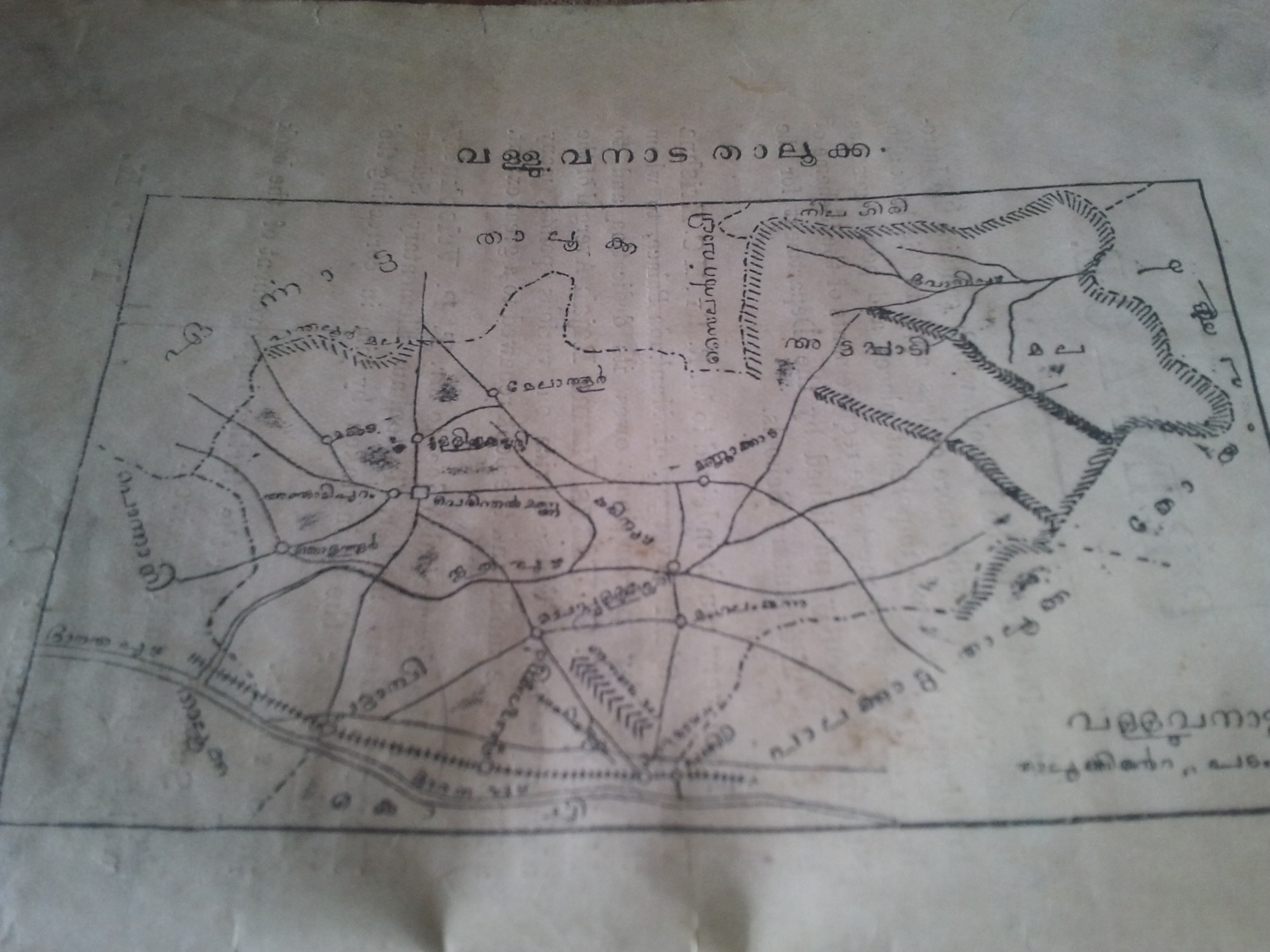
Valluvanad Taluk of Erstwhile Malabar District, AD 1909

This place was originally part of the Valluvanad Swaroopam dynasty.

Valluvanad was an erstwhile princely state in the present state of Kerala, that extended from the Nila River (Bharathappuzha) in the South to the Panthaloor Mala in the North. On the west, it was bounded by the Arabian Sea at Ponnani and on the east by the Attapadi Hills.

== Facilities ==
Government offices like Subregistrar Office, Educational Office, KSEB Office, Village and Panchayath Offices, Police Station, A Community Health Center, Ayurvedic Hospital, Unani Hospital, Krishibavan, PWD Area Office and several bank branches situated in melattur town itself. Melattur town is the center for several commercial shops and facilities. People from surrounding villages depend on Melattur for their day-to-day requirements.

== Education ==
A government-aided high school is situated in Melattur town, with secondary educational facility. A Private self-financing engineering college is also located near the town.

== Suburbs and villages ==
- Karuvarakkundu, Punnakkad and pavanapuram
- Iringattiri, Puthanazhi, Edapatta and manazhi
- Mythri Nagar, Eppikkad and Athani
- Uchoorakkadavu, Chemmaniyod and Manappady
- Vengur, Sahibpadi and Karyavattom
- Mannarmala, Pattikkad and Pooppalam

== Transportation ==
Road

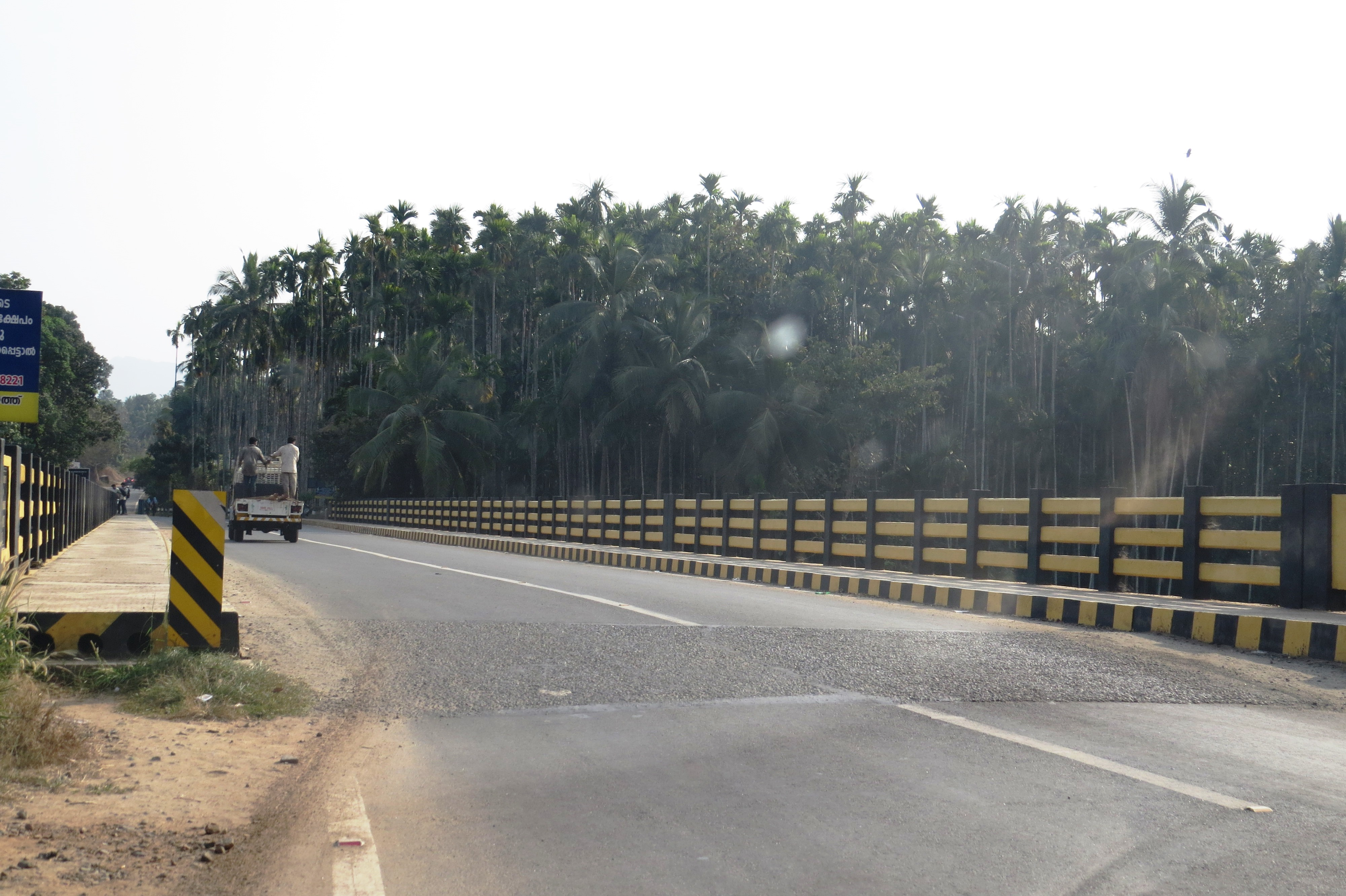
Melattur - Chemmaniyode Bridge

Melattur is situated on the Perumbilavu - Nilambur State Highway 39. Karuvarakundu - Melattur State Highway 70 ends at Melattur by joining Kumaramputhur - Olippuzha Road. Manjeri - Olippuzha - Kumaramputhur Road also passes through the town and one of the shortest route between Kozhikode and Palakkad is via Manjeri - Melattur - Mannarkkad.

From Melattur Panchayat bus stand, buses are available to Perinthalmanna, Pandikkad, Manjeri, Kozhikode, Mannarkkad, Palakkad, Coimbatore, Thuvvur, Edayattur, Karuvarakundu, Kalikavu, Nilambur, Edathanattukara, Moonadi, Kalpetta, Thamarassery, Pattambi, Vytilla Hub, Guruvayur, Thrissur and Kanjirappalli.

Rail

Melattur Railway Station is a minor Railway Station on the Nilambur - Shornur Line, trains are available from here to Nilambur, Shornur, Palakkad, Kottayam and Kochuveli.

== Important landmarks ==
- Melattur High school
- Ayamu Community Hall
- Paliative Care Center
- Vasudeva Library
- Puthanazhi Mosque
- Royal Unani Hospital
- Puthanazhi Medical Center
- Thathwamasy Manikanda Temple
- Kerala Gramin Bank Building
- Thottakkadakkavu Ayyappa Temple
- Loveline Convention Center
- Noorul Islam Highschool
- MEA Engineering College
- Jalaliya Juma Masjidh
- Pattikkad Juma Masjidh
- Jamia Nooriya Arabic College
- Irshad English School Melattur
- Melattur railway station
- Kaippully Vishnu-Vettekkaran Temple
- Njarakulagara Temple
- Puthiyedath Siva Temple
- Panayoor Mana
- Edayattur Juma Masjid
- Cholakkulam Juma Masjid
- Noorul Islam Madrasa, Cholakkulam
- DNMAUP School Edayattur
- Attuthrikovil Shiva Temple
- Areekkara Pathayappura Heritage home

== Notable people ==
- Akash S. Madhavan, Indian athlete who won medals in World Dwarf Games.
