= State Highway 26 (Kerala) =

Highway in Kerala, India

State Highway 26
- Nattukal - Velamthavalam Road
- SH 26 highlighted in red

Route information
- Maintained by Kerala Public Works Department
- Length: 11.6 km (7.2 mi)

Major junctions
- South end: SH 25 in Nattukal
- SH 52 in Nattukal
- North end: MDR at Tamil Nadu border in Velanthavalam

Location
- Country: India
- State: Kerala
- Districts: Palakkad

Highway system
- Roads in India; Expressways; National; State; Asian; State Highways in Kerala
← SH 25	→ SH 27

State Highway 26 (SH 26) is a state highway in Kerala, India that starts in Nattukal and ends in Velanthavalam. The highway is 11.6 km long.

== Route map ==
Nattukal junction - Palakkad - Pollachi road - Velanthavalam junction - road continues to Tamil Nadu

== See also ==
- Roads in Kerala
- List of state highways in Kerala
