= State Highway 23 (Kerala) =

Highway in Kerala, India

State Highway 23
- Shornur - Perinthalmanna Road
- SH 23 highlighted in red

Route information
- Maintained by Kerala Public Works Department
- Length: 39.3 km (24.4 mi)

Major junctions
- South end: SH 22 in Shoranur
- SH 39 in Pattambi; SH 60 in Cherukara; SH 53 in Perinthalmanna
- North end: NH 966 in Perinthalmanna

Location
- Country: India
- State: Kerala
- Districts: Palakkad, Malappuram

Highway system
- Roads in India; Expressways; National; State; Asian; State Highways in Kerala
← SH 22	→ SH 25

State Highway 23 (SH 23) is a state highway in Kerala, India that starts in Shoranur Railway Station and ends by joining National Highway 213 at Perinthalmanna. The highway is 39.3 km long.

== Route map ==
SH 23 Shornur Perinthalmanna Highway - Kulappuly - Vadanamkurussy - Ongallur - Manjalungal - Manappadi - Pattambi Joins SH 39

== Districts connected by state highway ==
Palakkad and Malappuram

== Townships on the state highway ==
Shournur, Pattambi and Perinthalmanna

== See also ==
- Roads in Kerala
- List of state highways in Kerala
