= State Highway 70 (Kerala) =

Highway in Kerala, India

State Highway 70
- Karuvarakundu -Melatttur Road
- SH 70 highlighted in red

Route information
- Maintained by Kerala Public Works Department
- Length: 9.82 km (6.10 mi)

Major junctions
- East end: SH 39 in Punnakkad Chungam
- West end: SH 39 in Melattur

Location
- Country: India
- State: Kerala
- Districts: Malappuram

Highway system
- Roads in India; Expressways; National; State; Asian; State Highways in Kerala
← SH 69	→ SH 71

State Highway 70 (SH 70) is a state highway in Kerala, India that starts in Punnakkad and ends in Melattur. The highway is 9.82 km long.

== Route map ==
Punnakkad – Edapatta – Melattoor (Joins Kumaramputhur - Olipuzha road)

== See also ==
- Roads in Kerala
- List of state highways in Kerala
