= State Highway 53 (Kerala) =

Highway in Kerala, India

State Highway 53
- Mundur - Cherplassery - Perinthalmanna Road
- SH 53 highlighted in red

Route information
- Maintained by Kerala Public Works Department
- Length: 48.1 km (29.9 mi)

Major junctions
- East end: NH 966 in Mundur
- West end: SH 23 in Perinthalmanna

Location
- Country: India
- State: Kerala
- Districts: Palakkad, Malappuram

Highway system
- Roads in India; Expressways; National; State; Asian; State Highways in Kerala
← SH 52	→ SH 54

State Highway 53 (SH 53) is a state highway in Kerala, India that starts in Mundur and ends by Perinthalmanna. The highway is 48.1 km long.

== Route map ==
Mundur junction - Kongad - Cherpulassery(Pattambi - Cherpulassery road joins) - Thootha - Perinthalmanna - joins SH 23

== See also ==
- Roads in Kerala
- List of state highways in Kerala
