= State Highway 75 (Kerala) =

Road in Kerala, India

State Highway 75
- Thrissur - Kanjani - Vadanappally Road
- SH 75 highlighted in red

Route information
- Maintained by Kerala Public Works Department
- Length: 16.12 km (10.02 mi)

Major junctions
- East end: in M. G. Road, Thrissur
- West end: NH 66 in Vadanappally

Location
- Country: India
- State: Kerala
- Districts: Thrissur

Highway system
- Roads in India; Expressways; National; State; Asian; State Highways in Kerala
← SH 74	→ SH 76

State Highway 75 (SH 75) is a State Highway in Kerala, India that starts in Thrissur and ends in Vadanappally. The highway is 16.12 km long.

== Route map ==
Thrissur - Olarikkara - Elthuruth - Kannapuram - Chettupuzha - Manakody - Kunnathangadi - Arimpoor - Kanjany -kandassankadavu- Vadanappally - Joins NH 66

== See also ==
- Roads in Kerala
- List of state highways in Kerala
