= Meenakshipuram, Palakkad =

Village in Kerala, India

Meenakshipuram
- Village
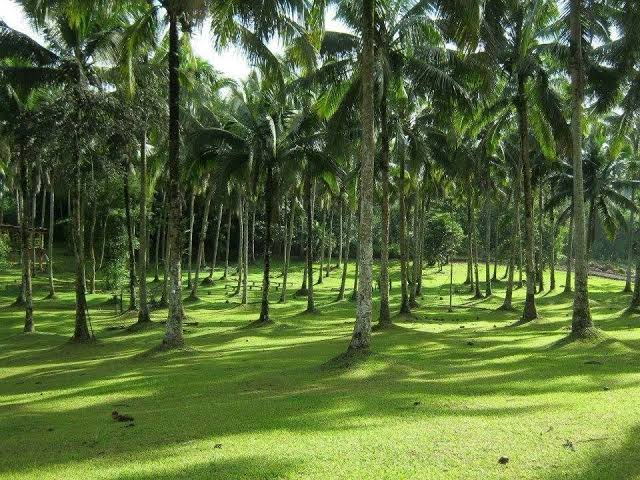
- Meenakshipuram amidst the Western Ghats

- Location in India
- Coordinates: 10.633°N 76.864°E
- Country: India
- State: Kerala

Government
  - Body: Perumatty Grama Panchayat

Population (2011)
  - Total: 9,764

Languages
  - Official: Malayalam, English
- Time zone: UTC+5:30 (IST)
- Postal code: 678533
- Vehicle registration: KL 70

Meenakshipuram is a village located in the Chittur Taluk of Palakkad district, Kerala, India. It lies approximately 34 kilometers east of the district headquarters, Palakkad, and about 11 kilometers from Chittur. The village is situated near the Kerala-Tamil Nadu border, approximately 16 kilometers from Pollachi in Tamil Nadu. Administratively, Meenakshipuram falls under the Perumatty Grama Panchayat and is part of the Chittur Assembly constituency and the Alathur Parliamentary constituency.

Meenakshipuram lies at approximately 10.633°N 76.8642°E. The village is surrounded by other settlements such as Nellimedu and Gopalapuram.

== Demographics ==
As of 2011, Meenakshipuram (Moolathara) had a population of 9764 individuals, comprising 4832 males and 4932 females. The size of the area is about 23.54 square kilometer.

== Infrastructure and facilities ==
The village is connected by local roads to nearby towns. The closest airport is Coimbatore International Airport. Meenakshipuram has a police station, which was upgraded from an outpost in 2013. The village has a government lower primary school and a government high school. Financial services are provided by branches of State Bank of India, Canara Bank, and Moolathara Service Co-operative Bank. Additionally, the village has a veterinary hospital and a post office.

== Education ==
Government High School, Meenakshipuram (GHS Meenakshipuram) was established in 1919 and provides education from grades 1 to 10. It is managed by the Department of Education, Government of Kerala.

== Postal services ==
The village uses the postal PIN code 678533.

== Economy and occupation ==
Meenakshipuram in Palakkad, Kerala, is known for its agricultural importance and the presence of an agricultural college, which contributes to the local economy and rural development. The region's economy is tied to tourism.

== Cultural aspects ==
The village is home to several religious institutions, including the Ramarpannai temple. These temples serve as cultural and spiritual centers for the local community, hosting festivals and rituals that attract residents and visitors from surrounding areas.
