= Cherukulam =

- village
- Location in Kerala, India Cherukulam (India)
- Coordinates: 11°7′0″N 76°10′0″E
- Country: India
- State: Kerala
- District: Malapuram

Languages
  - Official: Malayalam, English
- Time zone: UTC+5:30 (IST)
- Coastline: 0 kilometres (0 mi)
- Nearest city: Manjeri, Pandikkad
- Climate: Tropical monsoon (Köppen)
- Avg. summer temperature: 35 °C (95 °F)
- Avg. winter temperature: 20 °C (68 °F)

Cherukulam is a village in Malappuram district, Kerala.

== Transportation ==
Cherukulam village connects to other parts of India through Manjeri town. The nearest airport is at Kozhikode. The nearest major railway station is at Tirur.
