= Pazhayannur =

- Town
- Location in Kerala, India Pazhayannur (India)
- Coordinates: 10°41′6.055″N 76°25′19.714″E
- Country: India
- State: Kerala
- District: Thrissur

Government
  - Body: Pazhayannur Grama Panchayath

Population (2011)
  - Total: 16,688

Languages
  - Official: Malayalam, English
- Time zone: UTC+5:30 (IST)
- PIN: 680587
- Telephone code: 04884
- Vehicle registration: KL-08 & KL-48
- Nearest city: Pazhayannur
- Lok Sabha constituency: Alathur
- Vidhan Sabha constituency: Chelakkara

Pazhayannur is a town and panchayath in Thrissur district, in the state of Kerala, India. Palghat Mani Iyer, a mridangist, was born there.

== Demographics ==
As of 2011 India census, Pazhayannur had a population of 16,688 with 8,126 males and 8,562 females.
