= State Highway 68 (Kerala) =

Highway in Kerala, India

State Highway 68
- Kappad-Thusharagiri-Adivaram road
- SH 68 highlighted in red

Route information
- Maintained by Kerala Public Works Department
- Length: 68.11 km (42.32 mi)

Major junctions
- West end: in Kappad
- NH 66 in Thiruvangoor; SH 38 in Atholi; NH 766 in Koduvally; SH 34 in Omassery; SH 59 in Kodencheri
- East end: NH 766 in Adivaram

Location
- Country: India
- State: Kerala
- Districts: Kozhikode

Highway system
- Roads in India; Expressways; National; State; Asian; State Highways in Kerala
← SH 67	→ SH 69

State Highway 68 (SH 68) is a state highway in Kerala, India that starts in Kappad and ends in Adivaram. The highway is 68.11 km long.

== Route map ==
Kappad (Thiruvangoor ( NH 66)) - Atholi ( SH 38) - Nanminda – Narikkuni – Kavilummaram - Koduvally ( NH 766) – Omassery ( SH 34) - Kodencheri ( SH 59) - Thusharigiri - Adivaram (Chippilithode ( NH 766))

കാപ്പാട് (തിരുവങ്ങൂർ ( NH 66)) - അത്തോളി ( SH 38) - നന്മണ്ട - നരിക്കുനി - കാവിലുമ്മാരം - കൊടുവള്ളി ( NH 766) - ഓമശ്ശേരി ( SH 34) - കോടഞ്ചേരി ( SH 59) - തുഷാരഗിരി - അടിവാരം (ചിപ്പിലിത്തോട് ( NH 766))

== See also ==
- Roads in Kerala
- List of state highways in Kerala

Narikkuni - Kavilummaram - Koduvally Road is best route from Narikkuni to Koduvally
