= State Highway 28 (Kerala) =

Highway in Kerala, India

State Highway 28
- Kondotty - Nilambur - Gudallur Route
- SH 28 highlighted in red

Route information
- Maintained by Kerala Public Works Department
- Length: 65 km (40 mi)

Major junctions
- South-West end: NH 966 in Valluvambram
- SH 71 in Manjeri; SH 34 in Edavanna; SH 73 in Vadapuram
- North-East end: SH 12 north-east of TN border near Vazhikkadavu

Location
- Country: India
- State: Kerala
- Districts: Malappuram

Highway system
- Roads in India; Expressways; National; State; Asian; State Highways in Kerala
← SH 27	→ SH 29

State Highway 28 (SH 28) is a state highway in Kerala, India that starts at Valluvambram near Malappuram and ends at the state boundary. The highway is 65 km long.

== Route map ==
Valluvambram - Manjeri - Edavanna - Nilambur- - Edakkara - Vazhikadavu - State boundary

== See also ==
- Roads in Kerala
- List of state highways in Kerala
