= Perumpilavu =

Perumpilavu Perumpilavu
- Town
- Location in Kerala, India Perumpilavu (India)
- Coordinates: 10.698731°N 76.091942°E
- Country: India
- State: Kerala
- District: Thrissur

Languages
  - Official: Malayalam, English
- Time zone: UTC+5:30 (IST)
- PIN: 680519
- Telephone code: 04885
- Vehicle registration: KL-48
- Lok Sabha constituency: Alathur

Perumpilavu is a village located north of Kunnamkulam in Thrissur district, Kerala, India.
