= Kadachira =

- Census Town
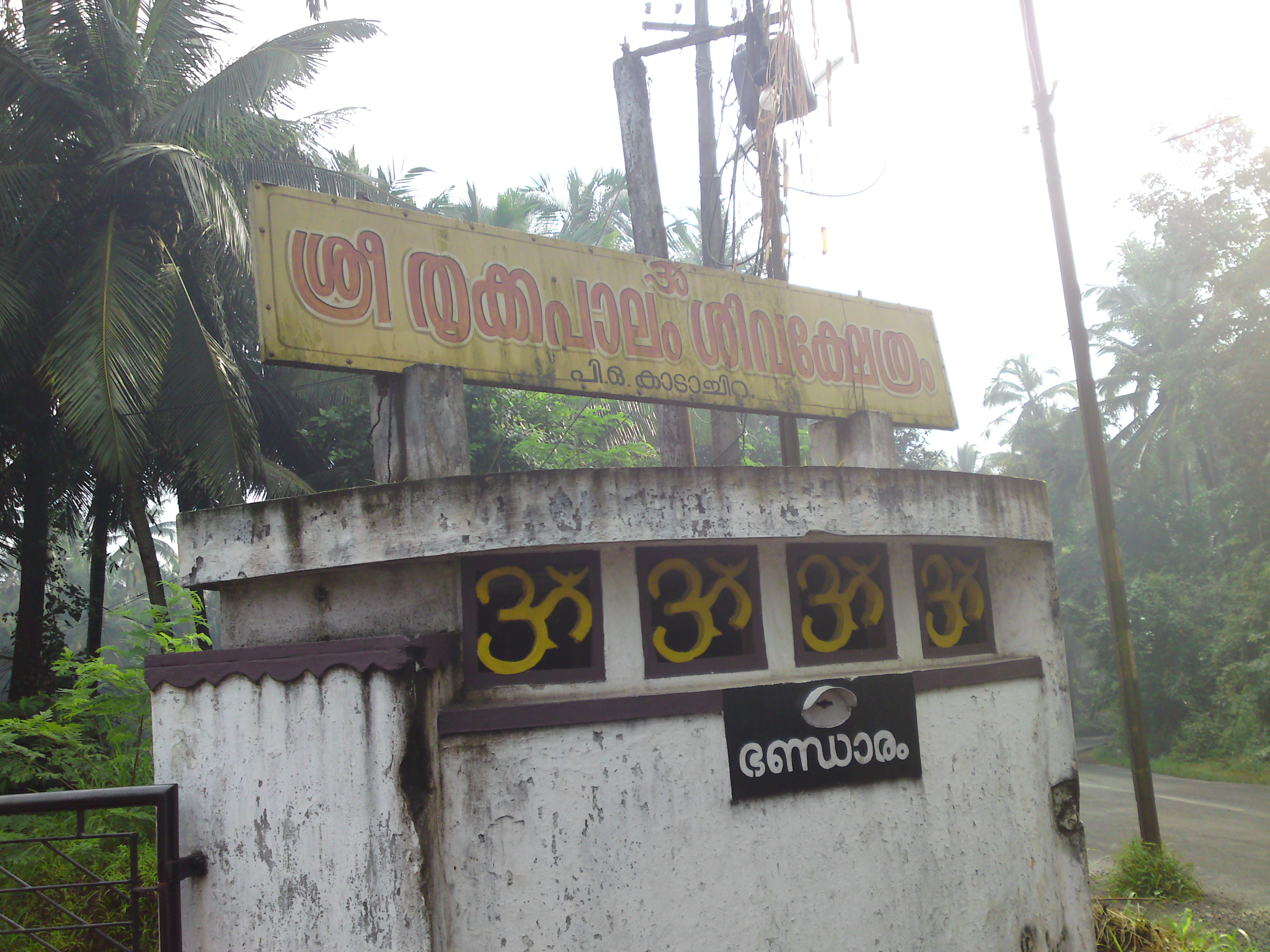
- Trikkapaalam Board

- Location in Kerala, India
- Coordinates: 11.8331728°N 75.4550242°E
- Country: India
- State: Kerala
- District: Kannur

Government
  - Body: Kadambur Grama Panchayat

Area
  - Total: 7.94 km^{2} (3.07 sq mi)

Population (2011)
  - Total: 18,979
  - Density: 2,390/km^{2} (6,190/sq mi)

Languages
  - Official: Malayalam, English
- Time zone: UTC+5:30 (IST)
- PIN: 670621
- ISO 3166 code: IN-KL

Kadachira is a census town and a suburb of Kannur city in Kannur district in the Indian state of Kerala. It is located 11 km (6.8 mi) southeast of Kannur city and part of Kadambur grama panchayat.

== Demographics ==
As of 2011 Census, Kadachira had a population of 18,979 with 8,698 (45.8%) males and 10,281 (54.2%) females. Kadachira census town have an area of 7.94 km^{2} (3.07 sq mi) with 4,127 families residing in it. The average sex ratio was 1182 higher than the state average of 1084. Kadachira has an average literacy rate of 97.7%, higher than the state average of 94%: male literacy was 98.8%, and female literacy was 96.8%. In Kadachira, 10.2% of the population was under 6 years of age.
