= State Highway 34 (Kerala) =

Highway in Kerala, India

State Highway 34
- Koyilandy – Edavanna Road
- SH 34 highlighted in red

Route information
- Maintained by Kerala Public Works Department
- Length: 44 km (27 mi)

Major junctions
- West end: NH 66 in Koyilandi
- SH 36 in Ulliyeri; NH 766 in Thamarassery; SH 68 in Omassery; SH 65 in Areacode
- East end: SH 28 in Edavanna

Location
- Country: India
- State: Kerala
- Districts: Kozhikkode, Malappuram

Highway system
- Roads in India; Expressways; National; State; Asian; State Highways in Kerala
← SH 33	→ SH 36

State Highway 34 (SH 34) is a state highway in Kerala, India that starts in Koyilandy and ends in Edavanna. The highway is 44.0 km long.

== Route map ==
Koyilandy town – Ulliyeri town – Balusseri town – Vattoli Bazaar – Ekarool – Poonoor town – Thamarassery – Omassery – Mukkam – Areekode joins SH 29 – Edavanna junction (joins Kozhikode – Nilambur – Gudalloor highway)

== See also ==
- Roads in Kerala
- List of state highways in Kerala
