= Sanctum sanctorum =

Latin translation of the Hebrew term Qṓḏeš HaQŏḏāšîm (Holy of Holies)

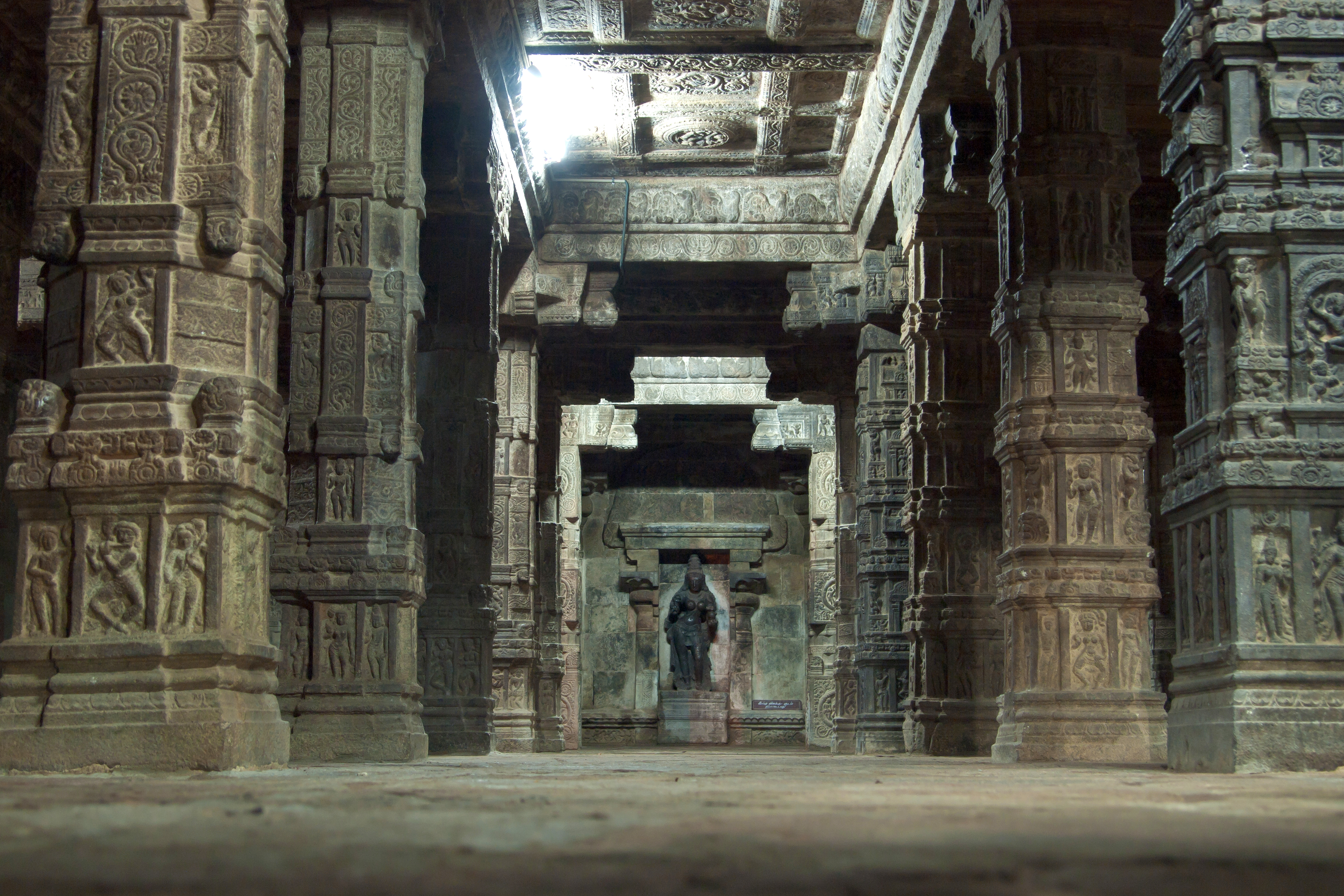
Sanctum sanctorum of Airavatesvara Temple, India

The Latin phrase sanctum sanctorum is a translation of the Hebrew term קֹדֶשׁ הַקֳּדָשִׁים (Qṓḏeš HaQŏḏāšîm), literally meaning Holy of Holies, in Latin texts, this generally refers to the holiest place of the Ancient Israelites, inside the Tabernacle and later inside the Temple in Jerusalem. However, the term also has some derivative use in application to imitations of the Tabernacle in church architecture.

The plural form sancta sanctorum is also used, arguably as a synecdoche, referring to the holy relics in the sanctuary. The Vulgate translation of the Bible uses sancta sanctorum for the Holy of Holies. Hence, the derivative usage denotes the Sancta Sanctorum chapel in the complex of the Archbasilica of Saint John Lateran, Rome.

The Garbhagriha in Hindu temples has been compared to a sanctum sanctorum, and is sometimes translated into English as such.

== Etymology ==
The Latin word sanctum is the neuter form of the adjective "holy," and sanctorum is its genitive plural. Thus, the term sanctum sanctorum literally means "the holy [place/thing] of the holy [places/things]," replicating in Latin the Hebrew construction for the superlative, with the intended meaning "the holiest [place/thing]."

== Use of the term in modern languages ==
The Latin word sanctum may be used in English, following Latin, for "a holy place" or a sanctuary, as in the novel Jane Eyre (1848), which refers to "the sanctum of the schoolroom."

Romance languages tend to use sancta sanctorum, treating it as masculine and singular. E.g., the Spanish dictionary of the Real Academia Española admits sanctasanctórum (without the space and with an accent) as a derivative Spanish noun denoting both the Holy of Holies in the Temple in Jerusalem, any secluded and mysterious place and something that a person holds in the highest esteem.

The term is still often used by Indian writers for the garbhagriha or inner shrine chamber in Hindu temple architecture, after being introduced by British writers in the 19th century.

== German Catholic processions ==
Some regional branches of the Catholic Church, e.g., Germans, are wont to refer to the Blessed Sacrament when adored in the tabernacle or exposition or procession (e.g., on Corpus Christi) as the Holy of Holies. By custom, it is adorned with genuflection; with a double genuflection, that is a short moment of kneeling on both knees, if in exposition; in the procession, this ritual may be nonrigoristically alleviated, but at least a simple genuflection is appropriate when It is elevated by the priest for blessing or immediately after transubstantiation. Personnel in uniform — which in Germany includes student corporations — give the military salute when passing by or in the moment of elevation.

== The "enclosed house" of Hindu temple architecture ==
The garbhagriha in Hindu temple architecture (a shrine inside a temple complex where the main deity is installed in a separate building inside the complex) has also been compared to a "sanctum sanctorum" in texts on Hindu temple architecture. However, Sanskrit means "enclosed house" or "the deep interior of the house." However, some Indian English authors seem to have translated the Sanskrit term literally as "womb house."

== See also ==
- In saecula saeculorum – Phrase expressing the idea of eternity
