= Kunduthode =

- village
- Location in Kerala, India Kunduthode (India)
- Coordinates: 11.670°N 75.817°E
- Country: India
- State: Kerala
- District: Kozhikode

Languages
  - Official: Malayalam, English
- Time zone: UTC+5:30 (IST)
- Postal code: 673513
- Vehicle registration: KL-77 Perambra

Kunduthode is a small village in northeastern Kozhikode district, Kerala, in southwest India. It is under Nadapuram assembly constituency and Kavilumpara panchayath. The nearest town is Thottilpalam (6 km).

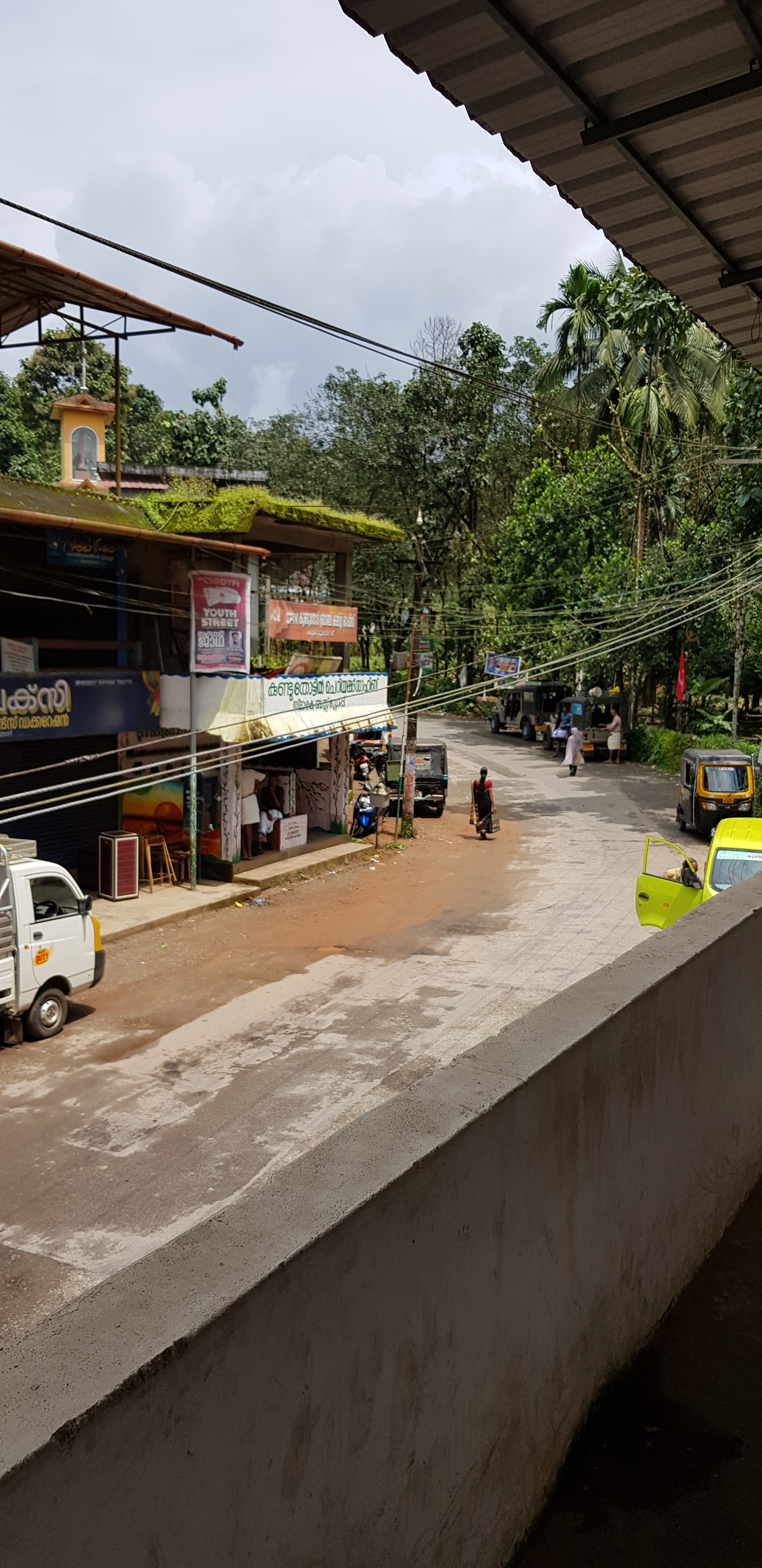
Town

== Panchayat administration ==
Kunduthode is under Kavilumpara grama panchayath.

- President= P G George CPI(M)

== History ==
In the pre independence era, Kunduthode was under British Governorship. There were large rubber producing estates in Kunduthode in 1916. Rubber cultivation begins with the establishment of rubber estate in Kunduthod area by Piers Lasley Company 1916's. During this period they had built a bungalow in the middle of estate. Workers at the rubber estates began to settle nearby and around, Migration started here in the 1930s and the population began to increase.

Most of the people in this region are farmers and agricultural laborers with good soil and water availability for agriculture. All the agricultural crops like coconut, courgette and rubber are present in this area. The surrounding mountains like a fort add to the natural beauty of this place. Beyond the eastern mountains is the Wayanad Pass. It is also an area with good rainfall due to its forests and mountains.Kunduthode agricultural sector is climbing the ladder of progress with migration from Travancore.The primary source of revenue in this area is agriculture. The primary crops used for agriculture include rubber, bananas, ginger, pepper, coconut, and cassava. Spices are renowned in this region. This region also produces mace, cloves, nutmeg, and cinnamon. Vanilla is another plant that has been grown recently.

Kunduthdode is also famous for high-yielding Kuttiady coconut trees.

== Transportation ==
- Kunduthode is well connected by road network with nearby places. A KSRTC Bus Depot and private Bus stand is situated in the nearest town Thottilpalam (6 km). The main bus services are to Kozhikode, Vatakara, Bangalore, Mananthavady, Thalasserry Palakkad, Ernakulam Kottayam. Local Transportation is mainly with Jeep, auto and buses
- Airport – Calicut International Airport is 86 km away. (Karippur - Kozhikode - Perambra - Kuttiady - Thottilpalam)
- Kannur international airport – 65 km away
- Nearest Railway Station – Vatakara railway station 36 km Away.

== How to reach by road ==
- Kozhikode – Ulliyeri-perambra-Kuttiady-Thottilpalam-Kunduthode
- Vatakara – Orkkatteri-Nadapuram-Kuttiady-Thottilpalam-Kunduthode
- Thalassery – Peringathoor-Nadapuram-Thottilpalam-Kunduthode
- Mananthavadi – Vellamunda-Niravilpuzha-Thottilpalam-Kunduthode

== Geography ==
Kunduthode is an area of plain and hills.

== Economy ==
Kunduthode is one of the major agricultural areas in Kozhikode district. The main cash crops are: Cloves (Grambu), nutmeg, coconut, areca nut, ginger, turmeric, and pepper. Many others are engaged in business and other jobs. There are hotels, banks, and rubber plantations in Kunduthode.

== Government Offices ==
- Primary Health center Kunduthode
- Postal office
- Public ration shop

== Cultural ==
- Public library
- Payas kalavedi

== Hospitals ==
- Primary Health center

Further hospital services are available in Thottilpalam(4 km)

== Religious ==
- St. Joseph Church
- Elakkandi Mahadeva Temple
- Vannathiyetu Guruvayoorappan temple
- Himayathul Islam Juma Masjid

== Educational Institutes ==
- PTChako Memorial HS Kunduthodu
- Govt LP school Kunduthode
- St. Jose LP School
- Himayauthul Islam madrasa
- Hidayathu Sibiyan Sunni Madrasa

== See also ==
- Vatakara
- Nadapuram
- Perambra
- Madappally
- Villiappally
- Memunda
- Iringal
- Mahe, Pondicherry
- Payyoli
- Thikkodi
- Orkkatteri
