= Thodannur =

Thodannur Thodannur Thodannur
- village
- Location within Kerala Location within India
- Coordinates: 11.58°N 75.65°E
- Country: India
- State: Kerala
- District: Kozhikode
- Block Panjayath: Thodannur
- Panjayath: Thiruvallur
- Village: Kottappally
- Taluk: Vatakara

Government
  - Member of Parliament: K. Muraleedharan
  - Member of Legislative Assembly: K. P. Kunhammed Kutti

Languages
  - Official: Malayalam, English
- Time zone: UTC+5:30 (IST)
- PIN: 673541
- Telephone code: +91, (0)496
- Lok Sabha constituency: Vatakara
- Legislative assembly constituency: Kuttyadi

Thodannur is a village in thiruvallur grama panchayath, Vatakara taluk, Kozhikode district of Kerala in India. Thodannur block panchayath consists of Ayanchery, Maniyur, palayad, kottappalli, thiruvallur, and villiappally villages.

== Schools ==
School	Syllabus	Distance
Thodannur UP School	Kerala state	450 m
Thodannur MLP School	Kerala state	500 m
Vidyaprakash Public School	CBSE	1.5 km

== Nearest railway stations ==
Railway Station	Code	Distance
Vadakara railway station	BDJ	8.5 km
Kozhikode (Calicut Main) railway station	CLT	53 km
Kannur railway station	CAN	51 km
Koyilandy railway station	QLD	26 km
Thalassery railway station	TLY	30 km

== Nearest airports ==
AIRPORT	IATA	ICAO	Distance
Kannur International Airport	CNN	VOKN	56 km
Calicut International Airport	CCJ	VOCL	75 km

== Schools near Thodannur ==
no:	name
1	Thodannur UP School
2	Thodannur MLP School
3	Thiruvallur North LP School
4	Keezhal UP School
5	Memunda HSS
6	SNSS Thiruvallur
7	Chemmarathur LP School
8	Chemmarathur West LP School
9	Chemmarathur MLP School
10	Mandarathur LP School
11	Mandarathur UP School
12	KEZHAL Devi Vilasam UP School

== See also ==
- Orkkatteri
- Nadapuram
- Thottilpalam
- Perambra
- Madappally
- Villiappally
- Memunda
- Iringal
- Mahe, Pondicherry
- Payyoli
- Thikkodi
