= Akalapuzha Lake =

Lake in Kerala, India

Akalapuzha
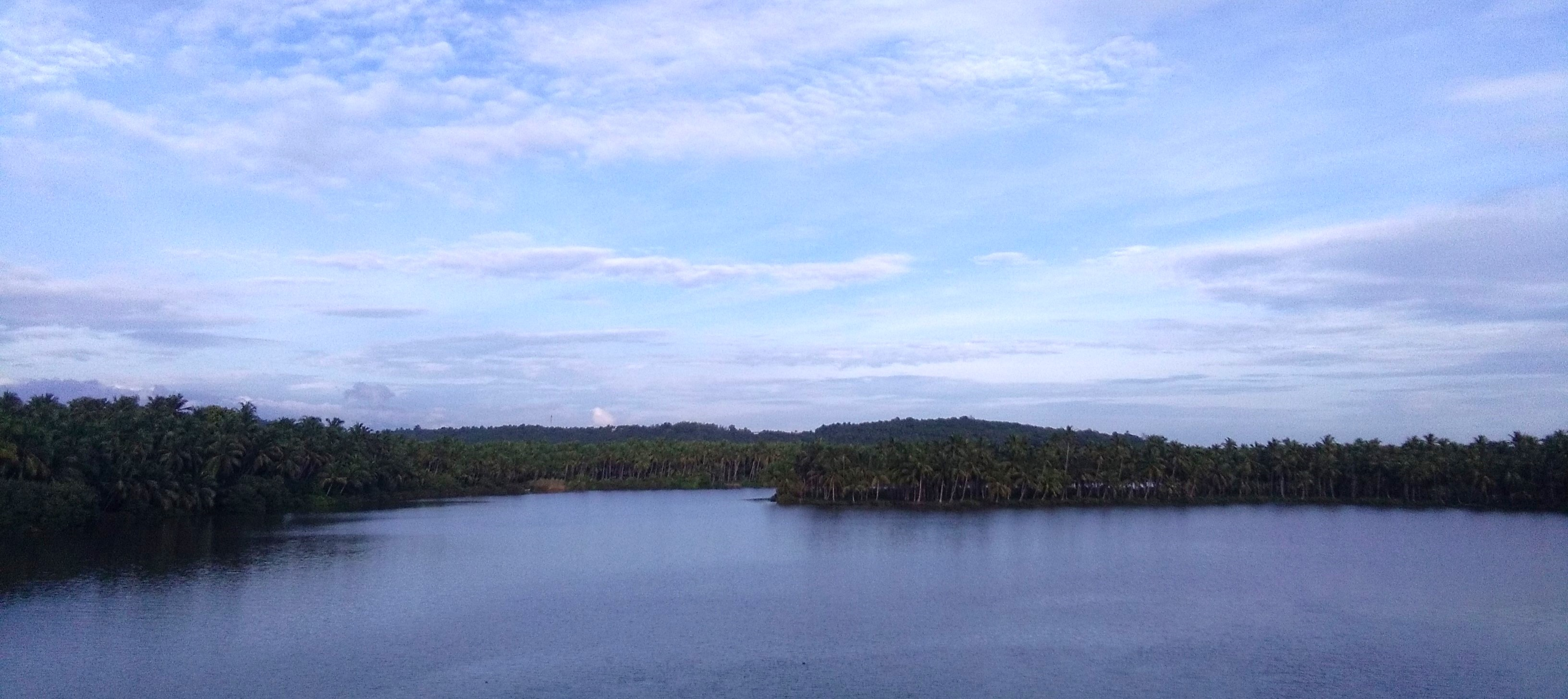
- Akalapuzha from Nelliyadi Kadavu Bridge, Keezhariyur

- Location in Kerala
- Location: Koyilandy, Kozhikode, Kerala, India
- Coordinates: 11°30′45″N 75°39′23″E
- Primary inflows: Payyoli Canal
- Primary outflows: Muthambi River
- Basin countries: India
- Surface area: 5 km^{2} (1.9 sq mi)
- Shore length^{1}: 22 km (14 mi)
- Islands: 3 Nelliyadi Thuruthu Edison Thuruth
- ^{1} Shore length is not a well-defined measure.

Akalapuzha (Malayalam: അകലാപ്പുഴ) is a lake situated in the Kozhikode, Kerala. Flowing as a distributary of Korapuzha from Kanayankodu in Koyilandy, Akalapuzha flows northwest to meet the Kuttiyadipuzha at Payyoli Chirp (Payyoli Canal).

== Etymology ==
As per the Malabar Manual by William Logan, the name Akalapuzha was derived from 'Akalamulla Puzha' (അകലമുള്ള പുഴ), meaning 'river with distance'. Thurayur near Akalapuzha was a port town during the British reign in India and the water transport was very active in the lake until the end of twentieth century. It is known as the Kuttanad of Kozhikode.

== Geography ==
The Payyoli Canal (200 metres [660 ft]) connects Akalapuzha lake with its tributary Kuttiyadi Puzha. It is situated between the Koyilandy and Payyoli municipalities and Thikkodi and Keezhariyur villages. It flows towards Korapuzha river as Muthambi River.

It is a part of the planned Kovalam-Bekal Waterway. The Nelliyadi Kadavu Bridge was constructed over Akalapuzha connecting Koyilandy Municipality to Keezhariyur village and was inaugurated by the then Chief Minister of Kerala, Mr. E K Nayanar on January 30, 2000.

SARBTM Govt. College Koyilandy is located on the shore of Akalapuzha.

== Tourism ==
It is a major tourist spot with boat services and leisure activities.

The Pamban thuruth is a known place among the film industry. Akalapuzha started receiving attention by the release of the Malayalam movie Theevandi.

This lake is shallow and home to many fishes, including shellfish. The Karimeen (Pearl Spot) nurtured in the Akalappuzha Backwaters are often an evening delicacy.

Fishing using fishing rods from the Nelliyadi Kadavu Bridge is a popular activity among the people around this region.

The Akalapuzha boating point is close to NH66 and can be reached by travelling 6 km (3.7 mi) from Payyoli Town, 5 km (3.1 mi) from Thikkodi or 8 km (5.0 mi) from Sree Pisharikavu Temple.

Nearby tourist attractions include:

- The Microwave viewpoint is 8 km (5.0 mi) from the boating point and provides a view of the lake from hilltop
- The Kadalur Point Lighthouse is 7 km (4.3 mi) away from Akalappuzha boating point
- 6 km (3.7 mi) from Thikkodi Drive in Beach
- 6 km (3.7 mi) from Kollam Chira
- 6 km (3.7 mi) from Kodikkal Beach Volleyball Court
- 10 km (6.2 mi) from Parapally beach, Kollam
- 18 km (11 mi) from Kappad Beach
- Kadalundi Bird Sanctuary

== Connectivity ==
Nearest railway station: Thikkodi (7.5 km [4.7 mi]), Payyoli (8.5 km [5.3 mi]), Koyilandy Railway Station (11 km [6.8 mi]), Vadakara Railway Station (15 km [9.3 mi]), Kozhikode Railway Station (36 km [22 mi])

Nearest airport: Calicut International Airport (60 km [37 mi]), Kannur International Airport (63 km [39 mi])

== Nearby villages and towns ==
Keezhariyur (east), Thurayur (north), Payyoli (northwest), Thikkodi (west), Viyyur(Koyilandy) (west).
