= Thottilpalam =

- Town
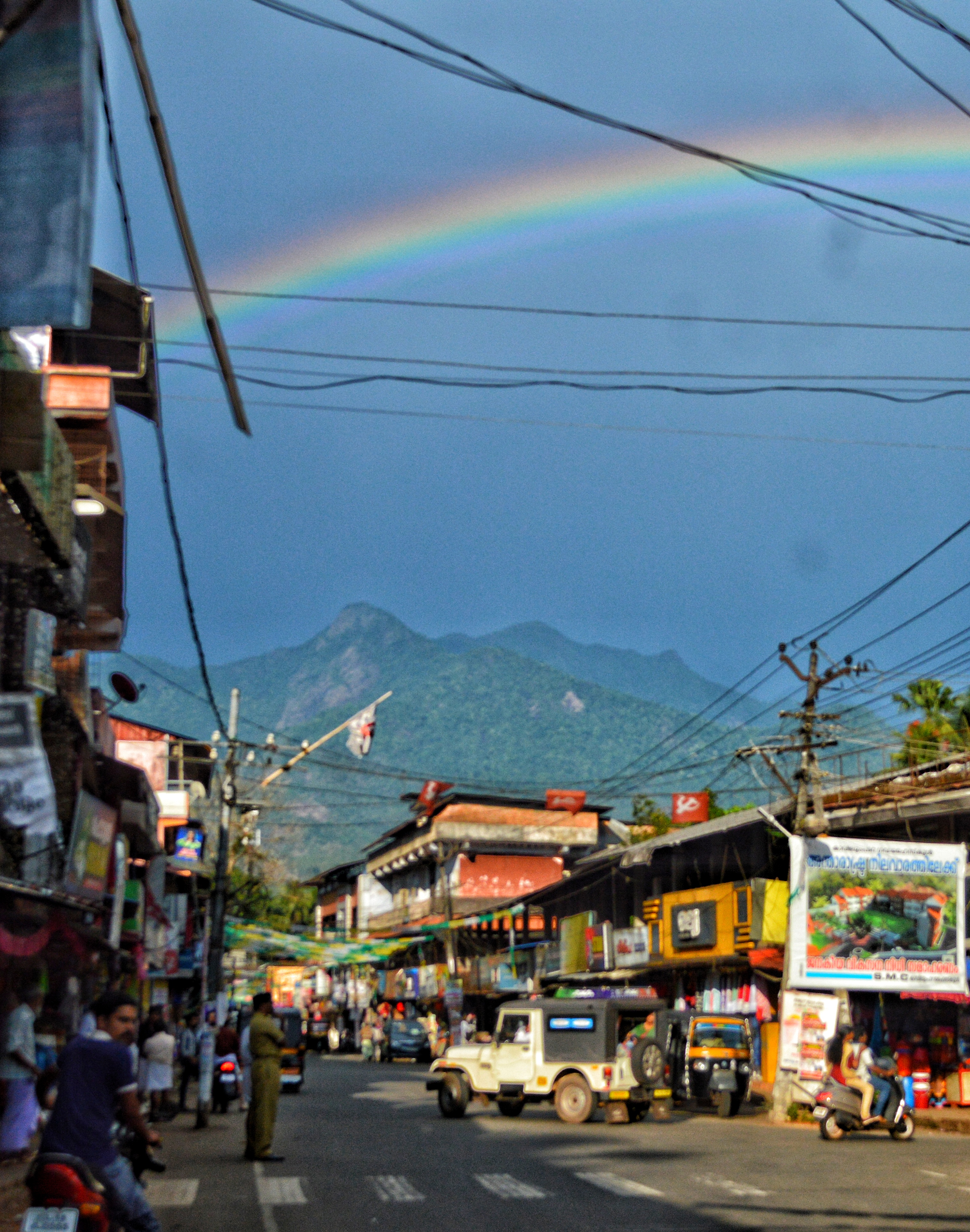

- Location in Kerala, India Thottilpalam (India)
- Coordinates: 11.6775°N 75.7800°E
- Country: India
- State: Kerala
- District: Kozhikode

Languages
  - Official: Malayalam, English
- Time zone: UTC+5:30 (IST)
- Postal code: 673513
- Vehicle registration: KL-77 (Perambra SRTO)

Thottilpalam is one of the major town in north east of Kozhikode district, Kerala. State Highway 54 to Wayanadu district passes through this town. It is 29 km from Vatakara and 5 km from Kuttiady. Thottilpalam is the main town in Kavilumpara panchayath. Town is situated at the bottom of Kuttiady Churam. Arjuna Award winner Tom Joseph is from Thottilpalam. The town is under Thottipalam police station.

== Etymology ==
The term Thottil has the meaning cradle and the term Palam means bridge in Malayalam. According to local tradition there was a cradle shaped bridge built across the Kuttiady River, by the British East India Company, to move their goods easily from the Estate in Kunduthode to the Tellichery.

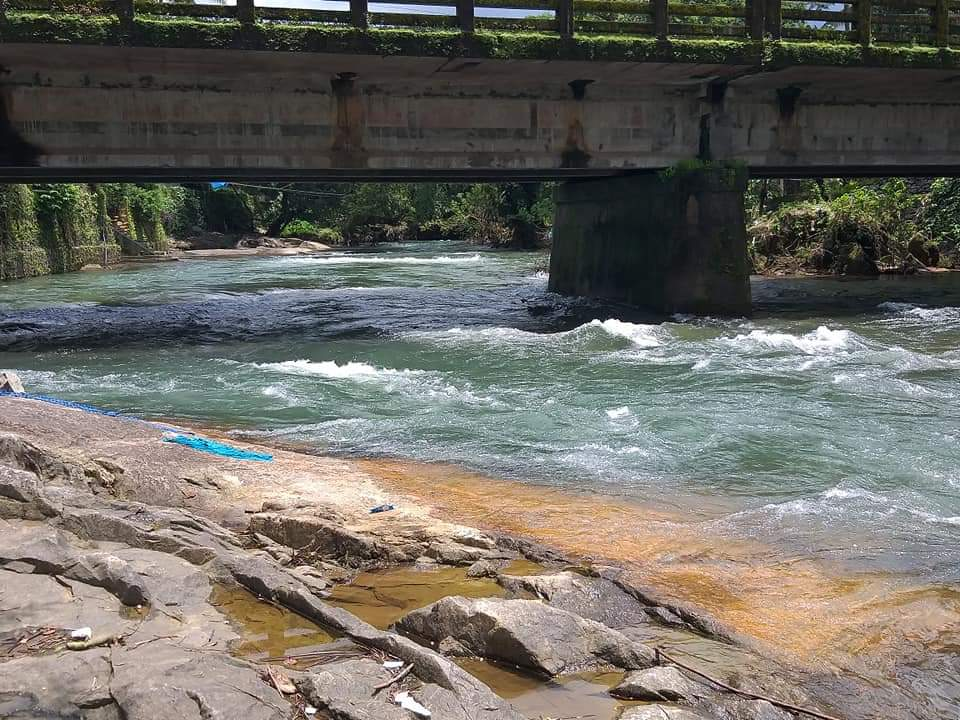
Bridge

== Economy ==
Thottilpalam is one of the major agricultural areas in Kozhikode district. The main cash crops are: Cloves(Grambu) Nutmeg, coconut, areca nut, ginger, turmeric, and pepper. So this area is called as Malayoram. As Thottilpalam is the foothills of Malayoram,. Many others are engaged in business and other jobs. Hotels, Restaurants, Petrol pumps, ATM's, Hospitals, Banks, Police Station and other major offices are located in town. And a vanitha co-operative society is there in economy sector at Thottilpalam.

== See also ==
- Vatakara
- Nadapuram
- Perambra
- Madappally
- Villiappally
- Memunda
- Iringal
- Mahe, Pondicherry
- Payyoli
- Thikkodi
- orkkatteri
- Chathangottunada
- Poothampara
