= Valiacode =

- village
- Location in Kerala, India Valiacode (India)
- Coordinates: 11.575898°N 75.73391°E
- Country: India
- State: Kerala
- District: Kozhikode

Languages
  - Official: Malayalam, English
- Time zone: UTC+5:30 (IST)
- PIN: 673 524
- Vehicle registration: KL-11
- Website: www.kozhikode.nic.in

Valiacode is a small village of Kozhikode district in Nochad gramapanchayath. It is in Perambra assembly constituency and Vatakara Lok sabha constituency.

== Education ==
Valiacode AUP school is in Thamarassery educational district and is in the heart of Valiacode. This school conducts classes from LKG to seventh. This school provides the opportunity to study for students from nearest areas like Nochad, Akkoopparambu, Edakkayil. Twenty-nine teachers serve more than 600 pupils.

== Location ==
Valiacode is well connected with Nochad, Meppayyur and Perambra, the main towns of the region, by road. Perambra to Vatakara State Highway passes through the center of Valiacode. The nearest airport is Calicut International Airport and the nearest railway station is Koyilandy.

== Economy ==
People here are mainly engaged in agriculture mainly paddy, banana and tapioca. Coconut farming also is a main source of income. The canal from Peruvannamoozhi is a major attraction and a consolation for the farmers there. Many people from Valiacode work in the Gulf countries, a major source of income.

== Transportation ==
Valiacodevillage connects to other parts of India through Vatakara city on the west and Kuttiady town on the east. National highway No.66 passes through Vatakara and the northern stretch connects to Mangalore, Goa and Mumbai. The southern stretch connects to Cochin and Trivandrum. The eastern Highway going through Kuttiady connects to Mananthavady, Mysore and Bangalore. The nearest airports are at Kannur and Kozhikode. The nearest railway station is at Vatakara.
