= Puttad =

Coordinates: 11°32′N 75°46′E

- village
- Interactive map of Puttad
- Country: India
- State: Kerala
- District: Kozhikode

Languages
  - Official: Malayalam, English
- Time zone: UTC+5:30 (IST)
- PIN: 673525
- Vehicle registration: KL-
- Nearest city: Kozhikode
- Lok Sabha constituency: Vatakara
- Climate: Tropical monsoon (Köppen)
- Avg. summer temperature: 35 °C (95 °F)
- Avg. winter temperature: 20 °C (68 °F)

Puttad(പുറ്റാട്) is a village in Koyilandy sub-district, about 5 km (3.1 mi) south of Perambra in Kozhikode district, Kerala, India.

== Economy ==
People here are mainly engaged in agriculture such as paddy, banana and tapioca. Coconut farming also is a major source of income. Many people from Puttad work abroad.

== Educational institutions ==
Schools

- Puttad G.L.P School
- Nochat Higher Secondary School
- Valoor G.U.P School

== Places of interest ==
- Sree. Cherukunnu Thalachilon-Paradevatha Temple
- Cherukashi Shiva Temple
- Sree Muthappan Temple, Valoor

== Transportation ==
Puttad village connects to other parts of India through Koyilandy town. The nearest airports are at Kannur and Kozhikode. The nearest railway station is at Koyliandy. The national highway no. 66 passes through Koyilandy and the northern stretch connects to Mangalore, Goa and Mumbai. The southern stretch connects to Cochin and Trivandrum. The eastern National Highway No.54 going through Kuttiady connects to Mananthavady, Mysore and Bangalore.
