= List of educational institutions in Vatakara =

== Colleges ==
- College of Engineering, Vatakara (CAPE, Govt. of Kerala)
- Govt College Madappally
- Govt college Nadapuram
- MES college Vatakara, Memunda
- MBA Centre Karimbanapalam NH, Vatakara
- Center For Computer Science and Information Technology, University of Calicut (Formerly MCA Centre Vatakara)
- Community College of IGNOU at Maniyoor

== Schools ==
- Cherapuram U P School, Theekuni
- Cherapuram New L P School, Kakkuni
- Velam H.S.S. Velam
- Valayam U P School, Valayam
- govt:UPschool nadapuram (established in 1913)
- Govt higher secondary school, Kallachi
- Govt:up school Kallachi
- Northnadapuram MLP school
- Arakkilad east LP school
- Muttungal South UP school (MSUP)-Chorode
- Nallomkorol MLP School Ayancheri
- Amrutha Public School, Vatakara
- Amritha Vidyalaya, Vatakara
- National H.S.S.Vattoli
- Sanskrit H.S.Vattoli
- Govt. U.P School, Vattoli
- Govt. L.P School, Vattoli
- Hi-Tech Public School, Vattoli
- Vyasa Vidya Peedom, Vattoli
- National English Medium, Vattoli
- Memunda Higher Secondary School, Memunda
- Meppayil S B School, Vatakara
- BEM High School, Vatakara
- Govt.JNM higher Secondary School, Puthuppanam
- Javahar Navodaya Vidyalaya, Vatakara, Palayad Nada (PO)
- Government Technical High School, Vatakara.
- Govt.higher secondary school, Vatakara, Puthoor (PO) (BTS)
- Emjay V H S S Villiappalli, Villiappalli.
- Katameri M.U.P School, Katameri
- Kadathanad Rajas High School, Purameri
- ChiraVattam LP School Memunda
- Memunda East LP School
- RAC Higher Secondary School, Katameri
- Rahmaniya High School, Ayancheri
- Shanthi Niketan School, Thiruvalloor
- Govt Higher Secondary School, Chorode
- Vidya Prakash Public School, Thodannoor
- Govt. Sanskrit Higher Secondary School, Meppayil
- Sree Narayana English High School, Vatakara [English Medium]
- Rani Public School, Chorode, Vatakara (English medium)
- Sree Gokulam Public School, kurikilad, Vatakara (English medium)
- Islamic Academy English High School, Kottakkal
- St. Anthony's Girls High School, Vatakara
- MET Public School, Kallachi
- Government Fisheries Higher Secondary School (boys & girls), Madappally
- Manarul Ulum Madrassa High School, Thazhe Angadi
- K.Kunhirama Kurup Memorial Government Higher Secondary School, Orkkatery
- Maniyur Panchayath Higher Secondary School, Palayad Nada
- Govt. Higher Secondary School Orkkattery, Eramala.
- Karakkadu L.P School Nadapuram Road
- Athma Vidya Sangam L P School Madappally
- Govt H.S Madappally
- Mopila school LP Madappally
- Avikkal Senior Basic School, Avikkal
- Elayadam M.U.P School, Elayadam
- Technical High School, Vatakara
- shanthinikethan English School, Customs road, vatakara
- M.U.M High School, Thazhe Angadi, Vatakara
- ES school, Orkateri
- Mopila School, Orkateri
- Puthur J B school, Vatakara
- Meppayil East J B school, vatakara
- Meppayil East Senior Basic School (MESBS), Vatakara
- IPC English Scholl, Payyoli & Maniyoor
- Chettiyaath UP School, Puthuppanam
- Ponniath mopla UP School, Keezhal
- Onchiyam L P School, Vatakara
- Onchiyam Government U P School, Vatakara
- Arur U P School, Arur. established-1911
- SGMSB school, Nut street Vatakara
- Saraswathi Vilasam School, Arakkilad
- Shivananda Vilasam J B School, Vatakara
- Senior Basic School, Puthuppnam, Vatakara
- Salafi public school nadapuram, Vatakara
- Jr. Basic School, Pakkayil, Vatakara.
- Kelappaji Memorial School.[English Medium].
- Ideal Business school, Behind K.S.E.B, New Bus stand, Vatakara
- Government higher secondary school Kallachi
- Government higher secondary school Velliyodu
- Crescent high school Vanimal
- Eramala Central L.P. School Eramala
- Eramala U.P. School Eramala
- Vanimal Mappila UP School
- Mandarathoor U.P.school, Mandarathoor
- Mandarathoor M.L.P school, Mandarathoor
- Chennamangalam L.P school, Chorode
- Gayathri Vidhya Bavan, Vatakara
- Harisree Vidhya Nikethan, Aravindhagosh, Puthuppanam, Vatakara
- Fanar Indigenous School, Nut Street, Vatakara
- Model Technical Higher Secondary School, M.Y.M. Campus, Nadapuram
- Bright School Valliad
- St.Antony's Girls High School, Vatakara

== Professional colleges ==
- Modal Polytechnic College (IHRD) Vatakara, Vatakara

== Tuition centres ==
- Steps Entrance Coaching Centre
- TENSOR (Centre for Science & Technology Education), Vatakara
- MIDET
- New Jyothi Arts and Science College
- Institute of Calligraphy
- ACE Vatakara, Edodi
- Victory Vatakara Puduppanam
- Acharya College Vatakara
- Arabindo Institute Vatakara
- Sciencentre
- Indus College
- RIMS College of Maths and science
- Einstien Institute

== Entrance coaching centres ==
- TENSOR (Centre for Science & Technology Education), Vatakara
- Sciencecentrem Edodi, Vatakara
- RIMS College of Maths and Science, Edodi, Vatakara

== Calligraphy ==
- Institute of Calligraphy
