= Poozhithodu Weir =

Dam in Kerala, India

Coordinates: 11°39′4″N 75°51′48″E

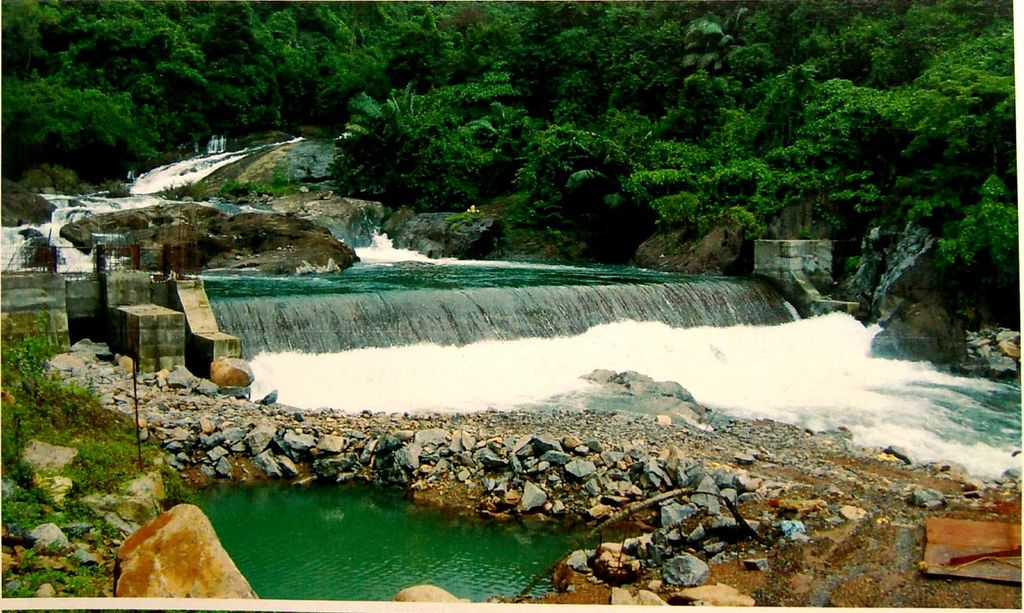
Poozhithodu Barrage

Poozhithodu Weir is a small diversion dam in Kavilumpara panchayath in Maruthomkara village of Kozhikode district in Kerala, India. This project is a run – off the river scheme utilizing water from Illiani puzha and Kadanthrapuzha . It is 61 km away from Kozhikode and near to Perambra town.The weir is constructed across Kadanthrapuzha. The weir is a 6 metres (20 ft) high and 57 metres (187 ft) long concrete Gravity type dam. Water from the weir is directed through a channel which is 790 meter in length to a forebay tank. From there the weter is taken to Poozhithode Power station using a penstock pipe which is 125 meter long and 1.5 meter in diameter. The Project started in 2009 and was completed in 2011. The Power plant capacity is 4.8 Megawatts and annual production is 10.97 million units.

== Specifications ==
Dam/Weir: Poozhithodu
| Location | Latitude:11⁰39’4.5”N Longitude:75⁰51’47.5”E | Dam Features | |
| | Type of Dam | Concrete gravity | |
| Panchayath | Kavilumpara | Classification | Weir |
| Village | Maruthomkara | Maximum Water Level (MWL) | EL 272.6 m |
| District | Kozhikode | Full Reservoir Level ( FRL) | EL 271.35 m |
| River Basin | Kuttiady | Storage at FRL | Diversion only |
| River | Illianipuzha & Kadanthrapuzha | Height from deepest foundation | 6.0 m |
| Release from Dam to river | Kadanthra puzha | Length | 56.95 m |
| Taluk through which release flows | Koyilandy | Spillway | No spillway |
| Year of completion | 2011 | Crest Level | EL 271.35 m |
| Name of Project | Poozhithode Small Hydro Electric Project | River Outlet | |
| Purpose of Project | Hydro Power | Officers in charge & phone No. | Executive Engineer, KG Division, Kakkayam, PIN-673615 Phone.9446008466 |
| Installed capacity of the Project | 3×1.6(4.8MW) | Assistant Executive Engineer, SHEP, Kakkayam, PIN- 673615 Phone.9446045170 | |
| Project Identification Code ( PIC) | Nil | | |
