= Thikkodi =

- Village
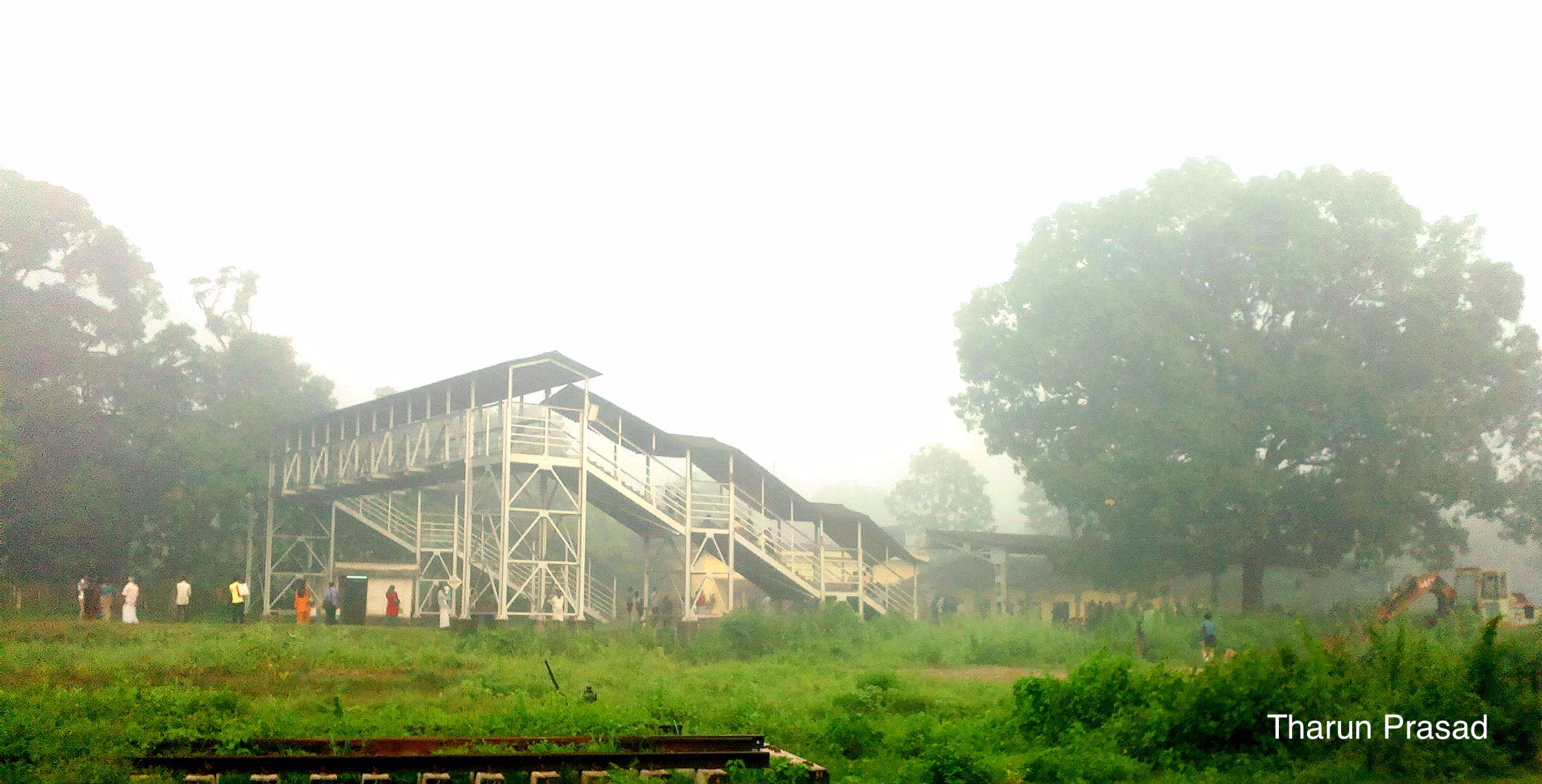
- Thikkodi village

- Location in Kerala, India Thikkodi (India)
- Coordinates: 11°29′42.601″N 75°37′25.923″E
- Country: India
- State: Kerala
- District: Kozhikode

Population (2011)
  - Total: 27,051

Languages
  - Official: Malayalam, English
- Time zone: UTC+5:30 (IST)
- PIN: 673529
- Vehicle registration: KL56
- Nearest city: Koyilandy
- Website: www.thikkodigramapanchayat.com

Thikkodi is a small village near Koyilandy in Kozhikode district of Kerala state, south India. Thikkodi is famous for a coconut nursery, which is more than 100 years old. The nearest city is Kozhikode, which is 35 km from this village.

One can see remains of an old lighthouse at Velliyamkallu in Thikkodi village. The village is also renowned for its mussels (kallumakaaya).

Thikkodi is the birthplace of well known Malayalam author, P. Kunhananandan Nair, better known by his pen name Thikodiyan. He was a multi-faceted personality.

Description of the area and people of Thikkodi and surrounding geographical areas can be seen in the works of the Award Winning story teller U. A. Khader. His work Thrikotooor Peruma has portrayed the history and geography of the area very well.

Kadalur Point Lighthouse

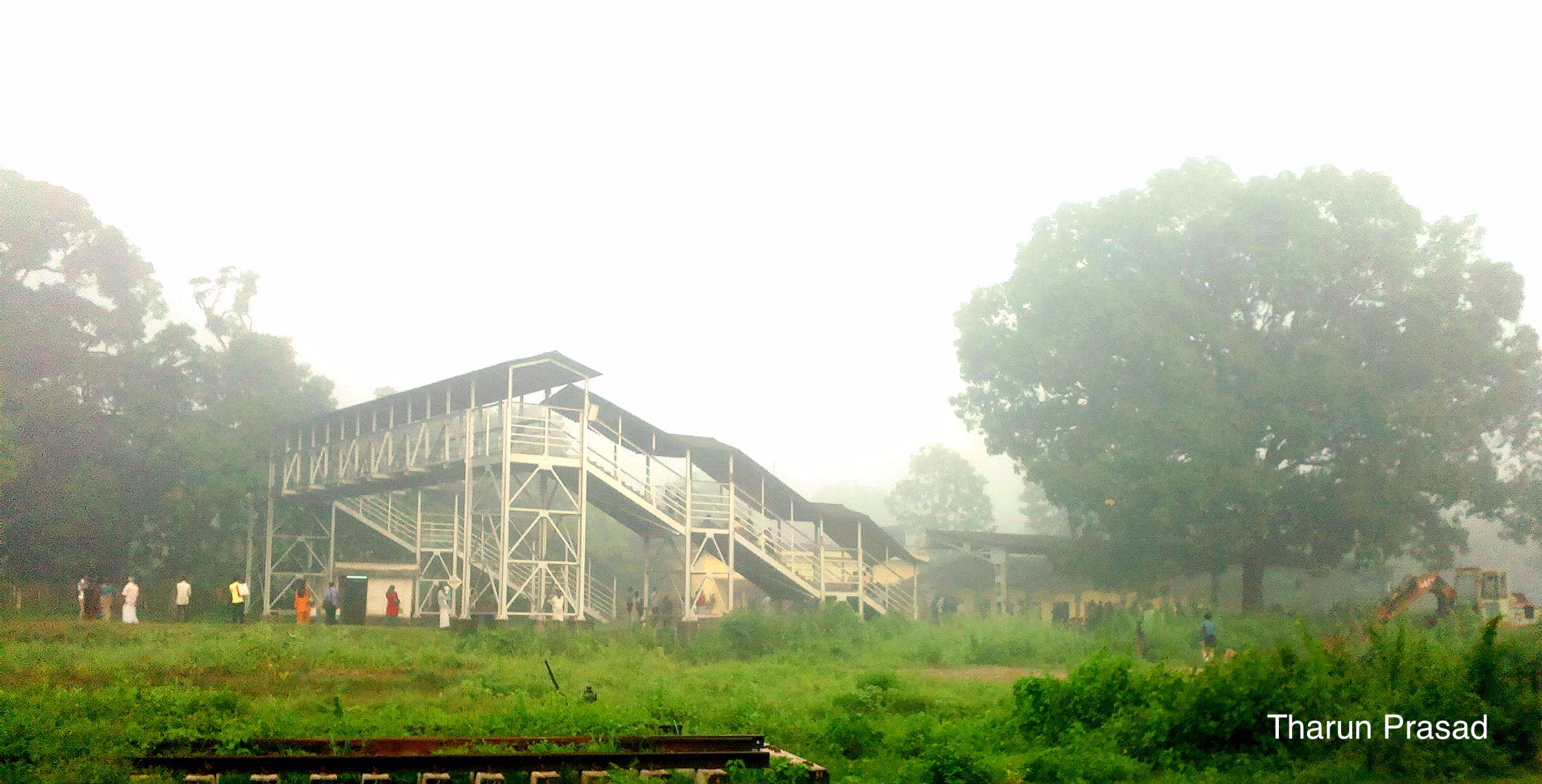
File:Thikkodi_Railway_Station_14-8-12.jpg

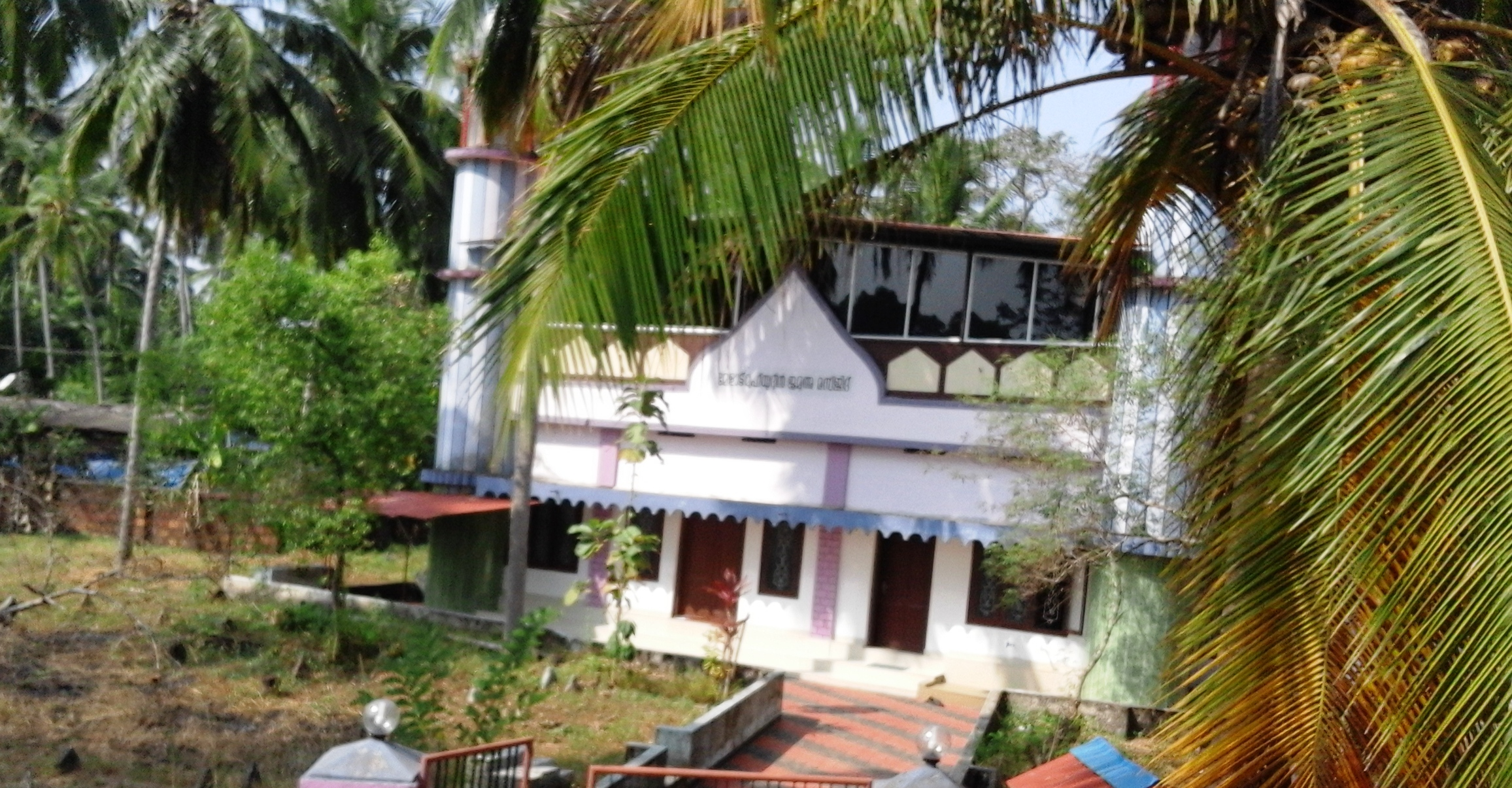
File:Thikkodi._A.jpgThikkodi Masjidh

== Demographics ==
As of 2011 India census, Thikkody had a population of 27051 with 12334 males and 14717 females.

== Religious places ==
There are big temples like Palur Mahavishnu, Thrikkottoor Maha Ganapathi, Perumalpuram Shiva and Thrikkottoor Shree Krishna. Muslims worship in places like Thikkodi Meethale Palli, Thikkodi Kodikkal Juamath Palli.

== Institutions ==
- GVHSS PAYYOLI
- Thrikkottur A.U.P School
- Paloor LP School
- Thrikkottur West Government LP School
- Mappila L.P. School, Thikkodi Panchayath Bazar

== Transportation ==
Thikkodi village connects to other parts of India through Koyilandy town. The nearest airports are at Calicut and Kannur. The nearest main railway station is at Koyilandy . A small railway station at Thikkodi also serves a few slow trains. The national highway no.66 passes through Koyilandy and the northern stretch connects to Mangalore, Goa and Mumbai. The southern stretch connects to Cochin and Trivandrum. The eastern National Highway No.54 going through Kuttiady connects to Mananthavady, Mysore and Bangalore.

== See also ==
- Nadapuram
- Thottilpalam
- Perambra
- Madappally
- Villiappally
- Memunda
- Iringal
- Mahe, Pondicherry
- Payyoli
- Orkkatteri
