= Villiappally =

- village
- Location in Kerala, India Villiappally (India)
- Coordinates: 11°37′32″N 75°37′46″E
- Country: India
- State: Kerala
- District: kozhikode district

Government
  - Type: Panchayati raj (India)
  - Body: Gram panchayat

Population (2001)
  - Total: 31,763

Languages
  - Official: Malayalam, English
- Time zone: UTC+5:30 (IST)
- PIN: 673542
- Telephone code: 496253
- Vehicle registration: KL 18

Villiappally is a census town in Kozhikode district in the Indian state of Kerala. Villiappally is the headquarters of Villiappally Panchayath, which contains two villages, Memunda and Villiappally. There is a Vocational Higher Secondary School in this village.The name "villiyapalli" came from "valiya palli(Big mosque)"in Malayalam language turns to name of the city which was built by late Jawa Ahmmed Haji.

== Transportation ==
Villiappally village connects to other parts of India through Vatakara city on the west and Kuttiady town on the east. National highway No.66 passes through Vatakara and the northern stretch connects to Mangalore, Goa and Mumbai. The southern stretch connects to Cochin and Trivandrum. The eastern Highway going through Kuttiady connects to Mananthavady, Mysore and Bangalore. The nearest airports are at Kannur and Kozhikode. The nearest railway station is at Vatakara.

== Demographics ==
As of 2001 Indian census, Villiappally had a population of 31,763. Males constitute 48% of the population and females 52%. Villiappally has an average literacy rate of 81%, higher than the national average of 59.5%: male literacy is 85%, and female literacy is 78%. In Villiappally, 11% of the population is under 6 years of age.

== Educational institutions ==
- Muslim Jama’ath(EMJAY) Vocational Higher Secondary School
- Govt. Higher Secondary School (GHSS) Chorod
- Memunda Higher secondary school
- MES college

== See also ==
- Nadapuram
- Thottilpalam
- Perambra
- Madappally
- Memunda
- Iringal
- Mahe, Pondicherry
- Payyoli
- Thikkodi
- Orkkatteri
