= Kedavur =

- village
- Location in Kerala, India Kedavur (India)
- Coordinates: 11°25′0″N 75°56′0″E
- Country: India
- State: Kerala
- District: Kozhikode

Population (2011)
  - Total: 27,273

Languages
  - Official: Malayalam, English
- Time zone: UTC+5:30 (IST)
- Vehicle registration: KL-

Kedavur is a village in Kozhikode district in the state of Kerala, India.

== Demographics ==
As of 2011 India census, Kedavur had a population of 27273 with 12972 males and 14301 females.

== Transportation ==
Kedavur village connects to other parts of India through Vatakara town on the west and Kuttiady town on the east. National highway No.66 passes through Vatakara and the northern stretch connects to Mangalore, Goa and Mumbai. The southern stretch connects to Cochin and Trivandrum. The eastern National Highway No.54 going through Kuttiady connects to Mananthavady, Mysore and Bangalore. The nearest airports are at Kannur and Kozhikode. The nearest railway station is at Vatakara.
