= Chathangottunada =

- village
- Location in Kerala, India Chathangottunada (India)
- Coordinates: 11.6919°N 75.7997°E
- Country: India
- State: Kerala
- District: Kozhikode

Languages
  - Official: Malayalam, English
- Time zone: UTC+5:30 (IST)
- PIN: 673513
- Telephone code: 0496
- Vehicle registration: 77
- Coastline: 0 kilometres (0 mi)
- Nearest city: Kozhikode
- Climate: Tropical monsoon (Köppen)
- Avg. summer temperature: 36 °C (97 °F)
- Avg. winter temperature: 30 °C (86 °F)

Chathangottunada is a small village in Calicut district. It is located in Kavilumpara panchayath. Wayanad Road (which connects Kuttiyadi and Mananthavady) goes through the town. A. J. John Memorial High School, one of the oldest education schools, is located here. Nearby towns include Thottilpalam and Kuttiyadi. The village's residents include Hindus, Christians and Muslims. The principal political parties are CPI(M), Indian National Congress, Kerala Congress (M) and IUML.

== Surrounding towns ==
Some of the villages surrounding the town include Nagampara, Cheethapattu, Chappenthottam, Koodalil, Poothampara, and Pattyadu.

== Education ==
A. J. John Memorial High School (A. J. J. M. H. S.) is a high school located here. It is named after A. J. John, Anaparambil. It is managed by the Missionary Congregation of the Blessed Sacrament (or MCBS Sabha).

== Transportation ==
Chathangottunada village connects to other parts of India through Vatakara town on the west and Kuttiady town on the east. National highway No.66 passes through Vatakara and the northern stretch connects to Mangalore, Goa and Mumbai. The southern stretch connects to Cochin and Trivandrum. The eastern National Highway No.54 going through Kuttiady connects to Mananthavady, Mysore and Bangalore. The nearest airports are at Kannur and Kozhikode. The nearest railway station is at Vatakara.
