= Pavayil =

Pavayil Pavayil Cheerpu
- place
- Pavayil

- Location in Kerala, India Pavayil (India)
- Coordinates: 11°21′30″N 75°46′18″E
- Country: India
- State: Kerala
- District: Kozhikode

Languages
  - Official: Malayalam, English
- Time zone: UTC+5:30 (IST)
- PIN: 673317
- Telephone code: 91495285
- Vehicle registration: KL-11
- Nearest city: Kozhikode

Pavayil is a small village in Kozhikode district of Kerala state, South India. It is located near the Akalapuzha River - ecotourism has begun to grow in the area. A festival of the same name takes place in April. The Kerala Lalitakala Academy organizes artistic day-camps and activities during the Pavayil Festival, such as a painting camps.
