= Kadiyangad =

Village in Kozhikode district, Kerala

Coordinates: 11°36′N 75°46′E

Kadiyangad is a village near Perambra in Kozhikode district, Kerala.

== Location ==
Kadiyangad is a small Village/hamlet in Koyilandy Taluk in Kozhikode District of Kerala, India. It comes under Changaroth Panchayath. It belongs to North Kerala Division. It is located 42 km towards North from District headquarters Kozhikode. 5 km from Perambra. 432 km from State capital Thiruvananthapuram. Kadiyangad's Pin code is 673525, and the head office is Perambra.

== Transportation ==
Kadiyangad village connects to other parts of India through Perambra town on the south and Kuttiady town on the north. National highway No.66 passes through Vatakara and the northern stretch connects to Mangalore, Goa and Mumbai. The southern stretch connects to Cochin and Trivandrum. The eastern Highway going through Kuttiady connects to Mananthavady, Mysore and Bangalore. The nearest airports are at Kannur and Kozhikode. The nearest railway station is at Vatakara.
