= Keezhariyur =

- Village
- Location in Kerala, India Keezhariyur (India)
- Coordinates: 11°29′0″N 75°41′0″E
- Country: India
- State: Kerala
- District: Kozhikode

Government
  - Type: Grama Panchayat
  - Body: Gram panchayat

Area
  - Land: 13.69 km^{2} (5.29 sq mi)

Population (2011)
  - Total: 15,116
  - Density: 1,104/km^{2} (2,860/sq mi)

Languages
  - Official: Malayalam, English
- Time zone: UTC+5:30 (IST)
- Postal code: 673307
- Vehicle registration: KL 56

Keezhariyur is a village near Koyilandy in Kozhikode district, that lies on the eastern shore of Akalapuzha Lake. This village is famous for the bomb case happened during Independence struggle. Malayalam is the Local Language here. Keezhariyur has its own post office and the Pincode is 673307. Keezhriyur Panchayat was formed on 27 September 1968.

== Demographics ==
As of 2011 India census, Keezhariyur had a population of 15116 with 7061 males and 8055 females.

== Transportation ==
Keezhariyur connects to other parts of India through Koyilandy town. The nearest airports are at Kannur and Kozhikode. The nearest railway station is at Koyiandy. The national highway no.66 passes through Koyilandy and the northern stretch connects to Mangalore, Goa and Mumbai. The southern stretch connects to Cochin and Trivandrum. The eastern National Highway No.54 going through Kuttiady connects to Mananthavady, Mysore and Bangalore.

Keezhariyur is in the Melday Block and belongs to North Kerala Division. It is located 33 km North of Kozhikode District headquarters and 424 km from State capital Thiruvananthapuram. Moodadi (4 km), Meppayur (5 km), Maniyur (6 km), Panthalayani (7 km), Cheruvannur (7 km) are the nearby villages to Keezhariyur. Keezhariyur is surrounded by Panthalayani Block towards South, Thodannur Block towards North, Perambra Block towards East, Balusseri Block towards East.

Vellarakkad Rail Way Station, Koyilandy Rail Way Station are the very nearby railway stations to Keezhariyur.

== Local Self Government ==
There are 13 wards in this Village

1. Vadakkummuri
2. Keezhariyur west
3. Keezhariyur centre
4. Naduvathoor
5. Manappattil thazhe
6. Kunnoth mukku
7. Nambrathukara
8. Nambrathukara west
9. Naduvathoor south
10. Thathamvallipoyil
11. Mannadi
12. Keeramkunnu
13. Korapra

== Keezhariyur Bomb Case ==
The Keezhriyur bomb case is a famous bomb case that took place in Kerala in connection with the Quit India movement in 1942. The agitators set fire to Chemanchery Sub-Registrar's Office, Thiruvanur Railway Station, Kothallur Kunanthara Amshakacheri, destroyed the Ullieri Bridge and cut the telegraph line. The Keezhriyur bomb case was the most tragic incident that followed. Secretary of the All India Civil Liberties Union Dr. K. B. Due to the police allegation that Menon, with the help of his colleagues, had conspired with a group at Keezhriyur in the Malabar region, those involved in the case were convicted and had to spend a long time in jail.

The blasts took place on November 17, 1942. The bomb was made at a house in Koonthankalulla at Keezhriyur near Koiyalandi in Kozhikode district. An experiment was also conducted on Mavat mountain which was a jungle. Socialist Dr. who returned from America following Gandhiji's call. KB Menon and his friends held a secret meeting at the house of Varkot Raghavan Nair in Chalappuram, Kozhikode and declared November 9 as Vidhvamsaka Day. The plan was to shock the British by detonating bombs at various places without causing casualties. Keezhriyoor village was chosen as a suitable place for bomb making. As the bomb construction was not completed on the 9th of November, the explosion was postponed to the 17th. Although the bomb blast plan failed everywhere, Patiyam Village Office, Kirthalli Village Office, Kozhikode Madras Governor's Pandal, Kallai Railway Station, Kallai Timber Centre, Malaparam Golf Club, Thalassery Pathipalam, Palakkad Victoria College Lab, Mukkali Fish Drying Centre, Pallikunn Post Office, Kannur Girls There were simultaneous bomb blasts in high schools.

After the incident, the British police conducted a raid in Keezhriyur. Even the family members of the protestors were not spared by the police. K. B. Menon and Mathai Manjooran, C.P. Sankaran Nair,N.A.Krishnan Nair, V.A. Kesavan Nair, D. Jayadeva Rao, O. Raghavan Nair, Karial Achuthan, E. Vasudevan, N.P. Abu, K. Narayanan Nair, Kelukutty in Kuruma, T. Patcher, Kurumayl Narayanan, K. Kunhiraman, K.V. Chamu, V. Prabhakaran, K. Muhammad Naha, P. Mammootty, P. Abdullahkoya Thangal, S.N. Valill, V.K. Achuthan Vaidyar, K. Gopalan, C. Damodaran, K.T. Alavi, C. The accused were Chounni. 12 people were sentenced to seven years imprisonment and one to 10 years rigorous imprisonment. (Clarification needed).

Netaji Subash Chandra Bose K.B. investigated the Keezhriyur bomb case which was noted all over India. Menon's letter is famous. V.A. Kesavan Nair's book 'Irumbazhiyin' is an authoritative book on the Keezhriyur bomb case.

== Schools ==
- Higher Secondary
  - Sree Vasudeva Ashrama Hs Naduvathur
- Upper Primary
  - Kannoth Upper Primary School Keezhariyur
  - Naduvathur Upper Primary School
  - Nambrathukara Upper Primary School
- Lower Primary
  - Keezhariyur West Mappila Lower Primary School
  - Naduvathur South Lower Primary School

== Hospital ==
Keezhariyur PHC

== Banks/ATMs ==
Kerala Gramin Bank

Keezhariyur Co-operative Bank

== Government Services ==
Krishi Bhavan, Post office, Village office, Akshaya

== Politics in Keezhariyur ==
Indian National Congress, Communist Party of India (Marxist), KEC(M) are the major political parties in this area.
