= Iringal =

- village
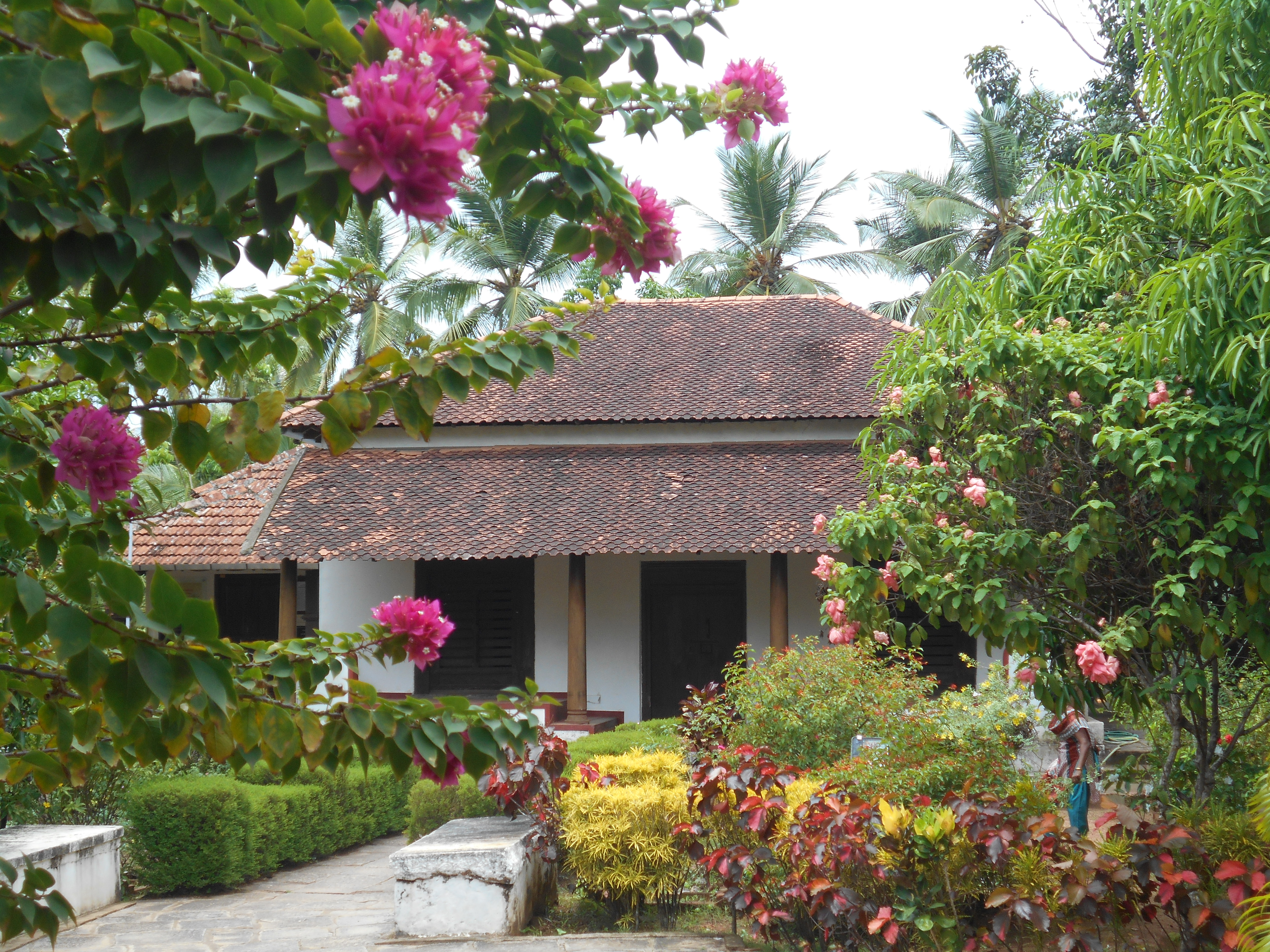
- Kunjali Marakkar Memorial
- Interactive map of Iringal
- Coordinates: 11°34′0″N 75°36′0″E
- Country: India
- State: Kerala
- District: Kozhikode

Population (2011)
  - Total: 25,894

Languages
  - Official: Malayalam, English
- Time zone: UTC+5:30 (IST)
- PIN: 673521
- Vehicle registration: KL-56
- Nearest city: Vatakara

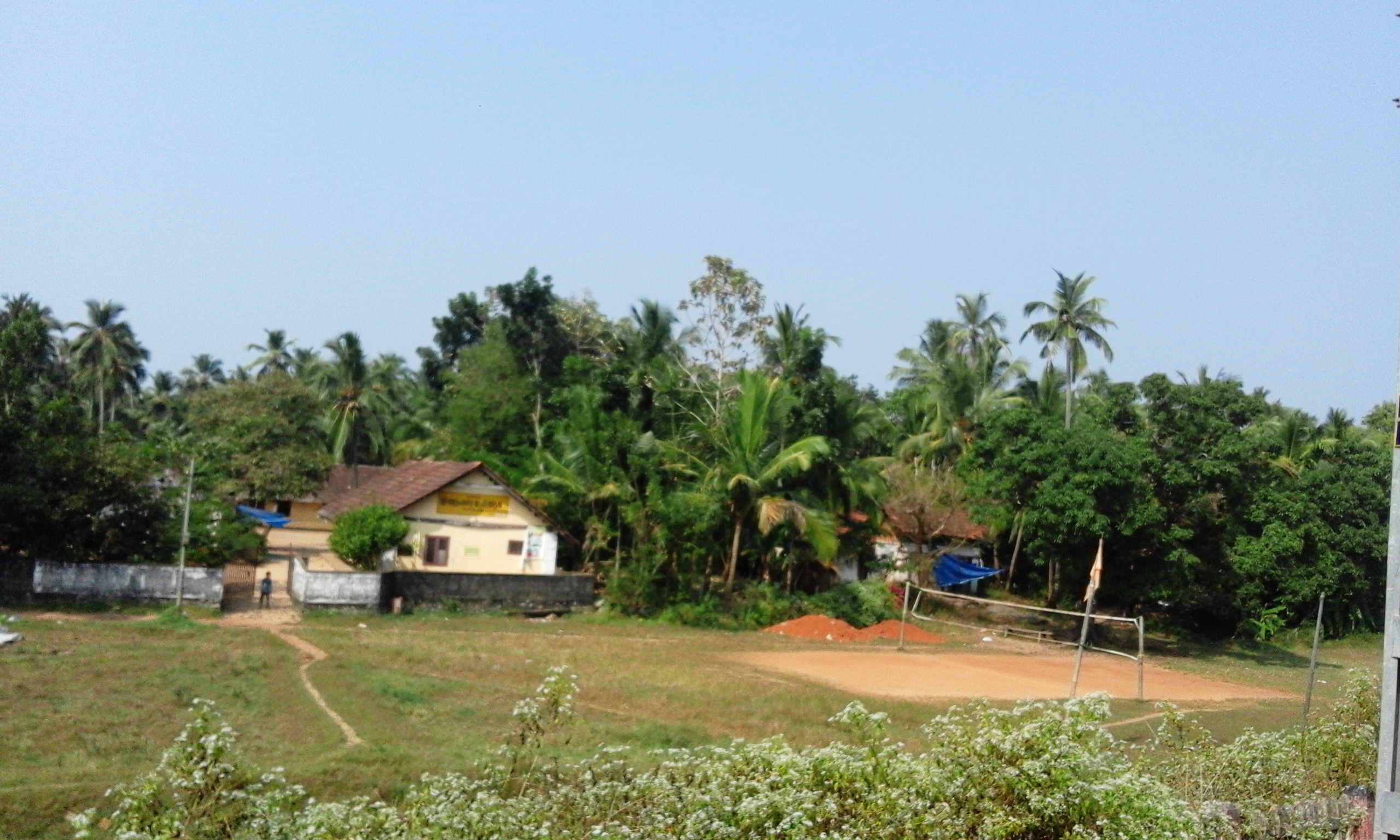
Subramanya School

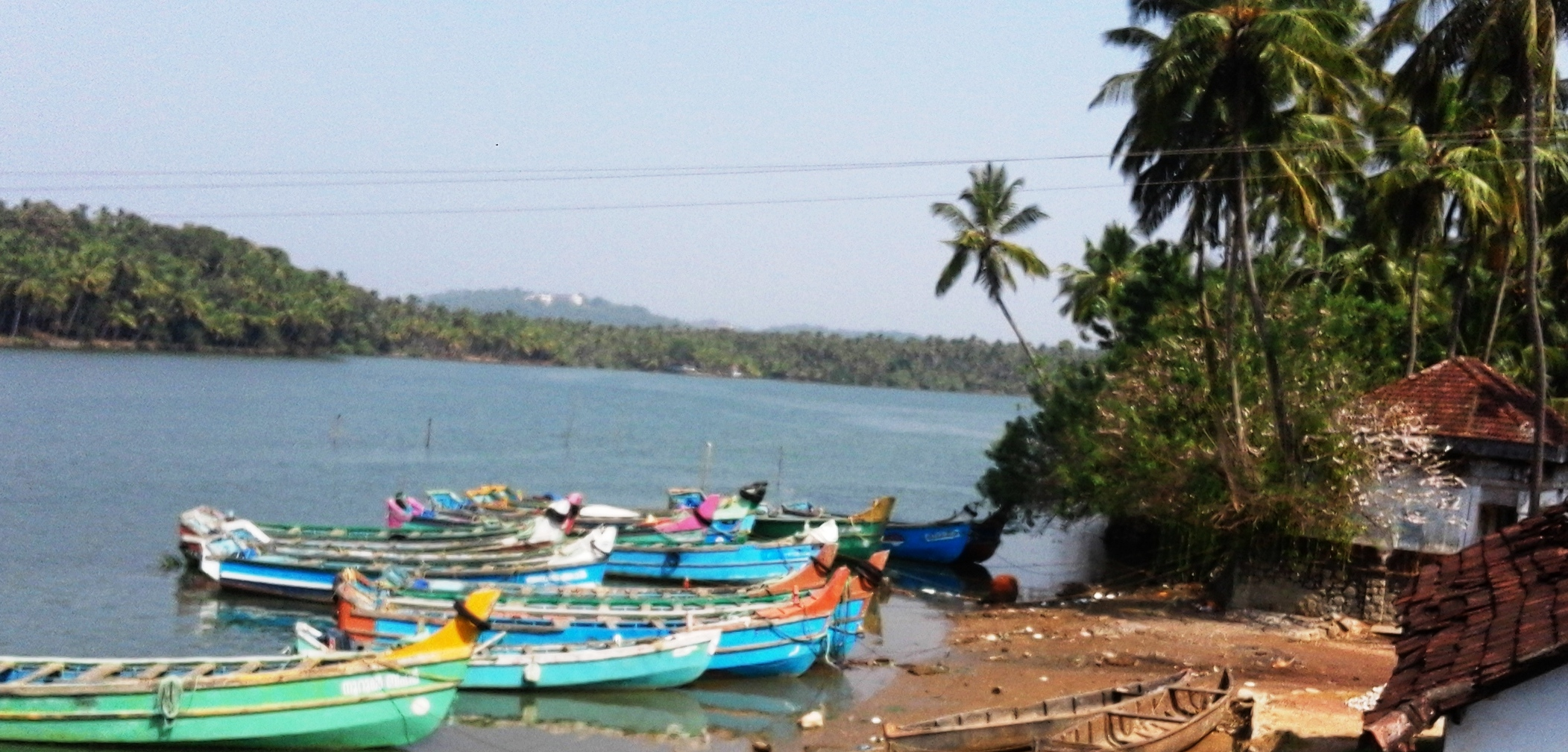
Moorad Jetty

Iringal is a village in Kozhikode district in the state of Kerala, India.

== History ==
Kunjali Marakkar was born in Iringal, rose to the rank of an admiral, lead the Zamorin's navy and thwarted Portuguese ships' attempts to land on the Kerala coast. This admiral's birthplace is located on the Mooradi River's southern bank. His birthplace is preserved by the Department of Archaeology.

== Demographics ==
As of 2011 India census, Iringal had a population of 25894 with 12139 males and 13755 females.

== Sargalaya Craft Village ==
Iringal Craft Village managed by tourism department of Kerala, inaugurated on Sunday Nov,14,2010 is one of the major tourist attractions in Iringal. This facility was built by the government of Kerala for allowing local artisans to showcase their products. They also sell their products at fair prices. Visiting foreigners can learn some skills of craft making from the horses' mouth. This facility is built in a 20-acre plot at Iringal on the shores of kutiady river. There are 60 stalls for sale and exhibition of handicrafts. The villages displays products made of fibre, bamboo, coir, sand, coconut, palm and pine.

== Transportation ==
Iringal village connects to other parts of India through Vatakara town on the west and Kuttiady town on the east. National highway No.66 passes through Iringal and the northern stretch connects to Mangalore, Goa and Mumbai. The southern stretch connects to Cochin and Trivandrum. The eastern Highway going through Kuttiady connects to Mananthavady, Mysore and Bangalore. The nearest airports are at Kannur and Kozhikode. The nearest railway stations are Iringal, Payyoli and vatakara railway stations

== See also ==
- Thottilpalam
- Madappally
- Villiappally
- Memunda
- Payyoli
- Orkkatteri
- Iringal railway station
