= S. K. Sajeesh =

Indian politician

S.K.Sajeesh
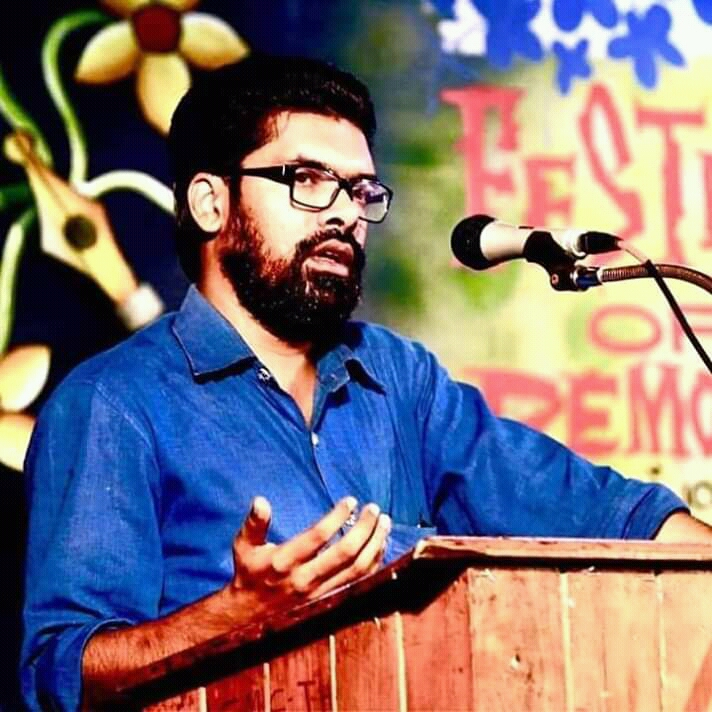

Personal details
- Born: 15 March 1982 (age 44) Perambra, Kozhikode, Kerala
- Party: Communist Party of India (Marxist) CPI(M)
- Spouse: Jyolsna George
- Children: Alejo sajo, Anjelo sajo

S.K.Sajeesh (Malayalam: സ് . കെ സജീഷ് ) (born 15 March 1982) is an Indian politician from the state of Kerala. He is a member of the Communist Party of India (Marxist) political party. He is currently working as Treasurer, Kerala State Committee of the Democratic Youth Federation of India (DYFI)

== Early life ==
Sk Sajeesh was born in Perambra, Kozhikode. He did his schooling at Perambra high school and subsequently completed his pre-degree from CKG Memorial Government College, Perambra. He completed B.com from R. Shankar Memorial Arts and Science College (RSM SNDP Yogam College, Koyilandy), He studied LL.B from Government Law College, Kozhikode.

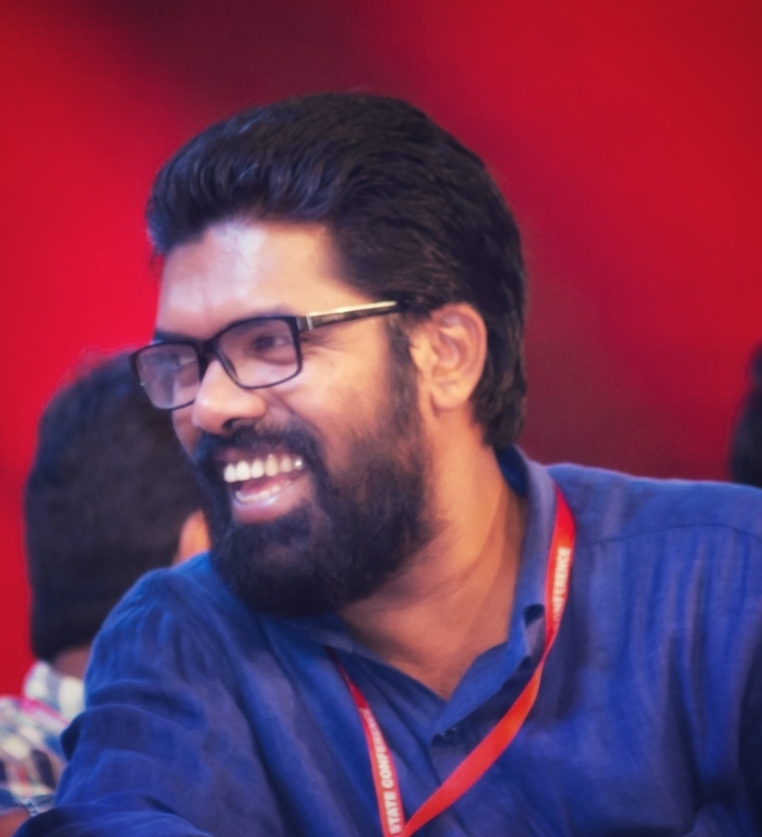
SK SAJEESH DYFI

== Political career ==
S.K.Sajeesh entered into politics as a Students' Federation of India (SFI) activist during his school days. He was part of the leadership of SFI from school to the state level. He was the former chairman of the Calicut University Union. In 2009 SK Sajeesh was elected as State Vice President of SFI Kerala Chapter. He wrote the lyrics of the famous theme song of the 20th CPIM Party Congress at Kozhikode. Later he moved onto DYFI. he was the District President of DYFI Kozhikode 2016–2018.He was the Treasurer of Dyfi kerala state Committee 2018-2022. He has led various furious struggles against different corrupted UDF governments being in the leadership of SFI and DYFI.

== Positions held ==
- SFI Perambra Unit Secretary
- SFI Perambra Area Secretary
- SFI Koyilandi Area Secretary
- SFI Onchiyum Area Secretary
- SN College Union Chairman
- SFI Kozhikode District Secretary 2005-10
- SFI wayanad District In charge
- Kozhikode Law College Union UUC
- Calicut University Union councilor
- Calicut University Union Chairman 2008
- Calicut University Syndicate Member
- SFI State Vice President 2009
- CPIM Perambra Area Committee Member
- DYFI State Committee Member
- DYFI State Secretariat Member
- DYFI Kozhikode District President 2016-2018
- Kerala Tourism Promotion Council Executive member 2017
- DYFI STATE CENTER MEMBER 2018
- TREASURER, DYFI KERALA STATE COMMITTEE 2018
- Central Committee member 2019, DYFI India
