= Payyoli railway station =

Railway station in Kerala, India

Payyoli
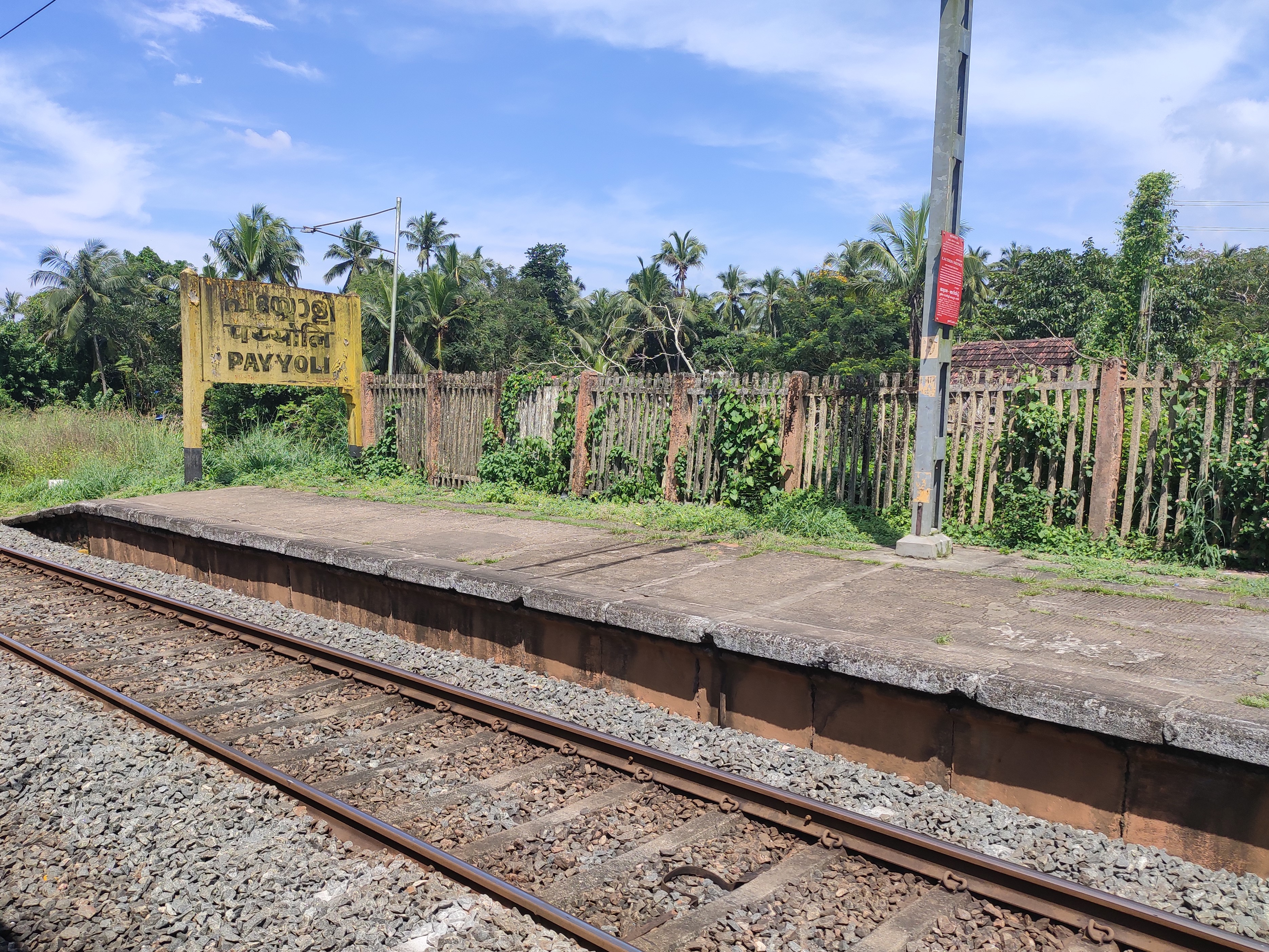
- Payyoli

General information
- Location: Payyoli, Kozhikode, Kerala; India
- Coordinates: 11.51728°N 75.61824°E
- System: Regional rail, Light rail & Commuter rail station
- Owner: Indian Railways
- Operator: Southern Railway zone
- Line: Shoranur–Mangalore line
- Platforms: 2
- Tracks: 2

Construction
- Structure type: At–grade
- Parking: Available

Other information
- Status: Functioning
- Station code: PYOL
- Zone(s): Southern Railway zone
- Division(s): Palakkad
- Fare zone: Indian Railways

History
- Opened: 1904; 122 years ago
Location
- Location within India Location within Kerala

Payyoli railway station (station code: PYOL) is an NSG–6 category Indian railway station in Palakkad railway division of Southern Railway zone. It is a major railway station serving the town of Payyoli in the Kozhikode District of Kerala, India. It lies in the Shoranur–Mangalore section of the Southern Railways. It is a railway station in Kozhikode district, Kerala.
