= Orkkatteri =

Orkkattery
- Town
- Location in Kerala, India Orkkattery (India)
- Coordinates: 11.717595°N 75.596466°E
- Country: India
- State: Kerala
- Region: North Malabar
- District: Kozhikode

Area
  - Total: 17 km^{2} (6.6 sq mi)

Languages
  - Official: Malayalam, English
- Time zone: UTC+5:30 (IST)
- Telephone code: 0496
- Vehicle registration: KL 18
- Nearest city: Vatakara
- Lok Sabha constituency: Vatakara

Orkkattery is a small town in Kozhikode district in the North Malabar region of state of Kerala, India. This is the center town for Eramala grama panchayath.

== History ==
A mother and son from a family known as Edathil Tharavadu used to live in this area. One day, while the mother — a devoted follower of Lord Shiva — was farming koova, her hoe struck a stone, and blood began to flow from it. During the ensuing Deva Prasnam (divine inquiry), it was revealed that the stone was in fact a Shiva Lingam. As a result, the Tharavadu was granted authority over this area to build a temple. The place came to be known as Orkkatteri, which means “the land unexpectedly received.”

== Economy ==
Agriculture makes up a large part of the economy, although paddy cultivation has had a major setback, as is the case with most of Kerala, with paddy fields being claimed for houses and more profitable crops. Migration to the Middle East (Gulf) and to other major cities in India is prevalent. There is a saliya-theruvu (weaver's street) where weaving is an important occupation.

== Cattle market ==
Orkkatteri Kannukali Chanda (cattle market) is a festival in Malabar. It is also known as Orkkatteri Thalappoli. It is part of the Festival of the Two Temples. It starts from 12 of Makaram (January) and lasts for 4-10 days. People belonging to all castes and communities participate in the festival.

== Transportation ==
Orkkatteri connects to other parts of India through Vatakara on the west and Kuttiady on the east. National Highway 66 passes through Vatakara and the northern stretch connects to Mangalore, Goa and Mumbai. The southern stretch connects to Cochin and Trivandrum. The eastern highway going through Kuttiady connects to Mananthavady, Mysore and Bangalore. The nearest airports are at Kannur and Kozhikode. The nearest railway station is at Vatakara.

== See also ==
- Vatakara
- Nadapuram
- Thottilpalam
- Perambra
- Madappally
- Villiappally
- Memunda
- Iringal
- Mahe, Pondicherry
- Payyoli
- Thikkodi
