= Lokanarkavu Temple =

Hindu temple in Kerala, India

- ലോകനാർകാവ്‌ ക്ഷേത്രം
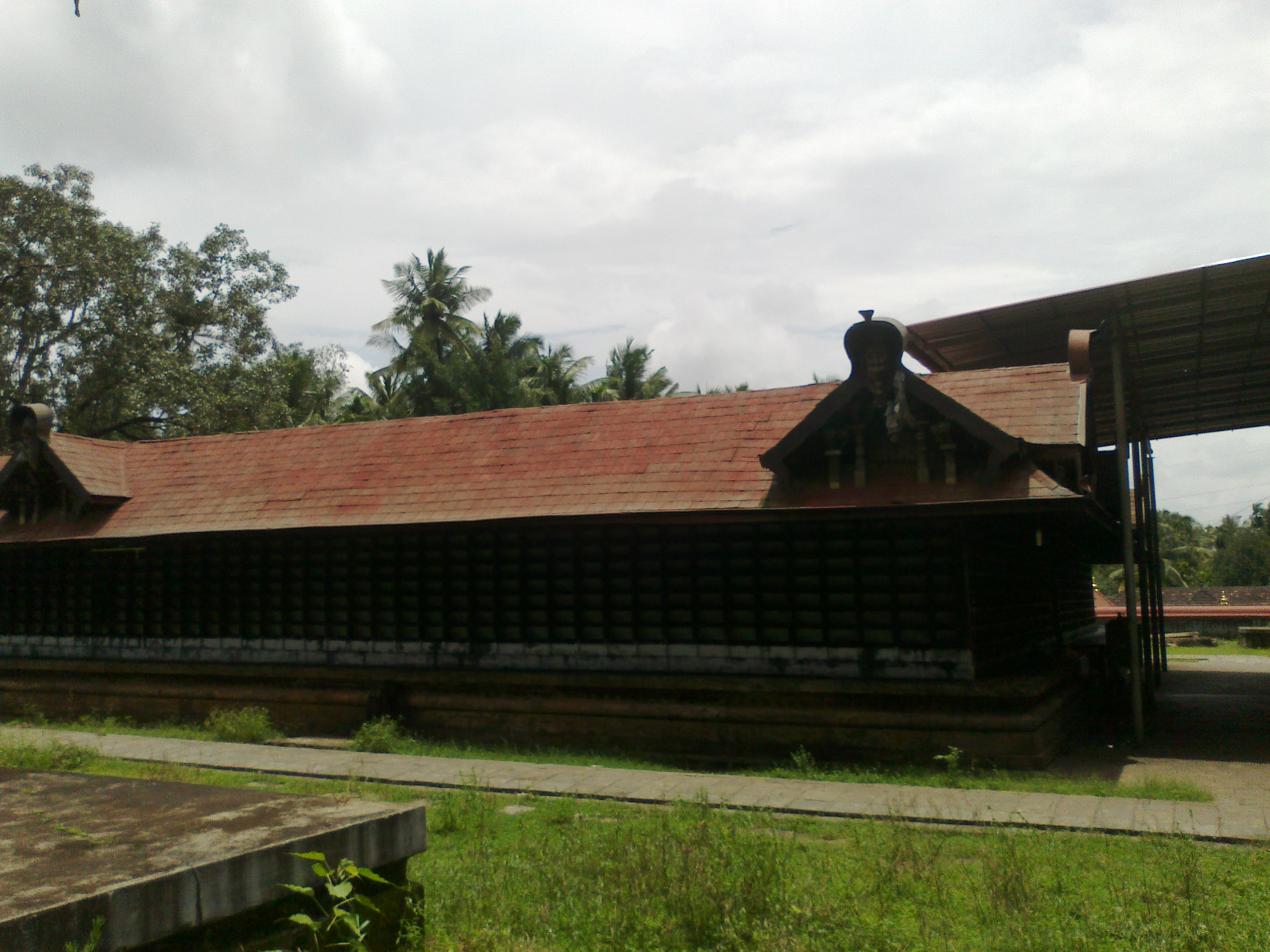

- Lokanarkavu Temple, Memunda, Kozhikode, (Kerala) Lokanarkavu Temple (India)

Religion
- Affiliation: Hinduism
- District: Kozhikode
- Deity: Durga
- Festivals: Vrischikam Utsavam, Meenam Utsavam, Navaratri
- Governing body: Malabar Devaswom Board

Location
- Location: Memunda, Vatakara
- State: Kerala
- Country: India
- Coordinates: 11.598081°N 75.619655°E

Architecture
- Type: Traditional Kerala style
- Completed: Records indicate the temple to be 1500 years old

Specifications
- Temple: One
- Elevation: 43.21 m (142 ft)

Website
- https://lokanarkavutemple.org/

Lokanarkavu Temple is an ancient Hindu temple dedicated to goddess Durga devi situated in Memunda, 4 km from Vatakara, in Kozhikode District of Kerala state of south India. Lokanarkavu is a short form of Lokamalayarkavu which means lokam (world) made of mala (mountain), aaru (river) and kavu (grove). The closest railway station is at Vatakara, which is 5 km from temple. The nearest airport is Kannur airport which is 54 km away.

Pooram is the important festival here and it is conducted with great pomp and show. The week-long festival begins with Kodiyettam (flag hoisting) and concludes with Arattu. The temple is dedicated to goddess Durga.

== Lokanarkavu and Kalarippayattu ==
Thirty days Mandala Utsavam in Malayalam month Vrischikam (November–December) and pooram in Malayalam month meenam (March–April) are the annual festival at the Lokanarkavu Bhagavathy Temple. This is the only temple where a peculiar folk dance called Poorakkali is presented during festivals. The dance, resembles the martial art Kalarippayattu. Even today, all Kalaripayattu artists seek the blessings of the deity before their debut due to the association of Lokanarkavu Temple with legendary hero thacholi othenan.

== Gallery ==
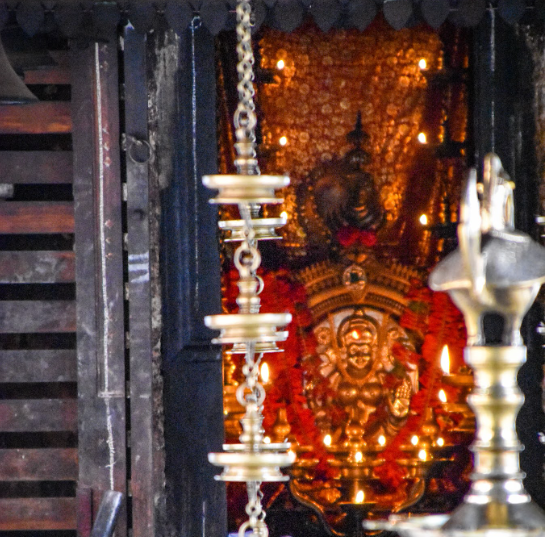
Lokanarkavu bhagavathy

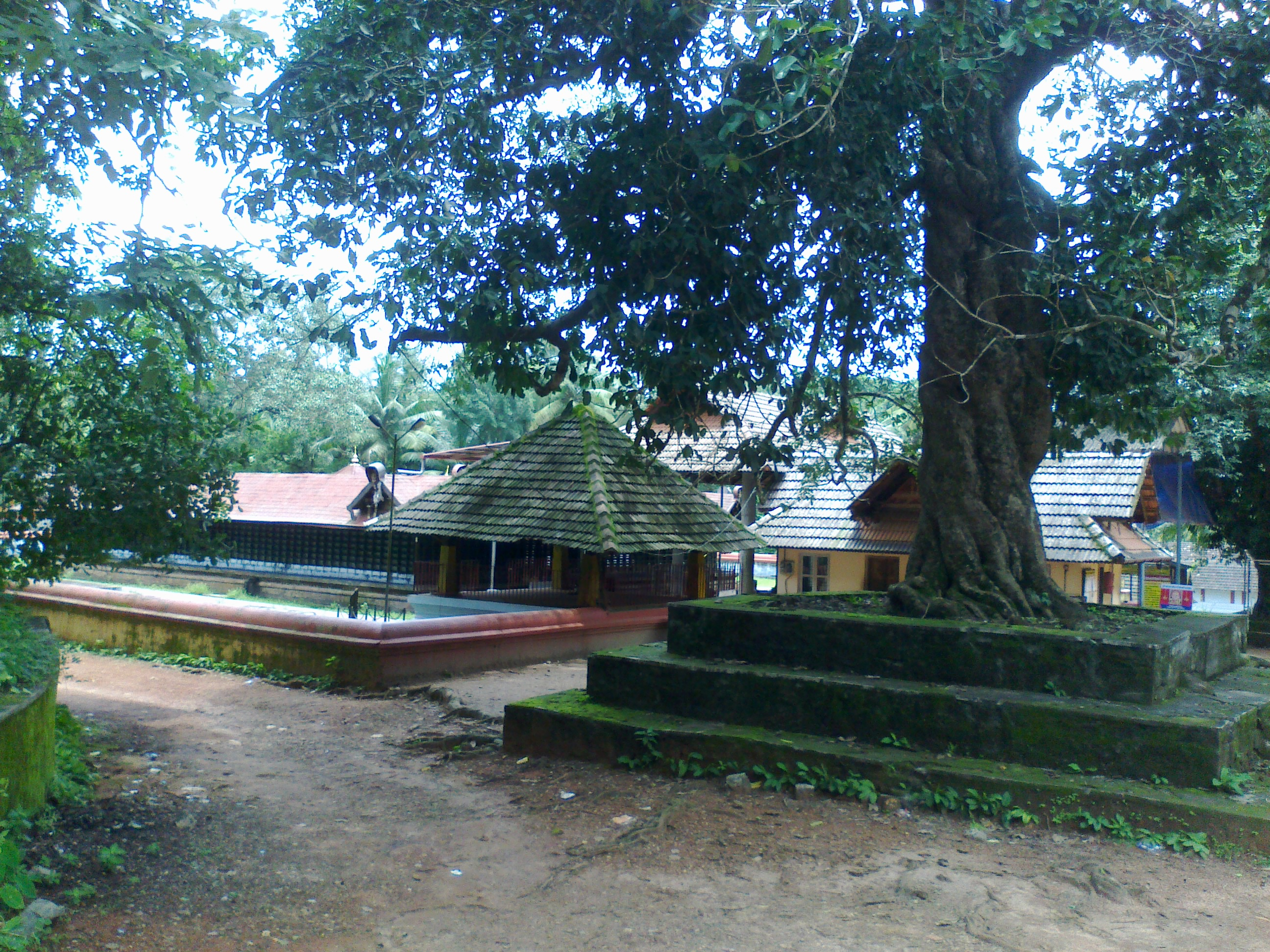
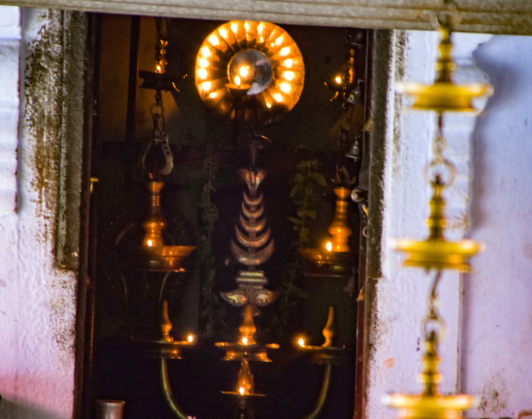
Lokanarkavu mahadev

== See also ==
- Kalarippayattu
- Thacholi Othenan
- Memunda
- Temples of Kerala
