= Payyoli =

- Municipality
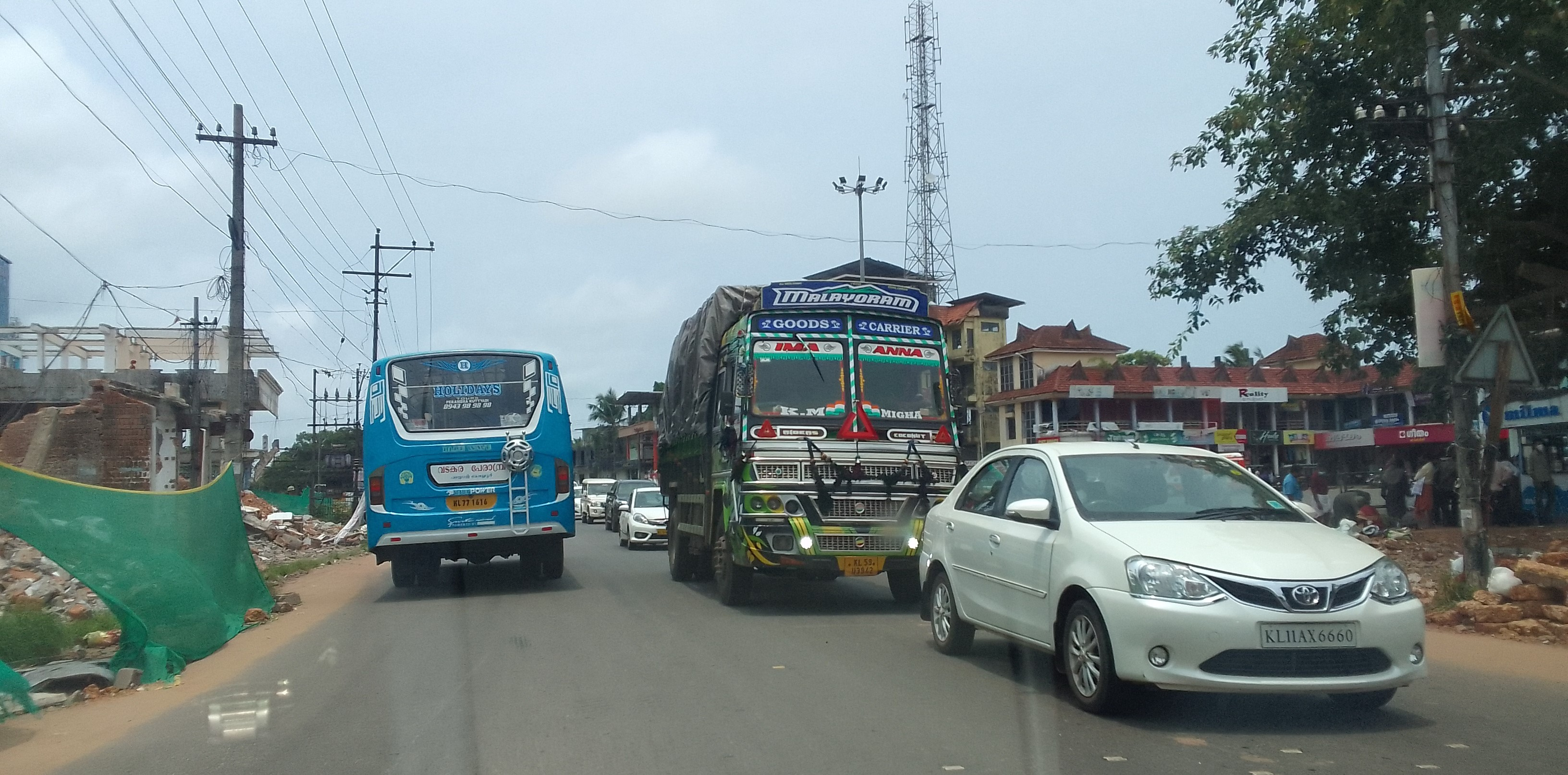
- Payyoli village

- Location in Kerala, India Payyoli (India)
- Coordinates: 11°32′0″N 75°40′0″E
- Country: India
- State: Kerala
- District: Kozhikode

Government
  - Type: Municipal Council

Area
  - Total: 22.34 km^{2} (8.63 sq mi)

Population (2011)
  - Total: 49,470
  - Density: 2,214/km^{2} (5,735/sq mi)

Languages
  - Official: Malayalam, English
- Time zone: UTC+5:30 (IST)
- PIN: 673522
- Telephone code: 0496
- ISO 3166 code: IN-KL
- Vehicle registration: KL-56
- Nearest city: Kozhikode
- Lok Sabha constituency: Vatakara

Payyoli is a municipality town on the Malabar Coast of Kozhikode district in the South Indian state of Kerala. Payyoli is famous for being the hometown of athlete PT Usha, who is nicknamed as the Payyoli Express. It is a town in Quilandy Taluk, Kozhikode District.

== Attractions ==
- Kunhali Marakkar museum, at Iringal, about 6.7 kilometres (4.2 mi) away from Payyoli
- Hochimin City Thurasserikkadav
- Thikkodi drive in beach
- Thuraserikkadavu (island/thuruth)
- Velliyam kallu (a rock in sea)
- Iringal craft village (iringal)
- Shikkara boat service purakkad (Akalapuzha river)
- Kadalur light house (nandhi)
- Kovvapuram chira (fishing spot)
- Perumal puram Siva temple
- Akalappuzha backwater view point
- Afrah Juma Masjid
- Kizhur Shiva kshethram
- Ayanikkad Juma Masjid
- Kottakkal Juma Masjid
- Kolavi palam beach & Turtle Cage
- Charichal Palli Makham (Payyoli Angadi)
- Payyoli Sreekurumba Bhagavati Temple
- Muthasshikkavu temple (Thurasserikkadavu)
- Micro wave view point – 8 km (5.0 mi) from payyoli (iringath)
- Mini Goa - Beach near Kolavipalam beach
- Parapalli beach

== Temples ==
- Kizhur Maha Shiva kshethram
- Sree Iringal Kottayil Temple
- Sreekurumba Bhagavati Temple
- Payyoli Sree Mahavishnu Temple
- Sree Kurumba Temple
- Muthassikkavu temple ( Thurasserikkadavu)
- Vadakke puthukkot paradevatha temple (Thurasserikkadavu)
- Kunnath temple (kizhur junction )
- Thachankuunu Parambil sree bagavathi temple (Thachankunnu)
- Palliyarkkal temple ( Thachankunnu )
- Perumalpuram Shiva temple
- Kizhur ganapathi temple
- Kommath temple ( kizhur )
- Nademmal Badrakali Temple
- Thevar Matam Sandhana Gopala Swami Vishnu Temple
- Valappil Temple

== Notable residents ==
- Olympian P. T. Usha, Indian runner known as "Payyoli express"

== Transportation ==
Payyoli is connected to other parts of India through National Highway 66. The nearest airports are at Kannur and Kozhikode. The nearest railway station is the Payyoli railway station. The northern stretch of National Highway 66 connects to Mangaluru, Panaji and Mumbai and the southern stretch Kozhikode, Kochi, Thiruvananthapuram eventually culminating in Kanyakumari in Tamil Nadu.

== See also ==
- Nadapuram
- Thottilpalam
- Perambra
- Madappally
- Villiappally
- Memunda
- Iringal
- Mahe, Pondicherry
- Thikkodi
- Orkkatteri
