= Perambra =

- Town
- Location in Kerala, India Perambra (India)

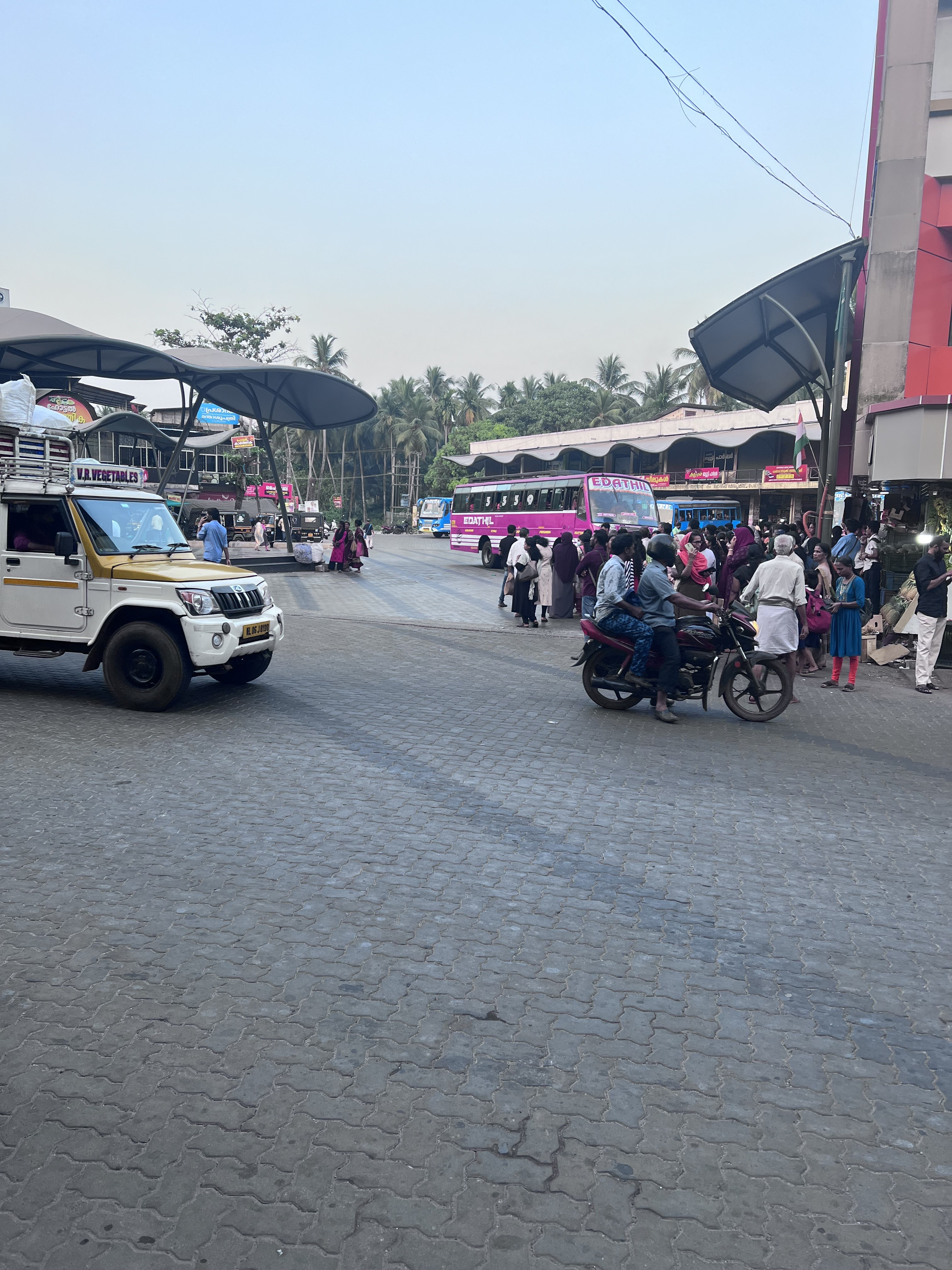
- Coordinates: 11.5575°N 75.7605°E Perambra town
- Country: India
- State: Kerala
- District: Kozhikode

Government
  - Type: Panchayat
  - Body: Perambra Grama Panchayat

Area
  - Total: 26.12 km^{2} (10.08 sq mi)

Population (2011)
  - Total: 32,784
  - Density: 1,255/km^{2} (3,251/sq mi)

Languages
  - Official: Malayalam, English
- Time zone: UTC+5:30 (IST)
- PIN: 673 525
- Telephone code: 91 496
- ISO 3166 code: IN-KL
- Vehicle registration: KL-77
- Website: www.kozhikode.nic.in

Perambra is a major town in Koyilandy taluk of Kozhikode district in Malabar region of Kerala state, India. Perambra is the anglicized form of the original name Payyormala, given during British rule. It is one of the 140 assembly constituencies in Kerala, and one of the 12 block Panchayats in Kozhikode district. Perambra lies almost at the centre of the district. The area which was formerly known as Payyormalanadu, eventually became Perambra. It is located 22 km from Vadakara, 13 km from Kuttiadi and 38 km from Kozhikode. Perambra is situated in the slopes of the Western Ghats.

== History ==
The Illamarankulangara temple at Perambra, also known in some accounts as Payyormala, is traditionally believed to have been built by Illay Maran during the Sangam era. Some sources suggest it is mentioned in Sangam literature, though no concrete archaeological evidence is presently available.

Local folklore connects the temple to a similarly named temple in Kannur. According to the story, a Namboothiri priest from Kannur once visited a Janmi of Payyormala to perform an exorcism. On his return, the deity worshipped at the temple by the Malayars is said to have requested to accompany him to his native place in Kannur. The Chathans surrounding the temple, also requested to be taken along. The Namboothiri reportedly took them all to Kannur.

Historically, Payyormala was under the control of the Koothali Moopil, who held the title ‘Vallabhan Chathan.’ Ancient accounts record that the Koothali Moopil would ceremonially grant Nair titles: a man dressed in dry banana leaves and other foliage would roll before the Moopil, who would confer the title by repeating the name thrice (e.g. 'Kanaran Nair, Kanaran Nair, Kanaran Nair'). These Nair titles are interpreted as part of a quasi-layer between the Vedic (contrary to the Tantric traditions of Malabar) Namboothiri Brahmins and the native ethnic groups, introduced by Vedic Brahmins who sought asylum in Kerala after the Muslim conquest of North India, which historian Will Durant described as “probably the bloodiest story in human history.” Having later integrated into the existing Namboothiri honorific title, they are believed to have used this quasi-layer system as a means to exert influence over native ethnic groups while sustaining themselves through the efforts of others. The word Namboothiri itself is derived from Malayalam rather than Sanskrit, though the Namboothiris ironically regard Sanskrit as their mother tongue. Originally a priestly title conferred on the basis of knowledge and duty in Malabar, it later evolved into a birth based identity.

Later, a family from the northern Malabar region near Mangalore settled in Payyormala. A local tradition recounts that during a temple festival at Illamaran Kulangara, a young man from this family was seen in a compromising situation with the Koothali Moopil’s sister. To avoid social scandal, the Moopil married his sister to the man, granting the family half of the Koothali Moopil’s property. This family later came to be known as the Gosalakkal Thambayis of Perambra.

The Gosalakkal Thambayi family is remembered in local oral histories as powerful feudal landlords. Accounts mention oppressive practices, including one in which a newly married lower caste brides from dalit and smiths were expected to spend her first night with the Thambayi of the Gosalakkal thambayi family at perambra. A custom historically resisted in one instance by an ironsmith (kollan) in 1970s from puttampoyil who demanded the Thamburatti of the Gosalakkal thambayi family be returned to him if the practice were enforced.

Another well known story involves Govindhan Menon thambayi of Vayiltrikkayil, a prominent member from the Gosalakkal Thambayi family. He was the leader of goons for the thambayi family. He was reputedly feared in the region and infamous for his cruelty. After sunset, he would visit the homes of vulnerable families and sexually assault young women. When such incidents occurred repeatedly, complaints reached a family in Valiacode. This family, belonging to the Thiyyar community, was among the few in Perambra who did not adhere to the Gosalakkal Thambayi family’s social norms and showed no deference towards them, as they themselves had wealth, masculinity, and men. They also had strong relatives, which was important in those days, including amsham adhikari and menon (administrative titles given by the British) of Kadiyangad and Palleri, and some who served as judges of the Thalassery court, known as thukkidi in British Malabar (Chathan Menon from this family was a powerful Congress leader in Paleri and Perambra). At the time, the Malabar Sub-Collector was Choorayi Kanaran, who had helped the British in controlling Malabar during colonial rule. The family head assured the complainants that they would retaliate at a time and place of their choosing. One day at the Valiacode toddy shop, Govindhan Menon Thambayi and his companions drank and decided to leave without paying, thinking no one would dare to question him. A fight erupted between them and the members of the family arrived there, where he and his men were beaten by the skilled fighters of the family. Hearing the news, the Gosalakkal Thambayi family sent more men with weapons, but they too were attacked and beaten by the family members. The beating took place at the Valiacode paddy field in front of all the villagers, and news quickly spread. Though spared from being killed at his own request, the incident left him humiliated for the rest of his life. Subsequently, members of the Gosalakkal Thambayi family sought the support of Mappilas in retaliatory disputes. But they could not stand against them, as those men had strong ground support. Thereafter, whenever people saw Govindhan Menon of the Gosalakkal Thambayi family, they would mock him and throw stones at him. Facing widespread local shaming, Govindhan Menon eventually sold his Vayil Trikovil residence. A Mappila group, after raising funds in Kuttiady and Nadapuram, purchased the property. Menon later relocated near the Bharathapuzha region. The Vayithrikovil Kovilakam still stood directly behind the present Perambra bus stand, bearing testament to its history.

The Christian population in the nearby areas of Chembra, Koorachund, and Kakkayam consisted of settlers who had migrated from southern Kerala to the Malabar region, possibly due to an unknown plan during the British era. They paid a small amount to the Gosalakkal Thambayi to clear the forest for settlement. At that time, these areas were covered in dense forest, and few dared to cross what is now called Chembra Palam, fearing various fevers. A small number of Parayar families lived there and opposed the Christian settlement in their locality. For the Christian migrants from the south, dealing with the Parayar community proved difficult. Eventually, the settlers devised a tactic: one day, when a Parayar man had died, they visited his home during the funeral rites and asked, “How much for the dead body?” Believing them to be cannibals, the Parayar families later moved to Cherumala and nearby areas.

The Parayar community in Perambra is noted for having non-Malayali physical characteristics, such as golden hair and features resembling European phenotypes. They may have been early seafarers who arrived in Malabar by ship and, after losing their way, were compelled to live in the hills and mountains, or possibly part of the nomadic gypsy communities once present across India. Kozhikode city was historically a centre for such gypsy groups, who often traveled back and forth.

A famous Congress leader, PK Govindhan, from an aristocratic family called Pudhukudikkandy in Alokoottam, Perambra, was known for his close ties with the Parayar community and often inquired about their concerns. Whether it was for a tournament in the village, the need for a road, or ensuring that the homeless were given shelter, he always stood at the forefront. He would reassure people in Perambra that even if a family lacked gold for a wedding, their daughter’s marriage would not be left incomplete, such was the trust and guarantee he offered to the people. This bond of trust was reflected when he invited the Parayar group to his sister’s wedding. At the time, caste norms dictated that they be seated at the back of the house and on the ground during the feast. However, when he saw them arriving, he instructed his relatives, who were seated on chairs in the main hall, to vacate their seats and sit on the ground. He then invited the Parayar guests to sit on the chairs and served them the wedding feast, with his relatives seated on the floor. This act broke a long standing caste norm in the region. When he died, members of this community would visit his resting place and weep, mourning his loss.

In Alokoottam, there was also a man named Chekkoty, father of the owner of MAB Auto in Perambra, who was fondly called Chekkottyachan. He had served in the British Indian Army and participated in World War II, fighting against German forces in Italy, on the European front. Indian soldiers serving in these campaigns were not merely auxiliary personnel or support staff. Infantrymen were armed with Lee Enfield rifles, Bren light machine guns and other weapons, and fought on the front lines against German formations, assaulting fortified positions, engaging enemy machine gun posts and crossing defended rivers. They were often deployed in exceptionally dangerous positions. Since India was still under British colonial rule, these soldiers served under British imperial command, without an independent Indian national government possessing equivalent sovereign authority to determine or protect their military interests. Known for his eccentric character, he often spoke to people about the end of the world, earning him the nickname “Lokavasanam Chekkotty.” What the locals mockingly called eccentricity was in fact a reflection of post-traumatic stress disorder after World War II (PTSD), a condition common among surviving soldiers of the war that claimed more than 6 crore lives worldwide. It was only in 1980 that PTSD was officially recognized as a mental health diagnosis in the DSM-III, long after veterans like Chekkoty had lived through its consequences.

In Perambra, some members of the Mappila community arrived at the invitation of the Thambayis for the work of Marakkadi canal, intended to prevent flooding during the rainy season. They were brought from Nadapuram and were skilled in this type of work. The broader history of the Mappila community in Perambra, however, is deeply tied to caste oppression during the feudal era. A significant proportion of Mappilas were converts from Dalit communities, who sought refuge from caste-based discrimination by embracing Islam. Conversion was not driven by theological debates between the Bhagavad Gita and the Quran, but rather by the urgent need to escape caste persecution. For instance, even after independence, a Pulayar woman walking along the present Perambra State Highway in front of Gosalakkal was forced to remove her blouse and beaten. In contrast, a Mappila who was only a second-generation convert from the Pulayar community could enter the compound of Gosalakkal, since Brahmanical scriptures did not prescribe rules on how to treat those who had already renounced the caste order imposed on native ethnic groups. The earliest Mappilas in Malabar were children born out of liaisons with Arab traders; and could not be fixed within the caste hierarchy; they were simply referred to as “Ma-ppila.” When Islam later took root in the region, they adopted the faith, as noted by M. G. S. Narayanan.

Following independence, Perambra experienced significant social changes and modernisation. The community adopted new social standards, with the new generations holding greater harmonic views and ideals, and the panchayat grew rapidly, continuing on a path of steady development.

After independence, The last Thambayi of Perambra was known for borrowing money from anyone he encountered, and when unable to repay, he transferred his lands to those creditors, which diversified land ownership and contributed to the development of what is now present-day Perambra town. One of the women from the Gosalakkal Thambayi family, a relative of A. K. Gopalan (AKG), was noted for showing kindness. She was educated and, though her influence extended only to a few privileged women, she initiated vocational training in sewing machines within their compound, established a vocational women’s college. In 1976, she founded Perambra’s first English-medium preparatory school, offering classes from Grade 1 to Grade 4, which provided many students with a strong educational foundation and helped them build successful careers.

Today's Perambra was not originally called Perambra; the name originally referred to what is now known as 'Kizhakkan Perambra'. The present-day Perambra town was earlier called Puliyinte Chottil, possibly due to the presence of a large tamarind tree under which a few vendors sold goods. The site of the current Perambra bus stand was once the bathing pool of the Thambayi. Initially, only a tea shop and a Chettiar selling cloth while seated on the ground, along with a few other small establishments, existed here. Perambra chantha (market) was famous for selling cows and other livestock, attracting people from distant places, including other districts. Perambra High School, established in 1948, has the largest student enrollment in the district. Although it operates under government aid, including the payment of teachers’ salaries from taxpayers of all castes and religions, and the majority of students belong to different castes and religions, the management only employs teachers from their own caste. Typically, after every ten appointments, one teacher from another caste is hired as a safety valve.

In a representative sample of the Kerala population, 88% of the students at Perambra High School come from castes and religions different from that of the management's caste. However, due to the Right to Education Act, the Sarva Shiksha Abhiyan program, and the lack of alternative schools nearby, local families, many of whom cannot afford private education, send their children to this institution. The growing student population has led to an increase in the number of classrooms and consequently, more teacher vacancies, which are again filled by members of the same caste as the management. When no suitable candidate from their caste is available locally, the management hires teachers from distant areas of Kozhikode belonging to the same community. As a result, if a parent happens to be a teacher, their children enjoy the advantages of stability, better educational opportunities, and social mobility privileges that naturally uplift the next generation. However, in Perambra High School, this cycle of progress and fortune is limited to a single caste, selectively promoted by the management at the expense of all others.

Although these teachers are paid monthly salaries by government collected from taxpayers of all castes and religions, the benefits of such government support rarely reach those outside the management’s caste. Historically, people of Perambra worked on paddy fields whose produce was taken by the Gosalakkal Thambayi family, who sold it, paid taxes to the British government, and kept a portion without so much as lifting a coconut from the ground. Their amassed wealth enabled their descendants to migrate abroad and build fortunes, while the local population continued to struggle, even to afford school uniforms, as depicted in the life story of the drama artist Muhammad Perambra.

Sameway, today the descendants of those families and 'their caste' still benefit from schools managed by their kin, where teaching positions funded by the labor of others are monopolized by their own caste. The school reportedly lacks discipline, allowing children from poor families, such as those of autorickshaw drivers and daily wage workers, to fight in the name of “school politics,” a spectacle these same teachers would never permit their own children to engage in. India continues to be governed under Western democracies whose leaders and strategists were educated in institutions free from such distractions.

These same teachers justify these practices in the name of “freedom,” “democracy,” and “naturalistic ideas,” yet they never encourage their own children studying in the same institution to participate. Their children move on to prestigious research institutions and medical colleges, while the children of the poor remain trapped in the same cycle of deprivation.

== Demographics ==
Socio religious demographics of Perambra
Class	Percent
Hindus	70%
Muslims	28%
Christians	2%

As of the 2011 census of India, Perambra had a population of 32,784. Perambra has an average literacy rate of 95.5%, higher than the national average of 74%.

== Block panchayat ==
The block has a population of 1,71,433; (86,019 males and 85414 females). The Perambra block has seven panchayats: Changaroth, Cheruvannur, Kayanna, Koothali, Chakkittapara, Nochad and Perambra.

== Transportation ==
Perambra is connected to Koyilandy, Kozhikode, Vatakara, Balussery. The nearest airports are at Kannur and Kozhikode. The nearest railway station is at Koyilandy. The national highway no.66 passes through Koyilandy and the northern stretch connects to Mangalore, Goa and Mumbai. The southern stretch connects to Cochin and Trivandrum.

== Notable people ==
- K. G. Adiyodi - Politician
- P. Sankaran - Politician
- T. P. Ramakrishnan - Politician
- Noah Nirmal Tom - Athlete
- Rajisha Vijayan - Actress
- Vijilesh Karayad - Actor
- SK Sajeesh - Politician
- Mani Madhava Chakyar - Artist
- Veerankutty - Poet
- N.P Sajeesh - Journalist
- Jinson Johnson - Athlete

== See also ==
- Perambra, Thrissur
- Muthukad
- Chakkittapara
- Kadiyangad
- Nadapuram
- Thottilpalam
- Madappally
- Villiappally
- Memunda
- Iringal
- Mahe, Pondicherry
- Payyoli
- Thikkodi
- Orkkatteri
- Nipah virus outbreaks in Kerala
