= William Logan (author) =

Scottish writer and colonial officer (1841–1914)

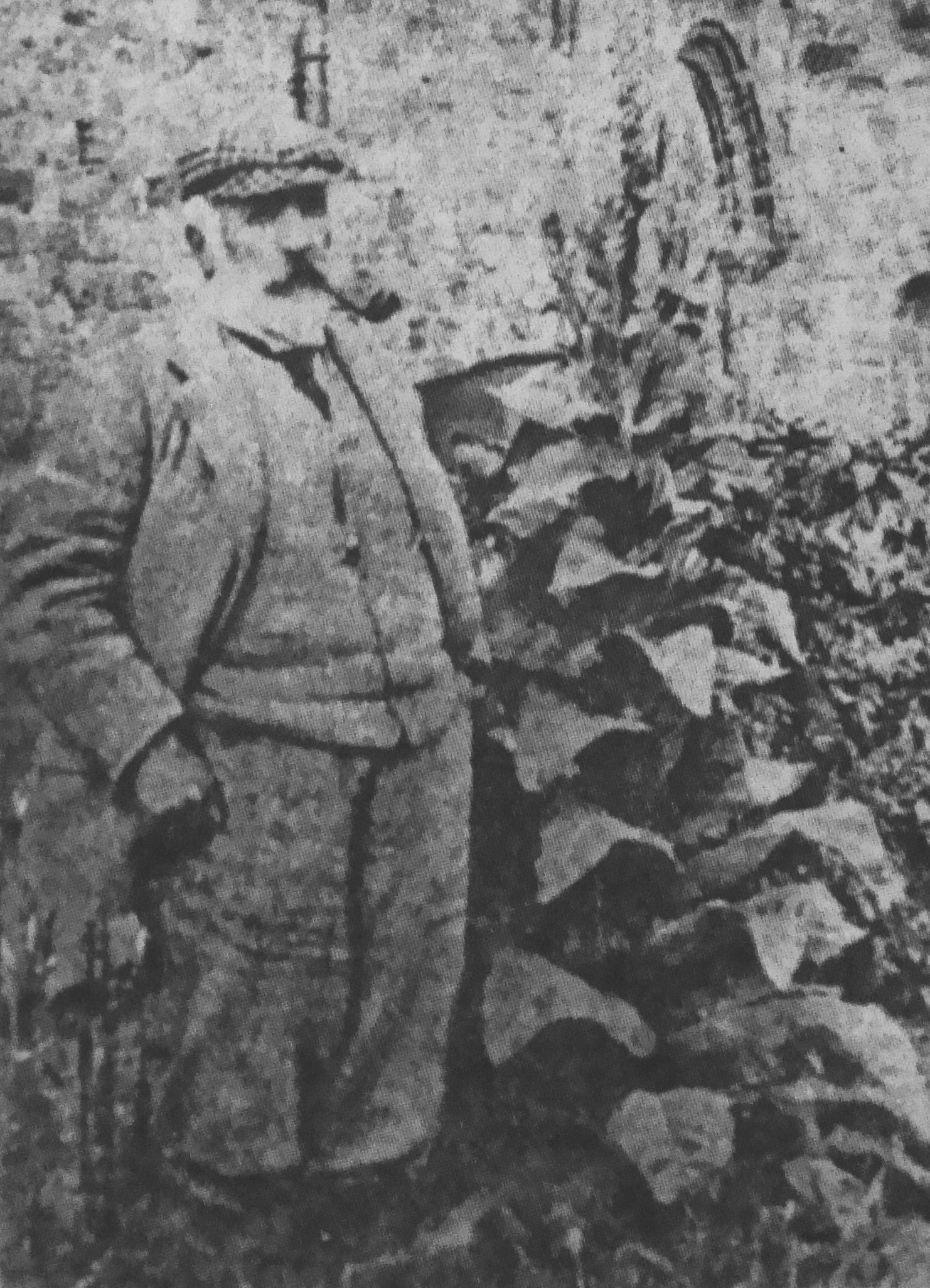
William Logan

William Logan (1841–1914) was a Scottish officer of the Madras Civil Service under the British Government. Before his appointment as Collector of Malabar, he had served in the area for about 20 years in the capacity of Magistrate and Judge. He was conversant in Malayalam, Tamil and Telugu. He is remembered for his 1887 guide to the Malabar District, popularly known as the Malabar Manual.

== Early life ==
William logan was born on 17 May 1841 at Ferney Castle, near Reston – Berwickshire, Scotland. His father was David Logan, an agriculturist and Mother was Elizabeth Hasti. He received his primary education at the Musselberg School near Edinburgh. William, who excelled in his studies, won the Duke's Medal for the most intelligent student. He later joined the University of Edinburgh and appeared for the Madras Civil Service Examination. He also belonged to a peasant family, breaking the monopoly of the rich and aristocratic families that had hitherto existed in the civil service. In December 1872 he married Anne Selby Burrell Wallace, daughter of a banker. She moved to Thalassery along with Logan. Their first child Mary Ord was born in Thalassery in 1873. They later had a son, William Malcolm, in Kozhikode. Elizabeth Helen was born in Scotland in 1877 and her youngest daughter in 1880.

=== In India ===
He came to India in 1862 to serve in the Madras Civil Service. After passing the vernacular examinations in Tamil, Telugu and Malayalam, he was first appointed Assistant Collector and Joint Magistrate in Arcot District and later Sub-Collector in North Malabar (1867) and Joint Magistrate. He returned home in 1872 and returned a year later. This time in Thalassery he was appointed as the Acting District Sessions Judge of North Malabar and as the Collector of Malabar. The following year he was appointed Acting District Sessions Judge of South Malabar. With his appointment as the District Judge of South Malabar, he studied the agricultural problems of the Mappila taluks and the immigration problem created by the colonial rule. In 1875 he became the Malabar Collector. At the same time he also served as the District Magistrate. It was during this time that he began to take a special interest in the popular affairs of the land.

A lengthy report has been prepared after a detailed study on the current Kana-Janma etiquette in Mappilathaluk, Malabar. (1882) This is known as the Malabar Tenancy Report. In the same year he was appointed a Fellow of the University of Madras. He was later promoted to the third Acting Member of the Madras Revenue Board. The following year he became the Acting Resident of Travancore-Kochi (May 1883–February 1884).

In July 1884, it was the turn of the Attappady Valley case. Logan also thwarted a conspiracy by some to seize the Attappady forest, including the Silent Valley. William Logan has been described as a liberal official and historian. Initially, he maintained a unilateral stance, as did other British authorities, but later changed his approach. William Logan's assessment that landlords and the British government were equally responsible for creating the Mappila riots as much as the Mappila tenants shook the British authorities.

=== In administration ===
Logan was very attentive to the economic development of Malabar. He understood the characteristics of the plantation industry. He recommended the expansion of crops such as Liberian coffee, vanilla, cocoa and rubber. Plans have been prepared to develop the Kozhikode port. While an acting resident in Travancore, he recommended a railway to connect Thiruvananthapuram with Madurai. Attempts by private individuals to seize the Silent Valley in Attappady were thwarted by clear evidence to challenge in court. He was instrumental in declaring Attappady a government forest. When the Malabar district was formed, he worked for Mappila schools in South Malabar. He recommended legislation that would give tenants permanent rights to the land. He observed that the Malayalees would be liberated only if the centuries-old marriage ended.

== Later life ==
He left India in 1887. William Logan, who returned to England after a long career in India, spent the rest of his life enjoying hunting, shooting and golf. He had four houses in his own country. He died April 3, 1914, at his home in Collington, Edinburgh.

== Legacy ==
His work and life in Thalassery is commemorated there by Logan's Road, the main road that cuts across the town.

== Books ==
Malabar by William Logan (popularly known as the Malabar Manual) is an 1887 publication commissioned by the Government of Madras, and originally published in two volumes. It is a guide to the Malabar District under the Presidency of Madras in British India, compiled during Logan's tenure as Collector of Malabar. It is an exhaustive volume giving the details of the geography, people, their religion and castes, language and culture. It depicts the life and style of the vernacular people of Malabar District, with notes on the life of members of the East India Company.

The work was later followed up by the Malabar Gazetteer of 1908, written by Charles Alexander Innes.
