= Malabar Manual =

1887 publication by William Logan

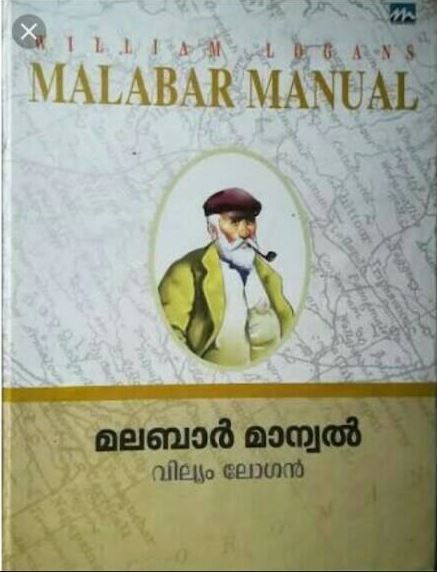
- 1951 bookcover
- Author: William Logan
- Language: English
- Publisher: William Logan, British East India company
- Publication date: 1887
- Publication place: India
- Pages: 760
- ISBN: 81-206-0446-6 re publication by Mathrubhumi

The Malabar Manual was an 1887 publication by William Logan, a Scottish officer of the Madras Civil Service under the British Government, appointed the Collector of Malabar. The work was commissioned by the Government of Madras, and originally published in two volumes. The book was originally named as Malabar later renamed as Malabar Manual by Kerala gazetters department. Logan spent about 20 years in Kerala as an acting resident collector and later judge under the English East India Company. The Malabar Manual is a collection of information and assumptions obtained from his travels and studies. Malabar Manual is a veritable book of accurate informations in relation to the geography, mountains and rivers, geology, climate and natural phenomena, flora and fauna, the people, their economy, ethnography, caste and occupations, manners and customs, religion, language, literature, the state of education and such other details. As the administrative head of the district he had access to a vast resources and he also had a dedicated stream of resourceful natives working under him, whose contributions have also gone into the making of Malabar Manual. Revised editions and Malayalam translations are available today.

== History of publications ==
In 1879 Logan had edited and published a book titled A Collection of Treaties, Engagements and Other Papers of Importance: Relating to British Affairs in Malabar which is a carefully edited collection of all the administrative orders, proceedings and other documents related to British Malabar.

This District Gazetteer was published in 1887 by the Government of Madras and in 1906 and 1951 and by the Gazetteers Department of the Government of Kerala in 2000. When the Gazetteers Department of the Government of Kerala brought out a reprint of the book in the year 2000, it was titled William Logan’s Malabar Manual in a marked deviation from the original title used by Logan. Malabar has also been published by private publishers such as the Asian Educational Services in Delhi. In the 880s, the Government of India launched a project to publish the India Gazetteer and district manuals on the history and culture of the respective districts. District Collector William Logan was entrusted with the responsibility of Malabar. The first volume of Manuel was published in 1887. He received 1000 rupees as a reward for this work.

== Chapters ==
The book has four chapters and subsections.

1. Chapter One - Province - Boundaries, Geographical Features, Mountains, Rivers, Backwaters and Streams
2. Chapter Two - People - describes different castes, such as population, population density, social status, cities, villages, houses, language, literature, education, caste and occupation, customs and traditions.
3. Chapter Three - History - Explains Traditional Archeology, Early History, Dutch, English and French Occupations, Occupation of Mysore and British Domination.
4. Chapter Four - Land - in which sub-sections refer to land tax and revenue assessment.

== Review ==
Published in 2 volumes, the book occasionally uses illustrations and maps. It is very valuable because it is a documentary of the 1880s. Although the Malabar Manual can be seen as a historical book, the author cannot be seen as a historian. The reason is that he does not enter into objective or theoretical interpretations. However, many historians believe that his views in the absence of scientific methodology can sustain it as a historical narrative. Although manuals on the various districts of the Madras Province were published in the last decades of the last century, Malabar is the only manual that attracts historians and scholars as a valuable contribution to them. The first chapter provides geographical information. Chapter 2 describes religion, caste, customs, language and literature in detail. The third chapter is the history of Malabar. The cultural heritage of the area, the early history available through other means, the arrival of the Portuguese. This chapter deals with the competition for pepper and other commodities, the Mysore invasion and British rule. Chapter 4 provides information on tenancy and land tax.

Logan was aware of the limitations of writing the ancient history of Kerala. Scholars such as Hulsch, Burnell, and Ellis began to study ancient inscriptions, but records of the Chera kings were only found later. He has examined the traditional documents of Kerala origin. He accepts the description of the collective control of a Nair political group as illustrated in it but denies that there was a monopoly of land control by the Brahmin hegemony. Logan has expressly acknowledged the contributions of two natives, O. Kannan and Kunju Menon, both of whom were officers of the colonial administration, for providing him with valuable notes on many subjects

Food economist, Dr. M Raghavan says that Logan's accounts about having a largely famine free Malabar during the 18th and 19th centuries are factually incorrect.
