= Kavilumpara =

- village
- Location in Kerala, India Kavilumpara (India)
- Coordinates: 11.6775°N 75.7800°E
- Country: India
- State: Kerala
- District: Kozhikode

Languages
  - Official: Malayalam, English
- Time zone: UTC+5:30 (IST)
- Vehicle registration: KL-

Kavilumpara is an agricultural village in northeastern Kozhikode district in Kerala. It shares a border with Wayanad District.

== Geography ==
The village is surrounded by mountains and forest reserves and it is near the origin of the Kuttiady River. There is Poozhithodu Weir which is part of a small Power project which is a run – off the river scheme utilizing water from Illiani puzha and Kadanthrapuzha.

== Education ==
The village has two high schools and a veterinary hospital.

A. J. John Memorial High School (A. J. J. M. H. S.) is a high school located in the village (Location: Chathangottunada). It is named after A. J. John, Anaparambil. It is managed by the Missionary Congregation of the Blessed Sacrament (or MCBS Sabha). It is an aided school, and hence run by government funding. Government, however, has no role in the management of this school since in Kerala there is a system where the government funds schools, but all expenditures go to private and religious management.

== Transportation ==
Kavilumpara village connects to other parts of India through Vatakara town on the west and Kuttiady town on the east. National highway No.66 passes through Vatakara and the northern stretch connects to Mangalore, Goa and Mumbai. The southern stretch connects to Cochin and Trivandrum. Kerala State Highway 54 going through Kuttiady connects to Mananthavady, Mysore and Bangalore. The nearest airports are at Kannur and Kozhikode. The nearest railway station is at Vatakara.
