= Memunda =

- Village
- Location in Kerala, India Memunda (India)
- Coordinates: 11°36′2″N 75°38′2″E
- Country: India
- State: Kerala
- District: Kozhikode

Population
  - Total: 10,960 (2,001)

Languages
  - Official: Malayalam, English
- Time zone: UTC+5:30 (IST)
- PIN: 673104
- Telephone code: 496252
- Vehicle registration: KL-18
- Nearest city: Calicut
- Sex ratio: 3.2 ♂/♀
- Literacy: 81.3,%
- Lok Sabha constituency: Vatakara

Memunda is a village near Vatakara town in Kozhikode district of Kerala, south India. The Lokanarkavu Temple is located at Memunda.

== Geography ==
Memunda is located on the east coast(6 km away) of Arabian Sea. It is surrounded by two hills, Muthappan hill and Valiya Mala.

== History ==
The story of Thacholi Othenan is related to Memunda. Many exploits of Thacholi Othenan, the hero of the ballads of north malabar (Vadakkan Pattukal) were held in is the Lokanarkavu, in Memunda. Annual ceremonies are conducted in memory of "Othenan" whose birthplace is Manikoth, Meppayil near Memunda.

== Tourism ==
The main attraction in Memunda is the 'Lokanarkavu Utsavam' (festival) during the months of Vrishchikam (November–December) and Meenam (March–April). The village has three rock-cut caves. The majority of the residents of Memunda are day laborers although there also reside many architects, teachers, and remote workers. There is also Kunnoth Para Quarry, a rock quarry in Memunda.

== Constituent villages of Memunda ==
- Memunda
- Keezhal
- Kavil
- Kuttoth
- Arakulngara
- Bankroad

== Transportation ==
Memunda is connected to other parts of India through Vatakara city in the west and Kuttiady in the east. National Highway 66 passes through Vatakara and the northern stretch connects to Mangalore, Goa and Mumbai. The southern stretch connects to Cochin and Trivandrum. The eastern Highway going through Kuttiady connects to Mananthavady, Mysore and Bangalore. The nearest airports are at Kannur and Kozhikode. The nearest railway station is at Vatakara.
