= Madappally, Vatakara =

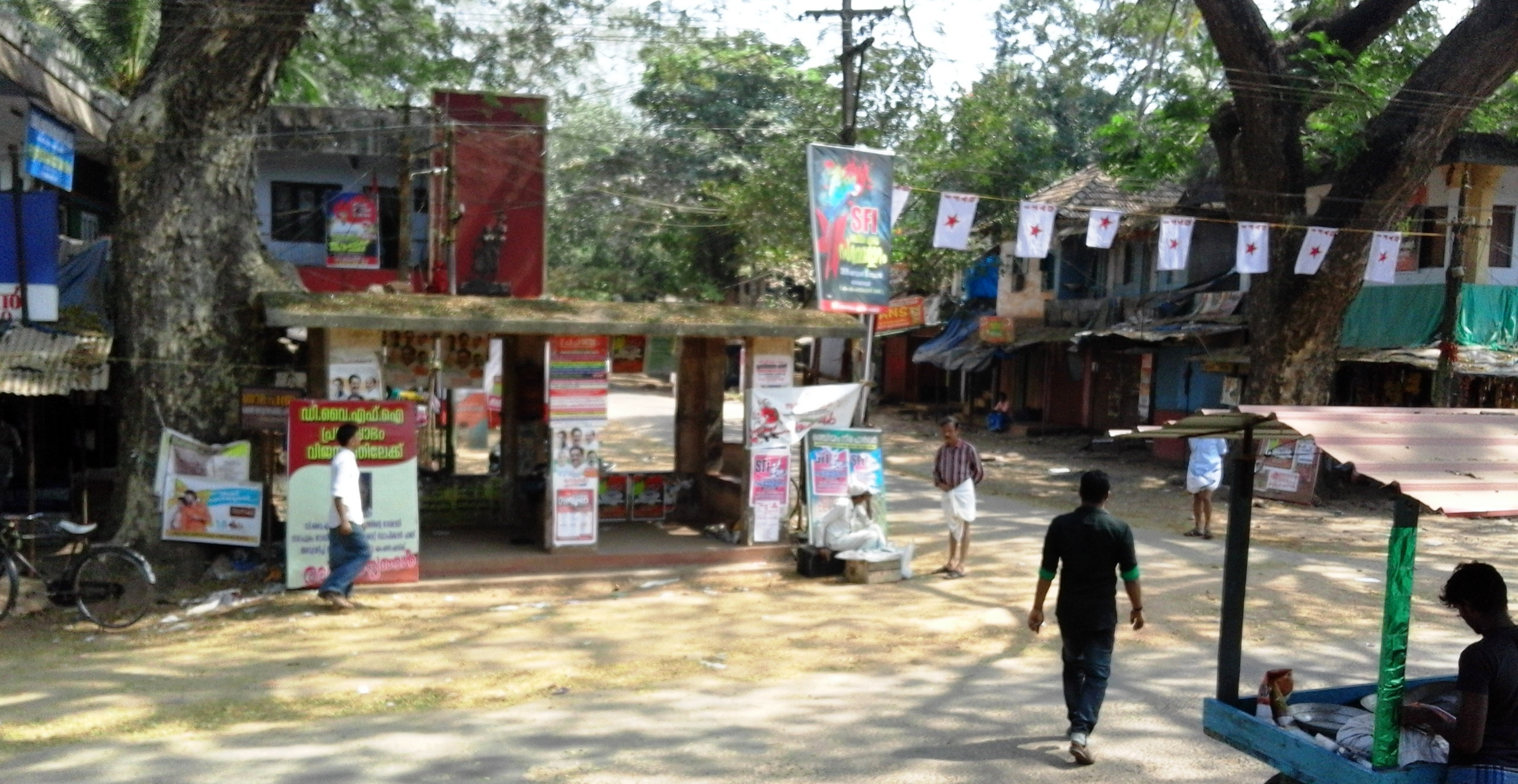

- Location in Kerala, India Madappally, Vatakara (India)
- Coordinates: 11.64349°N 75.57098°E

Madappally is a small town near Vatakara in Kozhikode District, Kerala, India.

The 'Pally' name denotes Buddhism. Pally is still the most popular affix used along with place, plot and family names in Kerala, Tamil Nadu, Karnataka and Andhra. The Pali word Pally means a non Hindu/ Brahmanic place of worship. In the ancient times it denoted a Jain or Buddhist shrine.

According to Ajay S Shekhar, Madappally was one of the world renowned Buddhist shrines of worship, learning, health care and nature conservation.

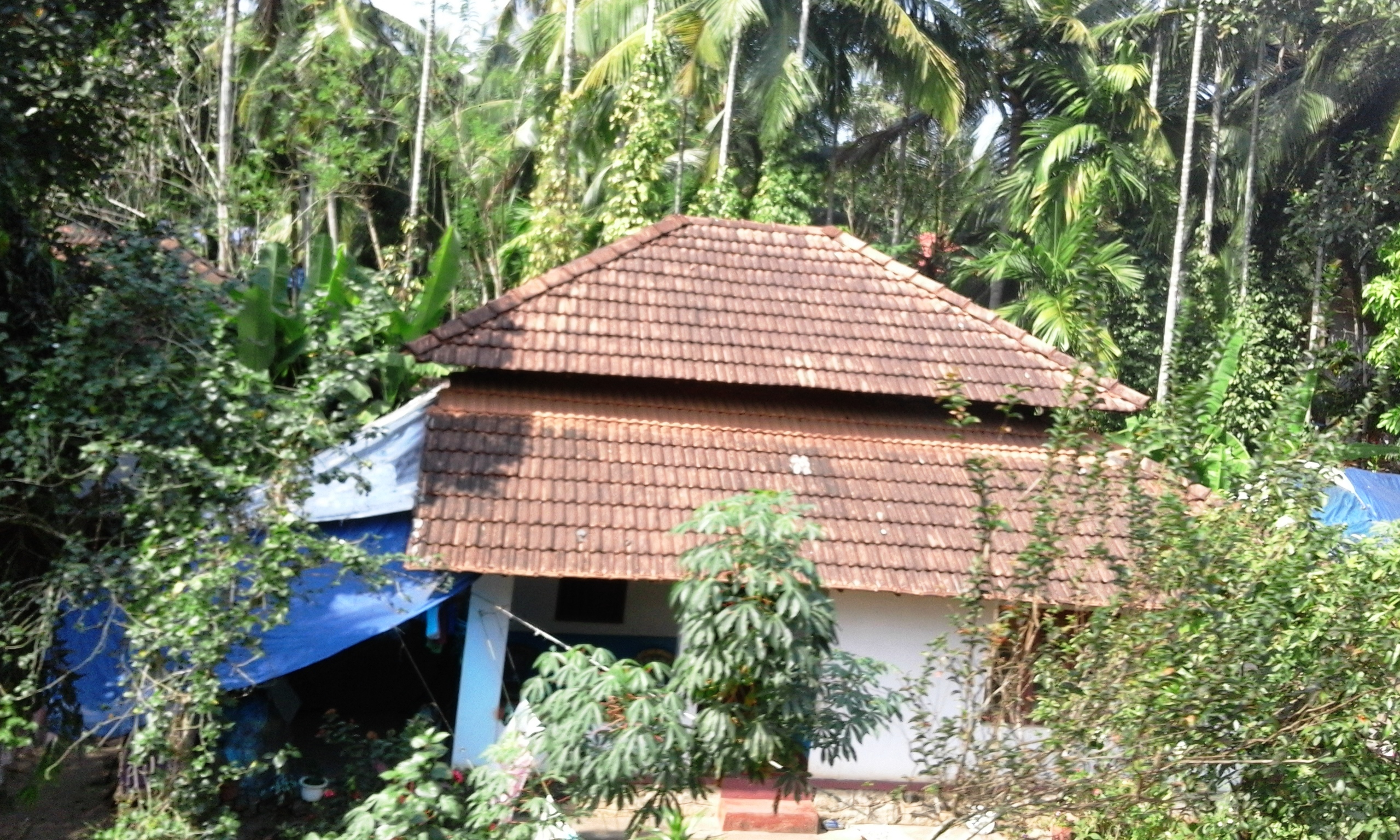
Traditional house in Madappally, Vatakara

== Transportation ==
Madappally is on National Highway 17 and Mahé, Puducherry is the nearest city on the north. Vatakara is the nearest town towards the southern side.

== Government College, Madappally ==
Government College, Madappally is a post-graduate campus affiliated to the University of Calicut.

== See also ==
- Onchium
- Orkkatteri
- Azhiyur
- Vatakara
