= Kuttiady =

- Village
- Location in Kerala, India Kuttiady (India)
- Coordinates: 11°39′15″N 75°45′14″E
- Country: India
- State: Kerala
- District: Kozhikode

Government
  - Type: India

Area
  - Total: 15.23 km^{2} (5.88 sq mi)

Population (2011)
  - Total: 19,351
  - Density: 1,271/km^{2} (3,291/sq mi)

Languages
  - Official: Malayalam
- Time zone: UTC+5:30 (IST)
- Postal code: 673508
- Legislative assembly: Kuttiady

Kuttiady is one of the fastest growing town in Kozhikode district, situated on the banks of the Kuttiady River in Kerala, India. It is located on the slope of the Western Ghats. Kuttiady is one among the 140 legislative assemblies in Keralam.

== Demographics ==
As of 2011 India census, Kuttiady panchayat had a population of 19351 with 10251 males and 9550 females. In Kuttiady, 11.59% of the population is under 6 years of age.
