= Farook College =

Educational institute in Kerala

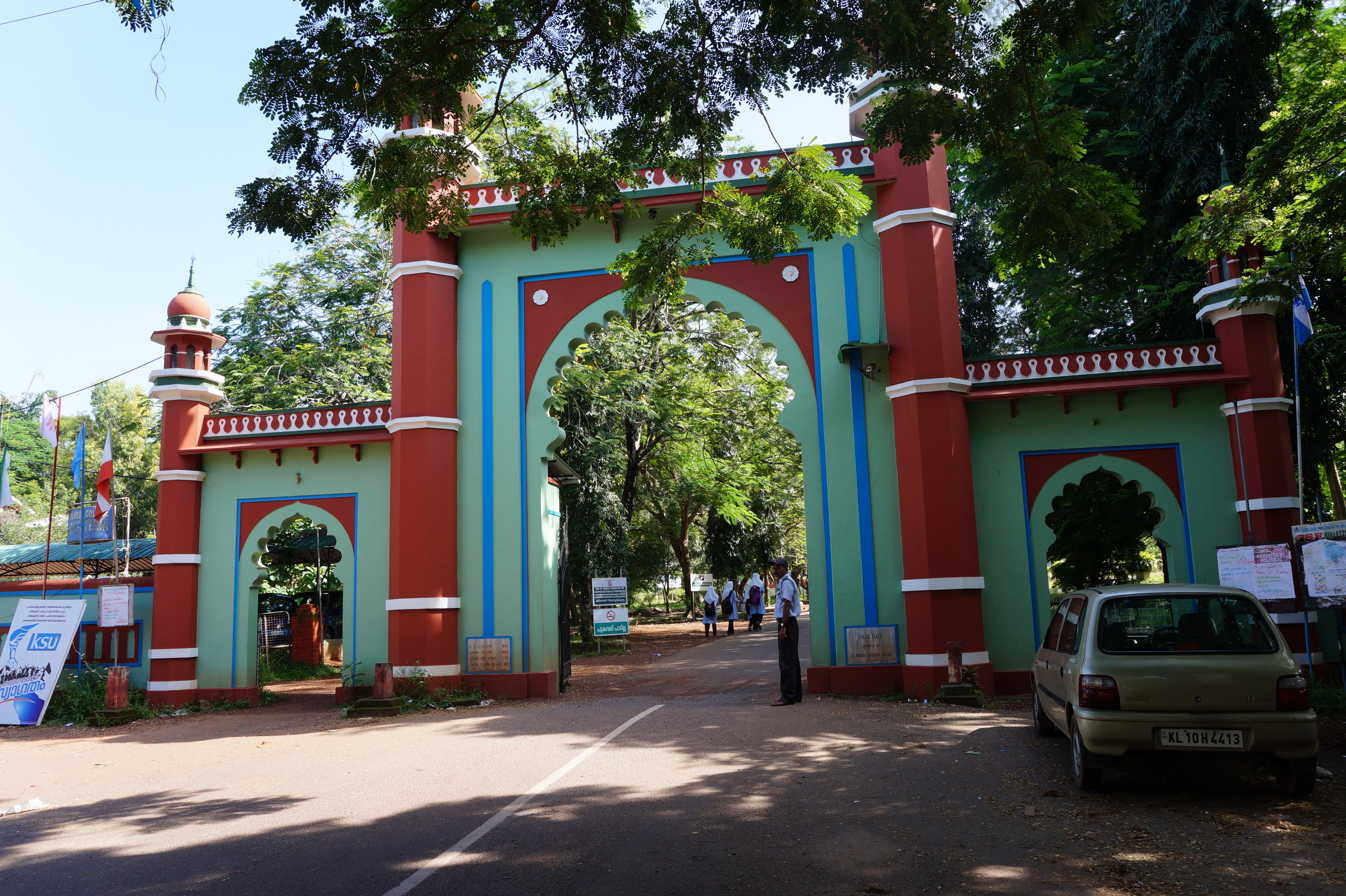
- Motto: Ora et Labora (Pray and Work)
- Type: Public
- Established: 1948
- Academic affiliations: University of Calicut, 'A++' Grade (accredited by NAAC)
- Principal: Aysha Swapna
- Location: Kozhikode, Kerala, 673632, India; 11.1984099°N 75.8570141°E
- Website: www.farookcollege.ac.in
- Location within Kerala Location within India

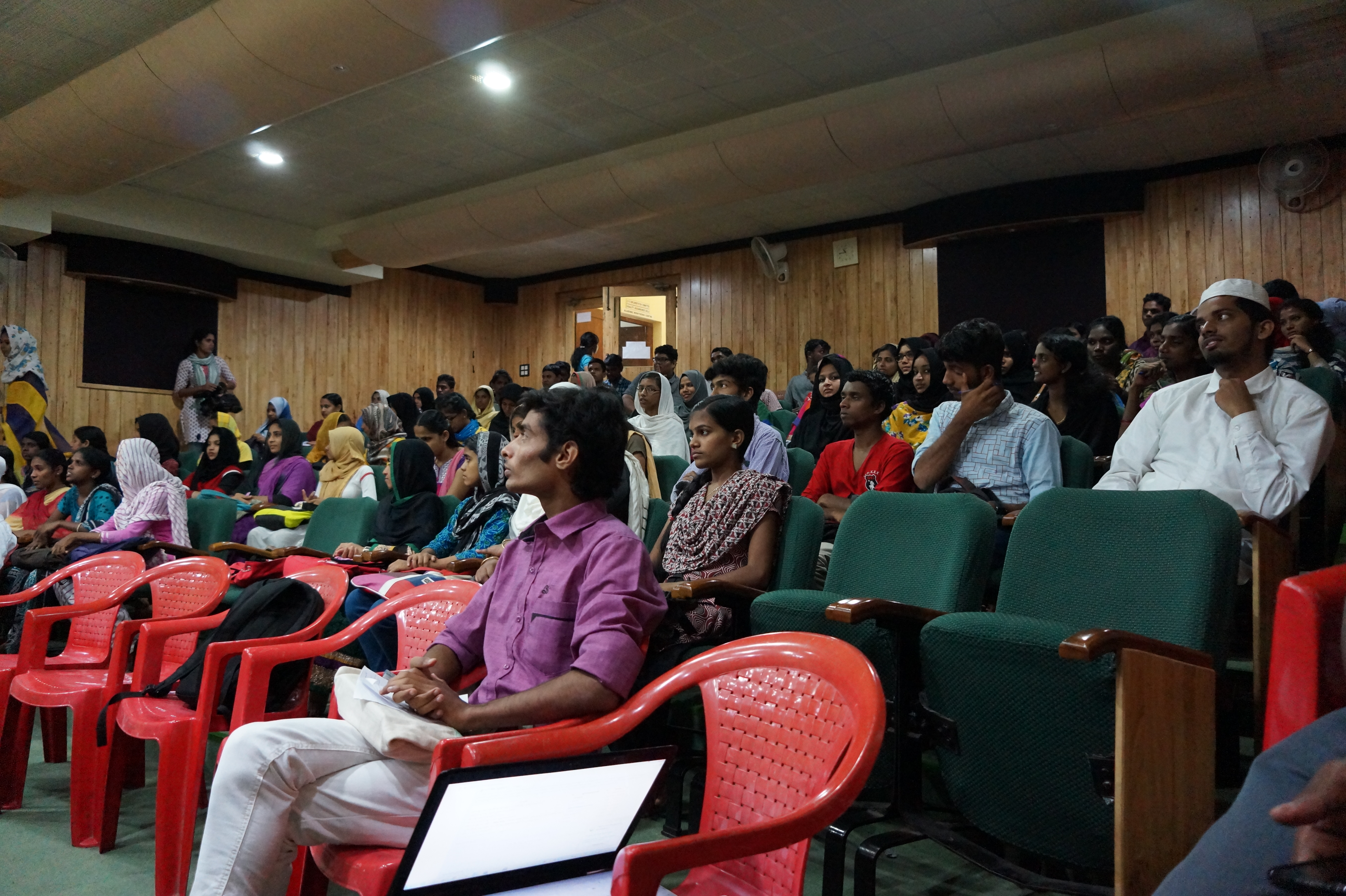
Wikipedia Meet at Farook College

Farook College is a government-aided, autonomous, arts and science college located in Feroke near Kozhikode, Kerala, India. It is the largest residential post-graduate aided institution in Kerala affiliated to the University of Calicut; it was granted autonomous college status in 2015. It is among the best 100 colleges in India as per the National Institutional Ranking Framework 2025.

Established in 1948, Farook College has been identified by the University Grants Commission of India as a College with Potential for Excellence (CPE), the first college under Calicut University to receive the status. It was accredited by NAAC at 5-star level in 2002 and re-accredited at A+ in 2016 and A++ in 2025. It is the winner of Moulana Azad National Literacy Award, R. Sanker Award (two times) for the best first-grade college in the state and the winner of a campus award of University of Calicut among Arts and Science colleges.

== Location ==
The college is on a hillock near the Sales Tax Checkpost at Feroke-Chungam on Chaliyar river 5 km from Feroke Railway Station, 14 km from the city of Calicut and at a distance of 16 km from Kozhikode Airport.

The entire campus comprising the college, its hostels, the staff quarters and its sister concerns covers an area of 72 acres. The entire village is popularly called 'Farook College' and has a post office called 'Farook College'.

The name of the village was 'Iru-mooli-Parambu' or the 'land of the humming wind' but the locals started calling the place 'Farook College Town' once the college started functioning in 1948. Today the village looks like a township with several colleges, schools and training organizations.

== History ==
The college was founded by the Rouzathul Uloom Association led by Moulavi Abussabah Ahmed Ali. The college came under the University of Kerala in 1957 and under the University of Calicut in 1968.

The college built the Raja Gate in 1961 and added an indoor stadium in 1976. The Abussabah Library Complex was inaugurated in 2002 and the Digital Library was commissioned in 2009. The college added the Diamond Jubilee Block in 2013 which has since been used as the post-graduate block and the research block in 2016.

== Programmes ==
Farook college offers programmes in various disciplines viz. 21 undergraduate, 16 postgraduate and 11 research programmes.

== Notable alumni ==
- Bahadoor, Indian actor
- T. V. Chandran, film director
- T. Damodaran film director
- T. K. Hamza, former Minister and MP
- K. A. Jayaseelan, poet, essayist, linguist
- Purushan Kadalundy, MLA
- Akbar Kakkattil, Indian short-story writer and novelist
- Najeeb Kanthapuram, MLA
- P. K. Kunhalikutty, MLA
- Shafi Parambil, MLA
- Thalappil Pradeep, scientist
- P. T. A. Rahim, MLA
- P. A. Mohammed Riyas, Minister of PWD and Tourism
- M. P. Abdussamad Samadani, MP
- Sithara, singer
- V. R. Sudheesh, writer

== Farook College township ==
The township around the college is also called Farook College town. There are a few restaurants, bookstalls and cool bars mainly catering to the students of its colleges and schools. There are around five mosques and two temples in the campus. Private buses conduct dedicated trips to the college throughout the day. The nearest bigger town is called Ramanattukara Junction at a distance of three kilometres. Calicut city is 15 kilometres away.

== Munambam land issue ==
Farook college management sold out land at Munambam which was registered as waqf property leading to fears of eviction and protests by Munambam residents. The issue became a major political controversy in Kerala.

== Image gallery ==
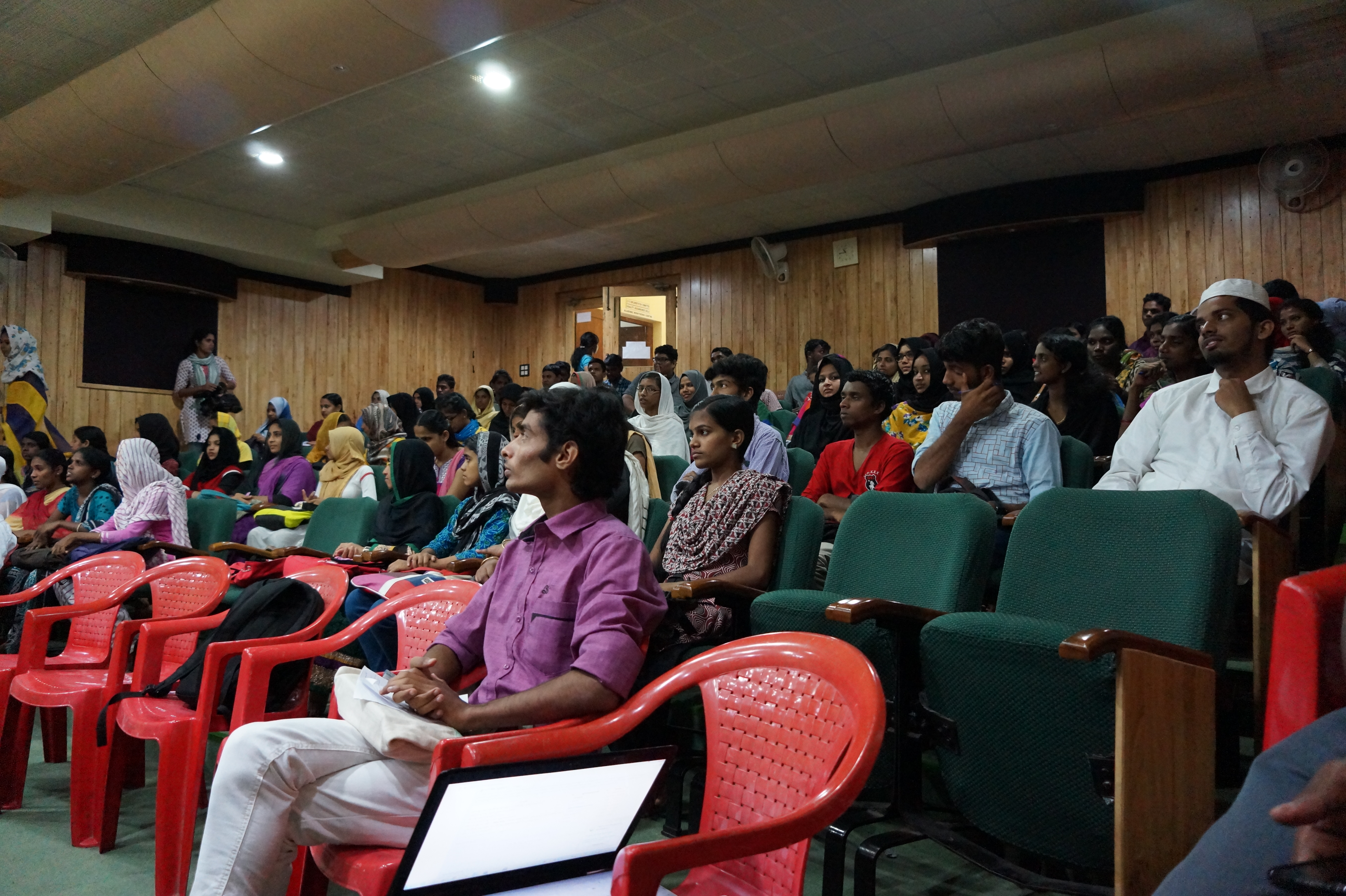
Wikipedia Meet

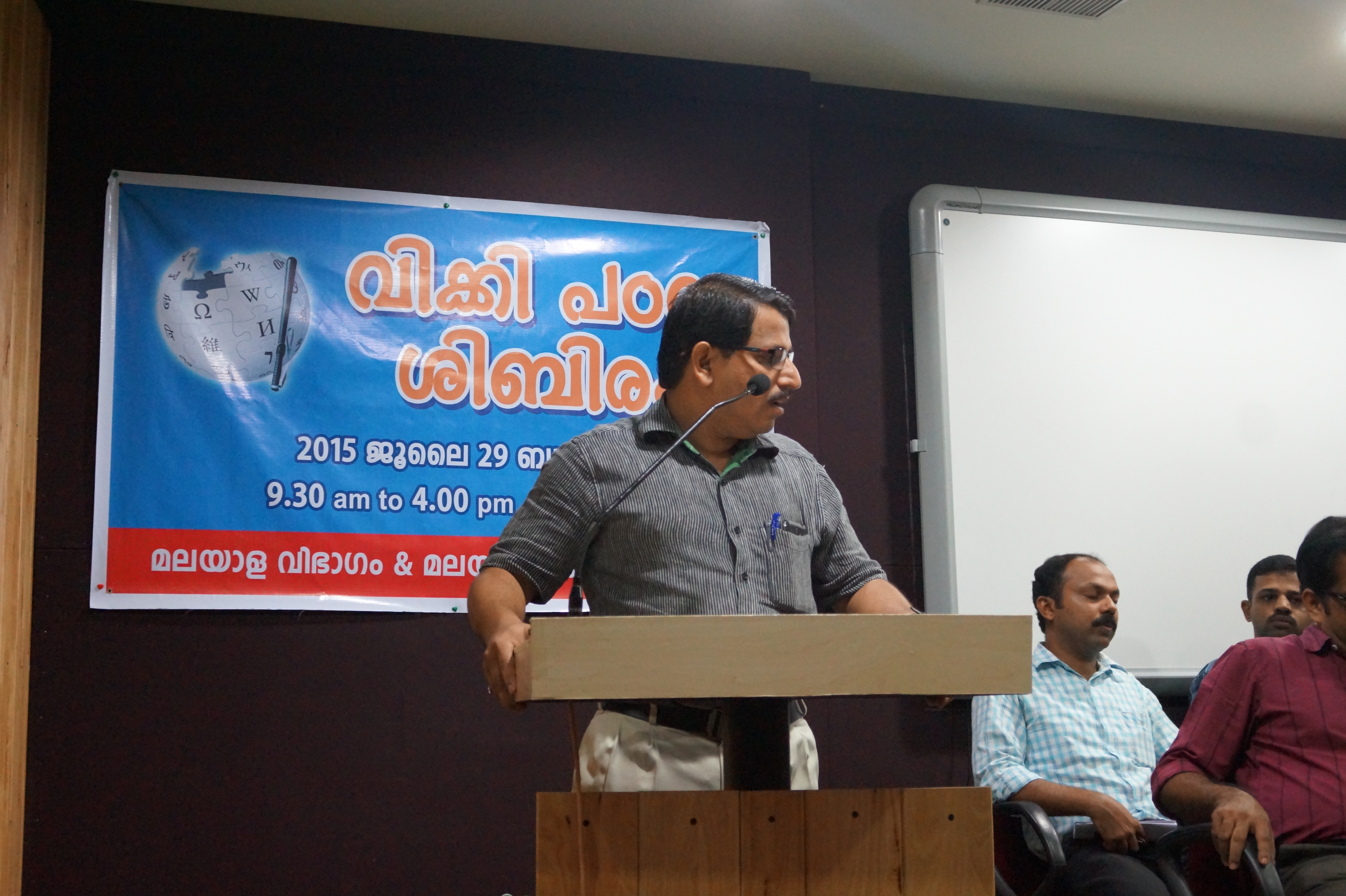
Wikipedia seminar

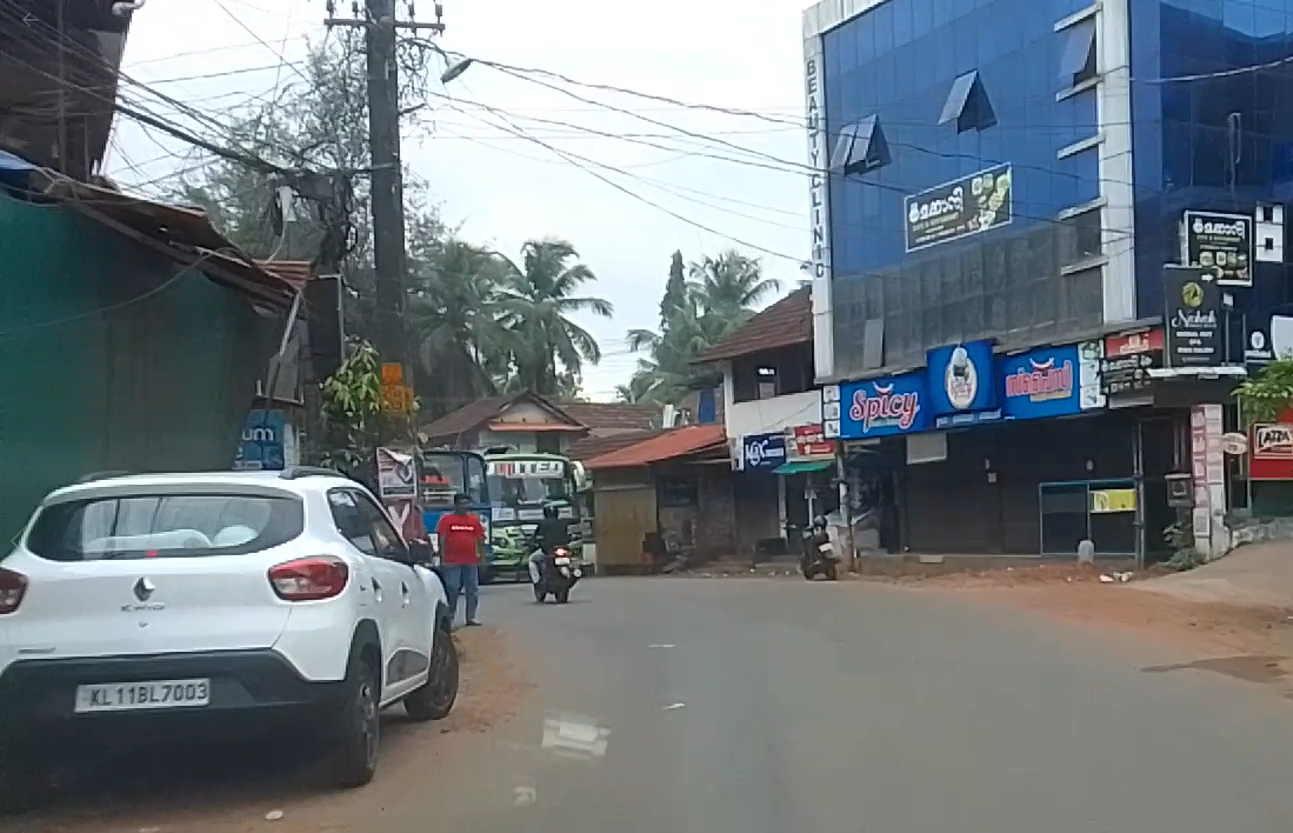
Farook College Angadi

== See also ==
- Education in India
- Education in Kerala
- Feroke
- University of Calicut
- List of institutions of higher education in Kerala
- List of colleges affiliated to the University of Calicut
