= Kinalur inscription =

Kinalur Inscription
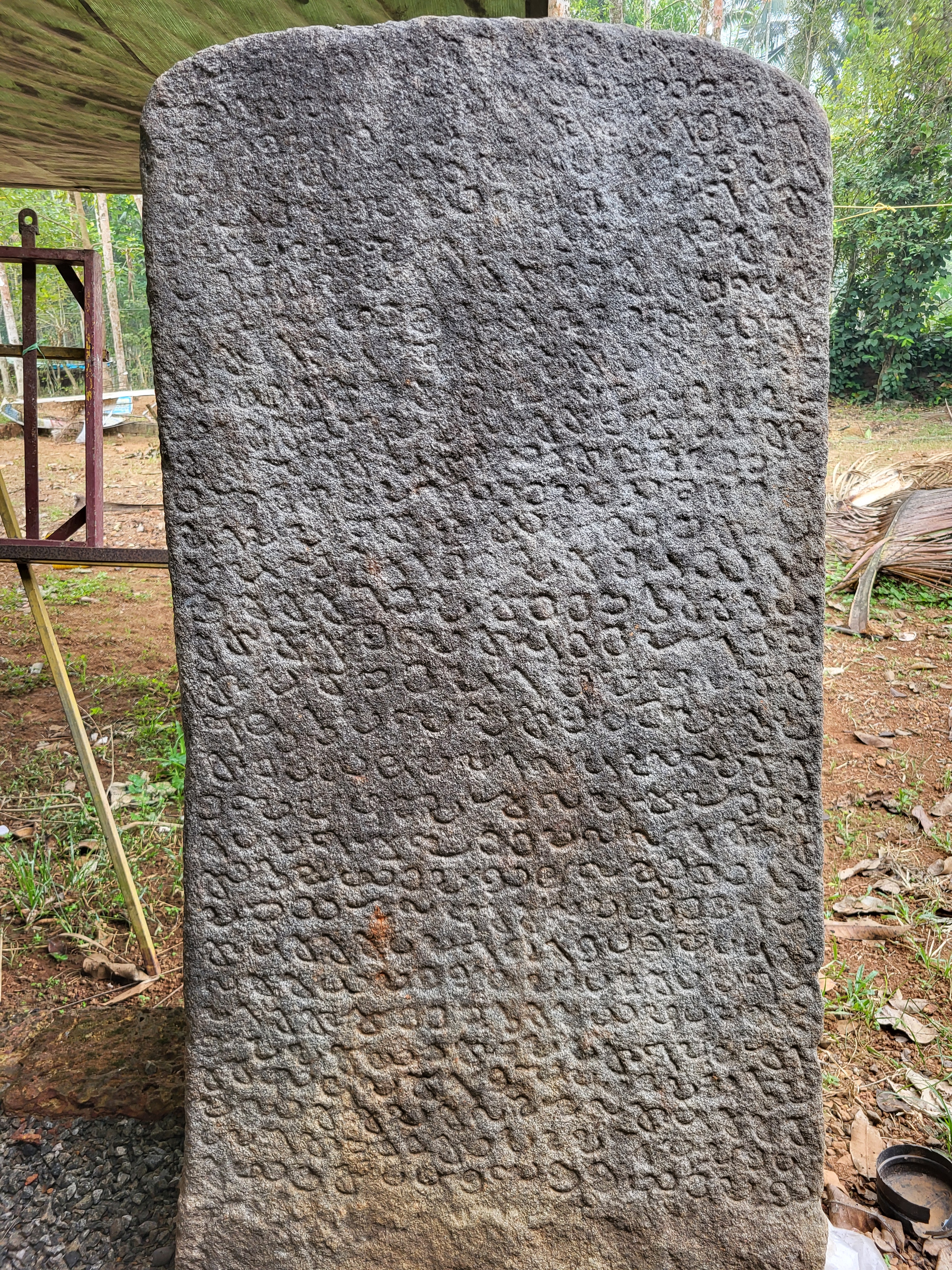
- Kinalur Inscription
- Material: Granite
- Writing: Early Malayalam
- Created: c. 1083 AD; Kerala
- Present location: Kinalur Maha Shiva Temple

The Kinalur inscription (c. 1083 AD) is a Jain record from Kinalur, near Balussery town, around 30 km northeast of Kozhikode (Calicut) in north Kerala. The inscription describes the donations made by Arappan Kunchi, the chieftain of Kurumpurai Nadu, to the "Kunavaynallur Vijayaragishwaram Jain Temple".

The old Malayalam record, written in the Vattezhuthu (script) with the necessary Grantha characters, reveals that the ancient name of the Kinalur village was "Kunavaynallur". It appears that Kunavaynallur was named after the Thirukkunavay Shrine, a lost Jain temple near Kodungallur. The inscription is engraved on both sides of a single granite slab, which was discovered in the compound of the Puvembayi Shiva Temple. An estampage of the record is preserved in the Government Epigraphist's Office, Mysore.

The record is dated to the 189th consecration/installation year of "Thiru Kaliya Padara" (that is, 189 years after the establishment of the Kunavaynallur Vijayaragishwaram Jain Temple), with the astronomical details of Jupiter in Makaram, the month of Medam, Wednesday, and the Avittam star, corresponding to c. 1083 CE.

- Arappan Kunchi the Kurumpurai (the chieftain of Kurumpurai Nadu), donated lands to the Kunavaynallur Jain Temple and leased them to Chathan Arukkadi of Tiruvanchikkalam, Kuntan Chiru Nanga, and Chathan Chirukanthan for the following provisions: Thiruppali Shanthi (routine worship), Kudai (umbrella), Chanthanam (sandal paste), Pallithamam (garland for the deity), Nanda-villakku (permanent temple lamp), Akkiram (Brahmin feeding), and Koothu (temple dance).
- Another shrine called the "Manukulasekharanallur Jain Temple" is also mentioned in the inscription. The record further refers to the Munnuttuvar, the leader of the Three Hundred Nair warriors of Kurumpurai Nadu, and certain "Muvayiravar" ("the Three Thousand"). Both officers were required to guarantee regular payment to the temple after removing any obstacles.
