= Elathur Assembly constituency =

Constituency of the Kerala legislative assembly in India

Elathur
- Constituency No. 26 for the Kerala Legislative Assembly
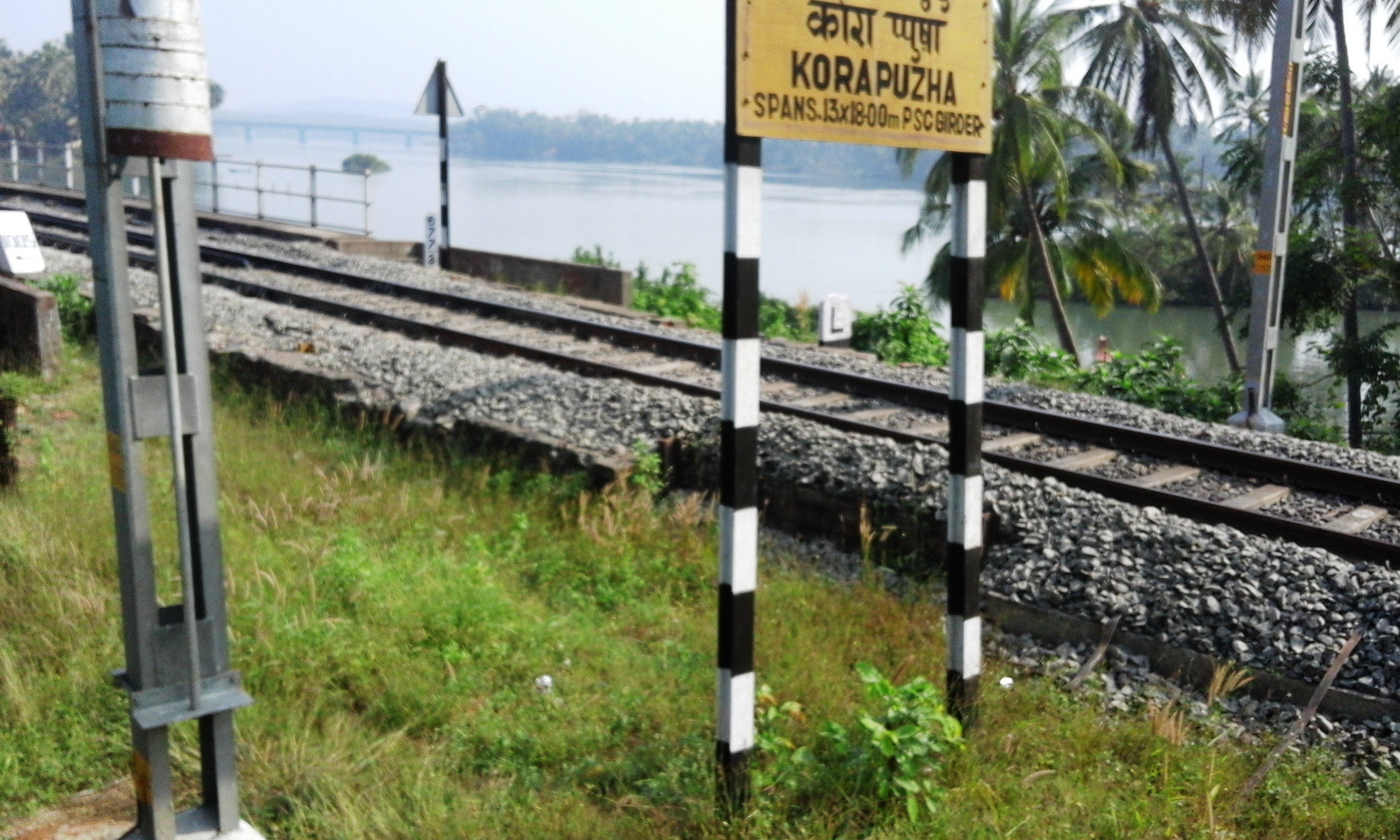
- Korappuzha Bridge name board in Elathur Assembly constituency

Constituency details
- Country: India
- Region: South India
- State: Kerala
- District: Kozhikode
- Established: 2008
- Total electors: 2,11,797 (2026)
- Reservation: None

Member of Legislative Assembly
- 16th Kerala Legislative Assembly
- Incumbent Vidya Balakrishnan
- Party: INC
- Elected year: 2026

Elathur State assembly constituency is one of the 140 state legislative assembly constituencies in Kerala in southern India. It is also one of the seven state legislative assembly constituencies included in Kozhikode Lok Sabha constituency. As of the 2026 Assembly election, the current MLA is Vidya Balakrishnan of INC.

== Local self-governed segments ==
Elathur Assembly constituency is composed of the following six wards of the Kozhikode Municipal Corporation (Elathur) in Kozhikode Taluk, and 6 Gram Panchayats in the same Taluk:

Wards of Kozhikode Municipal Corporation in Elathur Constituency
Ward no.	Name	Ward no.	Name	Ward no.	Name
1	Elathur	2	Chettikulam	3	Eranjikkal
4	Puthur	5	Mokavur	75	Puthiyappa

Other Local Bodies in Elathur Constituency
Name	Local Body Type	Taluk
Chelannur	Grama panchayat	Kozhikode
Kakkodi	Grama panchayat	Kozhikode
Kakkur	Grama panchayat	Kozhikode
Kuruvattur	Grama panchayat	Kozhikode
Nanmanda	Grama panchayat	Kozhikode
Thalakkulathur	Grama panchayat	Kozhikode

== Members of Legislative Assembly ==
The following list contains all members of Kerala Legislative Assembly who have represented the constituency:

Year	Name	Political party
2011	A. K. Saseendran	Nationalist Congress Party
2016	A. K. Saseendran	Nationalist Congress Party
2021	A. K. Saseendran	Nationalist Congress Party
2026	Adv. Vidya Balakrishnan	Indian National Congress

== Election results ==
=== 2026 ===
There were 2,11,797 registered voters in Elathur constituency for the 2026 legislative assembly election.

2026 Kerala Legislative Assembly election: Elathur
Party	Candidate	Votes	%	±%
INC	Adv Vidya Balakrishnan	77,662	43.69	−
NCP-SP	A. K. Saseendran	65,500	36.85	New entry
BJP	T. Devadas	31,510	17.73	▼1.75
NOTA	None of the above	729	0.41	▼0.08
Independent	V. K. Saseendran s/o Ramakrishnan	726	0.41	−
NCP	P. K. Saseendran s/o Sabudasan	692	0.39	▼50.50
SUCI(C)	P. M. Sreekumar	481	0.27	−
AAP	Abdul Basith Atholi	348	0.20	
Independent	Adv. Sumin S. Nedungadan	117	0.07	−
Margin of victory		12,162	6.84	▼16.59
Turnout		1,77,765	83.93	▲3.08
INC gain from NCP		Swing	-	

=== 2021 ===
There were 2,03,267 registered voters in the constituency for the 2021 election.

2021 Kerala Legislative Assembly election: Elathur
Party	Candidate	Votes	%	±%
NCP	A. K. Saseendran	83,639	50.89	▲2.24
DCK	Sulfikar Mayoori	45,137	27.46	−
BJP	T. P. Jayachandran Master	32,010	19.48	▲0.96
WPOI	Tahir Mokandi	2,000	0.73	−
NOTA	None of the above	986	0.48	−
Independent	P. K. Radhakrishnan	580	0.35	−
Margin of victory		38,502	23.43	▲4.93
Turnout		1,64,350	80.85	▼2.43
LDF hold		Swing	▲2.24	

=== 2016 ===
There were 1,88,528 registered voters in the constituency for the 2016 election.

2016 Kerala Legislative Assembly election: Elathur
Party	Candidate	Votes	%	±%
LDF	A. K. Saseendran	76,387	48.65	▼1.49
JD(U)	Kishen Chand	47,450	30.15	−
BJP	Rajan Nair	29,070	18.52	▲9.63
Independent	Krishnan	1,724	1.10	−
BSP	Raghu	1,142	0.73	
NOTA	None of the above	986	0.63	−
Independent	Useffali P. M.	367	0.23	−
Margin of victory		29,057	18.50	▲7.56
Turnout		1,57,006	83.28	▲1.04
LDF hold		Swing	▼1.49	

=== 2011 ===
There were 1,62,830 registered voters in the constituency for the 2011 election.

2011 Kerala Legislative Assembly election: Elathur
Party	Candidate	Votes	%	±%
LDF	A. K. Saseendran	67,143	50.14	−
SJ(D)	Shaikh P. Harriz	52,489	39.20	−
BJP	V. V. Rajan	11,901	8.89	−
Independent	A. Sasindran	1,402	1.05	−
BSP	Ramesh Nanmanda	971	0.73	−
Margin of victory		14,654	10.94	
Turnout		1,57,006	82.24	
LDF win (new seat)				

== See also ==
- Elathur
- Kozhikode district
- List of constituencies of the Kerala Legislative Assembly
- 2016 Kerala Legislative Assembly election
