= Kozhikode Lok Sabha constituency =

Lok Sabha Constituency in Kerala, India

Coordinates: 11.27°N 75.80°E

Kozhikode KL-5
- Lok Sabha constituency
- Kozhikode Lok Sabha constituency

Constituency details
- Country: India
- Region: South India
- State: Kerala
- Assembly constituencies: Balussery; Elathur; Kozhikode North; Kozhikode South; Beypore; Kunnamangalam; Koduvally
- Established: 1952
- Total electors: 13,15,355 (2019)
- Reservation: None

Member of Parliament
- 18th Lok Sabha
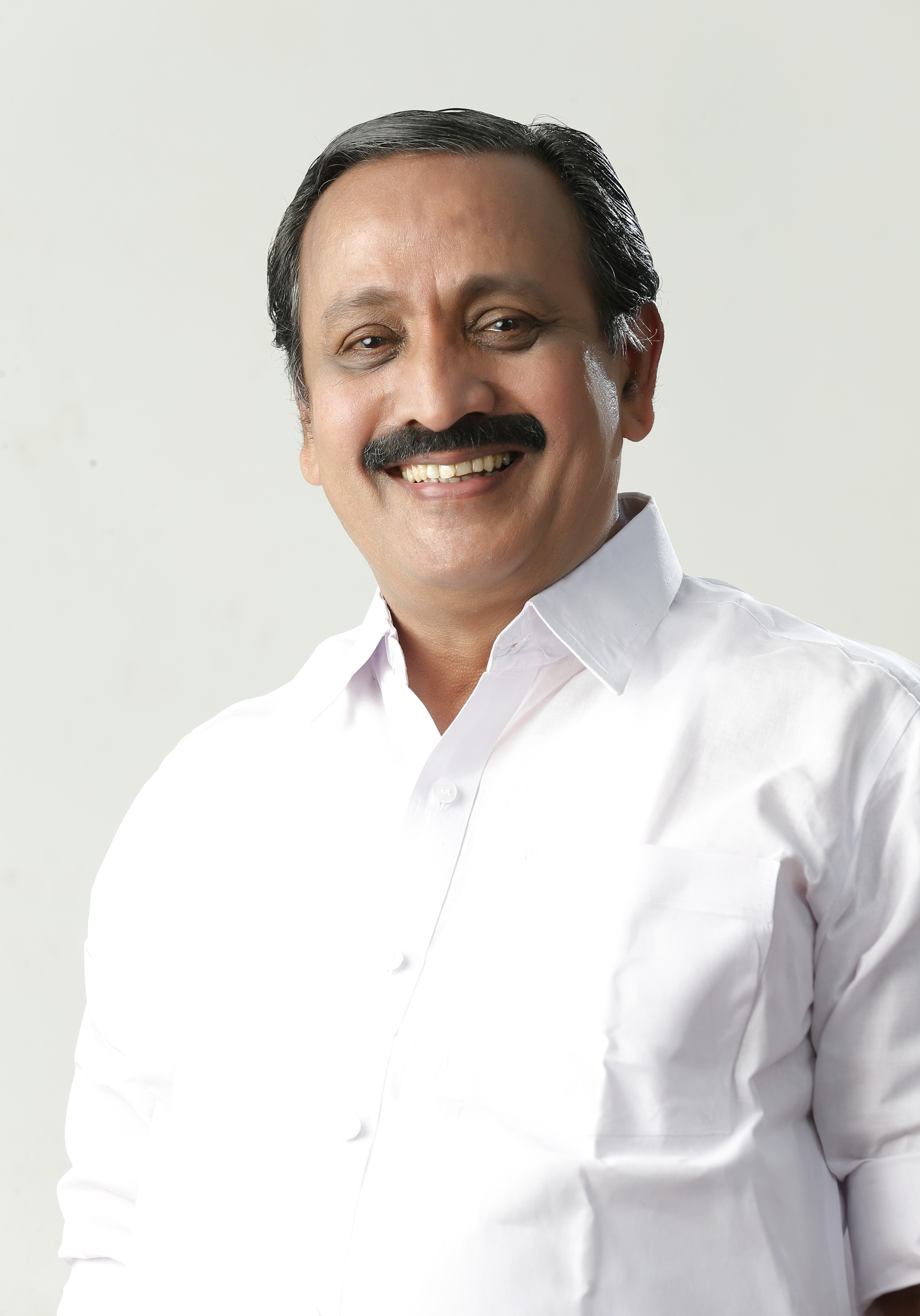
- Incumbent M. K. Raghavan
- Party: INC
- Alliance: UDF
- Elected year: 2024

Kozhikode Lok Sabha constituency is one of the 20 Lok Sabha (parliamentary) constituencies in the Indian state of Kerala.

== Assembly segments ==
Kozhikode Lok Sabha constituency is composed of the following assembly segments:

| No | Name | District | Member | Party | 2024 Lead |
|---|---|---|---|---|---|
| 25 | Balussery (SC) | Kozhikode | V. T. Sooraj | INC | INC |
| 26 | Elathur | Kozhikode | Vidya Balakrishnan | INC | INC |
| 27 | Kozhikode North | Kozhikode | K. Jayanth | INC | INC |
| 28 | Kozhikode South | Kozhikode | Faizal Babu | IUML | INC |
| 29 | Beypore | Kozhikode | P. A. Mohammed Riyas | CPI(M) | INC |
| 30 | Kunnamangalam | Kozhikode | M. A. Razak Master | IUML | INC |
| 31 | Koduvally | Kozhikode | P. K. Firos | IUML | INC |

== Members of Parliament ==
| Year | Member | Party |
|---|---|---|
| 1952 | Achuthan Damodaran Menon | Kisan Mazdoor Praja Party |
| 1957 | K.P. Kutti Krishnan Nair | Indian National Congress |
| 1962 | C.H. Mohammed Koya | Indian Union Muslim League |
| 1967 | Ebrahim Sulaiman Sait | Indian Union Muslim League |
| 1971 | Ebrahim Sulaiman Sait | Indian Union Muslim League |
| 1977 | V.A. Seyid Muhammad | Indian National Congress |
| 1980 | E. K. Imbichi Bava | Communist Party of India (Marxist) |
| 1984 | K. G. Adiyodi | Indian National Congress |
| 1989 | K. Muraleedharan | Indian National Congress |
| 1991 | K. Muraleedharan | Indian National Congress |
| 1996 | M.P. Veerendra Kumar | Janata Dal |
| 1998 | P. Sankaran | Indian National Congress |
| 1999 | K. Muraleedharan | Indian National Congress |
| 2004 | M.P. Veerendra Kumar | Janata Dal (Secular) |
Major boundary changes
| 2009 | M. K. Raghavan | Indian National Congress |
| 2014 | M. K. Raghavan | Indian National Congress |
| 2019 | M. K. Raghavan | Indian National Congress |
| 2024 | M. K. Raghavan | Indian National Congress |

== Election results ==
=== General Elections 2029 ===
2029 Indian general election: Kozhikode
| Party | Candidate | Votes | % | ±% |
|---|---|---|---|---|
| UDF | | | | |
| LDF | | | | |
| NDA | | | | |
| NOTA | None of the above | | | |
| Margin of victory | | | | |
| Turnout | | | | |
| | | Swing | | |

=== General Election 2024 ===
2024 Indian general election: Kozhikode
| Party | Candidate | Votes | % | ±% |
|---|---|---|---|---|
| INC | M. K. Raghavan | 520,421 | 47.74 | ▲1.92 |
| CPI(M) | Elamaram Kareem | 3,74,245 | 34.33 | ▼3.58 |
| BJP | M.T. Ramesh | 1,80,666 | 16.57 | ▲1.60 |
| NOTA | None of the above | 6,316 | 0.58 | ▲0.26 |
| Majority | | 1,46,176 | 13.41 | ▲5.50 |
| Turnout | | 10,92,977 | 76.30 | ▼ |
| INC hold | | Swing | ▲1.92 | |

By Assembly Segments
| No. | Status (Assembly Constituency) | Votes | | | Lead |
| No. | Status (Assembly Constituency) | M. K. Raghavan | Elamaram Kareem | M. T. Ramesh | Lead |
|---|---|---|---|---|---|
| 25 | Balussery (SC) | 84,834 | 67,200 | 22,714 | 17,634 |
| 26 | Elathur | 69,632 | 59,141 | 29,609 | 10,491 |
| 27 | Kozhikode North | 55,197 | 40,266 | 32,481 | 14,931 |
| 28 | Kozhikode South | 55,671 | 34,608 | 25,943 | 21,063 |
| 29 | Beypore | 76,654 | 57,093 | 25,943 | 19,561 |
| 30 | Kunnamangalam | 88,054 | 64,752 | 32,860 | 23,302 |
| 36 | Koduvally | 84,772 | 46,128 | 12,830 | 38,644 |

=== General election 2019 ===
2019 Indian general election: Kozhikode
| Party | Candidate | Votes | % | ±% |
|---|---|---|---|---|
| INC | M. K. Raghavan | 493,444 | 45.82 | ▲3.67 |
| CPI(M) | A. Pradeepkumar | 4,08,219 | 37.91 | ▼2.45 |
| BJP | K. P. Prakash Babu | 1,61,216 | 14.97 | ▲2.7 |
| BSP | Raghu K | 2,299 | 0.21 | |
| Independent | Raghavan. P Vadakke Edoli | 1,160 | 0.11 | |
| Independent | Raghavan. T Thayyullayil | 1,077 | 0.1 | |
| SUCI(C) | A. Sekhar | 1,031 | 0.1 | |
| Independent | Raghavan Nair Manikkothu Kunnummal | 962 | 0.09 | |
| Independent | PradeepKumar. E. T Peedikathodi Veedu | 769 | 0.07 | |
| Independent | Prakash Babu Chaithram | 571 | 0.05 | |
| Independent | Nusrath Jahan | 558 | 0.05 | |
| Independent | Raghavn. N Allachiparambu | 462 | 0.04 | |
| Independent | Pradeep. V. K | 410 | 0.04 | |
| NOTA | None of the above | 3,473 | 0.32 | |
| Margin of victory | | 85,225 | 7.91 | |
| Turnout | | 10,76,882 | 81.70 | |
| Registered electors | | 13,18,024 | | ▲11.46 % |
| INC hold | | Swing | | |

By Assembly Segments
| No. | Status (Assembly Constituency) | Votes | | | Lead |
| No. | Status (Assembly Constituency) | M. K. Raghavan | A. Pradeepkumar | K. P. Prakash Babu | Lead |
|---|---|---|---|---|---|
| 25 | Balussery (SC) | 83,059 | 73,314 | 18,836 | 9,745 |
| 26 | Elathur | 67,280 | 67,177 | 24,649 | 103 |
| 27 | Kozhikode North | 54,246 | 49,688 | 28,665 | 4,558 |
| 28 | Kozhikode South | 54,608 | 40,877 | 20,173 | 13,731 |
| 29 | Beypore | 69,402 | 58,979 | 25,697 | 10,423 |
| 30 | Kunnamangalam | 81,551 | 70,259 | 30,659 | 11,292 |
| 36 | Koduvally | 81,689 | 45,781 | 11,682 | 35,908 |

=== General election 2014 ===
2014 Indian general election: Kozhikode
| Party | Candidate | Votes | % | ±% |
|---|---|---|---|---|
| INC | M. K. Raghavan | 3,97,615 | 42.15 | −0.77 |
| CPI(M) | A. Vijayaraghavan | 3,80,732 | 40.36 | −2.48 |
| BJP | C.K Padmanabhan | 1,15,760 | 12.27 | +1.04 |
| AAP | K.P. Ratheesh | 13,934 | 1.48 | |
| SDPI | Musthafa Kommeri | 10,596 | 1.12 | |
| Independent | Adv. N. P. Prathap Kumar | 6,993 | 0.74 | |
| Independent | M. Vijayaraghavan | 2,665 | 0.28 | |
| Independent | M. Raghavan | 2,331 | 0.25 | |
| Independent | Vijayaraghavan. K | 1,991 | 0.21 | |
| BSP | Velayudhan K. P | 1,909 | 0.20 | |
| Independent | V. M. Raghavan | 964 | 0.10 | |
| Independent | Thrissur Nazeer | 665 | 0.07 | |
| Independent | Muhammed Riyas | 473 | 0.05 | |
| NOTA | None of the Above | 6,381 | 0.68 | |
| Margin of victory | | 16,883 | 1.79 | +1.68 |
| Turnout | | 9,43,009 | 79.79 | |
| Registered electors | | 11,82,484 | | % |
| INC hold | | Swing | | |

By Assembly Segments
| No. | Status (Assembly Constituency) | Votes | | | Lead |
| No. | Status (Assembly Constituency) | M. K. Raghavan | A. Vijayaraghavan | C. K. Padmanabhan | Lead |
|---|---|---|---|---|---|
| 25 | Balussery (SC) | 69,414 | 68,747 | 15,332 | 667 |
| 26 | Elathur | 57,792 | 63,241 | 17,392 | 5,449 |
| 27 | Kozhikode North | 47,899 | 46,380 | 19,918 | 1,519 |
| 28 | Kozhikode South | 45,128 | 39,912 | 14,155 | 5,216 |
| 29 | Beypore | 53,128 | 54,928 | 18,031 | 1,768 |
| 30 | Kunnamangalam | 64,364 | 64,584 | 21,726 | 220 |
| 36 | Koduvally | 58,494 | 41,895 | 9,041 | 16,599 |

=== General election 2009 ===
After the 2008 delimitation Kalpetta,Sulthan Bathery,Thiruvambady was removed and added to Wayanad

2009 Indian general elections: Kozhikode
| Party | Candidate | Votes | % | ±% |
|---|---|---|---|---|
| INC | M. K. Raghavan | 3,42,309 | 42.92 | |
| CPI(M) | Adv. P. A. Mohammed Riyas | 3,41,471 | 42.81 | |
| BJP | V. Muraleedharan | 89718 | 11.25 | |
| Independent | ADV. P. Kumarankutty | 5,871 | 0.74 | |
| BSP | A.K. Abdul Nasar | 4,044 | 0.51 | |
| Independent | Dr. D. Surendranath | 7,162 | 0.28 | |
| Independent | K. Raghavan | 1,740 | 0.22 | |
| Independent | Riyas | 1,728 | 0.22 | |
| Independent | Vinod K. | 1,629 | 0.20 | |
| Independent | ADV. Sabi Joseph | 1,163 | 0.15 | |
| Independent | P.A. Mohammed Riyas | 1,109 | 0.14 | |
| Independent | M. Raghavan | 1,033 | 0.13 | |
| Independent | K. Muhammed Riyas | 1,026 | 0.13 | |
| Independent | P. Ramachandran Nair | 1,005 | 0.13 | |
| Independent | P. Muhammed Riyas | 980 | 0.12 | |
| Independent | Mudoor Muhammed Haji | 495 | 0.06 | |
| Margin of victory | | 838 | 0.11 | |
| Turnout | | 7,97,578 | 75.68 | |
| Registered electors | | 10,53,817 | | % |
| INC gain from JD(S) | | Swing | | |

=== General election 2004 ===
2004 Indian general elections: Kozhikode
| Party | Candidate | Votes | % | ±% |
|---|---|---|---|---|
| JD(S) | M. P. Veerendra Kumar | 340,111 | 43.54 | +3.04 |
| INC | V. Balaram | 274,785 | 35.18 | −11.45 |
| BJP | M.T.Ramesh | 97,889 | 12.53 | +2.33 |
| Independent | A.C Varkey | 34,005 | | |
| Independent | K. Veerendra Kumar | 7,162 | | |
| Independent | Dr. D. Surendranath | 6,306 | | |
| Independent | K. Arunkumar | 4,490 | | |
| BSP | P. Bharathan | 4,014 | | |
| Independent | K. Balaram | 3,173 | | |
| Independent | Babu Karimpady | 2,539 | | |
| Independent | T. K. Chandramathi | 2,302 | | |
| Independent | M. P. Shanthivarma Jain | 2,223 | | |
| Independent | A. V. K. Moosad | 2,185 | | |
| Margin of victory | | 65,326 | 8.36 | +2.23 |
| Turnout | | 781,146 | 70.41 | −2.88 |
| Registered electors | | | | % |
| JD(S) gain from INC | | Swing | | |

=== General Election 1999 ===
1999 Indian general election: Calicut
| Party | Candidate | Votes | % | ±% |
|---|---|---|---|---|
| INC | K. Muraleedharan | 3,83,425 | 46.63 | |
| JD(S) | C. M. Ibrahim | 3,33,023 | 40.50 | |
| BJP | P.C Mohanan Master | 83,862 | 10.20 | |
| Independent | C.P. Ibrahim | 10,401 | 1.26 | |
| Independent | K.T Kunhikannan | 10,275 | 1.25 | |
| Independent | M.P Santhivarma Jain | 883 | 0.11 | |
| Independent | K. Harsha | 438 | 0.05 | |
| Majority | | 50,402 | 6.13 | |
| Turnout | | 8,26,901 | 73.53 | |
| Registered electors | | 11,24,640 | | % |
| INC hold | | Swing | | |

== See also ==
- 2024 Indian general election in Kerala
- Kozhikode
- List of constituencies of the Lok Sabha
