= Thuruthyad =

Village in Kerala, India

Thuruthyad is a small village in Balussery panchayath, Kozhikode district. It is about 6 km away from Balussery town. Thuruthyad ALP school was the first school here. It was founded before India's independence. A special school for intellectually disabled people is working here.

== See also ==
- Balussery
- Kozhikode district
- Kozhikode
