= Beypore Assembly constituency =

Constituency of the Kerala legislative assembly in India

Coordinates: 11.17°N 75.80°E

Beypore
- Constituency No. 29 for the Kerala Legislative Assembly
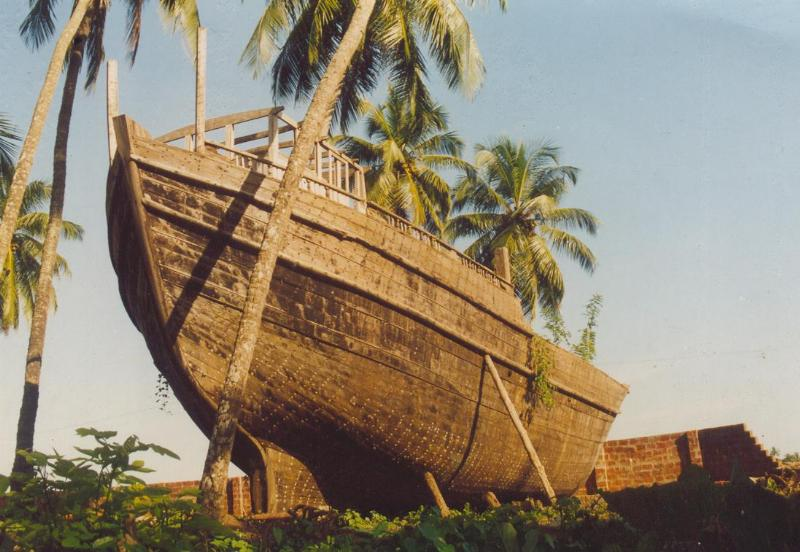
- Uru, a large Dhow-type wooden ship made by Carpenters in Beypore

Constituency details
- Country: India
- Region: South India
- State: Kerala
- District: Kozhikode
- Established: 1965
- Total electors: 2,08,059 (2021)
- Reservation: None

Member of Legislative Assembly
- 16th Kerala Legislative Assembly
- Incumbent P. A. Mohammed Riyas
- Party: CPI(M)
- Alliance: LDF
- Elected year: 2026

Beypore State assembly constituency is one of the 140 state legislative assembly constituencies in Kerala in southern India. It is also one of the seven state legislative assembly constituencies included in Kozhikode Lok Sabha constituency. As of the 2026 Assembly election, the current MLA is P. A. Mohammed Riyas of CPI(M).

== Local self-governed segments ==
Beypore Assembly constituency is composed of the following 14 wards of the Kozhikode Municipal Corporation (Beypore zone and Cheruvannur Nallalam zone) in Kozhikode Taluk, and two Municipalities and one Gram Panchayat in the same Taluk:

Wards of Kozhikode Municipal Corporation
Ward no.	Name
40	Areekad North
41	Areekad
42	Nallalam
43	Kolathara
44	Kundayithodu
45	Cheruvannur East
46	Cheruvannur West
47	Beypore Port
48	Beypore
49	Marad
50	Naduvattam
51	Punjappadam
52	Arakkinar
53	Mathottam

Other local bodies
Name	Local body type	Taluk
Feroke	Municipality	Kozhikode
Ramanattukara	Municipality	Kozhikode
Kadalundi	Grama panchayat	Kozhikode

== Members of Legislative Assembly ==
The following list contains all members of Kerala Legislative Assembly who have represented the constituency:

Year	Member	Political party
1967	K. Chathunni	Communist Party of India (Marxist)
1970	K. Chathunni	Communist Party of India (Marxist)
1977	N. P. Moideen	Indian National Congress
1980	N. P. Moideen	Indian National Congress (U)
1982	K. Moosakutty	Communist Party of India (Marxist)
1987	T. K. Hamza	Communist Party of India (Marxist)
1991	T. K. Hamza	Communist Party of India (Marxist)
1996	T. K. Hamza	Communist Party of India (Marxist)
2001	V. K. C. Mammed Koya	Communist Party of India (Marxist)
2006	Elamaram Kareem	Communist Party of India (Marxist)
2011	Elamaram Kareem	Communist Party of India (Marxist)
2016	V. K. C. Mammed Koya	Communist Party of India (Marxist)
2021	P. A. Mohammed Riyas	Communist Party of India (Marxist)
2026	P. A. Mohammed Riyas	Communist Party of India (Marxist)

== Election results ==
Percentage change (±) denotes the change in the number of votes from the immediate previous election.

=== 2026 ===
2026 Kerala Legislative Assembly election: Beypore
Party	Candidate	Votes	%	±%
CPI(M)	P. A. Mohammed Riyas	81,849	44.21	▼5.52
UDF	P. V. Anvar	74,362	40.16	▲7.83
BJP	Adv. K. P. Prakash Babu	26,543	14.34	▼1.56
NOTA	None of the above	583		
Margin of victory		7,487	4.05	
Turnout		1,85,150		
CPI(M) hold		Swing		

=== 2021 ===
There were 2,08,059 registered voters in the constituency for the 2021 election.

2021 Kerala Legislative Assembly election: Beypore
Party	Candidate	Votes	%	±%
CPI(M)	P. A. Mohammed Riyas	82,165	49.73	▲5.34
INC	PM Niyas	53,418	32.33	▼2.83
BJP	K. P. Prakash Babu	26,267	15.90	▼2.06
SDPI	Jamal Chaliyam	2,029	1.23	▲0.53
NOTA	None of the above	621	0.38	
Margin of victory		28,747	17.40	▲8.17
Turnout		1,65,210	79.40	▼2.06
CPI(M) hold		Swing	▲5.34	

=== 2016 ===
There were 1,91,152 registered voters in the constituency for the 2016 election.

2016 Kerala Legislative Assembly election: Beypore
Party	Candidate	Votes	%	±%
CPI(M)	V. K. C. Mammed Koya	69,114	44.39	▼2.41
INC	Adam Mulsi M. P.	51751	35.16	▼7.53
BJP	K. P. Prakash Babu	27,958	17.96	▲9.43
WPOI	P. C. Muhammedkutty	1,387	0.89	−
SDPI	Muhammed Musthafa P. P.	1,126	0.72	▼0.02
NOTA	None of the above	605	0.39	
Margin of victory		14,363	9.23	▲5.12
Turnout		1,55,709	81.46	▲2.59
CPI(M) hold		Swing	▼2.41	

=== 2011 ===
There were 1,64,045 registered voters in the constituency for the 2011 election.

2011 Kerala Legislative Assembly election: Beypore
Party	Candidate	Votes	%	±%
CPI(M)	Elamaram Kareem	60,550	46.80	
INC	Adam Mulsi M. P.	55,234	42.69	
BJP	K. P. Sreesan	11,040	8.53	
SDPI	Muhammed Musthafa	954	0.74	
Independent	K. S. Hariharan	564	0.44	
BSP	K. T. Latha	469	0.36	
Independent	Adam Malique E.	396	0.31	−
Independent	Abdul Kareem	183	0.14	−
Margin of victory		5,316	4.11	
Turnout		1,29,390	78.87	
CPI(M) hold		Swing		

== See also ==
- Beypore
- Kozhikode district
- List of constituencies of the Kerala Legislative Assembly
- 2016 Kerala Legislative Assembly election
