= We Park =

Park in Kollam, India

Coordinates: 8.8811°N 76.5983°E

We Park is an urban recreational park situated at SN College Junction in Kollam, Kerala, India. It holds the distinction of being Kerala's first-ever under-flyover park, constructed beneath a railway overbridge. Opened on March 1, 2025, the park serves as the flagship pilot project of the Kerala Government's comprehensive State Design Policy, which aims to convert unused or abandoned public land into sustainable and visually appealing community spaces.

The park was conceptualized under the 2023 Kerala State Design Policy to transform neglected "under-bridge" environments into vibrant green lungs for urban areas. It was developed by Kerala Tourism Infrastructure Limited (KTIL) on a 70-cent plot of land owned by the Public Works Department (PWD). Built at an estimated cost of ₹2 crore, the site features extensively painted murals on its concrete columns, created by student members of the local Sree Narayana College Tourism Club. The park was officially inaugurated by P. A. Mohamed Riyas, the Minister for Tourism and Co-operation.

Following its opening, the park's daily operations and long-term maintenance are managed through a joint partnership between the Kollam Municipal Corporation and the District Tourism Promotion Council (DTPC). The park has a shuttle court, volleyball court, skating area, chess block, garden, seating arrangements, open gym, parking facility, basic amenities and kiosks.
