= Paimpalasseri =

- town
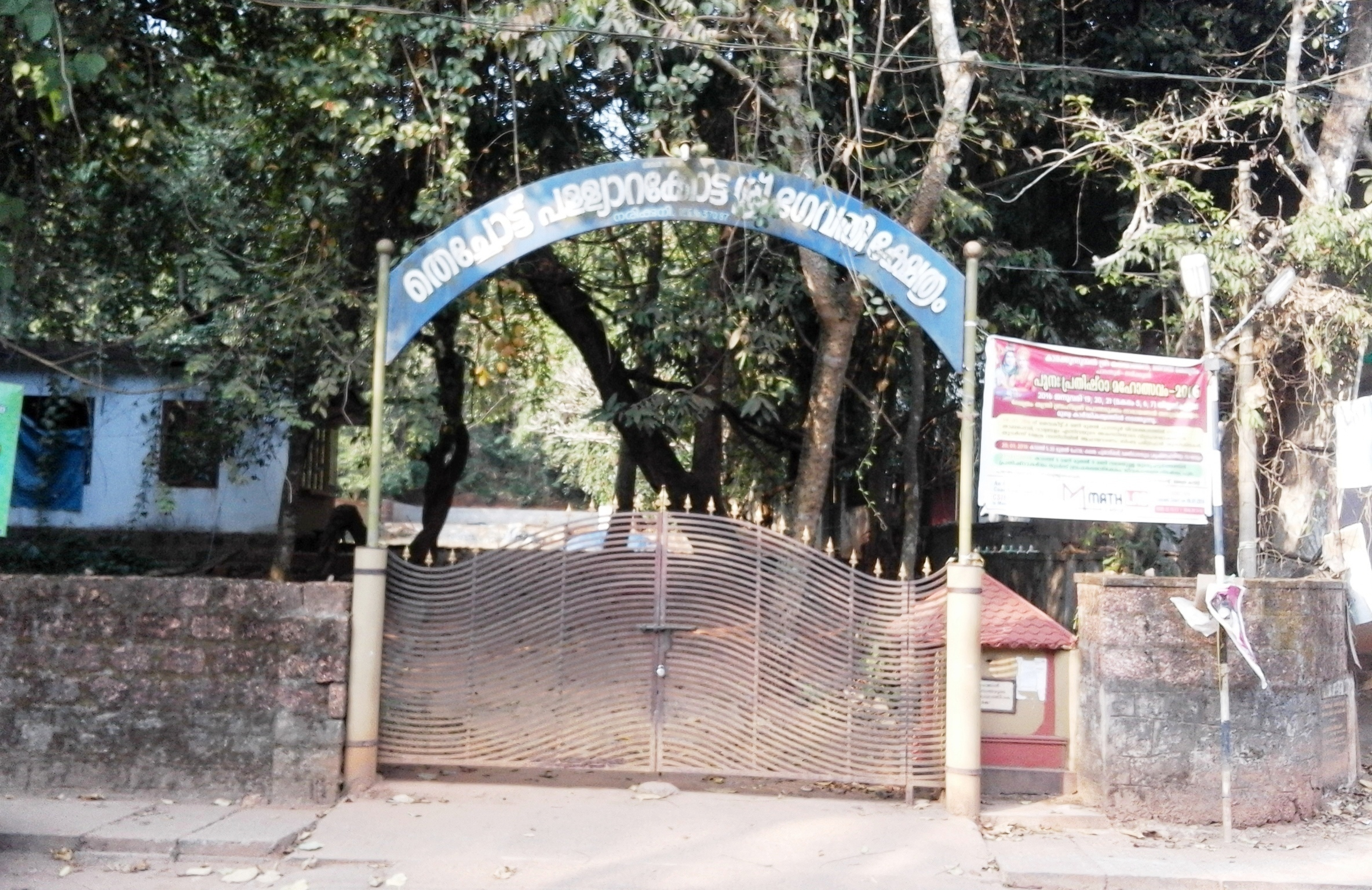
- Narikkuni Fort
- Time zone: UTC+5:30 (IST)
- PIN: 673571
- Nearest city: Kozhikode
- Lok Sabha constituency: Kozhikode
- Vidhan Sabha constituency: Koduvally

Paimpalasseri is a small town in Kozhikode district in the Indian state of Kerala.

It is situated on Kunnamangalam-Nanminda Road or Kappad-Thusharagiri-Adivaram Road and is about 20 km away from Kozhikode city. There are two roads starting from Paimpalasseri, the Paimpalasseri-Madavoor mukku road and the Paimpalasseri-Pullaloor road. Important educational institutions in Paimpalassery are Madavoor Upper primary school and Paimpalasseri government lower primary school. Sri Mahavishnu temple located in Paimpalasseri is one of the temples in Kozhikode district.
