= Usha School of Athletics =

Private sports school in Kozhikode, Kerala, India

- ഉഷ സ്കൂൾ ഓഫ് അത്ലറ്റിക്സ്
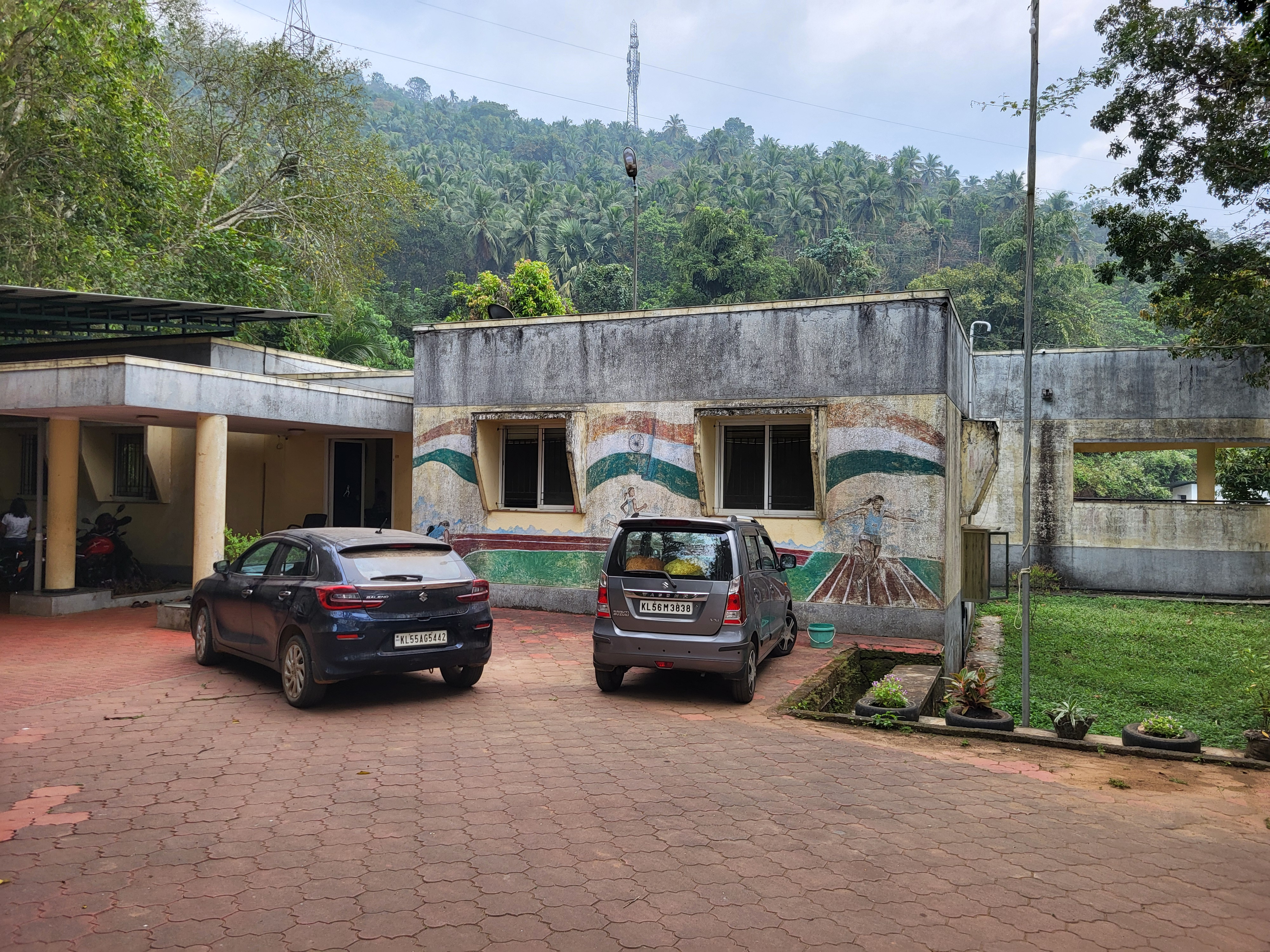

Location
- Kinalur, Balussery; Koyilandy, Kerala 673612; India
- Coordinates: 11°28′31″N 75°52′17″E

Information
- Type: Sports school
- Motto: The sprint of a great nation
- Established: 2002 (24 years ago)
- Founder: P. T. Usha
- Authority: Board of Trustees
- Gender: Female
- Campus type: Suburban
- Accreditation: Kerala State Sports Council
- Website: www.ptusha.org/index.php

Usha School of Athletics is a private athletic training institute located in Kinalur, Kozhikode, Kerala, focused on developing young female athletes, particularly in track and field events. Founded in 2002 by former Indian sprinter P. T. Usha.

== History ==
Usha School of Athletics was inaugurated on 29 May 2002, initially operating from temporary premises in Koyilandy, with training conducted on a local sports ground and at Payyoli beach for running. The local Rotary Club helped set up the school's gym. After screening 40 children, 12 were selected for the training camp. Within a year, some of these students started competing at the national level. One of the first batch members, Tintu Luka, won a silver medal at the Asian Junior Championships in 2005.

In 2006, the Government of Kerala allocated over 30 acres of land in Kinalur for the school to build permanent facilities, providing it on a long-term lease. NRI businessman P. N. C. Menon contributed to the construction of the school's office and hostel complex, with additional support from Mohandas Pai, Kumari Shibulal, and Sudha Murty. The school shifted to its current location in April 2008. Over the following years, a synthetic track was added, and construction began on a new building for facilities, including a gym. By the next year, a recovery pool was planned. As of now, only about one-third of the 30-acre land has been developed. The remaining land is reserved for future development. The school trains athletes in various track events, from 100 meters to 3000 meters steeplechase, and the hostel can accommodate up to 40 students.

On June 15, 2017, the synthetic track at Usha School of Athletics was inaugurated by Prime Minister Narendra Modi in Kinalur, Kozhikode.

== Notable alumni ==
Notable alumni include:

- Jisna Mathew (class of 2011) – Olympian, Three-time gold medalist at the Asian Junior Championships and one gold medal at the Asian Championship.
- Tintu Luka (class of 2002) – Olympian, Multiple Asian Games Medalist, Multiple Asian Championship medalist, National Record Holder for 800m, recipient of the Arjuna Award in 2014.
