= Balussery Assembly constituency =

Constituency of the Kerala legislative assembly in India

Coordinates: 11.44°N 75.82°E

Balussery Assembly Constituency
- Constituency No. 24 for the Kerala Legislative Assembly
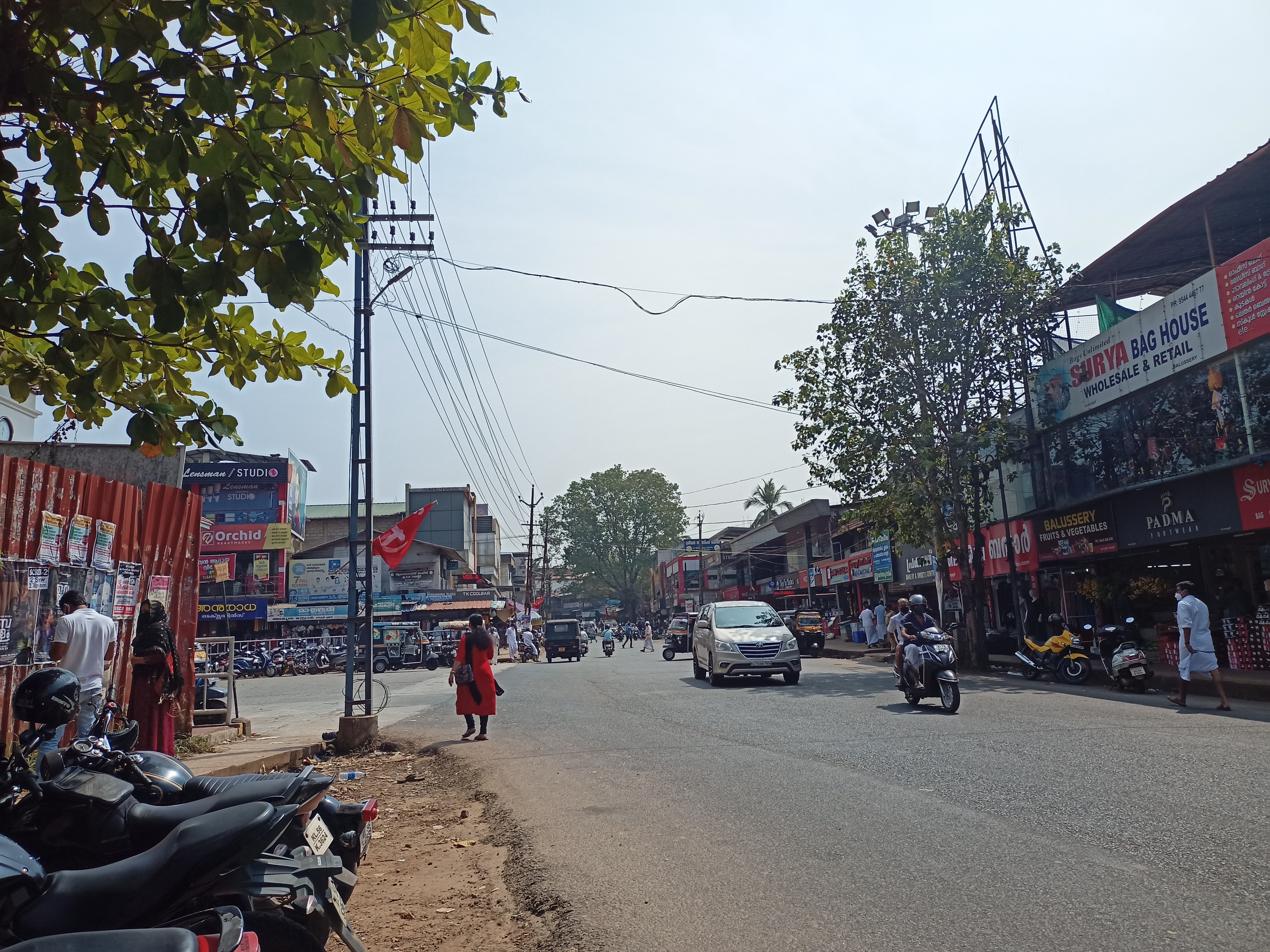
- Balussery Town

Constituency details
- Country: India
- Region: South India
- State: Kerala
- District: Kozhikode
- Established: 1957
- Reservation: SC

Member of Legislative Assembly
- 16th Kerala Legislative Assembly
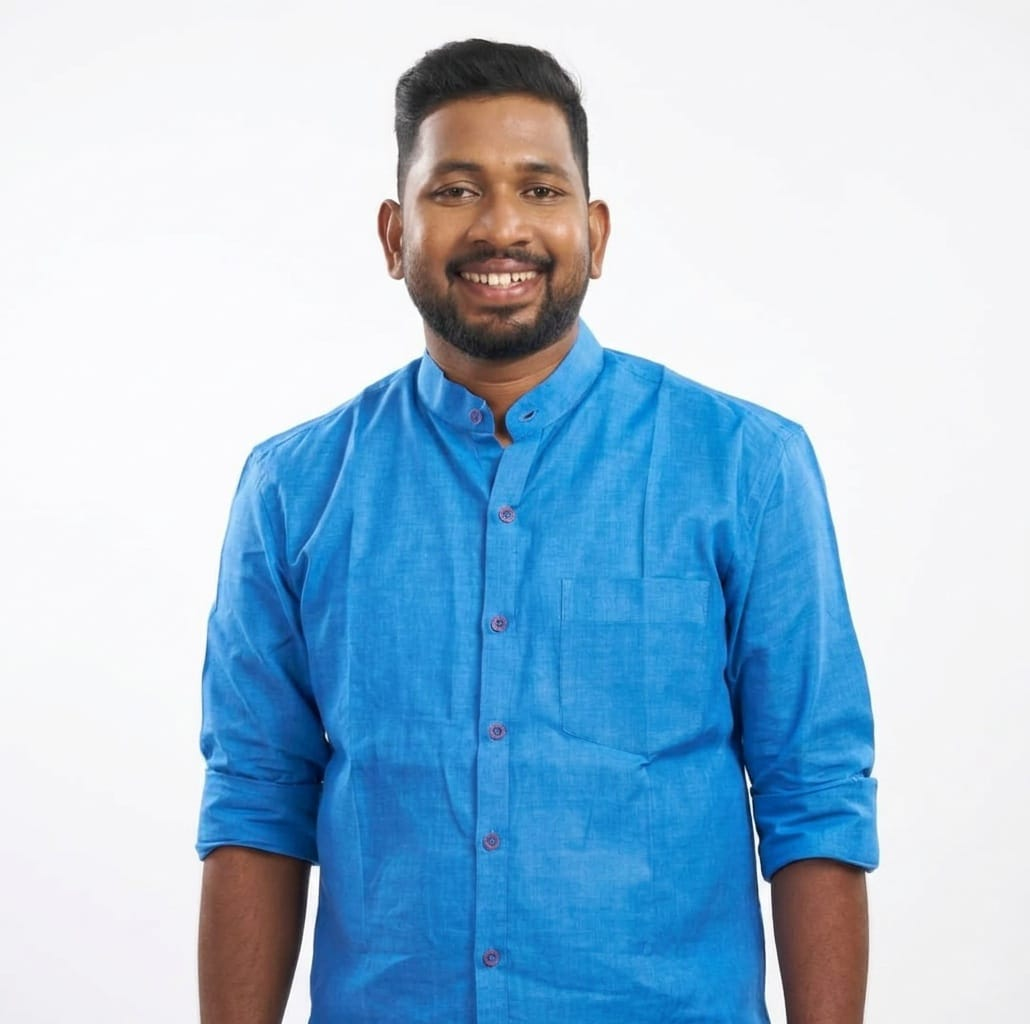
- Incumbent V. T. Sooraj
- Party: INC
- Alliance: UDF
- Elected year: 2026

Balussery is one of the largest of the 140 state legislative assembly constituencies in Kerala in southern India. It is also one of the seven state legislative assembly constituencies included in Kozhikode Lok Sabha constituency. Since the April 2026 assembly elections, V. T. Sooraj of the Indian National Congress has been the MLA from Balussery.

== Local self-governed segments ==
Balussery Assembly constituency is composed of the following local self-governed segments:

Name	Status (Grama panchayat/Municipality)	Taluk
Atholi	Grama panchayat	Koyilandy
Balussery	Grama panchayat	Koyilandy
Kayanna	Grama panchayat	Koyilandy
Koorachundu	Grama panchayat	Koyilandy
Kottur	Grama panchayat	Koyilandy
Naduvannur	Grama panchayat	Koyilandy
Ulliyeri	Grama panchayat	Koyilandy
Panangad	Grama panchayat	Thamarassery
Unnikulam	Grama panchayat	Thamarassery

== Members of the Legislative Assembly ==
The following list contains all members of Kerala Legislative Assembly who have represented the constituency:

Year	Name	Political party
1957	M. Narayana Kurup	Praja Socialist Party
1960	M. Narayana Kurup	Praja Socialist Party
1967	A. K. Appu	Samyukta Socialist Party
1970	A. C. Shanmughadas	Indian National Congress
1977	P. K. Sankarankutty	Bharatiya Lok Dal
1980	A. C. Shanmughadas	Indian National Congress (U)
1982	A. C. Shanmughadas	Indian Congress (Socialist)
1987	A. C. Shanmughadas	Indian Congress (Socialist) – Sarat Chandra Sinha
1991	A. C. Shanmughadas	Indian Congress (Socialist) – Sarat Chandra Sinha
1996	A. C. Shanmughadas	Indian Congress (Socialist)
2001	A. C. Shanmughadas	Nationalist Congress Party
2006	A. K. Saseendran	Nationalist Congress Party
2011	Purushan Kadalundy	Communist Party of India (Marxist)
2016	Purushan Kadalundy	Communist Party of India (Marxist)
2021	K. M. Sachin Dev	Communist Party of India (Marxist)
2026	V. T. Sooraj	Indian National Congress

== Election results ==
=== 2026 ===
2026 Kerala Legislative Assembly election: Balussery
Party	Candidate	Votes	%	±%
INC	V. T. Sooraj	94,804	49.55	▲11.01
CPI(M)	K. M. Sachin Dev	77,824	40.68	▼9.71
BJP	C. P. Satheeshan	17,669	9.24	▲0.20
NOTA	None of the above	516	0.27	
Independent	Sooraj K.	272	0.14	
Independent	Abhijith	230	0.12	
Margin of victory		16,980		
Turnout		191,315		
INC gain from CPI(M)		Swing		

=== 2021 ===
There were 2,24,239 registered voters in the constituency for the 2021 election.

2021 Kerala Legislative Assembly election: Balussery
Party	Candidate	Votes	%	±%
CPI(M)	K. M. Sachin Dev	91,839	50.39	▲2.89
INC	Dharmajan Bolgatty	71,467	38.54	−
BJP	Libin Balussery	16,490	9.04	▼2.03
WPOI	Chandrika	889	0.48	▼0.11
BSP	Jobish Balussery	476	0.26	▼0.12
Independent	Dharmendran	247	0.13	−
RPI	Mohandas	115	0.06	−
Margin of victory		20,372	TBD	TBD
Turnout		182,253	81.27	
CPI(M) hold		Swing	TBD	

=== 2016 ===
There were 2,09,667 registered voters in the constituency for the 2016 election.

2016 Kerala Legislative Assembly election: Balusseri
Party	Candidate	Votes	%	±%
CPI(M)	Purushan Kadalundy	82,914	47.50	▼1.68
IUML	U. C. Raman Padanilam	67,450	38.64	−
BJP	P. K. Supran	19,324	11.07	▲4.91
SDPI	Balan Nadavannur	1,764	1.01	▼0.08
WPOI	Saseendran Bappankad	959	0.59	−
Independent	Raman Thachampoyil Meethal	710	0.41	−
NOTA	None of the above	638	0.37	−
Independent	K. T. Sivan	497	0.28	−
Independent	Jayarajan	312	0.18	−
Margin of victory		15,464	8.86	▲2.97
Turnout		1,74,568	83.26	▲1.68
CPI(M) hold		Swing	▼1.68	

=== 2011 ===
There were 1,85,109 registered voters in the constituency for the 2011 election.

2011 Kerala Legislative Assembly election: Balusseri
Party	Candidate	Votes	%	±%
CPI(M)	Purushan Kadalundi	74,259	49.18	
INC	A. Balaram	65,377	43.29	
BJP	T. K. Raman	9,304	6.16	
SDPI	Bhadran M. P.	1,404	0.93	
BSP	K. K. Satheesh	660	0.14	
Margin of victory		9,882	5.89	
Turnout		1,51,004	81.58	
CPI(M) gain from NCP		Swing		

== See also ==
- Balussery
- Kozhikode district
- List of constituencies of the Kerala Legislative Assembly
- 2016 Kerala Legislative Assembly election
