= V. T. Sooraj =

Indian politician

V.T.Sooraj
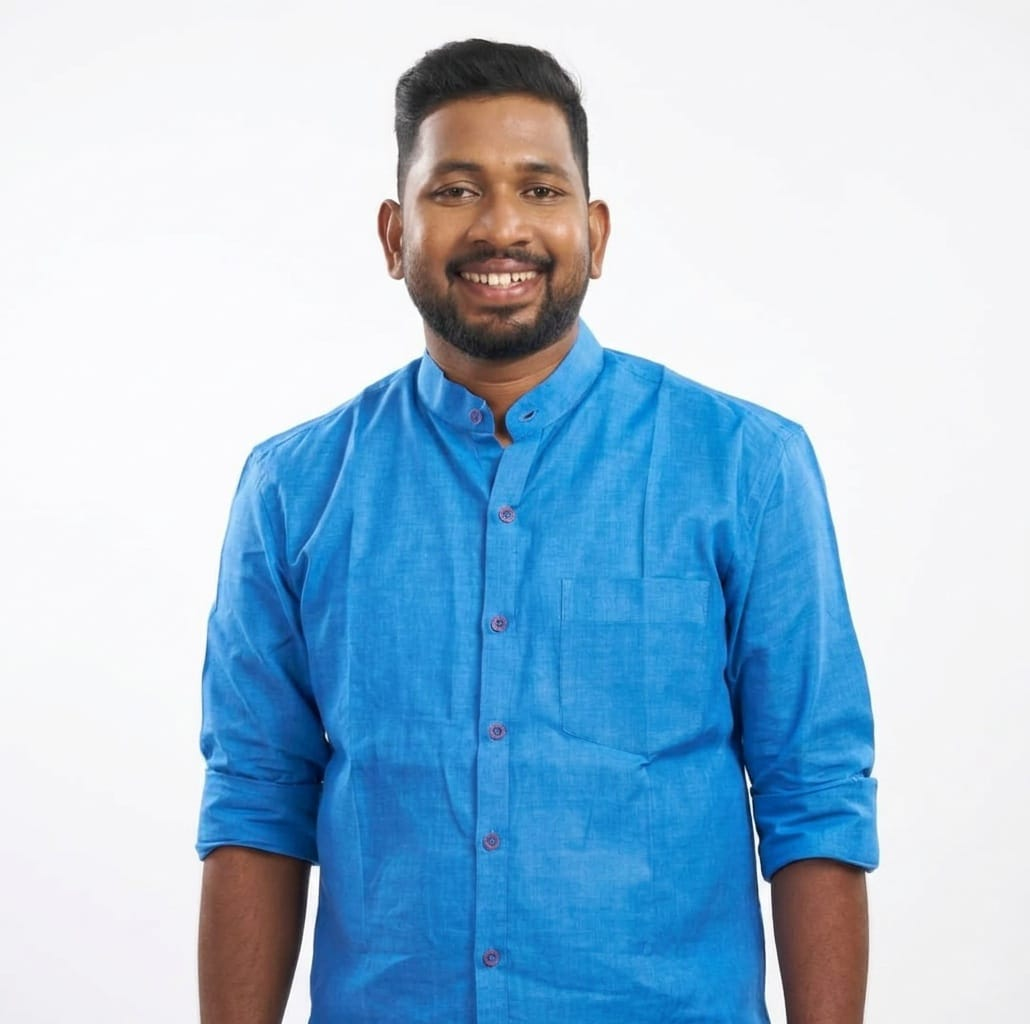
- V.T.Sooraj during parliament election campaign 2026

Member of the Kerala Legislative Assembly
- Incumbent
- Assumed office 4 May 2026
- Preceded by: K. M. Sachin Dev
- Constituency: Balussery

Personal details
- Party: Indian National Congress
- Education: SN College, Chelannur, Kozhikode

V. T. Sooraj is an Indian politician from Kerala. He is a Member of the Legislative Assembly from Balussery Assembly constituency representing the Indian National Congress.

== Personal life ==
V. T. Sooraj was born into a financially modest family in Eravattur in Kozhikode district, Kerala. His father, Narayanan, worked as a daily wage labourer engaged in roofing and agricultural work, while his mother, Pushpa, worked as a collection agent in a local cooperative society. He has a sibling named V. T. Sayooj.

Sooraj studied at S. N. College, Chelannur, Kozhikode. Before entering electoral politics, he was active in student politics through the Kerala Students Union (KSU) and later served as the Kozhikode district president of the organisation. He became known locally for participating in student protests and political agitations in the district.

== Election Results ==
=== 2026 Kerala Legislative Assembly election ===
#	Political Party	Candidate Name	Total Votes	Vote %
	INC	V.T.Sooraj	94804	49.55
	CPI(M)	KM Sachindev	77824	40.68
	NDA	C.P.Satheesh	17669	9.24
	IND	Abhijith	230	0.12
	IND	Sooraj K S/O Asokan	272	0.14
	NOTA	NOTA	516	0.27
Lead		16980 Votes		
Total votes		191315		
