= T. K. Hamza =

Indian politician

Member of Parliament, Lok Sabha
- In office 2004–2009
- Preceded by: E. Ahammed
- Succeeded by: E. Ahammed (As Malappuram)
- Constituency: Manjeri

Member of Kerala Legislative Assembly for Beypore
- In office 1987–2001
- Preceded by: K. Moosakutty
- Succeeded by: V. K. C. Mammed Koya

Personal details
- Born: 14 July 1937 (age 89) Wandoor, Kerala
- Party: Communist Party of India (Marxist)
- Spouse: Mymoona K.
- Children: Najib, Rafiq, Shabir, Nadeera and Sara
- Website: http://tkhamza.com/
- As of 23 September, 2006

T. K. Hamza (born 14 July 1937) is an Indian politician. He was born in Koorad of Wandoor Panchayat. He completed a BA at University of Delhi and BL at Government Law College, Ernakulam. He joined the Manjeri Bar in 1968. He was the Minister for Public Works of the 8th Kerala Legislative Assembly, from 1987 to 1991. He was a member of the 14th Lok Sabha, representing the Manjeri constituency of Kerala and is a member of the Communist Party of India (Marxist) (CPI(M)) political party. He is presently the Chairman of Wakf Board, Kerala. He began his career as a member of Indian National Congress but later moved to CPM.

== Positions Held and details ==
Minister for Works, Wakf, Haj and Inland Navigation from 02-04-1987 to 17-06-1991.

Member, Lok Sabha (2004-2009).

Chairman, Committee on Public Accounts (1991–93), Committee of Privileges (1996–98), & (1998-01).

Government Chief Whip (1996-01); General Secretary, District Youth Congress, Kozhikode; President, DCC, Malappuram; Joined INC in 1957 and served in Youth Congress and INTUC; Joined CPI (M) in 1984; District Committee Member, CPI (M).
