= P. A. Mohammed Riyas =

Indian politician (born 1975)

Minister, Government of Kerala
- In office 20 May 2021 - 17 May 2026
- Governor: Arif Mohammad Khan
- Chief Minister: Pinarayi Vijayan
- Departments: Tourism; Public Works Department; Youth Affairs
- Preceded by: G. Sudhakaran (Minister for Public Works); Kadakampally Surendran (Minister for Tourism)
- Succeeded by: P. K. Basheer (Public Works); P. C. Vishnunath (Minister for Tourism)

Member of the Kerala Legislative Assembly
- Incumbent
- Assumed office 3 May 2021
- Preceded by: V. K. C. Mammed Koya
- Constituency: Beypore

All India President of Democratic Youth Federation of India
- In office 2017–2022
- Preceded by: M. B. Rajesh
- Succeeded by: A. A. Rahim

Minister Of Youth Affairs, Government of Kerala
- In office 06 July 2022 - 04 January 2023
- Preceded by: Saji Cherian
- Succeeded by: Saji Cherian

Personal details
- Born: 18 May 1976 (age 50) Beypore, Kozhikode
- Party: Communist Party of India (Marxist)
- Spouse(s): Sameeha Saithalavi (m. 2002; div. 2015) Veena Vijayan (m. 2020)
- Relatives: Pinarayi Vijayan (father-in-law)
- Education: Farook College, Kozhikode; Government Law College, Kozhikode

P. A. Mohammed Riyas is an Indian politician previously served as the Minister for Tourism, Public Works and Youth Affairs, Government of Kerala. He is the Kerala state committee member of the left CPI(M), and a former All India President of the DYFI.

== Early life, family and education ==
Riyas was born in Kozhikode. His father P. M. Abdul Khader, was a police officer who got promoted and retired with a conferred IPS.

Riyas did his schooling at St. Joseph's Boys' Higher Secondary School, Kozhikode and joined Farook College, Kozhikode for his pre-degree education. He continued in the same college for his under-graduate degree in BCom. Later he earned his law degree from Government Law College, Kozhikode.

== Personal life ==
He married Dr. Sameeha Saithalavi in 2002. In 2015, Sameeha accused Riyas of mental and physical abuse. The court issued an interim order for police protection for Sameeha and her children. Divorced in 2015, they have two sons: Ishan Muhammed and Rayyan Muhammed On 15 June 2020, he married T. Veena Vijayan, the daughter of then Kerala Chief Minister Pinarayi Vijayan.

== Political career ==
During his school days in St Joseph Boys High School, Kozhikode Mohammed Riyas was active with SFI. In his 8th standard, he became the President of the SFI unit committee, and in the next year, he became the unit secretary of the school committee. In his pre-degree days in Farook College, Kozhikode he was elected as the first-year pre-degree representative of the college. In 1994 Riyas became the unit president of SFI committee in Farook College, and in the next conference he became the secretary of the unit. From Farook college, he won the post for university union councillor of Calicut University in 1996–97. Later he became a university union office-bearer in 1998. Riyas gradually became a prominent leader of SFI.

Riyas was a member of the DYFI, where he rose to become the president and finally the secretary of DYFI Kozhikode District Committee. From 2010-16 he worked in the state centre of DYFI Kerala committee. During this period, he held the office of State Vice President and later Joint Secretary of DYFI Kerala state committee. In 2016, he was elected as the All-India Joint Secretary of DYFI. In 2017, he became the All India President of DYFI.

Riyas also joined the CPI(M) in 1993, where he was a district committee member for Kozhikode, as well as a state committee member. In 2022 he became State Secretariat member of CPIM Kerala.

=== Electoral politics ===
During the 2009 Indian general election, Riyas was the CPI(M) candidate for Kozhikode. M. K. Raghavan won the constituency with a margin of 838 votes over Riyas which was one of the lowest margins in the history of Kerala lok sabha election history. Riyas contested the election result with a petition to the Kerala High Court alleging that Raghavan had published propaganda against him in print media. The petition was dismissed on 17 May 2010.

2021 Kerala Legislative Assembly Elections (Beypore) After his term as the national president of the DYFI, he was assigned by the party to focus on Kerala state politics. In the 2021 Kerala Legislative Assembly elections, he contested from the Beypore constituency, a known stronghold for the Left Democratic Front (LDF).

- Result: Riyas secured a decisive victory, defeating Adv. P. M. Niyas of the INC by a margin of 28,747 votes. He secured 49.73% of the total votes polled.
- Cabinet Appointment: Following this victory, he was inducted into the second Pinarayi Vijayan ministry, assuming the portfolios of Public Works and Tourism.

2026 Kerala Legislative Assembly Elections As the 2026 state assembly elections approach, Riyas has been announced as the CPI(M) candidate to defend his seat in the Beypore constituency.

== Electoral performance ==
Election candidature history
| Election | Year | Constituency | Result | Margin |
|---|---|---|---|---|
| Lok sabha | 2009 | Kozhikode | Lost | 838 |
| Kerala Legislative Assembly | 2021 | Beypore | Won | 28747 |

P. A. Muhammed Riyas won from the constituency Beypore on margin of 28,747 votes in 2021 Kerala Assembly Elections.

=== Political views ===
Riyas has criticised and opposed the Citizenship (Amendment) Act 2019 (CAA). He views the opposition against the CAA as a struggle for defending the Constitution of India. On 6 January 2020, he led a rally against the CAA with 100,000 people at Kozhikode Beach.
