= Mangalam TV =

Malayalam satellite TV channel

- Final logo used from 2017 to 2022
- Country: India
- Broadcast area: Indian sub-continent, Middle East, Europe, North America
- Headquarters: Thiruvananthapuram, Kerala, India

Programming
- Language(s): Malayalam

Ownership
- Owner: Mangalam Publications

History
- Launched: 26 March 2017; 8 years ago
- Closed: 31 January 2022; 3 years ago

Links
- Website: Dissolved

Mangalam TV was an Indian 24-hour Malayalam-language free-to-air news channel headquartered in Thiruvananthapuram, Kerala.

The channel ran into financial troubles and shut down all operations by the end of 2022. In early 2023, South Indian Bank confiscated its assets, including studio and equipment.

== Controversy ==
On its launch day, Mangalam TV aired a telephonic audio clip in which Transport Minister AK Saseendran was allegedly heard speaking in a sexually explicit way to someone whom the channel claimed was a housewife. Saseendran resigned as minister the same day. The Chief Minister, Pinarayi Vijayan, had inaugurated the channel launch.

After initially denying allegations of a smear campaign, Mangalam TV's CEO Ajith Kumar eventually apologised and admitted that it was a sting operation done by a female journalist employed by the channel.

On 4 April, Kumar and four media people of the channel were arrested by the Kerala Police for airing an "obscene conversation" and for criminal conspiracy.

Later, Saseendran was acquitted in the case after the complainant, who had earlier alleged sexual harassment, turned hostile in court; he returned as Transport Minister.
