= Kokkallur =

Coordinates: 11.44586°N 75.80000°E

- village
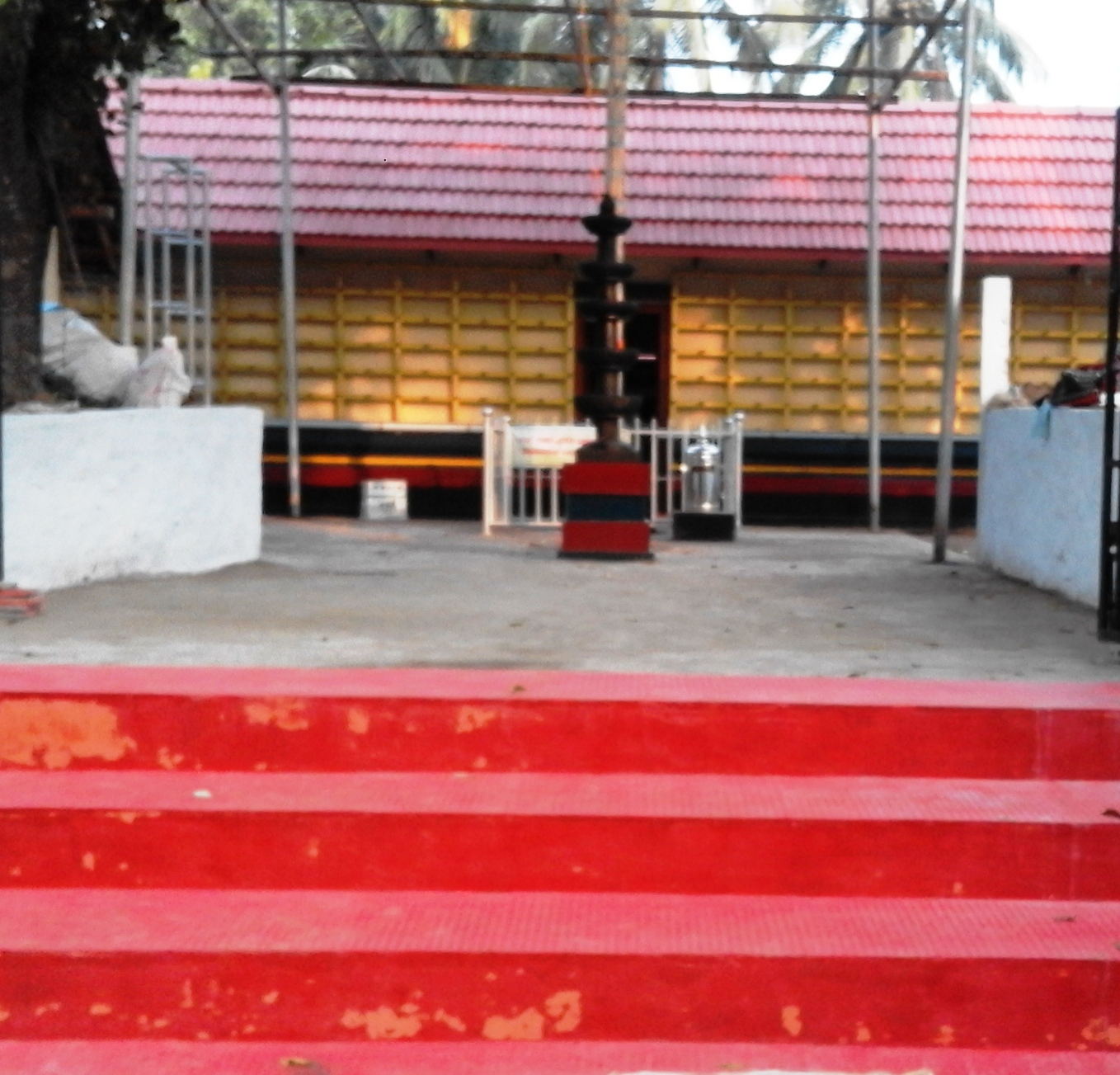
- Balussery Temple
- Interactive map of Kokkallur
- Country: India
- State: Kerala
- District: Kozhikode

Languages
  - Official: Malayalam, English
- Time zone: UTC+5:30 (IST)
- Vehicle registration: KL-

Kokkallur is a village in Kozhikode district of Kerala, India and located in the outskirts of Balussery town. It is also a ward in Balussery Panchyat. People of this area earns their lives by farming. A higher secondary school, village office, Gramin Bank, and telephone exchange are the main government establishments. When India was under British power, Kachery of British Police was situated near by area. This Kachery was burnt by freedom fighters in freedom struggle movement. This place is now known as Kachery kunnu.

== Art forms ==
Theyyam or Thira is main traditional art form. Theyyam is performed in connection with the Festival of Temples. Vechilott Thalachillon temple is very famous in Thira festival. Every year on Meenam 18,19 the Temple festival is celebrated here. Vechilott is an ancient nair tharavadu. This nair family conducts the celebration with the help of people in and around.

== Balikkala ==
Balikkala is a ritualistic art form Kozhikode District, especially in Koyilandy Taluk. So many Balikkala artists had lived in Kokkallur area once. As the name indicates, it is related with fertility, or rather it is a sorcery for protecting pregnancy. It was performed long ago when the people were not much aware of modern medicine. This traditional art form was performed mainly either for caring the pregnancy period or to drive out evil from a possessed girl.

It takes place at the residence of Piniyal (the possessed). Before the Balikkala is started the main performer, who is also a Sorcerer will make an artificial Kavu (a divine garden) with five type of herbs in the courtyard. Then a kalam (a floor decorated with figures of deities) is created by him and his assistants with five coloured herbal powders. The possessed girl is seated in the left side of kalam and the singers, especially female singers begin to work accompanying by musical instruments such as arippara and chenda. The five embodiments such as Gandharvan, Bhairavan, Kuttichathan, Chamundi and Bhadrakali are eulogised in the song. This performance will start in the evening and will continue till the next day early in the morning. When the song is at its climax the possessed lady will be in a frenzy and her body trembles. She becomes unconscious and the song and music is stopped then.

Now these rituals are instincts. The remaining members of the community says that they had performed the last Balikkala 35 years ago.

- Kana eythu

Kana eythu is a primitive form of archery, which was an enjoyment for the hundreds of people at Festival seasons. People of this area, especially of Chavittan para would celebrate Onam Festival only with a few special games at that time, since the electronic media or even News paper was very rare at that time. The people would divide into two groups namely vadakkar (Northern) and Thekkar (Southern) for the competition. Then they with arrows made of coconut leaves and bows made of bamboo panels make the war. They would shoot at the target placed about 100 metres far away from them. The size of object placed would change as small sizes, gradually while the game was improving. When an arrow hit on the object the shooter could run after and would accept a handful of arrows as a gift. Meanwhile, if another one hit arrow on the object, just the same time the former hit, the later would be the recipient of gift. Moreover, his gang would make fun of others. At last the winners were selected by weighing the arrows they shot. Chavittanpara is one among a few places where this ancient game is still remaining. Now Krishna Memorial Arts and sports club is the promoter of this game.
