= K. A. Jayaseelan =

Indian essayist, linguist, & poet (born 1940)

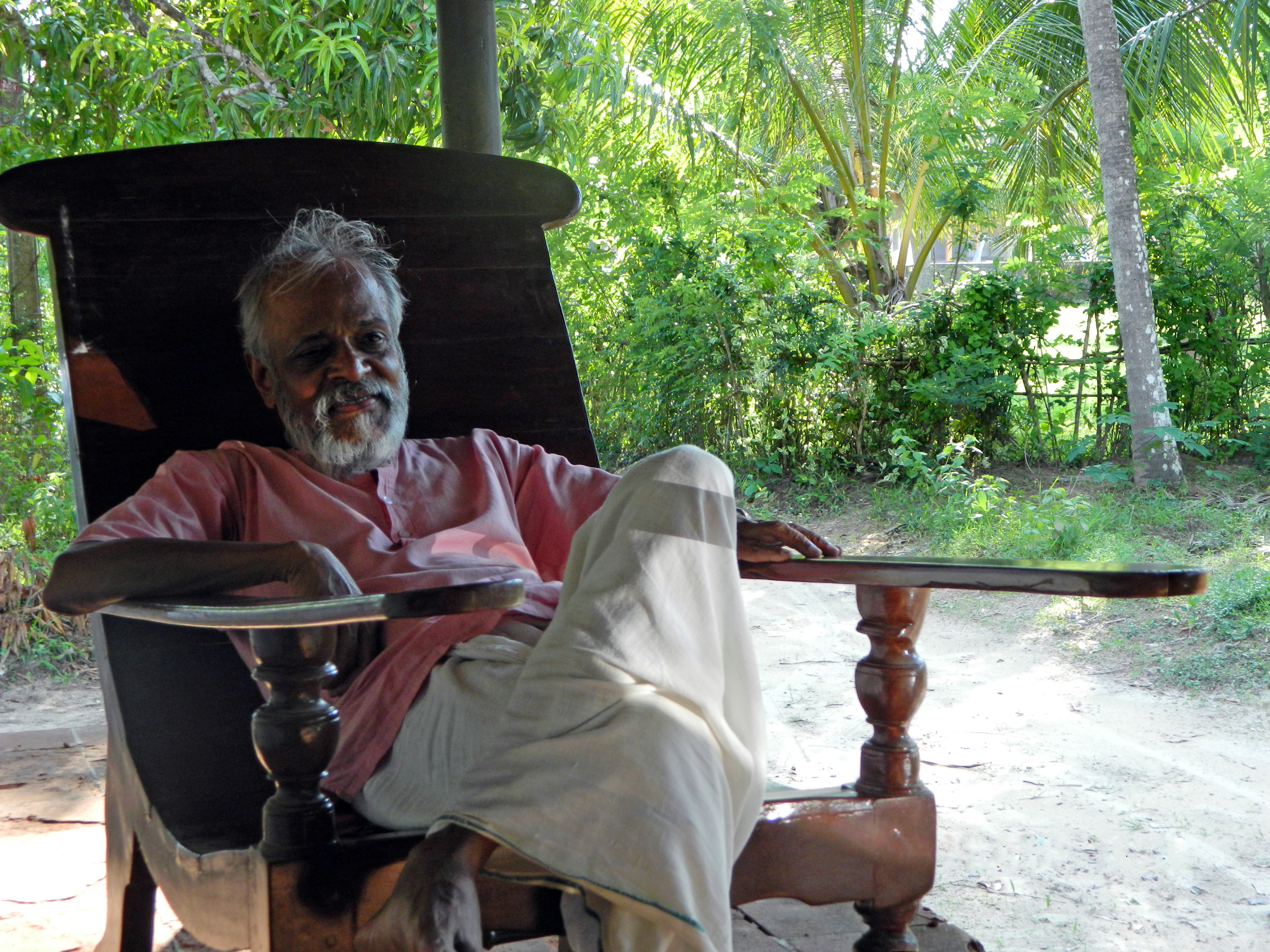
- Born: Karattuparambil Achuthan Jayaseelan; 27 July 1940; Kerala, India
- Occupations: Poet, essayist, linguist
- Spouse: Amritavalli

Karattuparambil Achuthan Jayaseelan (born 27 July 1940) is an Indian linguist, essayist and a poet of Malayalam literature. He is known for his poems characterized by philosophical thoughts and his contributions to the linguistics of South Indian languages.

== Biography ==
Jayaseelan was born on 27 July 1940 to K. R. Achuthan, a lawyer and Umbooli, a school teacher and the eldest daughter of Mithavaadi Krishnan. His early education was at Basel Mission School and the Government Ganapat School, Feroke after which he did his college education at Farook College and Madras Christian College to earn an MA (1960) and MLitt (1963) in English literature. Subsequently, he secured a doctoral degree in English literature from Visva-Bharati University in 1970. His career as an English teacher spanned across several institutions such as Madras Christian College, PSG College of Arts and Science, Coimbatore, St. Thomas College, Thrissur and Regional college of Education, Bhopal, till he settled at the Central Institute of English Foreign Languages as a lecturer in 1970 and by the time he retired from service, it had been upgraded as the present-day English and Foreign Languages University. In between, he earned a master's degree in linguistics from Lancaster University in 1973 and a doctoral degree from Simon Fraser University in 1980. He continues his association past his superannuation as an adjunct faculty of linguistics.

Jayaseelan is married to Amritavalli, an academic, co-author of one of his books and his colleague and the couple have two children, Annapoorna and Maitreyi.

== Legacy ==
Jayaseelan's poetry is noted for its intense philosophical overtone, often presented in a witty manner. The first of his poetry anthologies was published in 1986 under the title, Aarohanam. This was followed by a number of anthologies which include Kavithakal (1997), Jayaseelante Kavithakal (2008), Viswaroopan (2013) and Aamayum Kaalavum (2015). His contributions in linguistics are marked by a leaning towards the generative grammar of Noam Chomsky. He has published many essays on linguistics and Parametric studies in Malayalam syntax is one of his studies published under CIEFL Akshara series. He serves as an editorial board member of the Linguistic Analysis, an international journal published by the University of Washington and dedicated to publishing contents in phonology, morphology, syntax and semantics. He is also an editorial board member of Syntax, a Wiley journal.

== Awards and recognition ==
"Language in India", a UGC approved linguistics journal, issued a festschrift on Jayaseelan in 2003 where many of his linguistics theories in Malayalam have been discussed. Four years later, another festschrift was published on him under the title, Linguistic Theory and South Asian Languages, Essays in honour of K. A. Jayaseelan which termed Jayaseelan as one of present-day India’s most influential linguists. In 2012, he received the inaugural V.T. Kumaran Foundation Award. Kerala Sahitya Akademi lifetime achievement award November 2022

== Bibliography ==
=== Poetry ===
- Jayaseelan, K. A. (1986). Aarohanam. Kottayam: National Book Stall.
- Jayaseelan, K. A. (1997). Kavithakal. Kottayam: Chithira Publishers.
- Jayaseelan, K. A. (2008). Jayaśīlant̲e kavitakaḷ. Trś̥ūr: Currant̲ Books. ISBN 9788122607048. OCLC 299379077.
- Jayaseelan, K. A. (2013). Viswaroopan (in Malayalam). insightpublica. www.insightpublica.comASIN 9382709401.
- Jayaseelan, K. A. (2015). Āmayuṃ kālavuṃ. Kottayam. ISBN 9788126465064. OCLC 950203466.

=== Linguistics ===
- A., Jayaseelan, K. (1999). Parametric studies in Malayalam syntax. New Delhi: Allied Publishers. ISBN 978-8170239444. OCLC 42762086.
- Jayaseelan, K. A. (2005). Issues in Chomskyan linguistics. CIEFL bulletin, Special issue. OCLC 255839161.
- K A Jayaseelan; R Amritavalli (2018). Dravidian syntax and universal grammar. New York, NY: Oxford University Press. ISBN 9780190630225. OCLC 957554630.

=== Essays on Linguistics ===
- Jayaseelan, K. A. (2018). "Topic, Focus and Adverb Positions in Clause Structure" (PDF).
- Jayaseelan, K. A. (2001). "IP-internal topic and focus phrases". Studia Linguistica. 55 (1): 39–75. doi:10.1111/1467-9582.00074. ISSN 0039-3193.
- Jayaseelan, K. A. (2001). "Questions and Question-word Incorporating Quantifiers in Malayalam". Syntax. 4 (2): 63–93. doi:10.1111/1467-9612.00037. ISSN 1368-0005.
- Jayaseelan, K.A. (1997). "Anaphors as Pronouns". Studia Linguistica. 51 (2): 186–234. doi:10.1111/1467-9582.00012. ISSN 0039-3193.

== See also ==
- Theoretical linguistics
- Binding (linguistics)
