= Purushan Kadalundy =

Indian politician

Purushan Kadalundi
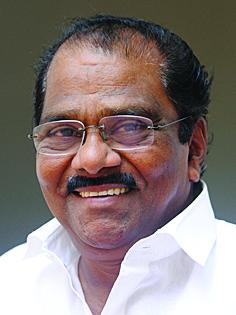
- Purushan Kadalundy

Member of Kerala Legislative Assembly
- In office 13 May 2011 – 2 May 2021
- Preceded by: A. K. Saseendran
- Succeeded by: K. M. Sachin Dev
- Constituency: Balussery

Personal details
- Born: 15 November 1957 (age 68) Kadalundi
- Party: Communist Party of India (Marxist)
- Spouse: M.C Chandrika
- Children: 3 sons

Purushan Kadalundi (born 15 November 1957; Kadalundi) is a member of 13th Kerala Legislative Assembly. He belongs to Communist Party of India (Marxist) and represents Balussery constituency.

== Political and literary life ==
He started his political career through K.S.Y.F. He was arrested for presenting the play Pattini (hunger) during national emergency. He has received Jyothi Bahulae National Award of Kendra Dalit Sahitya Academy (2002), Abu Dhabi Sakthi Award (2005), Sreekantan Nair Smaraka Puraskaram, V.K. Krishana Menon Award, Thoppil Bhasi Award and National Safety Award. He has served as the secretary of Kerala Sahitya Academy. Presently, he is the state vice president of Purogamana Kala Sahitya Sangam and member of Samskarika Kshemanithi Board. He is also the director of Kerala SC/ST Development Corporation and Chairman of Orchard Theatre for Children.

== Personal life ==
He is the son of P.K Kanaran and Ammalukutty. He is a playwright, and writer. He is married to M.C Chandrika and has three sons. He resides at Chevarambalam, Kozhikode.
