= A. K. Saseendran =

Indian politician (born 1946)

A.K.Saseendran
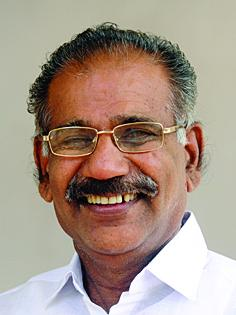

Minister for Forests, Wild Life Protection Government of Kerala
- In office 20 May 2021 – 18 May 2026
- Preceded by: K. Raju
- Succeeded by: Shibu Baby John

Minister for Transport, Government of Kerala
- In office 1 February 2018 – 03 May 2021
- Preceded by: Thomas Chandy
- Succeeded by: Antony Raju
- In office 25 May 2016 – 26 March 2017
- Preceded by: Thiruvanchoor Radhakrishnan
- Succeeded by: Thomas Chandy

Member of the Kerala Legislative Assembly
- In office 1 June 2011 – 23 May 2026
- Preceded by: Established
- Succeeded by: Vidya Balakrishnan
- Constituency: Elathur

Personal details
- Born: 29 January 1946 (age 80) Kannur, Malabar District, Madras Presidency, British India (present-day Kerala, India)
- Party: NCP-SP (2024-present)
- Other political affiliations: Congress (S) (1978-1987); IC(S)-SCS (1987-1999); NCP (1999-2024)
- Spouse: Anitha Krishnan N. T.
- Children: Varun Saseendran
- Parents: K. Kunhambu; M. K. Janaki

A. Kunhambu Saseendran (born 29 January 1946) is an Indian politician who served as the Minister for Forests and Wildlife Protection of Kerala from 2021 to 2026. He previously served as the Minister for Transport of Kerala from 2018 to 2021 and from 2016 to 2017. He was a Member of the Kerala Legislative Assembly representing Elathur from 2011 to 2026. He previously represented Peringalam from 1980 to 1982, Edakkad from 1982 to 1987 and Balussery from 2006 to 2011 in the Kerala Legislative Assembly. He is a member of the Nationalist Congress Party.

== Personal life ==
Saseendran was born in Kannur on 29 January 1946 to K. Kunhambu and M. K. Janaki. He is married to Anitha Krishnan N T, and has one son, Varun. He resides at Mele Chovva, Kannur.

== Political life ==
One among the senior leaders in Kerala politics. A native of Elayavoor in Kannur, Saseendran started his political career through KSU in 1962. After holding various party posts, he joined Congress (S) in 1978. Later he joined NCP and currently he is a member of national working committee since 2006. He was elected to the Assembly in 1980 from Peringalam, 1982 from Edakkad, 2006 from Balussery and three times consecutively from Elathur during 2011,2016 and 2021 elections.

=== Positions held ===
- President, District Committee, Kerala Students Union Kozhikode (1963–66)
- General Secretary, Kerala Students Union (1967–69)
- General Secretary (1969–77)
- Vice President (1969–78) and President (1978-80)
- Kerala Pradesh Youth Congress Committee (1978–80)
- Member, Coffee Board (1978–80)
- ISCUS (1977–81)
- Governing Board of Kerala Saksharata Samiti (1987-91 & 1992-97)
- Kerala State Housing Board (1997-2001)
- Vice-President, Jawaharlal Nehru Public Library and Research Centre, Kannur
- General Secretary, Congress (U) & Indian Congress Socialist (Congress(S))
- Member, Advisory Committee, Food Corporation of India
- State General Secretary, State Vice President, National Committee Member, Working Committee Member and Parliamentary Party leader of Nationalist Congress Party (N.C.P.)
- Kerala Legislative Assembly; Minister for Transport (from 25-5-2016 to 27-3-2017 and 01-2-2018 to 03-05-2021)
- Kerala Legislative Assembly; Minister for Forests, Wild Life Protection (from 20-5-2021)

Kerala Legislative Assembly Election
Year	Constituency	Closest Rival	Majority (Votes)	Won/Lost
1980	Peringalam	K. C. Marar (JNP)	5890	Won
1982	Edakkad	K. Sudhakaran (Janata-G)	7543	Won
1987	Cannanore	P. Bhaskaran (INC)	8048	Lost
1991	Cannanore	N. Ramakrishnan (INC)	14805	Lost
2006	Balusseri	K Balakrishnan Kidavu(INC)	14160	Won
2011	Elathur	Shaik P Harriz (SJD)	14654	Won
2016	Elathur	Kishen Chand (JD(U))	29057	Won
2021	Elathur	Sulphikar Mayoori (IND)	38502	Won
2026	Elathur	Vidya Balakrishnan (INC)	12162	Lost

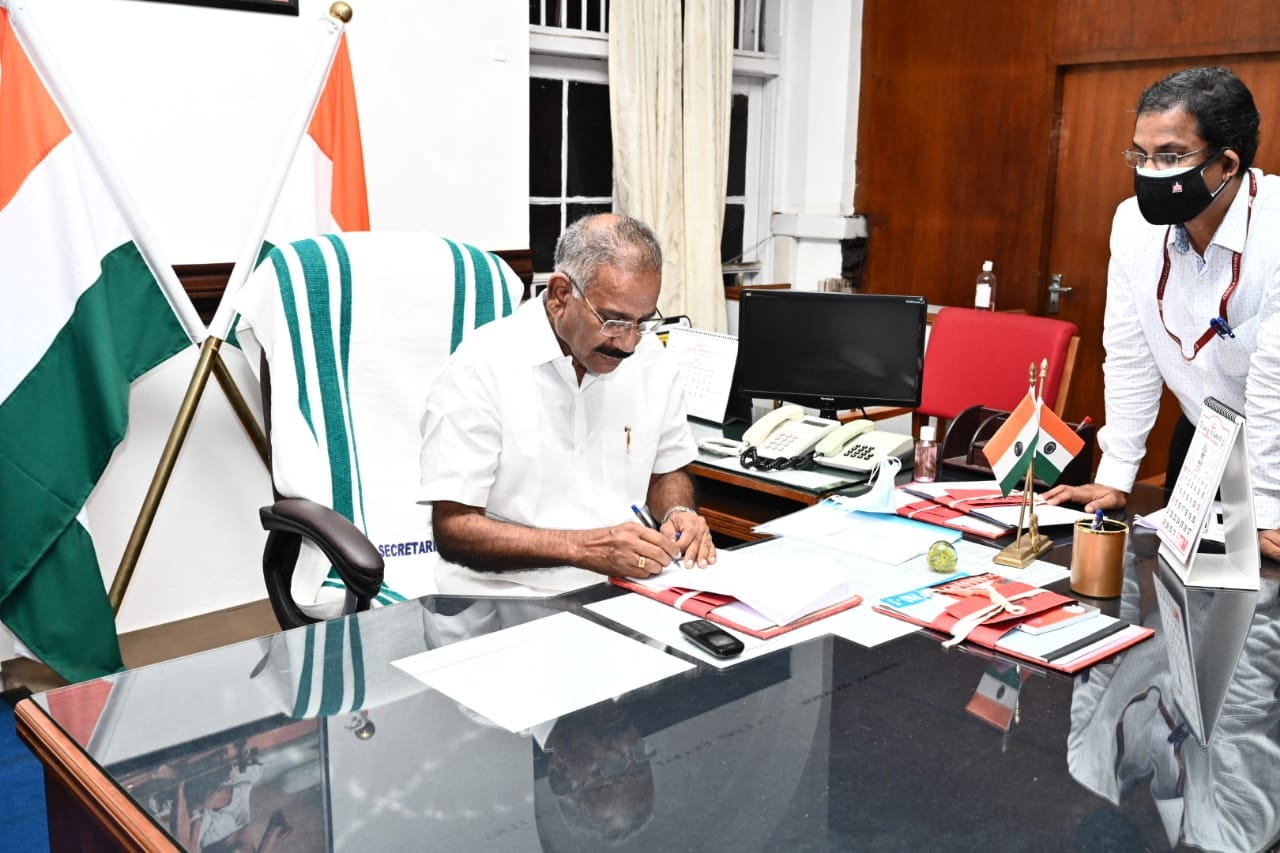
In office

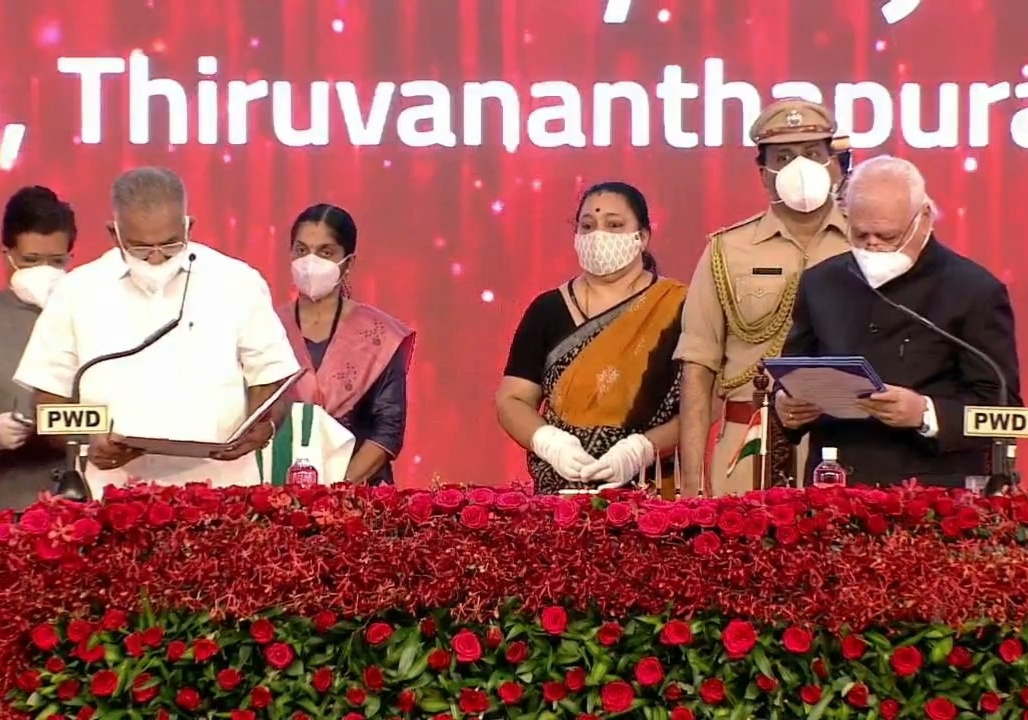
Shri. A K Saseendran swearing-in as Minister of Forests, Wild Life protection.

== Controversy ==
On 26 March 2017, Saseendran resigned as minister after a newly launched Malayalam television channel, Mangalam TV, aired a telephonic audio clip that portrayed him speaking in a sexually explicit way to someone whom the channel claimed was a housewife.

After initially denying allegations of conspiring against Saseendran, Mangalam TV's CEO eventually apologised and admitted that it was a sting operation done by a female journalist employed by the channel.

On 4 April, the CEO and four media people of Mangalam TV were arrested by the Kerala Police for airing an "obscene conversation" and for criminal conspiracy.

Later, Saseendran was acquitted in the case after the complainant, who had earlier alleged sexual harassment, turned hostile in court; he returned to his previous position as minister. Saseendran was the second Minister to resign from the first Pinarayi Vijayan ministry.
