= K. M. Sachin Dev =

Indian politician

Adv. K. M. Sachin Dev
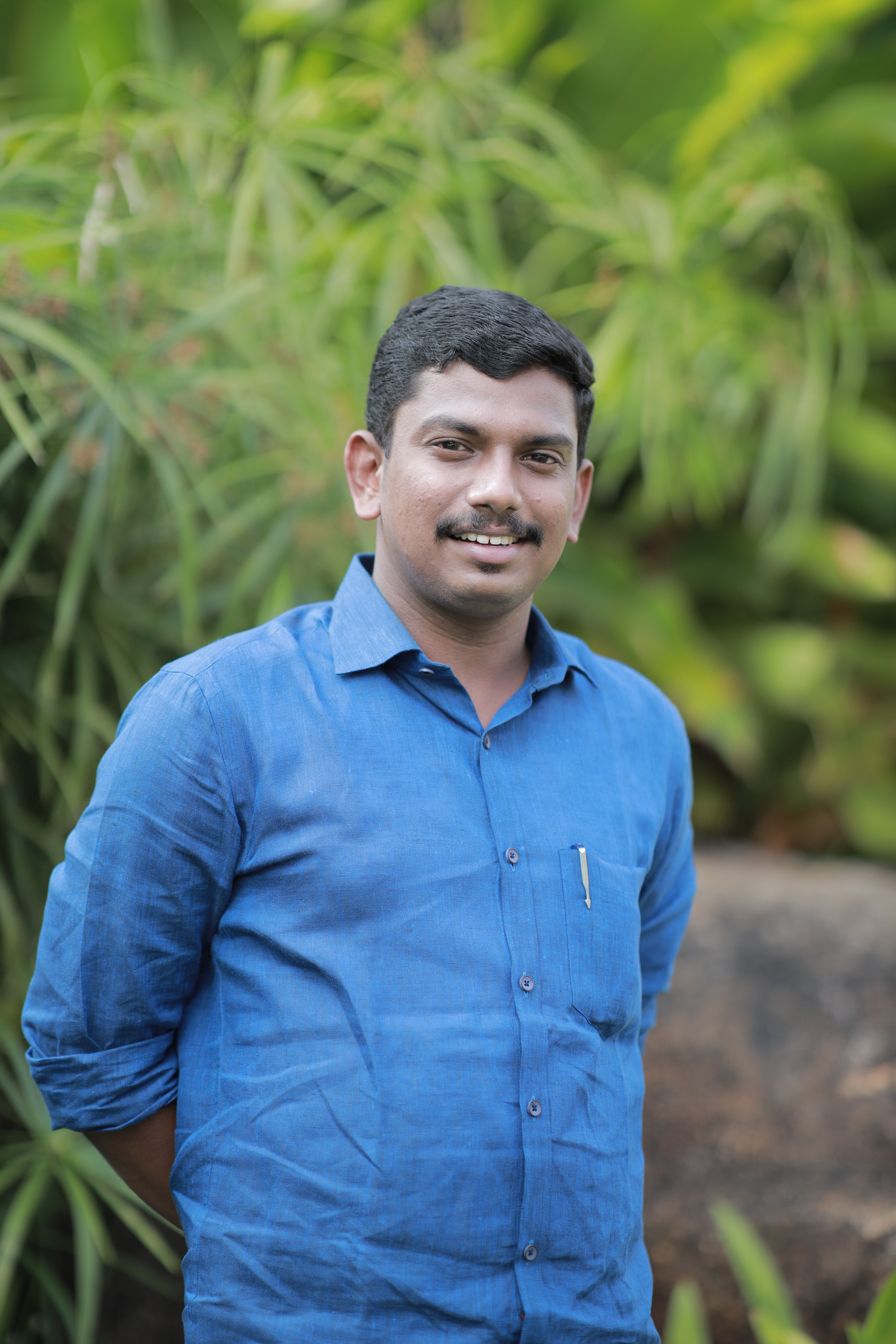

Member of the Kerala Legislative Assembly
- In office May 2021 – May 2026
- Preceded by: Purushan Kadalundy
- Succeeded by: V. T. Sooraj
- Constituency: Balussery

State Secretary Students Federation of India, Kerala

Personal details
- Born: 18 October 1993 (age 32) Nellikkode, Kozhikode, Kerala, India
- Party: Communist Party of India (Marxist)
- Spouse: Arya Rajendran (m. 2022)
- Children: 1
- Education: Government College, Meenchantha (BA); Government Law College, Kozhikode (LLB)

Kachilatt Mannarakkal Sachin Dev is an Indian politician from Kerala. He was the member of Kerala Legislative Assembly from Balussery constituency, from May 2021 to May 2026. He was the youngest MLA in 15th Kerala Legislative Assembly. He was the State Secretary of Students' Federation of India, Kerala State Committee.

== Early life ==
Sachin Dev was born to Sheeja and K. M. Nandakumar of Kachilatt Mannarakkal house at Nellikode in Kozhikode district of Kerala, India. His father is a retired employee in Mathrubhumi. His mother is a teacher at GHSS Medical College Campus, Kozhikode. He has a sister, Sandra. Sachin completed his schooling from Savio HSS Devagiri and GHSS Medical College Campus, Kozhikode. He did his BA in English literature from Government College, Meenchantha. He pursued LLB from Government Law College, Kozhikode and enrolled as a lawyer in 2019.

== Career ==
=== Student politics ===
He started his political life as a member of Students Federation of India (SFI). He was the former chairman of the Government Arts and Science College, Kozhikode. He has held the office of president and later secretary of SFI Kozhikode district committee. He was the state secretary of SFI committee in Kerala, and the All India Joint Secretary of SFI.

=== Party politics ===
Sachin Dev is a Kozhikode Town Area Committee member of CPI(M). In 2021 Kerala Legislative Assembly election he won against Dharmajan Bolgatty at Balussery Constituency with a lead of 20,372 votes. He was also the youngest in the list of candidates announced by the CPI(M) for the 2021 state assembly polls.

== Personal life ==
In 2022, he married Arya Rajendran, who is a former Mayor of Thiruvananthapuram Corporation.
