= Kakkur =

- village
- Location in Kerala, India Kakkur (India)
- Coordinates: 11°23′0″N 75°49′0″E
- Country: India
- State: Kerala
- District: Kozhikode

Population (2011)
  - Total: 22,788

Languages
  - Official: Malayalam, English
- Time zone: UTC+5:30 (IST)
- Vehicle registration: KL-76

Kakkur is a village in Kozhikode district in the state of Kerala, India. It is blessed by nature with hills and rivers. Pokkunnu is a small hill situated in northern Kakkur.

== Demographics ==
As of 2011 India census, Kakkur had a population of 22788 with 10696 males and 12092 females.
