= M. K. Raghavan =

Indian politician (born 1952)

M.K. Raghavan
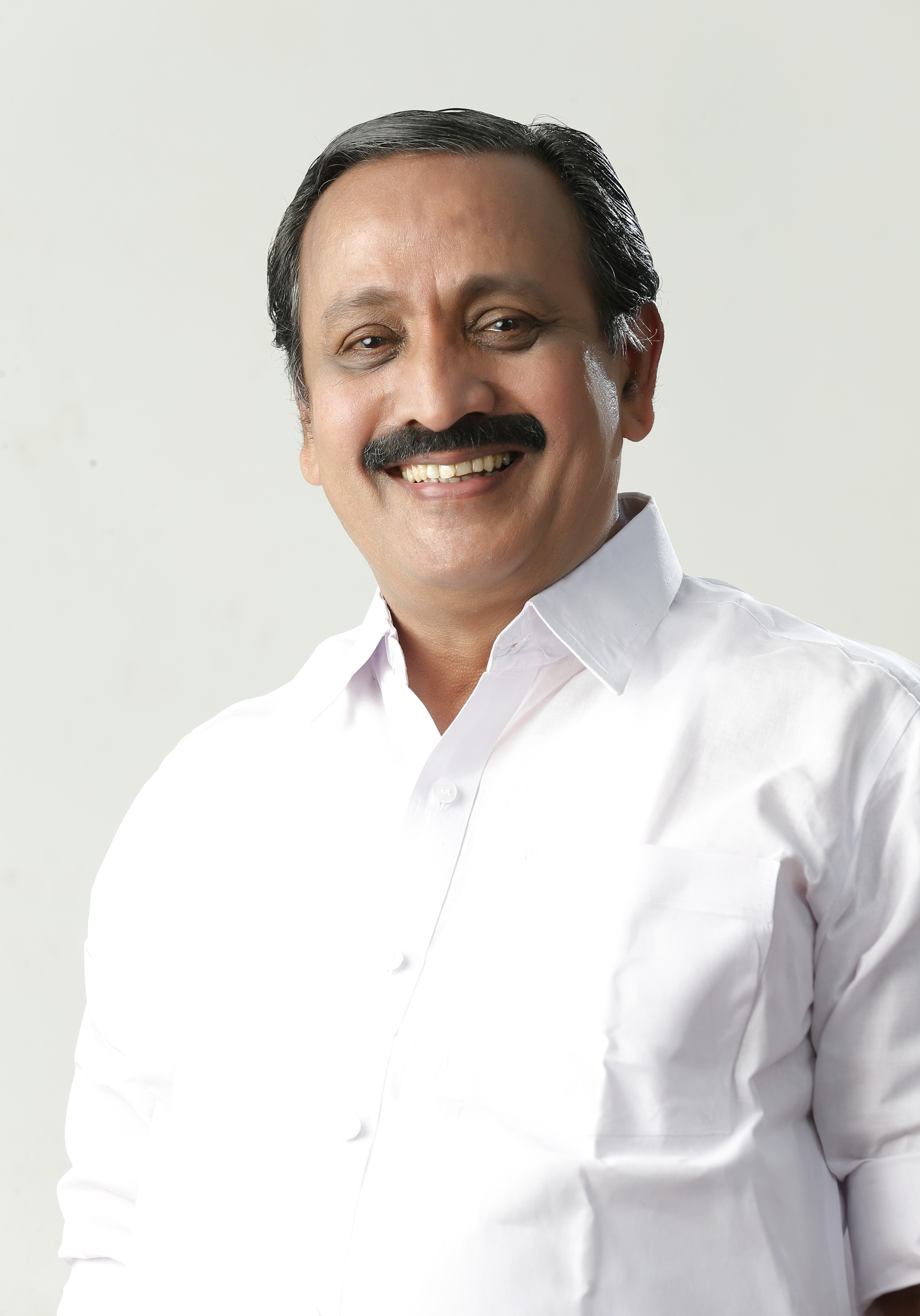
- Member of Parliament

Secretary Congress Parliamentary Party
- Incumbent
- Assumed office 10 September 2024

Member of Parliament, Lok Sabha
- Incumbent
- Assumed office 31 May 2009
- Preceded by: M. P. Veerendra Kumar
- Constituency: Kozhikode, Kerala

Personal details
- Born: 21 April 1952 (age 73) Payyannur, Kannur
- Party: Indian National Congress
- Spouse: Usha Kumari
- Children: 2
- Website: mkraghavan.in

M. K. Raghavan (born 21 April 1952) is an Indian politician. He is a Member of Lok Sabha and a Secretary of Congress Parliamentary Party.

Representing the Kozhikode Lok Sabha constituency of Kerala, he is a member of the INC. A former General Secretary of the KPCC. He was born to Krishnan Nambiar and Janaki Amma on 21 April 1952 at Payyannur, Kerala.

Fielded as a strong candidate by the UDF in the LDF bastion of Kozhikode in the 2009 Lok Sabha election, M. K. Raghavan managed to wrangle victory by defeating then DYFI National President P. A. Muhammad Riyas. He won the 2009 election by a meagre 838 vote margin.

However, he cemented his victory with much better margins in the 2014 Lok Sabha with 16,883 votes by defeating former CPIM State Secretary & Polit Bureau Member A. Vijayaraghavan. For the third term, M K Raghavan was fielded again from Kozhikode Lok Sabha constituency in 2019 and won by record lead with 85,225 votes by defeating CPIM's strong candidate and sitting MLA A. Pradeepkumar. It is noted that he retained this seat under extreme conditions, even facing some false allegations during the election period.

In his fourth term, he won from the Kozhikode constituency with a lead of 1,42,087 votes, defeating the strong candidate Elamaram Kareem, former Minister of Kerala, then Rajya Sabha MP, floor leader of CPIM in Rajya Sabha and CPIM's Trade Union (CITU) leader. This was a historical victory of M K Raghavan and historical defeat of CPIM in the constituency since its inception.

Currently he is serving as a Secretary of Congress Parliamentary Party, which is a Parliamentary board of Indian National Congress Headed by Sonia Gandhi. He is also a Member of Political Affairs Committee of Kerala Pradesh Congress Committee, the apex body of Indian National Congress in the state Kerala.

== Positions Held ==
Date/Period	Position Held
June 2024	Elected to 18th Lok Sabha (4th Term); Member, Committee on Estimates 14 Aug 2024 onwards; Member, Committee on Railways 26 Sep 2024 onwards
May 2019 - 2024	Re-elected to 17th Lok Sabha (3rd term); Member, Standing Committee on Petroleum and Natural Gas 13 Sep 2019 onwards; Member, Committee on Government Assurances 09 Oct 2019 onwards; Member, Consultative Committee, Ministry of Road Transport and Highways
May 2014 - 2019	Re-elected to 16th Lok Sabha (2nd term); Member, Standing Committee on Health and Family Welfare (1 Sep 2014 – 25 May 2019); Member, Consultative Committee, Ministry of Labour and Employment; Member, Joint Committee on Offices of Profit (11 Dec 2014 – 25 May 2019)
2009 - 2014	Elected to 15th Lok Sabha (1st Term); Member, Standing Committee on Health and Family Welfare (31 Aug 2009); Member, Committee on Absence of Members from the Sittings of the House 21 Apr 2012 – 18 May 2014; Member, Standing Committee on Human Resource Development 2013 – 18 May 2014

Preceded by M.P. Veerendra Kumar	MP of Kozhikode; 2009 – present	Incumbent
