= Kinalur =

- village
- Location in Balussery, Kozhikode, Kerala, India Kinalur (India)
- Coordinates: 11°28′0″N 75°50′0″E
- Country: India
- State: Kerala
- District: Kozhikode

Population (2011)
  - Total: 9,930

Languages
  - Official: Malayalam, English
- Time zone: UTC+5:30 (IST)
- Vehicle registration: KL-76

Kinalur is a village in Kozhikode District in the state of Kerala, India. It is located in the outskirts of Balussery town. Kinalur is situated near by Balussery in Koyilandy - Edavanna State Highway.

== Demographics ==
As of the 2011 Census of India, Kinalur had a population of 9,930 with 4664 males and 5266 females.

== See also ==
- Kinalur inscription
