= Vidya Balakrishnan =

Indian politician

- വിദ്യ ബാലകൃഷ്ണൻ

Member of the Kerala Legislative Assembly
- Incumbent
- Assumed office 2026
- Preceded by: A. K. Saseendran
- Constituency: Elathur

Personal details
- Born: 1986 (age 39–40) Pilassery, Kozhikode district, Kerala, India
- Citizenship: Indian
- Party: Indian National Congress
- Education: Government Law College, Kozhikode (BA;LL.B)
- Occupation: Advocate, politician

Vidya Balakrishnan (born 1986) is an Indian politician from Kerala. She is a Member of the Legislative Assembly from Elathur in Kozhikode district representing the Indian National Congress. She is one of the 11 elected woman MLAs in 2026.

Vidya is from Kozhikode, Kerala, graduated Law from Government Law College, Kozhikode. She is a lawyer and a two time councillor.

Vidya became an MLA for the first time winning the 2026 Kerala Legislative Assembly election from Elathur Assembly constituency representing the Indian National Congress. She polled 77,662 votes and defeated her nearest rival, A. K. Saseendran of the Nationalist Congress Party (Sharadchandra Pawar), by a margin of 12,162 votes.

== Election performance ==
2026 Kerala Legislative Assembly election: Elathur
| Party | Candidate | Votes | % | ±% |
|---|---|---|---|---|
| INC | Vidya Balakrishnan | 77,662 | 43.69 | |
| LDF | A. K. Saseendran | 65,500 | 36.85 | |
| BJP | T. Devadas | 31,510 | 17.73 | |
| NCP | P. K. Saseendran | 692 | 0.39 | |
| AAP | Abdul Basith Atholi | 348 | 0.20 | |
| NOTA | None of the above | 729 | 0.41 | |
| Margin of victory | | 12,162 | | |
| Turnout | | | | |
| INC gain from NCP | | Swing | | |
