= Balussery =

- Town
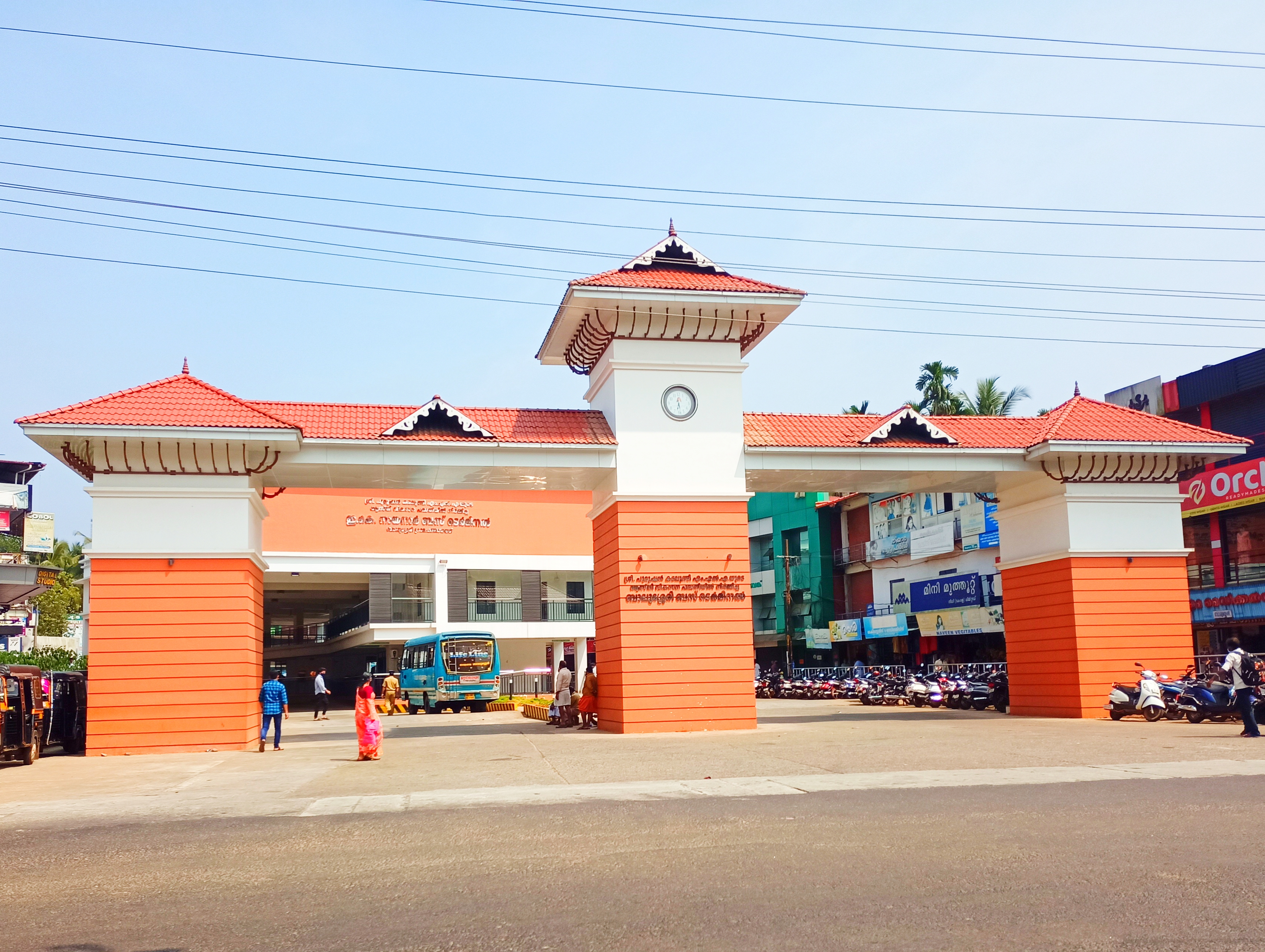
- Balussery Bus Terminal

- Location in Kerala, India
- Coordinates: 11°26′48.454″N 75°49′46.802″E
- Country: India
- State: Kerala
- District: Kozhikode

Government
  - Type: Grama Panchayat
  - Panchayat President: Roopalekha Kombilad (LDF)
  - M.L.A: Adv K. M. Sachin Dev (LDF)
  - M.P: M. K. Raghavan (UDF)

Area
  - Total: 22.44 km^{2} (8.66 sq mi)
- Elevation: 42 m (138 ft)

Population (2011)
  - Total: 27,363
  - Density: 1,219/km^{2} (3,158/sq mi)

Languages
- Time zone: UTC+5:30 (IST)
- PIN: 673612
- Telephone code: 91 496
- Vehicle registration: KL-76 Nanminda RTO
- Website: balussery.com

Balussery is a town located about 25 km northeast of Kozhikode city, situated on State Highway 34. It is one of the 12 block Panchayats in the Kozhikode district and serves as the northeastern entry point to Kozhikode city.

== Geography and Climate ==
Balussery is located about 25 km from Kozhikode, the district headquarters, and is well connected by road to nearby towns. Three main roads lead out from the Balussery city centre. Kozhikode is accessible by two routes: the Balussery-Kozhikode Main Road and the Balussery-Ulliyeri-Kozhikode Road. The major town of Thamarassery is about 15 km away and can be reached via the Koyilandy-Edavanna state highway, while Koyilandy is about 16 km away. Balussery has a bus stand with a shopping complex and serves as the starting point for bus services to all major surrounding areas.

== Overview ==
Social composition in Balussery (2011)
Community	Percent
Thiyyar	45.4%
Other Hindu	30.8%
Islam	23.00%
Christianity	.8%

Balussery block has an area of 278.54 km^{2}. There are eight Grama Panchayats in the block: Atholi, Balussery, Koorachundu, Kottur, Naduvannur, Panangad, Ulliyeri and Unnikulam. The total population is 212,592: 105,962 males and 106,631 females.

Government offices are situated in the heart of the town. Kerala State Electricity Board has a 33 kV substation (at Manjappalam), a division office/subdivision, and a section office here. There is also an employment exchange at Balussery Mukku, a Kerala Police station, a PWD rest house, a Sub Registrar Office, an Educational Department Office, six The Co-operative Bank, State Bank of India, Canara Bank, Syndicate Bank, Punjab National Bank, Federal Bank, Bank of Baroda, HDFC Bank, Union Bank, Axis Bank and ICICI Bank.

Regular bus services operate throughout Kozhikode, Thamarassery, Koyilandy, Perambra, Narikkuni and Cheekilode. Mini-buses connect the hinterland to Balussery Town. KSRTC operates services to the hilly regions of Balussery, like Kinalur, Mankayam, Koorachundu, Kakkayam, Kallanode and Vayalada.

== Education ==
There are three government higher secondary schools located in Balussery. Govt. Vocational Higher Secondary School and GHSS girls high school are near the town, Nanminda HSS and Kokkallur HSS are 3 km away from town. There are also primary and upper primary schools, like Balussery GLP school, A.L.P School Thuruthyad.

There is a central government institute named Adarsha Sanskrit Vidya Peetham, located in Vaikundam, Balussery. It is one of several Sanskrit Colleges in Kerala.

Usha School of Athletics is at Kinalur. Saraswathy Vidya Mandir is situated 2 km away from Balussery.

Jai Rani SABS Public School is an English Medium School in Balussery.

== Politics ==
Balussery has been an influential constituency of the LDF. Most of the workers are from CPIM. The Left Front has been winning with a huge lead in successive assembly and panchayat elections. As of the 2021 assembly elections, the current MLA is Adv K.M Sachindev of CPI(M) and he got a massive lead of 20372 votes. The opposite candidates are Dharmajan Bolgaty for UDF and Libin Balussery for NDA. Other political parties in the area are Muslim League, Indian National Congress, BJP, NCP, Janata Dal, welfareparty, and SDPI. While the LDF seem to be dominant force in 2026 as well, recent local reportage highlight outstanding development project for large number of SC colonies as a major issue of contention.

== Notable people ==
- Ranjith - Director
- Girish Puthenchery - Lyricist
- Sarasa Balussery - Actress
- Anoop Menon - Actor
- Sudheesh - Actor

== Transportation ==
Balussery connects to other parts of India through NH 66 and NH 766. The nearest airport is at Kozhikode. The nearest railway station is at Koyilandy.
