= V. K. C. Mammed Koya =

Indian politician

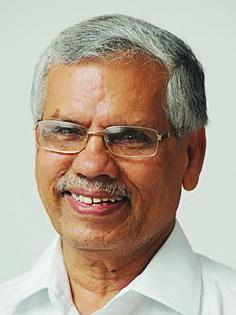

V. K. C. Mammed Koya is an Indian politician from Communist Party of India (Marxist), who was the Member of the Legislative Assembly representing Beypore constituency in Kozhikode district in the Kerala Legislative Assembly and was the mayor of Kozhikode corporation. He was also a previous Member of the Legislative Assembly representing Beypore constituency in Kozhikode district in the Kerala Legislative Assembly from the year 2001 to 2006.

V. K. C. Mammed Koya is the founder of VKC Group (VKC Footwear), a footwear company. With declared assets of more than ₹ 30 crore, he was the second richest MLA in Kerala legislative assembly.

== Early career ==
He has been actively involved in social and political activities. He became the member of Communist Party of India (Marxist) in 1975.

In 1979, he was elected to the panchayath and was the President of Cheruvannur-Nallalam Gram panchayat until it was dissolved by the State Government in 1984. During the same time, he was the director of Feroke Service Co-operative Bank Limited and the President of the Coir Vyavasaya Sahakarana Samkham. He was also a member of the Calicut Development Authority for 5 years.

In 1990s, he was elected to the newly constituted Kozhikode District Council by the State Government from the Cheruvannur Division and was the chairman for the standing committee for Public works. In 1995 he contested the election to the Kozhikode Jilla Panchayath from the Feroke Division and was elected as the Vice President of the Jilla Panchayath. In 2000 again, he contested and won the Kozhikode Jilla Panchayath Election from the Beypore Division.

In 2001, he was elected as a Member of the Legislative Assembly representing Beypore constituency in Kozhikode district in the Kerala Legislative Assembly.

On 18 November 2015, he was elected as the Mayor of Kozhikode.

He got elected to the Kerala Legislative Assembly in 2016 general elections, and had to resign his Mayor post. He was succeeded by Thottathil Raveendran, who was also a former mayor.
