= Political divisions of Kozhikode District =

Kozhikode District has four types of administrative hierarchies:

- Taluk and Village administration managed by the provincial government of Kerala
- Panchayath Administration managed by the local bodies
- Parliament Constituencies for the federal government of India
- Assembly Constituencies for the provincial government of Kerala

== Legislative constituencies ==
Local authorities, and legislative assembly constituencies in Kozhikode district

- Balussery
- Beypore
- Elathur
- Koduvally
- Koyilandy
- Kozhikode North
- Kozhikode South
- Kunnamangalam
- Kuttiady
- Nadapuram
- Perambra
- Thiruvambady
- Vatakara

== Villages in Kozhikode Taluk ==
1. Kasaba
2. Katchery
3. Panniyankara
4. Nagaram
5. Feroke
6. Ramanattukara
7. Kadalundy
8. Karuvanthuruthy
9. Beypore
10. Puthiyangadi
11. Valayanad
12. Cheruvannur
13. Chevayue
14. Nellicode
15. Chelavoor
16. Elathur
17. Thalakulathur
18. Vengeri
19. Kakkodi
20. Olavanna
21. Chelannur
22. Pantheerankavu
23. Kunnamangalam
24. Perumanna
25. Peruvayal
26. Kumaranellur
27. Thazhecode
28. Kakkur
29. Nanminda
30. Kakkad
31. Chathamangalam
32. Poolacode
33. Kuruvattur
34. Kodiyathur
35. Mavoor
36. Kuttikkattur
37. Madavoor
38. Kottuli
39. Raroth
40. Puthiyangadi
41. Valayanad
42. Cheruvannur
43. Chevayur
44. Nellicode
45. Chelavoor
46. Elathur
47. Thalakulathur
48. Vengeri
49. Kakkodi
50. Olavanna
51. Chelannur
52. Pantheerankavu
53. Kunnamangalam
54. Kakkur
55. Nanminda
56. Kakkad
57. Chathamangalam

== Villages in Vatakara Taluk ==
- Azhiyur, Onchiyam and Chorodu
- Eramala, Villiappally and Kottappally
- Ayancherry, Thiruvallur and Maniyur
- Palayad, Nadakkuthazhe and Velom
- Chekkiad, Edacherry and Thuneri
- Nadapuram, Purameri and Kunnummal
- Narippatta, Kayakkodi and Kuttiady
- Kavilumpara, Maruthomkara and Valayam
- Vanimel, Vilangad and Tinur

== Villages in Koyilandy Taluk ==
Koyilandy is the thaluk headquarters of 34 villages. They are: Arikkulam, Atholy, Avitanallur, Balussery, Chakkittapara, Changaroth, Chemancheri, Chempanode, Chengottukavu, Cheruvannur, Eravattur, Iringal, Kayanna, Keezhariyur, Koorachundu, Koothali, Kottur, Kozhukkallur, Menhaniam, Meppayur, Moodadi, Naduvannur, Nochad, Palery, Panangad, Panthalayani, Payyoli, Perambra, Sivapuram, Thikkodi, Thurayur, Ulliyeri, Unnikulam, Viyyur and Muchukunnu.

== Villages in Thamarassery Taluk ==
There are 20 villages in Thamarassery Taluk. They are

- Koodaranji, Thiruvambady and Nellippoyil
- Koduvally, Puthur and Kizhakkoth
- Narikkuni, Raroth and Kedavoor
- Kodanchery, Puduppadi and Koodathai
- Kanthalad, Vavad and Eangapuzha
- Kinaloor, Panangad and Sivapuram

== Kozhikode Parliament Constituency ==
=== Assembly segments ===
Kozhikode Lok Sabha constituency is composed of the following assembly segments:

1. Balusseri
2. Koduvally
3. Kozhikode North
4. Kozhikode South
5. Beypore
6. Kunnamangalam
7. Elathur

=== Members of Parliament ===
Madras

- 1951: K. A. Damodara Menon, Kisan Mazdoor Praja Party
- 1957: K.P. Kutti Krishnan Nair, Indian National Congress

Kerala

- 1962: C.H. Mohammed Koya, Indian Union Muslim League
- 1967: Ebrahim Sulaiman Sait, Indian Union Muslim League
- 1971: Ebrahim Sulaiman Sait, Indian Union Muslim League
- 1977: V.A. Seyid Muhammad, Indian National Congress
- 1980: E. K. Imbichi Bava, Communist Party of India (Marxist)
- 1984: K.G. Adiyodi, Indian National Congress
- 1989: K. Muraleedharan, Indian National Congress
- 1991: K. Muraleedharan, Indian National Congress
- 1996: M.P. Veerendra Kumar, Janata Dal
- 1998: P. Sankaran, Indian National Congress
- 1999: K. Muraleedharan, Indian National Congress
- 2004: M.P. Veerendra Kumar, Janata Dal (Secular)
- 2009: M. K. Raghavan, Indian National Congress
- 2014: M. K. Raghavan, Indian National Congress
- 2019: M. K. Raghavan, Indian National Congress
- 2024: M. K. Raghavan, Indian National Congress

=== Indian general election, 2014 ===
Veteran parliamentarian A. Vijayaraghavan will be the Left Democratic Front (LDF) candidate from Kozhikode constituency in the Lok Sabha Elections 2014. Sitting MP M. K. Raghavan will contest as the United Democratic Front (UDF) candidate and C. K. Padmanabhan as the Bharatiya Janata Party (BJP) candidate.

2014 Indian general election : Kozhikode
Party	Candidate	Votes	%	±%
INC	M K Raghavan	397,615	42.16	−0.76
CPI(M)	A Vijayaraghavan	380,732	40.37	−2.47
BJP	C K Padmanabhan	1,15,760	12.28	+1.03
NOTA	None of the above	6,381	0.68	
Margin of victory		16,883	1.79	+1.68
Turnout		943,009	79.80	
INC hold		Swing		

=== Election results ===
Percentage Changes are based on numbers from the 1999 elections.

2004 Indian general elections: Kozhikode
Party	Candidate	Votes	%	±%
JD(S)	M.P.Veerendra Kumar	340,111	43.54	+3.04
INC	Adv. V. Balaram	274,785	35.18	−11.45
BJP	M.T.Ramesh	97,889	12.53	+2.33
Margin of victory		65,326	8.36	+2.23
Turnout		781,146	70.41	−2.88

== Vatakara Parliament Constituency ==
Vatakara (or Badagara) is a Lok Sabha constituency in Kerala.

=== Assembly segments ===
Vatakara Lok Sabha constituency is composed of the following assembly segments:

1. Thalassery
2. kuthuparamba
3. Vatakara
4. Nadapuram
5. Kuttiady
6. Koyilandy
7. Perambra

=== Members of Parliament ===
- 1957: K.B. Menon, Praja Socialist Party
- 1962: A.V. Raghavan, Independent
- 1967: A. Sreedharan, Samyukta Socialist Party
- 1971: K.P. Unnikrishnan, Indian National Congress
- 1977: K.P. Unnikrishnan, Indian National Congress
- 1980: K.P. Unnikrishnan, Indian National Congress (Urs)
- 1984: K.P. Unnikrishnan, Indian Congress (Socialist)
- 1989: K.P. Unnikrishnan, Indian Congress (Socialist)
- 1991: K.P. Unnikrishnan, Indian Congress (Socialist)
- 1996: O. Bharatan, Communist Party of India (Marxist)
- 1998: A.K. Premajam, Communist Party of India (Marxist)
- 1999: A.K. Premajam, Communist Party of India (Marxist)
- 2004: P. Satheedevi, Communist Party of India (Marxist)
- 2009: Mullappally Ramachandran, Indian National Congress
- 2014: Mullappally Ramachandran, Indian National Congress
- 2019: K. Muraleedharan, Indian National Congress
- 2024: Shafi Parambil, Indian National Congress

=== Indian general election, 2014 ===
Mullappally Ramachandran, the incumbent, was the United Democratic Front (UDF) candidate while A N Shamseer of the CPI(M) contested as the Left Democratic Front (LDF) candidate in the Lok Sabha Elections 2014. VK Sajeevan was the Bharatiya Janata Party (BJP) candidate and Ali Akbar was the candidate for the Aam Admi Party (AAP).

2014 Indian general elections : Vatakara
Party	Candidate	Votes	%	±%
INC	Mullappally Ramachandran	416,479	43.41%	−5.41%
CPI(M)	A N Shamseer	413,173	43.07%	+0.76%
BJP	VK Sajeevan	76,313	7.95%	+3.27%
NOTA	None of the above	6,107	0.64%	−−−
Margin of victory		3,306	0.34%	−6.17%
Turnout		959,342	81.61	
INC gain from CPI(M)		Swing		

== See also ==
- Indian general election, 2014 (Kerala)
- List of constituencies of the Lok Sabha
- Kozhikode (Lok Sabha constituency)
- Vatakara (Lok Sabha constituency)
