= Naduvannur =

- Town
- Location in Kerala, India Naduvannur (India)
- Coordinates: 11°29′0″N 75°46′0″E
- Country: India
- State: Kerala
- District: Kozhikode

Government
  - Type: Panchyath

Population (2011)
  - Total: 25,979

Languages
  - Official: Malayalam, English
- Time zone: UTC+5:30 (IST)
- PIN: 673614
- Vehicle registration: KL-77(Perambra SRTO)
- Nearest city: Kozhikode
- Lok Sabha constituency: Kozhikode
- State legislative Assembly constituency: Balussery

Naduvannur is a Grama Panchayat and a census town in Kozhikode district in the state of Kerala, India. It lies at the center of the district. Naduvannur is part of Kozhikode Urban Agglomeration. The name Naduvannur denotes that it was the center of the territory of Kurumbranad. 'Nadu' means center, and ur (oor) means place.

Naduvannur is well connected with nearby towns. PUKC road ( SH38) connecting Puthiyangadi to Chovva passes through here. Regular bus services are available from Kozhikode, Perambra, Koyilandy, Balussery and Meppayur. Kozhikode is the nearest city. Other nearby towns include Koyilandy, Balussery and Perambra.

== Education ==
- Govt. higher secondary school Naduvannur
- Malabar ITI Naduvannur
- Naduvannur higher secondary school Vakayad
- Kavumthara AUP School
- Govt.Welfare LP school Kavil
- Karuvannur GUP school
- Naduvannur south AMUP school
- Elankamal AMLPS
- GMLPS Naduvannur
- Noorul Huda public school Naduvannur
- Mannankave ALPS
- Virtue public school
- Little Flower school Naduvannur

== Demographics ==
As of the 2011 Census of India, Naduvannur had a population of 25,979 with 12,260 males and 13,719 females.

== Transportation ==
Naduvannur village connects to other parts of India through Kozhikode and Koyilandy towns. The nearest airport is Kozhikode. The nearest railway station is at Koyiandy. State Highway 38 and State Highway 54 pass through Naduvannur, which starts from Puthiyangadi in Kozhikode and ends in Chovva in Kannur and Mananthavady in Wayanad respectively.

== Nearby Hospitals ==
- Malabar Medical College
- Naduvannur Metro Hospital
- Care and Cure

== See also ==
- Kottur
- Puthiyangadi
- Chengottukavu
- Arikkulam
- Balussery
- Chemancheri
- Kappad
- Atholi
- Ulliyeri
- Cheekilode
- Thalakkulathur
- Koyilandy
- Kozhikode
