= Nochad =

- Town
- Interactive map of Nochad
- Coordinates: 11°31′50″N 75°45′31″E
- Country: India
- State: Kerala
- District: Kozhikode

Area
  - Total: 23.64 km^{2} (9.13 sq mi)

Population (2011)
  - Total: 26,857
  - Density: 1,136/km^{2} (2,942/sq mi)

Languages
  - Official: Malayalam, English
- Time zone: UTC+5:30 (IST)
- PIN: 673614
- Vehicle registration: KL-77
- Nearest city: Kozhikode
- Lok Sabha constituency: Vatakara
- Vidhan Sabha constituency: Perambra

Nochad is a village in Kozhikode district in the state of Kerala, India. Nochad Grama panchayat office locatede Muliyangal.

Politics

The LDF has been continuously governing the Nochad Grama Panchayat for the past several years. The current Panchayat President is Ms. Shiji Kottarakkal, who was elected as the CPI(M) candidate.

== Demographics ==
As of 2011 India census, Nochad had a population of 26,857, with 12,815 males and 14,042 females.

== Location ==
It is well connected with Koyilandy, Meppayyur, Ulliyeri and Perambra, the main towns of the region, by road. The Kozhikode to Kannur State Highway passes through Velliyur, which is 2 km from Nochad. By air the nearest airport is Calicut International Airport and the nearest railway station is Koyilandy.

== Economy ==
The primary agricultural activities here include paddy, banana, and tapioca cultivation. Coconut farming is also a major source of income for the community. Many people from Nochad work abroad, and that is an alternate mode of income.

== Educational institutions ==
The biggest school here is Nochad Higher Secondary School.

== Villages and suburbs ==
- Chenoli
- Ancham Peedika
- Chathoth Thazhe
- Muliyangal
- Velliyoor
- Valiacode
- Chalikkara
- Kaithakkal

== Transportation ==
Nochad village connects to other parts of India through Koyilandy town. The nearest airports are at Kannur and Kozhikode. The nearest railway station is at Koyiandy. The national highway no.66 passes through Koyilandy and the northern stretch connects to Mangalore, Goa and Mumbai. The southern stretch connects to Cochin and Trivandrum. The eastern National Highway No.54 going through Kuttiady connects to Mananthavady, Mysore and Bangalore.

== Places of interest ==
- Chenoli mosque
- Kalpathoor temple
- Nochad temple
- Sree Muthappan Temple, Valoor
- Podiyath tharavadu
- Ellathu para temple, Chenoli
- Kalpathoor Vayanasala
- velliyoor bridge
- Keloth Ayyappa Temple, Nochad
- Nochad Narasimha Temple, Nochad

== See also ==
- Perambra
- Moodadi
- Chengottukavu
- Naduvannur
- Arikkulam
- Thikkodi
- Chemancheri
- Kappad
- Atholi
- Ulliyeri
- Cheekilode
- Koyilandy
