= Chengottukavu =

- village
- Location in Kerala, India Chengottukavu (India)
- Coordinates: 11.428950°N 75.702560°E
- Country: India
- State: Kerala
- District: Kozhikode

Population (2011)
  - Total: 26,791

Languages
  - Official: Malayalam, English
- Time zone: UTC+5:30 (IST)
- Vehicle registration: KL-56 (koyilandy)

Chengottukavu is a village in Kozhikode district in the state of Kerala, India.

== Railway Station ==
The nearest railway station is Chemanchery.

== Demographics ==
As of 2011 India census, Chengottukavu had a population of 26791 with 12446 males and 14345 females.

== Transportation ==
Chengottukavu connects to other parts of India through Koyilandy town. The nearest airports are at Kannur and Kozhikode. The nearest railway station is at Koyilandy. The national highway no.66 passes through Koyilandy and the northern stretch connects to Mangalore, Goa and Mumbai. The southern stretch connects to Cochin and Trivandrum. The eastern National Highway No.54 going through Kuttiady connects to Mananthavady, Mysore and Bangalore.

== See also ==
- Moodadi
- Naduvannur
- Arikkulam
- Thikkodi
- Chemancheri
- Kappad
- Atholi
- Ulliyeri
- Cheekilode
- Nochad
- Koyilandy
