= Thiruvangoor =

Village in Kerala, India

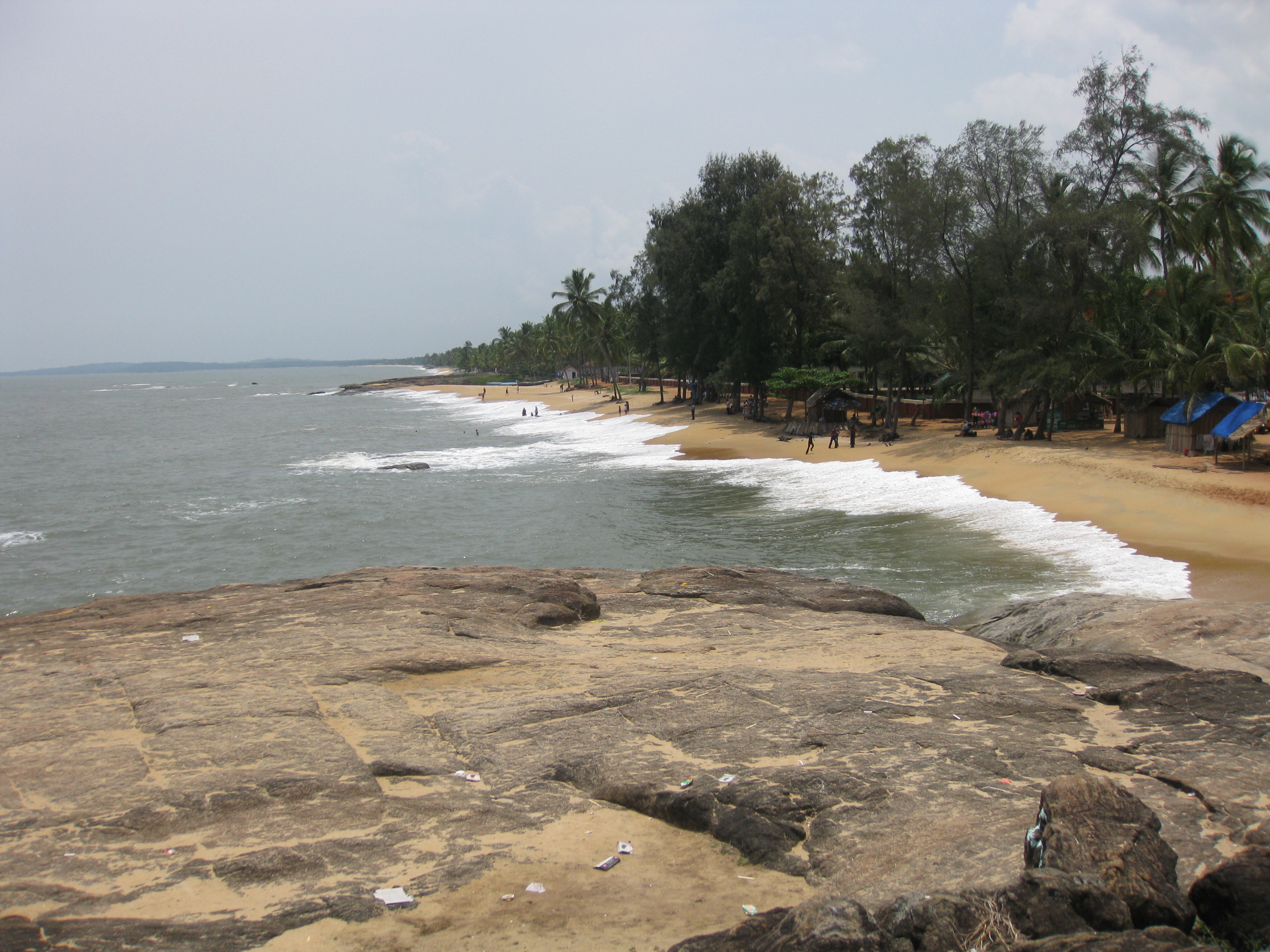
Kappad Beach

Thiruvangoor (തിരുവങ്ങൂർ) is a small village 16 kilometres (9.9 mi) away from Kozhikode, Kerala, India. It lies to the east of the Arabian Sea (Kappad) and west of Kuniyil Kadavu. Portuguese navigator Vasco de Gama is believed to have landed near Thiruvangoor, at Kappad, during one of his voyages, on 20 May 1498. Thiruvangoor lies on National highway 66.Nearby major towns are Atholi and Koyilandy. The Kuniyil Kadavu Bridge allows for transportation between Thiruvangoor and Atholi town.

== Education ==
Thiruvangoor Higher Secondary School is the village's largest educational facility. Thiruvangoor is part of the Chemancheri panchayat.

== Health ==
There is a community health centre adjacent to Thiruvangoor Higher Secondary School. There is a road to Kappad Beach just beyond the primary health centre, from the national highway.

== Transportation ==
Thiruvangoor connects to other parts of India through Kozhikode & Koyilandy town. The nearest airports are at Kozhikode and Kannur. The nearest railway station is at Koyilandy & Kozhikode railway station is 16 km away. National Highway 66 passes through Koyilandy, the northern stretch connecting to Mangalore, Goa and Mumbai. The southern stretch connects to Cochin and Trivandrum. The eastern part of National Highway 54 going through Kuttiady connects to Mananthavady, Mysore and Bangalore.

== Stats ==
- Locality Name : Thiruvangoor (തിരുവങ്ങൂർ )
- Block Name : Panthalayani
- District : Kozhikode
- State : Kerala
- Division : North Kerala
- Language : Malayalam and English, Hindi, Tamil
- Current Time 08:42 AM
- Date: Tuesday, Mar 23, 2021 (IST)
- Time zone: IST (UTC+5:30)
- Elevation / Altitude: 17 meters. Above Sea level
- Telephone Code / Std Code: 0496
- Assembly constituency : Quilandy assembly constituency
- Assembly MLA : k.dasan
- Lok Sabha constituency : Vatakara parliamentary constituency
- Parliament MP : K. MURALEEDHARAN
- Serpanch Name :
- Serpanch Name
- Pin Code : 673304
- Post Office Name : Chemancheri
- Main Village Name : Chemancheri
- Alternate Village Name : Thiruvangoor Colony, Thiruvangoor East
