= Atholi =

Atholi may refer to the following places in India:

- Atholi, Kerala, a town in Kerala
- Atholi, Kapurthala, a village in Punjab
- Atholi, Kishtwar, a village in the Paddar valley of Jammu and Kashmir
