= Chemancheri =

Chemanchery
- village
- Location in Kerala, India Chemanchery (India)
- Coordinates: 11.411590°N 75.734990°E
- Country: India
- State: Kerala
- District: Kozhikode

Population (2011)
  - Total: 34,819

Languages
  - Official: Malayalam, English
- Time zone: UTC+5:30 (IST)
- Vehicle registration: KL-

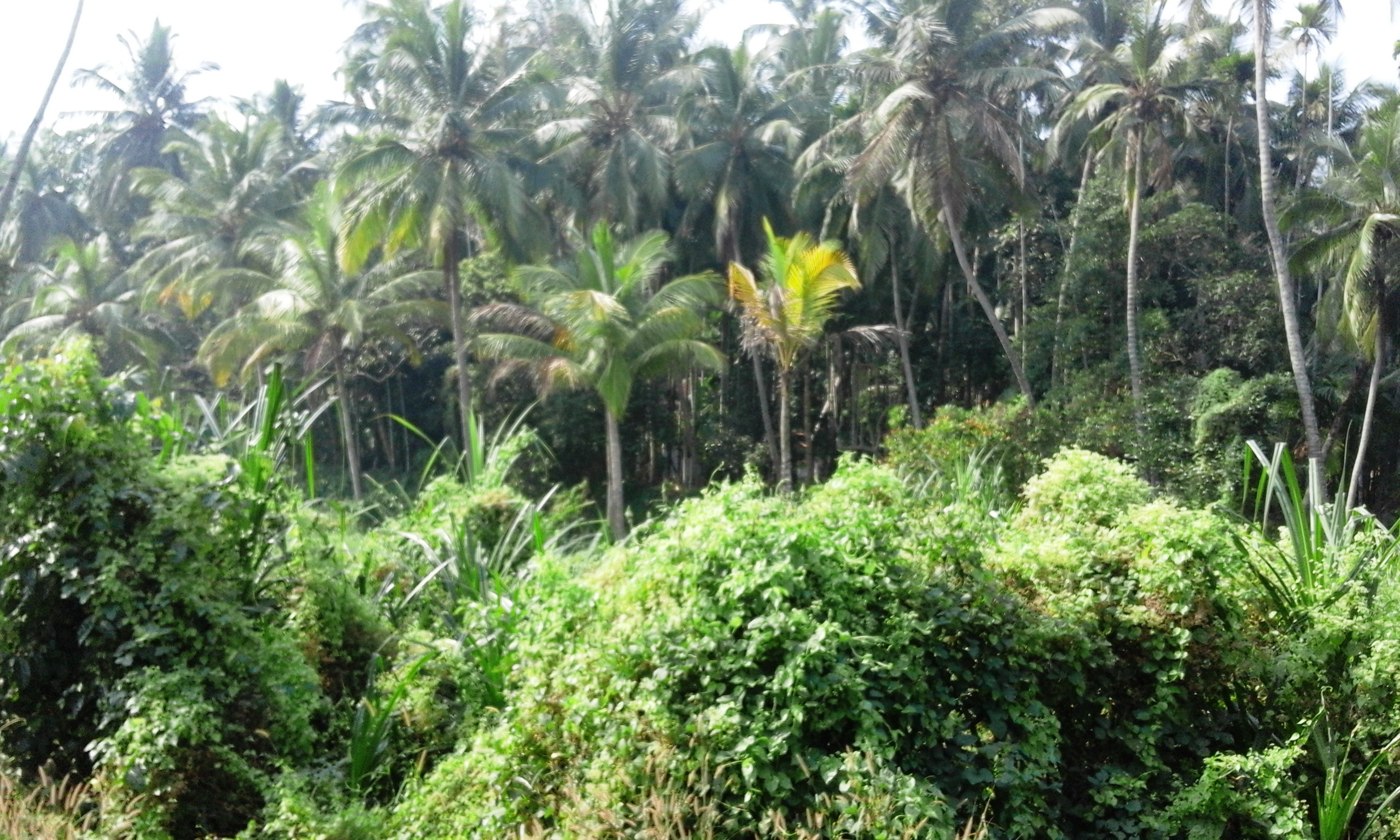
View from Chemanchery Railway Station

Chemanchery is a village in Kozhikode district in the state of Kerala, India.

== Demographics ==
As of 2011 India census, Chemancheri had a population of 34,819, with 16,112 males and 18,707 females.

== Chemancheri Kunhiraman Nair ==
Chemancheri Kunhiraman Nair was a renowned Kathakali artist from Chemancheri. He spent the last eighty years of his life learning and teaching Kathakali. He has performed the role of Krishna over a thousand times. The Government of India awarded him the fourth highest civilian honor, Padma Shri, in 2017.

== Transportation ==
Chemancheri village connects to other parts of India through Koyilandy town. The nearest airports are the Kannur and Kozhikode. The nearest railway station is the Chemancheri railway station and Koyilandy railway station. The National Highway 66 passes through Koyilandy and the northern stretch connects to Mangaluru, Panaji and Mumbai. The southern stretch connects to Kochi and Thiruvananthapuram before culminating in Kanyakumari. The National Highway 766 passing through Kozhikode connects Sultan Bathery, Mysore and Kollegal.

== See also ==
- Moodadi
- Chengottukavu
- Arikkulam
- Thikkodi
- Kappad
- Atholi
- Ulliyeri
- Cheekilode
- Nochad
- Koyilandy
- Chemancheri railway station
