= Uralloor =

- village
- Location in Kerala, India Uralloor (India)
- Coordinates: 11°29′0″N 75°45′0″E
- Country: India
- State: Kerala
- District: Kozhikode

Languages
  - Official: Malayalam, English
- Time zone: UTC+5:30 (IST)
- Postal code: 673620
- Vehicle registration: KL-56

Uralloor or Urallur is a village near Koyilandy in the Kozhikode district in Kerala state, India and is included in the Arikkulam Panchayath.
