= Kappad =

Kappad Kappakadavu
- beach and village
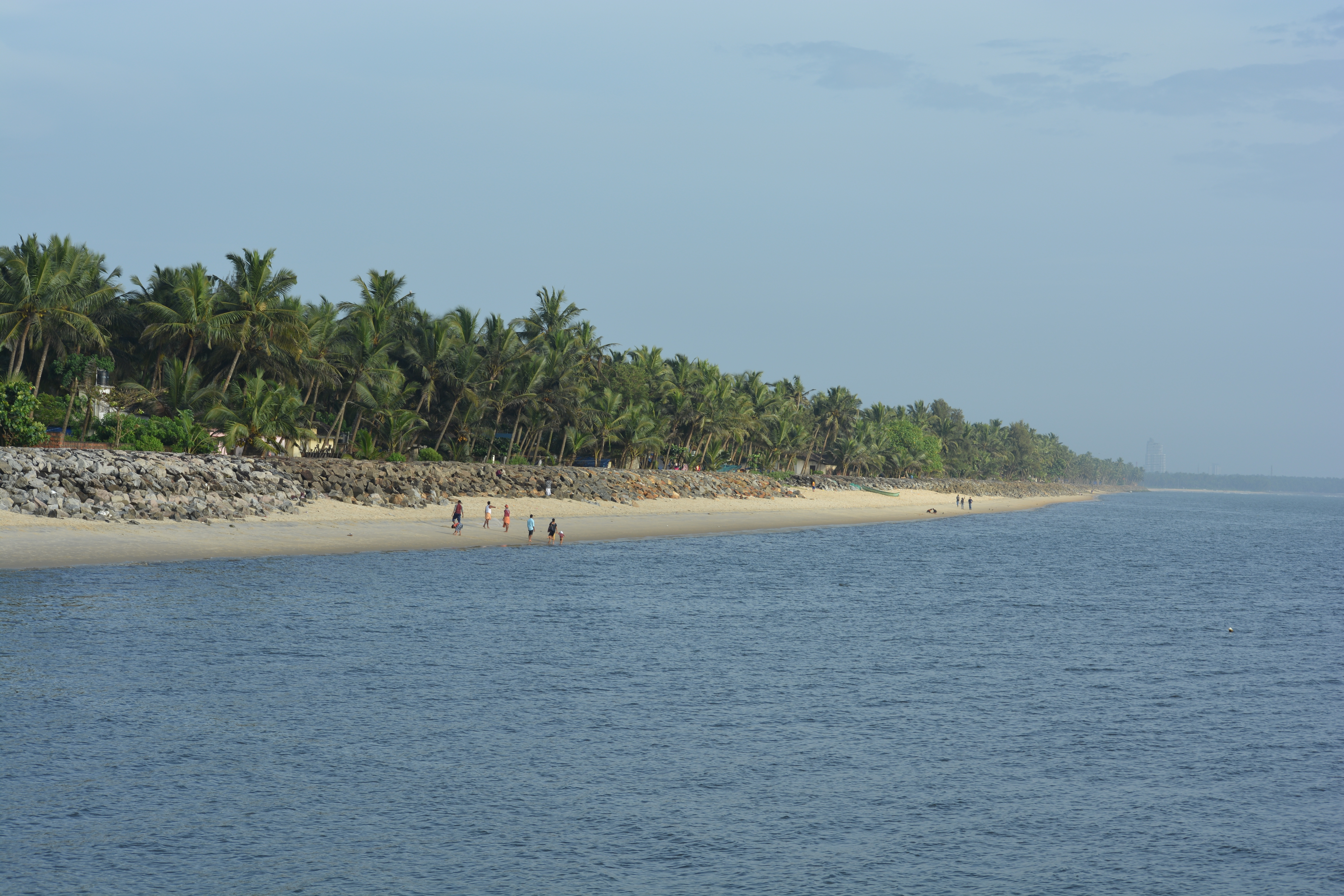
- Kappad beach
- Interactive map of Kappad
- Coordinates: 11°23′6″N 75°43′3″E
- Country: India
- State: Kerala
- District: Kozhikode
- Talukas: Koyilandy

Government
  - Body: Grama Panchayat

Languages
  - Official: Malayalam, and English
- Time zone: UTC+5:30 (IST)
- PIN: 673304
- Telephone code: 91496
- ISO 3166 code: IN-KL

Kappad (Note: or Kappakadavu locally, Malayalam: [kaːpːaːɖə̆, kɐpːɐ(l)kːɐɖɐʋə̆]) is a beach and village near Koyilandy, in the Kozhikode district, Kerala, India.

"No one has tried to clear that misconception [that Vasco da Gama landed at Kappad]. The government has even installed a memorial stone at the Kappad beach. Actually [Vasco da] Gama landed at Panthalayini (Koyilandy) in the [Kozhikode] district because there was a port there and Kozhikode did not have one. It does not have a port even now."

— M. G. S. Narayanan

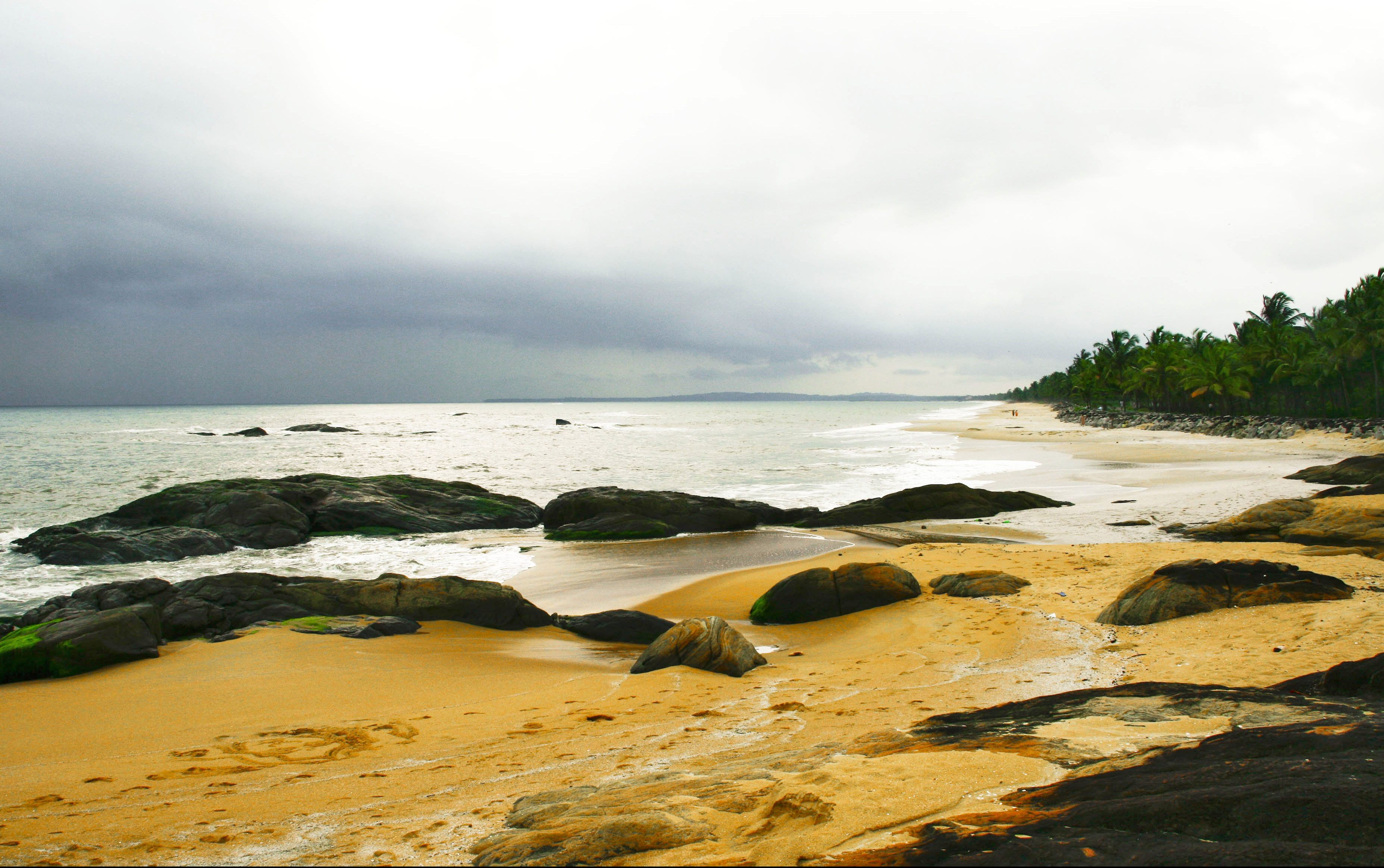
Kappakkadavu

A stone monument installed by government commemorates the "landing" by Vasco da Gama with the inscription, 'Vasco da Gama landed here, Kappakadavu, in the year 1498'.

In 2007 a Rs. 1.5 crore program to beautify the beach was launched by [Kerala] Tourism Minister Kodiyeri Balakrishnan. It is now completed and Kappad beach has a corniche and park. The park includes a restroom, restaurant and seating.

The nearest major railway station is Koyilandy, about 10 km away from Kappad. The nearest airport is Calicut International Airport (CCJ), which is about 25 km from the town of Kozhikode. Private transport buses are available from the main bus stand, or visitors can reach the beach by stopping at Thiruvangoor on National Highway 66 between Kozhikode and Vadakara. It is a Blue Flag beach.

== See also ==
- Bekal beach
- Kozhikode Beach
- Moodadi
- Chengottukavu
- Arikkulam
- Thikkodi
- Chemancheri
- Atholi
- Ulliyeri
- Cheekilode
- Nochad
- Koyilandy
- Chemancheri railway station
