= K. Kelappan =

Indian politician, reformer, and freedom fighter, writer

Kerala Gandhi K. Kelappan
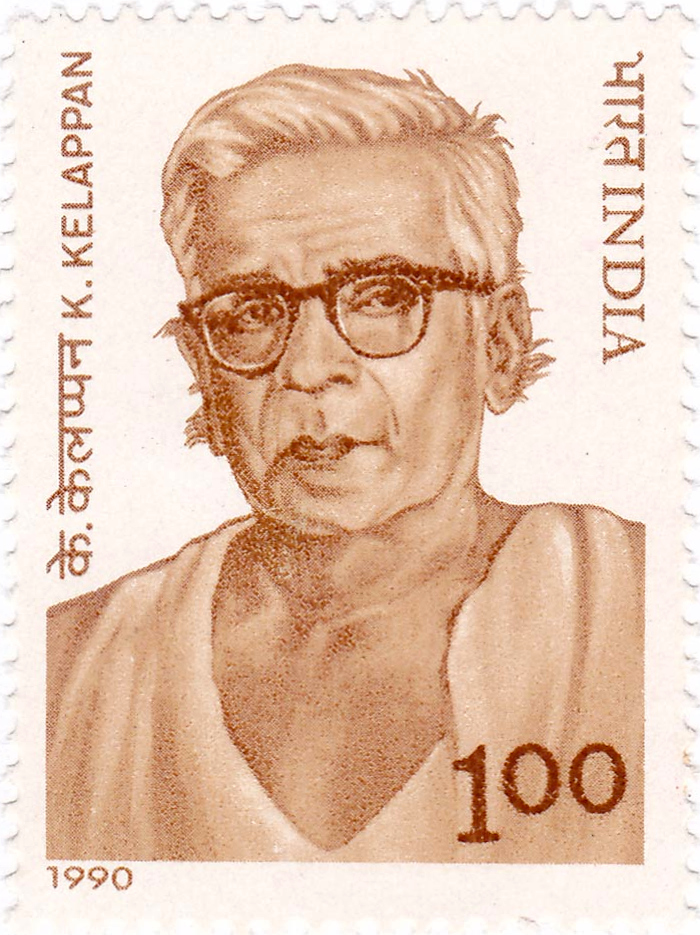

Member of Parliament, Lok Sabha
- In office 1952 – 1957
- Preceded by: Vella Eacharan
- Succeeded by: E. K. Imbichi Bava
- Constituency: Ponnani, Madras State

President, Kerala Pradesh Congress Committee
- In office 1946 – 1949
- Preceded by: P. K. Moideen Kutty Sahib
- Succeeded by: Kumbalathu Sanku Pillai

President, Nair Service Society
- In office 1914–1920
- Preceded by: Office created
- Succeeded by: Changanassery Parameswaran Pillai

Personal details
- Born: Koyapalli Kelappan Nair; 24 August 1889 Muchukunnu, Koyilandy, Malabar (present-day Kozhikode, Kerala)
- Died: 7 October 1971 (aged 82) Kozhikode, Kerala
- Spouse: T. P. Lakshmi Amma
- Children: T. P. K. Kidavu
- Parents: T. Kanaran Nair (father); K. Kunjamma (mother)
- Education: Graduate
- Alma mater: University of Madras
- Occupation: Freedom Fighter, Politician, Renaissance leader, Teacher, Editor and Founder President of Nair Service Society
- Known for: Indian independence movement

Koyapalli Kelappan Nair (24 August 1889 – 7 October 1971), better known as K. Kelappan was an Indian politician, independence activist, educationist and journalist. During the Indian independence movement, he was the lead figure of Indian National Congress in Kerala and was popularly known as Kerala Gandhi. After Indian independence, he held various seats in Gandhian organisations. He was the co-founder and the first president of the Nair Service Society and was also the founder of Kerala Kshetra Samrakshana Samiti (Temple Protection Movement).

== Early life ==
Kelappan was born in the small village of Muchukunnu at Koyilandy in Kozhikode, Kerala as the son of Thenpoyil Kanaran Nair, a Clerk at Court and Koyapalli Kunjamma. Kelappan got his family name, Koyapalli, through matrilineal succession.

He studied in Kozhikode and Madras and graduated from the University of Madras before starting his career as a teacher at St. Berchmans High School, Changanassery. Kelappan was the founding President of the Nair Service Society and later became the principal of a school run by the society.

== As reformer ==
He fought for social reforms on one hand and the British on the other. He fought relentlessly against untouchability and caste-based discrimination. Along with K. Kumar and K. Madhavanar, he became the earliest in Kerala to remove the suffix to his name that implied caste-status. He was called Kerala Gandhi.

Kelappan laboured incessantly for the equality of all sections of the people. He was a major influence on the Vaikom Satyagraha movement and later led the Guruvayur Satyagraha in 1932. During Gandhi's visit to Travancore to commemorate the Temple Entry Proclamation, he seconded the most critical resolution re-establishing faith in Gandhiji's leadership and the forward steps to be taken in conformity with the Gandhian approach to translate the spirit of the move for social equality. The resolution was presented by K. Kumar of Travancore, a veteran reformer and one of the leaders of the Vaikom Satyagraha who later came to be forgotten by people and historians.

== Role post independence ==
After independence he left the Congress Party. He joined the Kisan Mazdoor Praja Party and was elected to Parliament from the Ponnani Lok Sabha seat in 1952. At the end of his term, he left active politics and became a Sarvodaya worker and was actively associated with Bhoodan Movement in Kerala.

Kelappan helped in starting Mathrubhumi and was its editor for several years. He worked for the unification of Kerala into a new linguistic state. He was also the president of many Gandhian organisations in Kerala including Kerala Sarvodaya Sangh, Kerala Gandhi Smarak Nidhi, Kerala Sarvodaya Mandal, and Gandhi Peace Foundation, Calicut.

Kelappan opposed the formation of Muslim-majority Malappuram District in Kerala arguing that it would create a 'mini Pakistan'. He played an instrumental role in the Tali Temple Movement, which sought to rebuild a temple near a mosque in Angadippuram, Malappuram, an initiative that sparked communal tensions. However, he died on 7 October 1971, before the movement was completed. The temple built with his support stands alongside the mosque, symbolising harmony among different communities.

== Awards and recognition ==
In his honour India Post released a Commemorative stamp in 1990.
