= Muchukunnu =

- village
- Location in Kerala, India Muchukunnu (India)
- Coordinates: 11°29′20″N 75°40′10″E
- Country: India
- State: Kerala
- District: Kozhikode

Languages
  - Official: Malayalam, English
- Time zone: UTC+5:30 (IST)
- PIN: 673307
- Telephone code: 0496-
- Vehicle registration: KL-56
- Nearest city: Koyilandy
- Lok Sabha constituency: Vatakara

Muchukunnu is a small village on the Malabar Coast of south-western India.

== Celebrities ==
Politician and independence activist Koyapalli Kelappaji, also known as Kerala Gandhi, was born here.

== Clay works ==
A traditional art is the creation of clay pots, which clay workers practice in their houses. A tile factory and training institute for clay workers is also established in Muchukunnu.

== Tourism ==
Akalappuzha and 'Thuruthi'(island) are noted tourist attractions of this village. Kottayail Siva Kshethram (Temple) and vazhayil bagavathi temple also attracts many tourists. Koyilothum pady sree paradevada (Temple) also attracts tourists.

== Important temples ==
Kottayil Shiva temple and vazhayil bagavathi temple. Vazhayil bagavathi temple has situated in hill area and most famous festival started here in February middle (Malayalam kalander kumbam 8,9,10 th ) .

== Koyilandy Hookahs ==
World-famous Koyilandy hookahs (Arabic hookka) are also made here, with coconut shell and Chinese clay.

== Transportation ==
Muchukunnu village connects to other parts of India through Koyilandy town. The nearest airports are at Kannur and Kozhikode. The nearest railway station is at Koyiandy. The national highway no.66 passes through Koyilandy and the northern stretch connects to Mangalore, Goa and Mumbai. The southern stretch connects to Cochin and Trivandrum. The eastern National Highway No.54 going through Kuttiady connects to Mananthavady, Mysore and Bangalore.
