= K Madhavanar =

First Malayalam translator of Gandhi's autobiography

Koothirezhi Madhavan Nair (1903–1980), popularly known as K. Madhavanar, was an Indian freedom fighter from Kerala and the first Malayalam translator of Mahatma Gandhi's autobiography 'The Story of My Experiments with Truth". He worked as an editor with the Mathrubhumi Daily and was a social reformer. Gandhiji used to write letters to Madhavanar in connection with the freedom movement. He also penned the first Himalaya travelogue in Malayalam titled Oru Himalaya Yathra. Madhavanar was the first secretary of the Kerala Pradesh Congress Committee (KPCC).

== Early life ==
Madhavanar was born to Korath Velayudha Menon and Koothirezhi Lakshmikutty Amma of Vallikkunnu, Malappuram in 1903. He attended the Ganapath School in Feroke. After earning his BA in chemistry from Madras University, he joined the Tata Iron and Steel Company (TISCO) in Jamshedpur as a scientist. During his stint at TISCO, he travelled to the Himalayas. His travel memories were later published as a travelogue - Oru Himalaya Yathra.

== Social reformer ==
Madhavanar once invited a Dalit boy to the Koothirezhi tharavadu, which was considered a brave act then. He also participated in the Guruvayur Satyagraha led by K Kelappan, demanding temple entry rights for backward classes and Dalits. He dropped his caste surname as a symbolic protest against casteism.

== Indian freedom movement ==
Madhavanar actively participated in the Beypore and Kozhikode Salt Satyagrahas. He served as the Secretary of the Kerala Pradesh Congress Committee. He used to regularly participate in the All India Congress Committee meetings, which helped form a camaraderie with Gandhiji. The Mahatma used to write letters to Madhavanar pertaining to the freedom movement. He translated Gandhiji's autobiography 'The Story of My Experiments with Truth' to Malayalam which was serialized in the Mathrubhumi Weekly. Later it was published in book form by Mathrubhumi. Madhavanar was a close associate of C Rajagopalachari. Madhavanar co-ordinated the first visit of Jawaharlal Nehru to Kerala.

== Editor at Mathrubhumi Daily ==
Madhavanar served on the editorial board of Mathrubhumi for more than three decades. He joined the newspaper in 1931 as a sub editor and retired as an assistant editor. Madhavanar maintained close contact with acclaimed writers like SK Pottekkad and Thikkodian. He was instrumental in introducing EMS Namboothiripad to the AICC. AK Gopalan mentioned him in his autobiography.

== Gandhi translator ==
Madhavanar translated the autobiography of Mahatma Gandhi 'The Story of My Experiments with Truth' into Malayalam. First serialised in the Mathrubhumi Weekly, Ente Sathyanweshana Pareekshakal was launched as a book later.

== Personal life ==
Madhavanar was a chronic bachelor. A voracious reader, he devoted his twilight years to books.

== Memorial ==
46 years after his passing, Jwala Library of Vallikkunnu has built a memorial building to honour him.
