= Atholi, Kapurthala =

Coordinates: 31.228°N 75.719°E

Atholi
- Village
- Location in Punjab, India Atholi (India)
- Country: India
- State: Punjab
- District: Kapurthala
- Tehsil: Phagwara

Government
  - Type: Panchayat raj
  - Body: Gram panchayat

Area
  - Total: 244 ha (600 acres)

Population (2011)
  - Total: 1,342; 705/637 ♂/♀
  - Scheduled Castes: 547; 287/260 ♂/♀
  - Total Households: 287

Languages
  - Official: Punjabi
- Time zone: UTC+5:30 (IST)
- ISO 3166 code: IN-PB
- Website: kapurthala.gov.in

Atholi is a village in Phagwara in Kapurthala district of Punjab State, India. It is located 5 kilometres (3.1 mi) from the sub-district headquarters and 45 kilometres (28 mi) from the district headquarters. The village is administered by a sarpanch, an elected representative of the village.

== Demography ==
In 2011, the village had 287 houses and a population of 1,342 (705 males, 637 females). According to the report published by Census India in 2011, of the population of the village, 547 were from Scheduled Caste and the village did not have any Scheduled Tribe population.

== See also ==
- List of villages in India
