= Changaroth =

- village
- Location in Kerala, India Changaroth (India)
- Coordinates: 11.6170200°N 75.781020°E
- Country: India
- State: Kerala
- District: Kozhikode

Population (2011)
  - Total: 17,427

Languages
  - Official: Malayalam, English
- Time zone: UTC+5:30 (IST)
- Vehicle registration: KL-

Changaroth is a village in Kozhikode district in the state of Kerala, India.

== Demographics ==
As of 2011 India census, Changaroth had a population of 17,427, with 8,369 males and 9,058 females.

== Transportation ==
Changaroth connects to other parts of India through Koyilandy town. The nearby airports are at Kannur and Kozhikode, and the nearest railway station is at Koyiandy. The National Highway No. 66 passes through Koyilandy, and the northern stretch connects to Mangalore, Goa, and Mumbai. The southern stretch connects to Cochin and Trivandrum. The Eastern National Highway No. 54 passing through Kuttiady connects to Mananthavady, Mysore, and Bangalore.
