= Kozhukkallur =

- village
- Location in Kerala, India Kozhukkallur (India)
- Coordinates: 11°31′30″N 75°41′45″E
- Country: India
- State: Kerala
- District: Kozhikode

Population (2011)
  - Total: 14,007

Languages
  - Official: Malayalam, English
- Time zone: UTC+5:30 (IST)
- Vehicle registration: KL-

Kozhukkallur is a village in Kozhikode district in the state of Kerala, India.

== Demographics ==
As of the 2011 India census, Kozhukkallur had a population of 14,007 with 6,570 males and 7,437 females.

== Transportation ==
Kozhukkallur connects to other parts of India through Koyilandy town. The nearest airports are at Kannur and Kozhikode. The nearest railway station is at Koyiandy. The national highway No.66 passes through Koyilandy and the northern stretch connects to Mangalore, Goa and Mumbai. The southern stretch connects to Cochin and Trivandrum. The eastern National Highway No.54 going through Kuttiady connects to Mananthavady, Mysore and Bangalore.
