= Thurayur =

Thurayur Earlier Payyoli
- village
- Location in Kerala, India Thurayur (India)
- Coordinates: 11°31′0″N 75°39′0″E
- Country: India
- State: Kerala

Government
  - Type: Panchayati raj (India)
  - Body: Gram panchayat

Population (2011)
  - Total: 14,176

Languages
  - Official: Malayalam, English
- Time zone: UTC+5:30 (IST)
- PIN: 6XXXXX
- Vehicle registration: KL-

Thurayur is a village in Kozhikode district in the state of Kerala, India.

== Demographics ==
At the 2011 India census, Thurayur had a population of 14176 with 6531 males and 7645 females.

== Transportation ==
Thurayur village connects to other parts of India through Koyilandy town, and vatakara town. The nearest airports are at Kannur and Kozhikode. The nearest railway station is at Payyoli. It is a small village surrounded by water in all the sides. the northern border is the Kuttiady river flowing from the western ghats to the Arabian sea. The southern side is Akalappuzha backwaters, a beautiful natural area to be visited. The village is a part of Old Payyormala. The bungalow of British rulers is still alive in this village alongside of the Kuttiady river. The Kanoli canal joins at Kuttiady river at this small town, and by this another name was also given to this small town that is 'Payyoli Cheerpp'.
