= Menhaniam =

- village
- Interactive map of Menhaniam
- Country: India
- State: Kerala
- District: Kozhikode

Population (2011)
  - Total: 15,768

Languages
  - Official: Malayalam, English
- Time zone: UTC+5:30 (IST)
- Vehicle registration: KL-

Menhaniam is a village in Kozhikode district in the state of Kerala, India.

== Demographics ==
As of 2011 India census, Menhaniam had a population of 15768 with 7450 males and 8318 females.

== Transportation ==
Menhaniam village connects to other parts of India through Perambra town. The nearest airports are at Kannur and Kozhikode. The nearest railway station is at Koyiandy. The national highway no.66 passes through Koyilandy and the northern stretch connects to Mangalore, Goa and Mumbai. The southern stretch connects to Cochin and Trivandrum.
