= Malabar Coast =

Southwestern coast of India

- Region
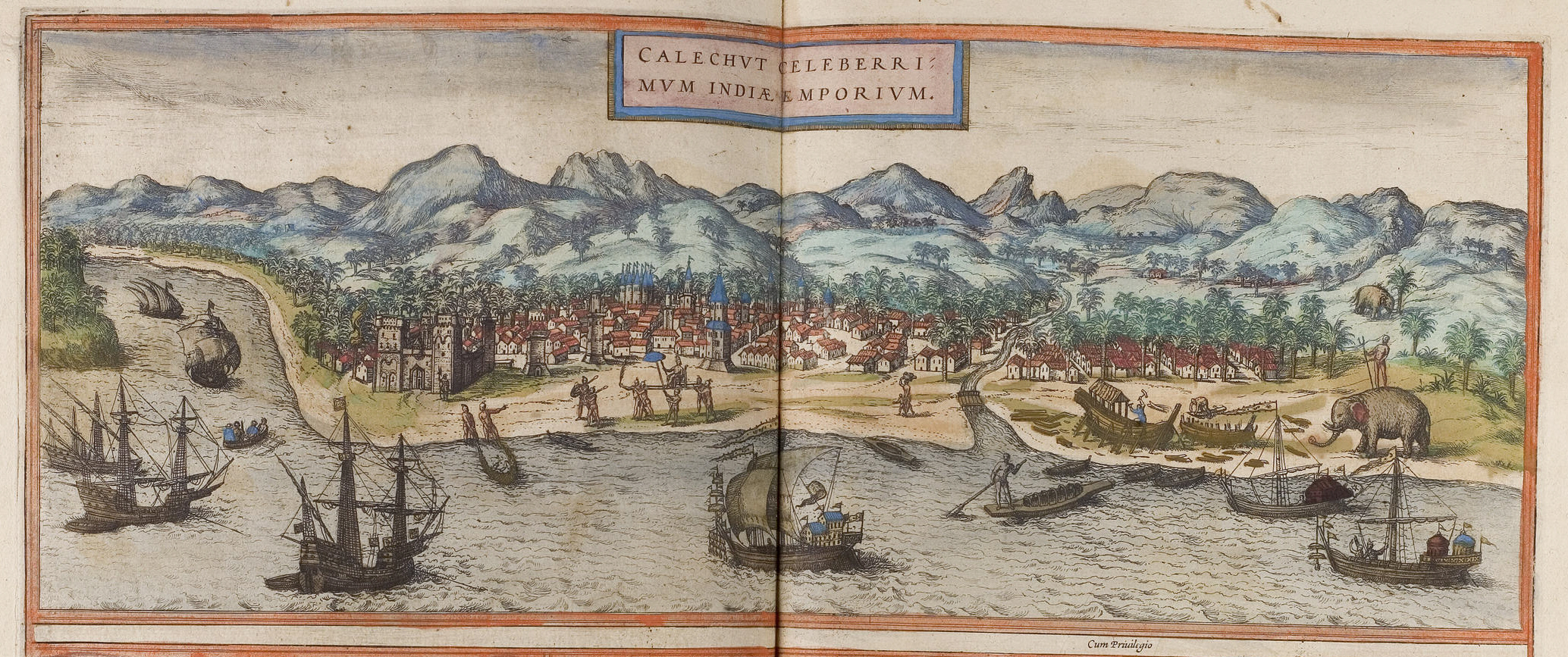
- Calicut coast 1572, painting by Georg Braun
- Nicknames: Maritime Gateway of India, Spice Garden of India
- Map showing the Malabar Coast
- Coordinates: 12.0167°N 75.2833°E
- Country: India
- State: Kerala, Karnataka
  - Density: 816/km^{2} (2,110/sq mi)

Languages
  - Official: Konkani, Malayalam, Tulu, Kannada, English
- Time zone: UTC+5:30 (IST)
- ISO 3166 code: IN-KL, IN-TN, IN-PY and IN-KA
- No. of districts: 14 (9 in Kerala, 3 in Karnataka, 1 in Puducherry (union territory) and 1 in Tamil Nadu)
- Climate: Tropical (Köppen)

The Malabar Coast (Malayalam: [mɐlɐbaːr]) is the southwestern region of the Indian subcontinent. It generally refers to the western coastline of India covering from Kerala and parts of Karnataka. Geographically, it comprises one of the wettest regions of the subcontinent, which includes the southern coastal region of Karnataka, and all of Kerala.

Kuttanad, which is the point of the lowest elevation in India, lies on the Malabar Coast. Kuttanad, also known as "the Rice Bowl of Kerala", is among the few places in the world where cultivation takes place below sea level. The peak of Anamudi, which is also the point of highest elevation in India outside the Himalayas, lies parallel to the Malabar Coast on the Western Ghats.

The region parallel to the Malabar Coast gently slopes from the eastern highland of Western Ghats ranges to the western coastal lowland. The moisture-laden winds of the Southwest monsoon, on reaching the southernmost point of the Indian subcontinent, because of its topography, divide into two branches; the "Arabian Sea Branch" and the "Bay of Bengal Branch". The "Arabian Sea Branch" of the Southwest monsoon first hits the Western Ghats, making Kerala the first state in India to receive rain from the Southwest monsoon. The Malabar Coast is a source of biodiversity in India.

== Etymology ==
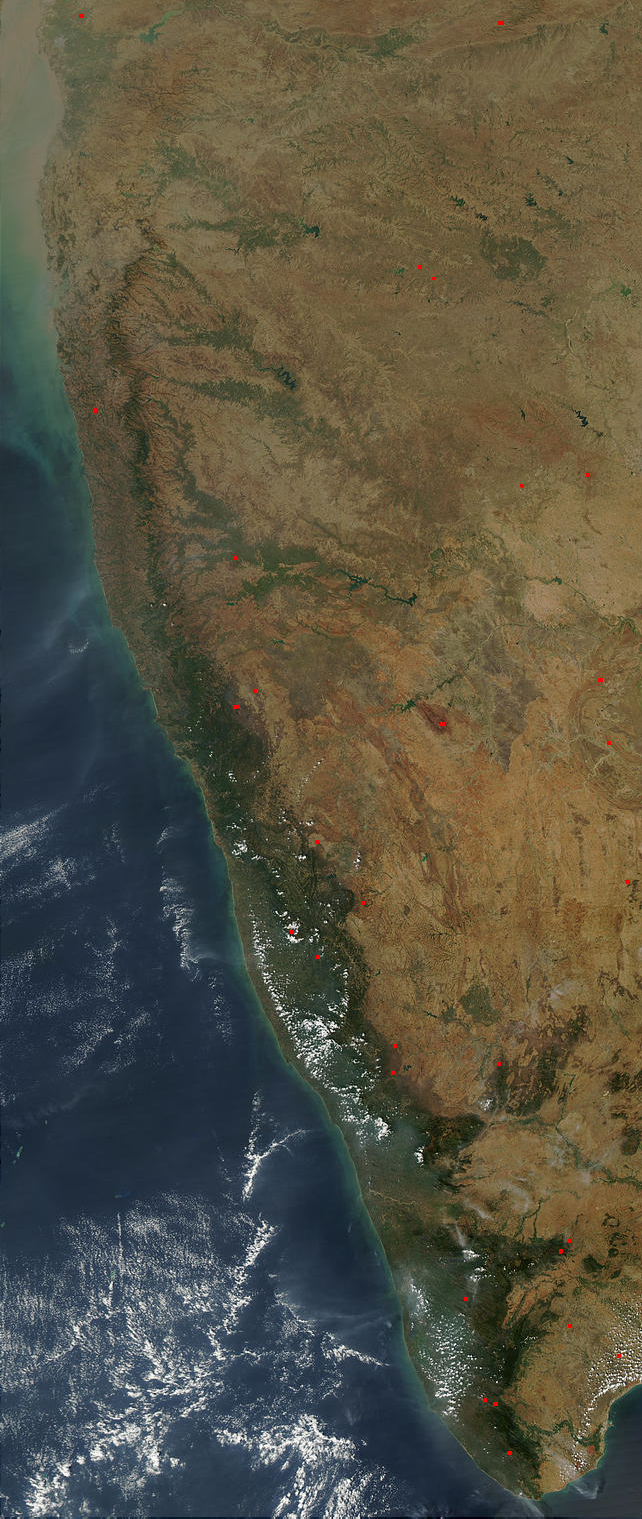
The Western Ghats lie roughly parallel to the southwestern Malabar coast of India.

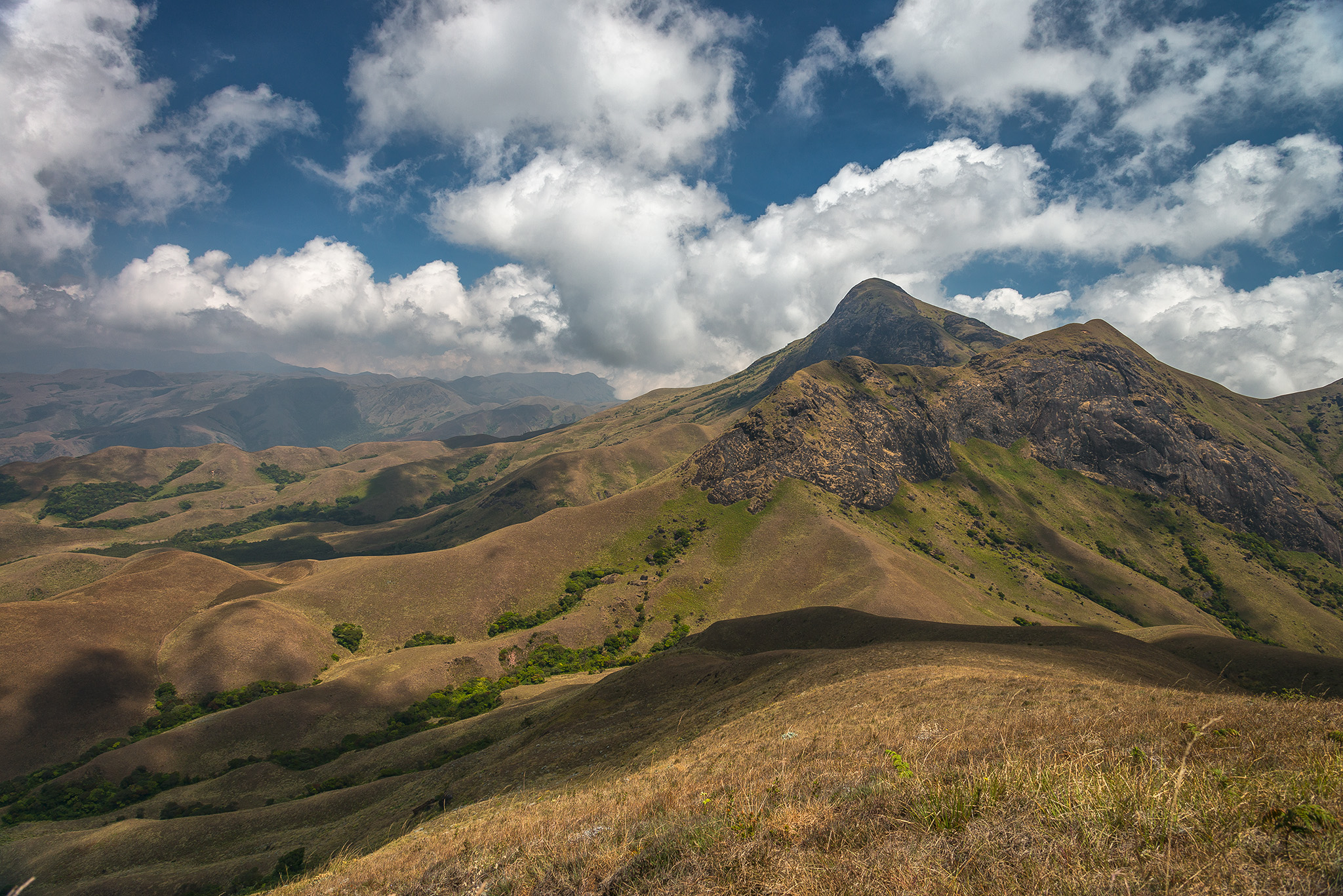
Anamudi, the highest peak in India outside the Himalayas, lies parallel to the Malabar Coast, in Western Ghats.

Malabar is reminiscent of the word Malanad or Malavaram in Malayalam, which means the land of mountains. The earliest recorded use of 'Malabar' is by Al-Biruni (AD 973–1048), though the name had already been in use much earlier. Authors such as Ibn Khordadbeh and Al-Baladhuri mention Malabar ports in their works. According to William Logan, the word Malabar comes from a combination of the Dravidian word Mala (mountain) and the Persian/Arabic word Barr (country/continent). The first element of the name is first attested in the Topography written by Cosmas Indicopleustes (6th century CE), which indicates that Arab sailors already call Kerala Male at that time. The Topography mentions a pepper emporium called Male, which clearly gave its name to Malabar ('the country of Male'). The second part of the name is thought by scholars to be the Arabic word barr ('continent') or its Persian relative bar ('country').

Until the arrival of the British, the term Malabar was used in foreign trade circles as a general name for Kerala. Earlier, the term Malabar had also been used to denote Tulu Nadu and Kanyakumari, which lie contiguous to Kerala in the southwestern coast of India, in addition to the modern state of Kerala. The people of Malabar were known as Malabars. The term Malabar is often used to denote the entire southwestern coast of India.

Additionally, European traders and scholars referred to Tamils of Sri Lanka as Malabars. In the 18th century, J. P. Fabricius described his Tamil-English Dictionary as the "Dictionary of Malabar and English".

== Definitions ==
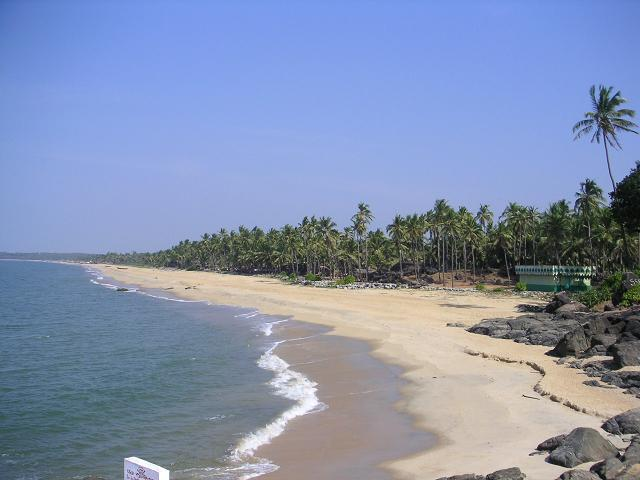
Bekal Fort Beach in Kerala

The term Malabar Coast, in historical contexts, refers to India's southwestern coast, which lies on the narrow coastal plain of Karnataka and Kerala between the Western Ghats range and the Arabian Sea. The coast runs from south of Goa to Kanyakumari on India's southern tip. India's southeastern coast is called the Coromandel Coast.

In ancient times the term Malabar was used to denote the entire south-western coast of the Indian peninsula. The region formed part of the ancient kingdom of Chera until the early 12th century. Following the breakup of the Chera Kingdom, the chieftains of the region proclaimed their independence. Notable among these were the Zamorins of Kozhikode, Kolathunadu, Perumbadappu Swaroopam, Venad, Kingdom of Valluvanad of Kingdom of Valluvanad.

The name Malabar Coast is sometimes used as an all-encompassing term for the entire Indian coast from Konkan to the tip of the subcontinent at Kanyakumari. It stretches approximately 845 kilometers (525 miles) along the southwestern coast of India. It extends from the southern tip of Goa to Kanyakumari, encompassing the coastal regions of Karnataka and Kerala. It is flanked by the Arabian Sea on the west and the Western Ghats on the east. The southern part of this narrow coast is referred to as the South Western Ghats moist deciduous forests.

Malabar is also used by ecologists to refer to the Tropical and subtropical moist broadleaf forests of southwestern India (present-day Kerala).

== Geography ==
Geographically, the Malabar Coast can be divided into three climatically distinct regions: the eastern highlands; rugged and cool mountainous terrain, the central mid-lands; rolling hills, and the western lowlands; coastal plains.

The Western Ghats mountain range lie parallel to the coast on the eastern highland and separate the plains from the Deccan Plateau. These mountains are recognised as one of the world's eight "hottest hotspots" of biological diversity and are listed among UNESCO World Heritage Sites. The peak of Anamudi in Kerala, at an elevation of 2,695 m (8,842 ft), is the highest peak in India outside the Himalayas. The chain's forests are considered to be older than the Himalaya mountains.

Malabar's western coastal belt is relatively flat compared to the eastern region, and is criss-crossed by a network of interconnected brackish canals, lakes, estuaries, and rivers known as the Kerala Backwaters. The Kuttanad region, also known as The Rice Bowl of Kerala, has the lowest altitude in India. The country's longest lake Vembanad, dominates the backwaters; it lies between Alappuzha and Kochi and is about 200 km^{2} (77 sq mi) in area. Around eight percent of India's waterways are found in Kerala.

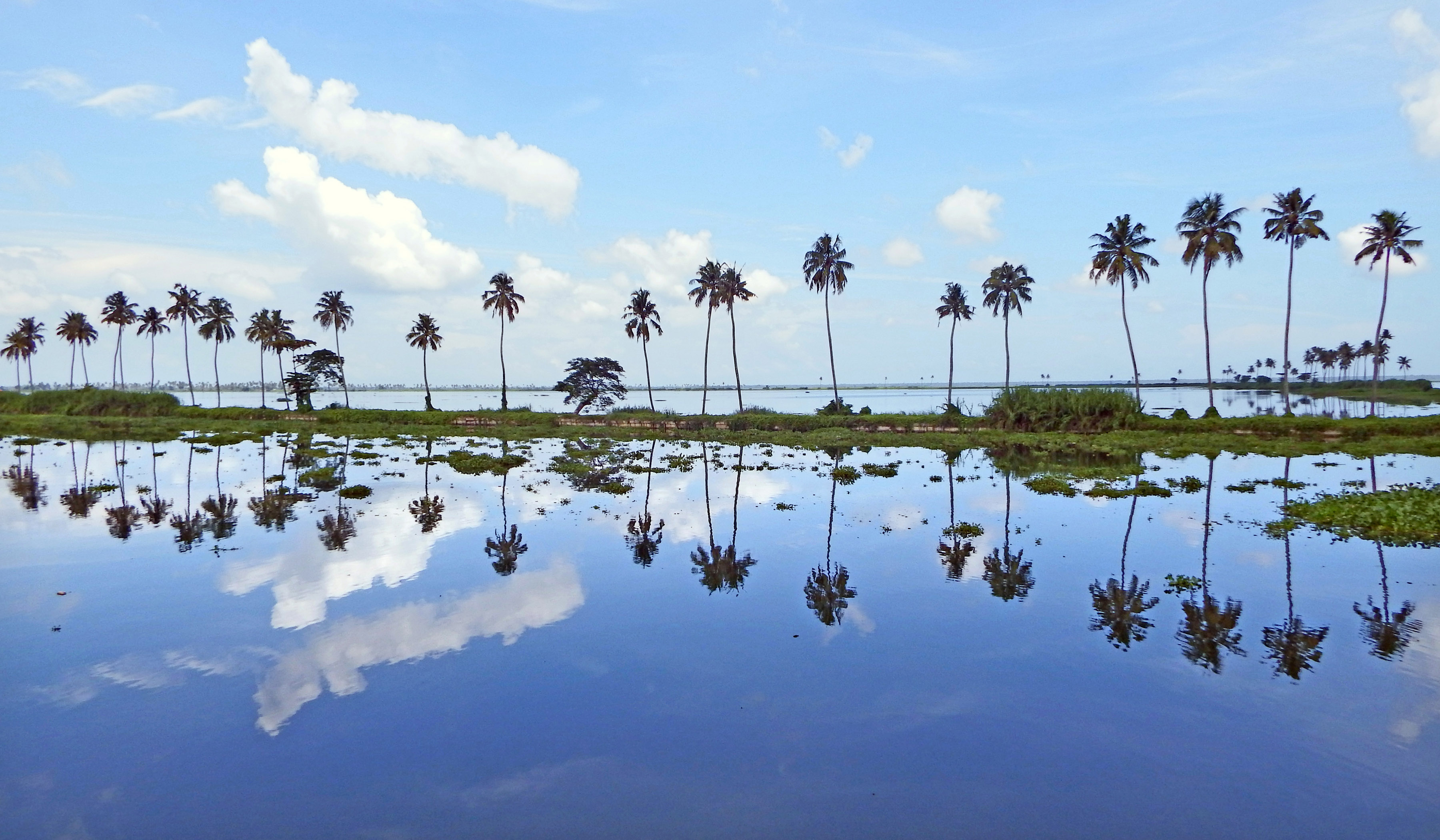
Vembanad, the largest lake in India, is a portion of the Kerala Backwaters.

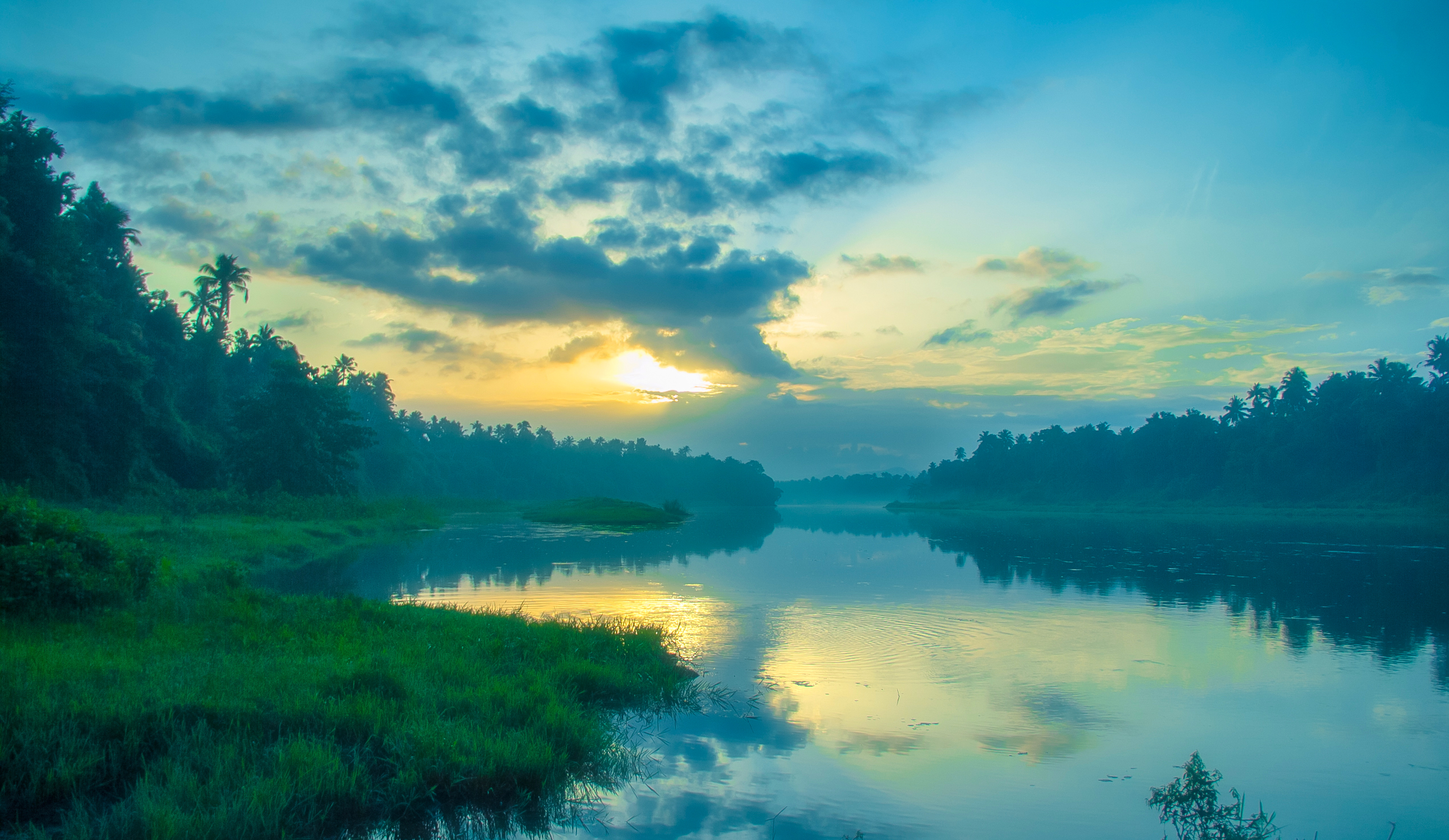
The Athirappilly Falls is located on Chalakudy River.

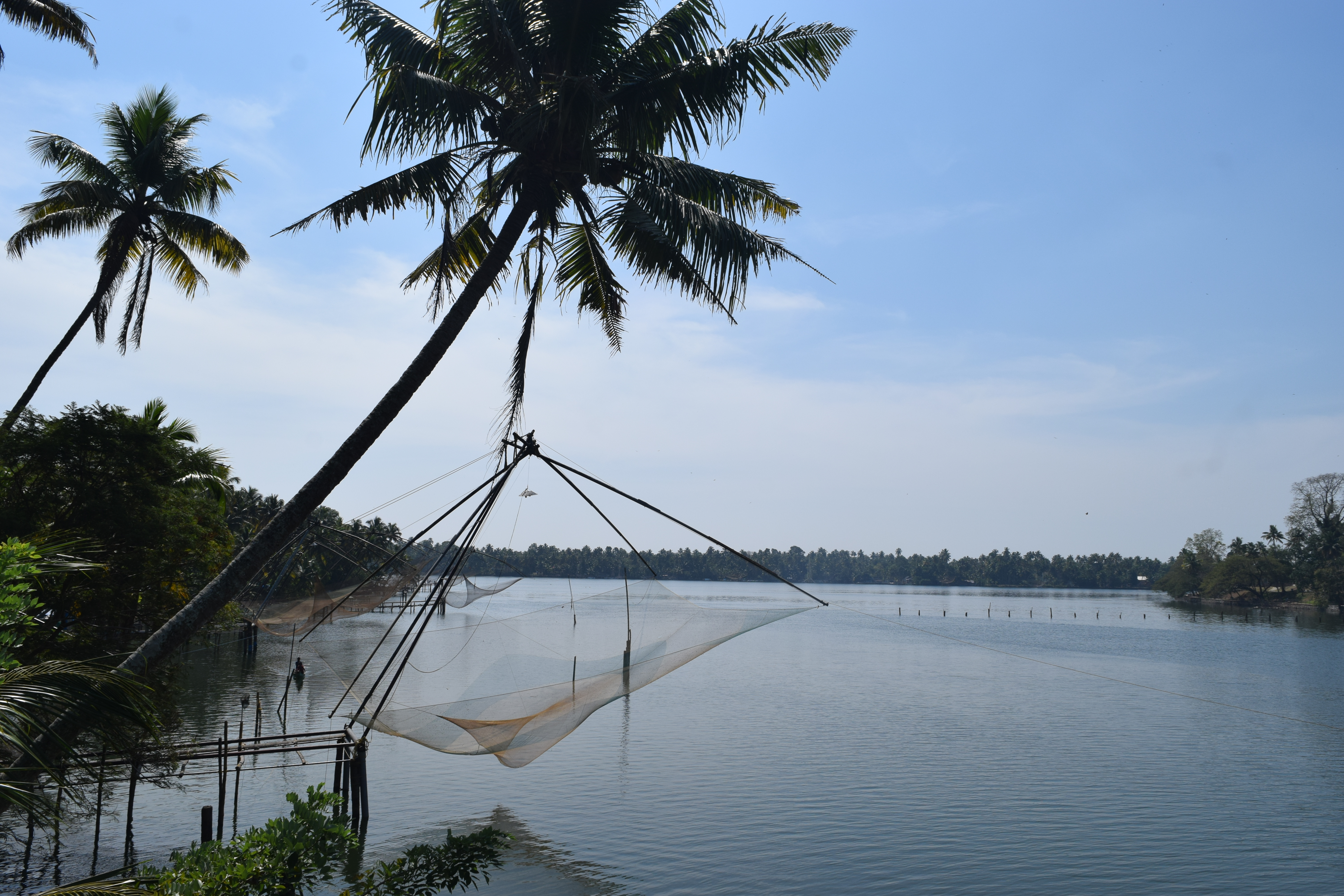
Periyar, the longest river of Kerala

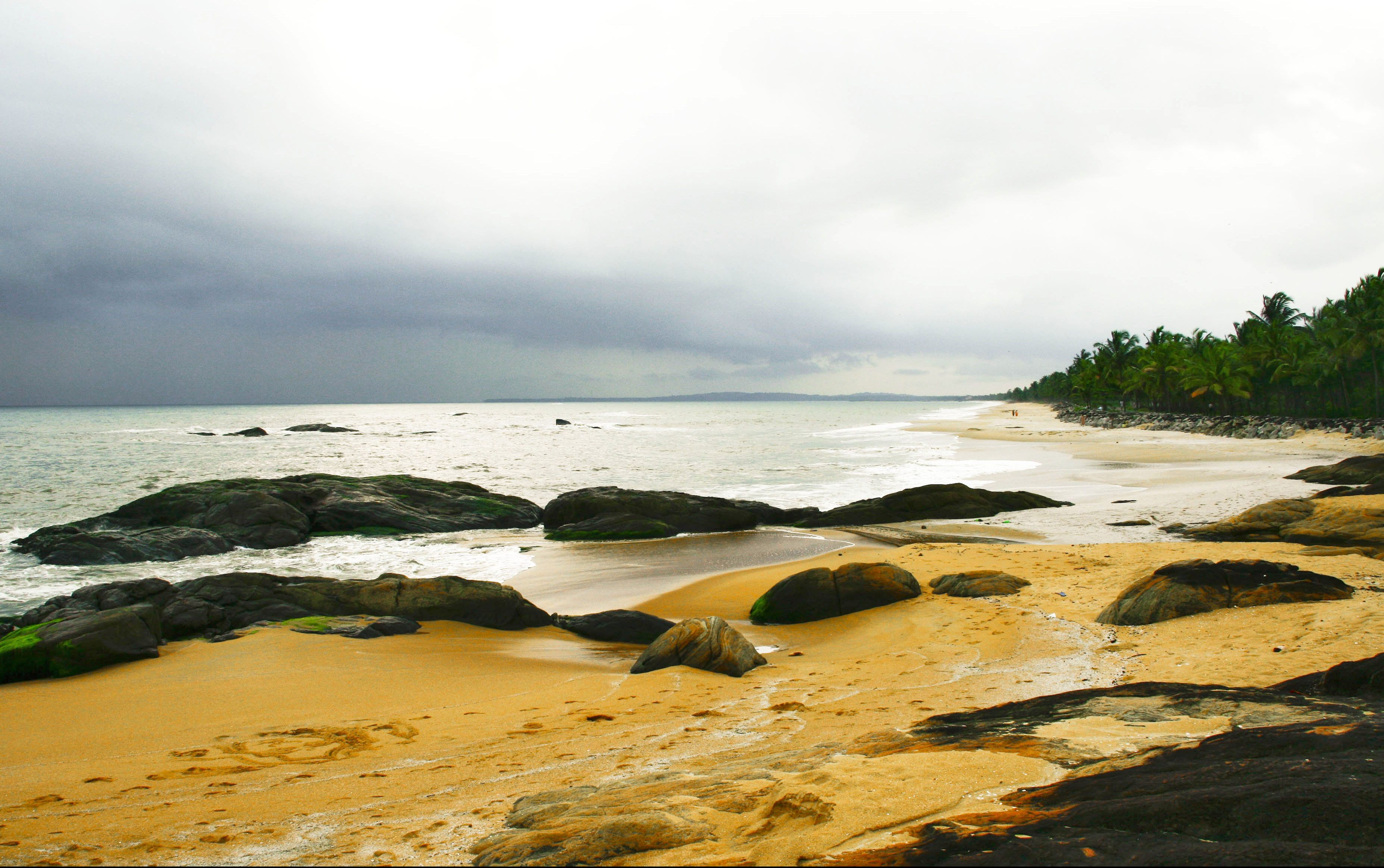
Kappad beach near Koyilandy

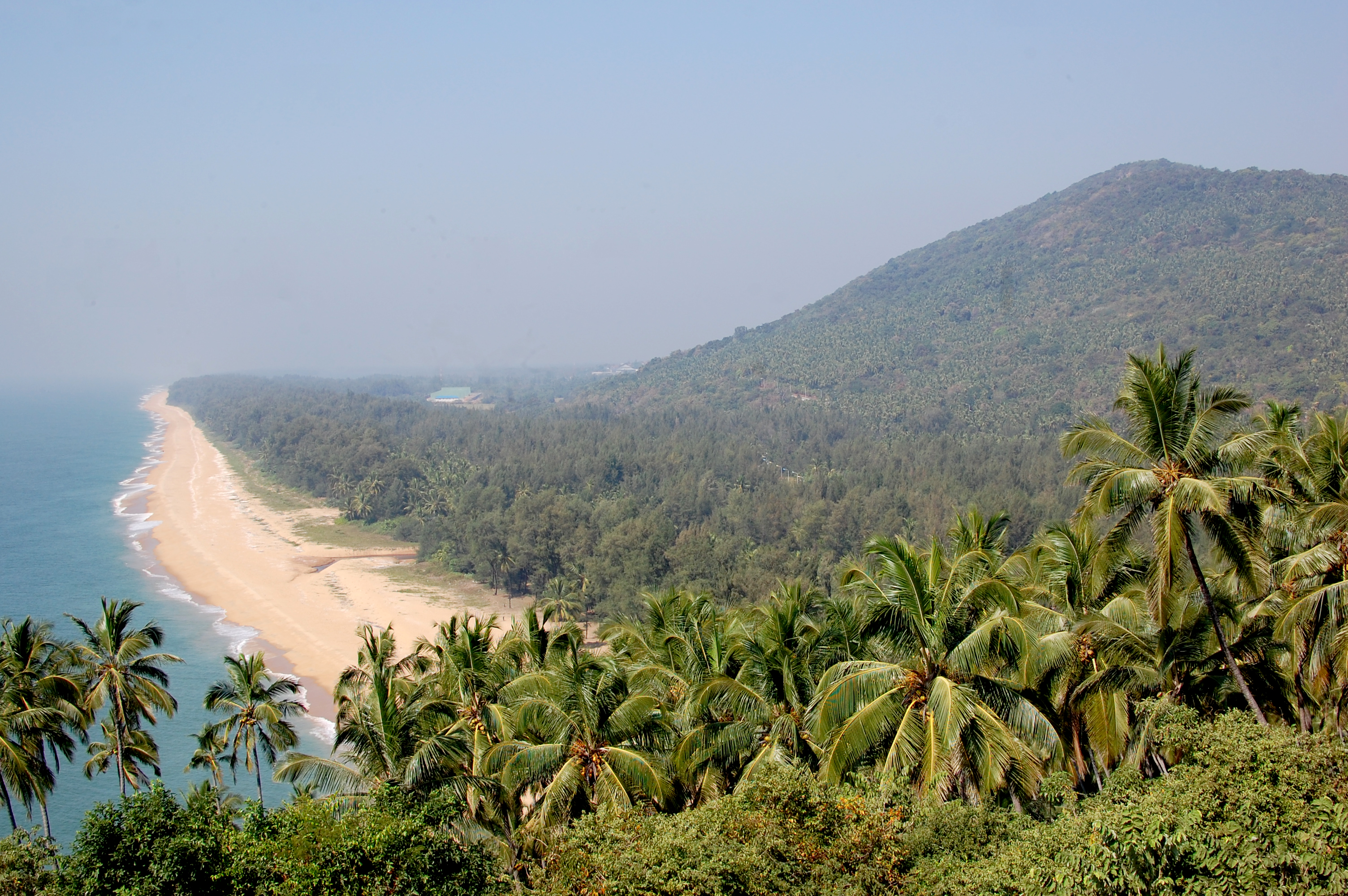
Sandy beaches dotted with swaying coconut palms are a ubiquitous sight along the Malabar coast.

=== Physical geography ===
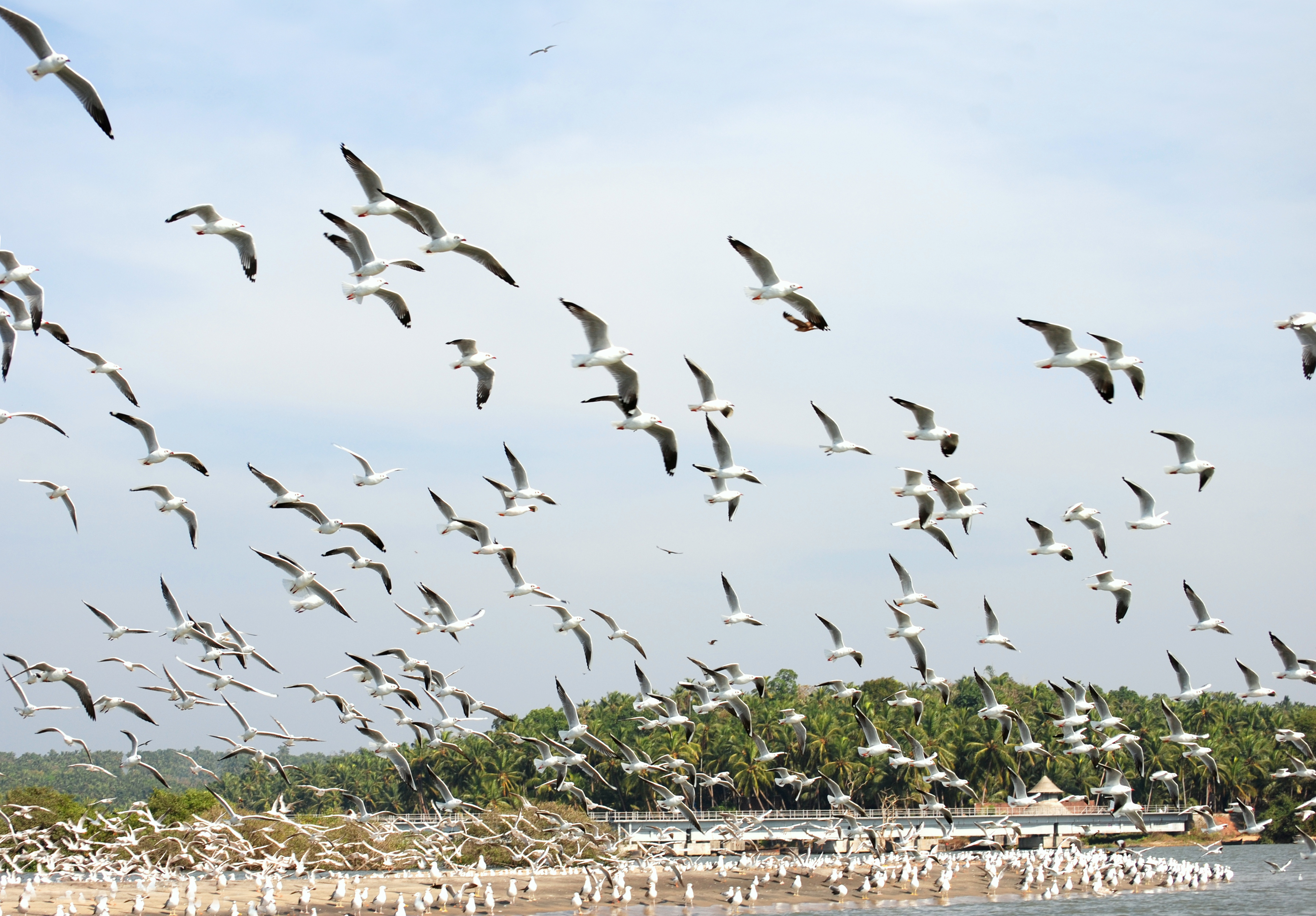
A view of the Kadalundi Bird Sanctuary. The coastal area of Malabar is home to several migratory birds.

The term Malabar Coast is sometimes used as an all-encompassing term for the entire Indian coast from the western coast of Konkan to the tip of the subcontinent at Cape Comorin. It is over 525 miles or 845 kilometers long. It spans from the south-western coast of Maharashtra and goes along the coastal region of Goa, through the entire western coast of Karnataka and Kerala and reaches till Kanyakumari. It is flanked by the Arabian Sea on the west and the Western Ghats on the east. The Southern part of this narrow coast is the South Western Ghats moist deciduous forests. Climate-wise, the Malabar Coast, especially on its westward-facing mountain slopes, comprises the wettest region of southern India, as the Western Ghats intercept the moisture-laden Southwest monsoon rains.

=== Malabar rainforests ===
The Malabar rainforests include these ecoregions recognized by biogeographers:

1. the Malabar Coast moist forests formerly occupied the coastal zone, up to the 250 meters in elevation (but 95% of these forests no longer exist)
2. the South Western Ghats moist deciduous forests grow at intermediate elevations
3. the South Western Ghats montane rain forests cover the areas above 1000 meters

The Monsooned Malabar coffee bean comes from this area.

=== Port cities ===
The Malabar Coast featured (and in some instances still does) several historic port cities. Notable among these were/are Naura, Vizhinjam, Muziris, Nelcynda, Beypore and Thundi (near Ponnani or Kadalundi) during ancient times, and Kozhikode (Calicut), Kollam, Ponnani, Kannur (Cannanore), and Cochin in the medieval period, and have served as centers of the Indian Ocean trade for millennia.

Because of their orientation to the sea and to maritime commerce, the Malabar coast cities feel very cosmopolitan, and have been home to some of the first groups of Jews (known today as Cochin Jews), Syrian Christians (known as Saint Thomas Christians), Muslims (presently known as Mappilas), and Anglo-Indians in India.

== History ==
=== Prehistory ===
A substantial portion of the Malabar Coast including the western coastal lowlands and the plains of the midland may have been under the sea in ancient times. Marine fossils have been found in an area near Changanassery, thus supporting the hypothesis. Pre-historical archaeological findings include dolmens of the Neolithic era in the Marayur area of the Idukki district, which lie on the eastern highland made by Western Ghats. Rock engravings in the Edakkal Caves, in Wayanad date back to the Neolithic era around 6000 BCE.

=== Ancient and medieval history ===
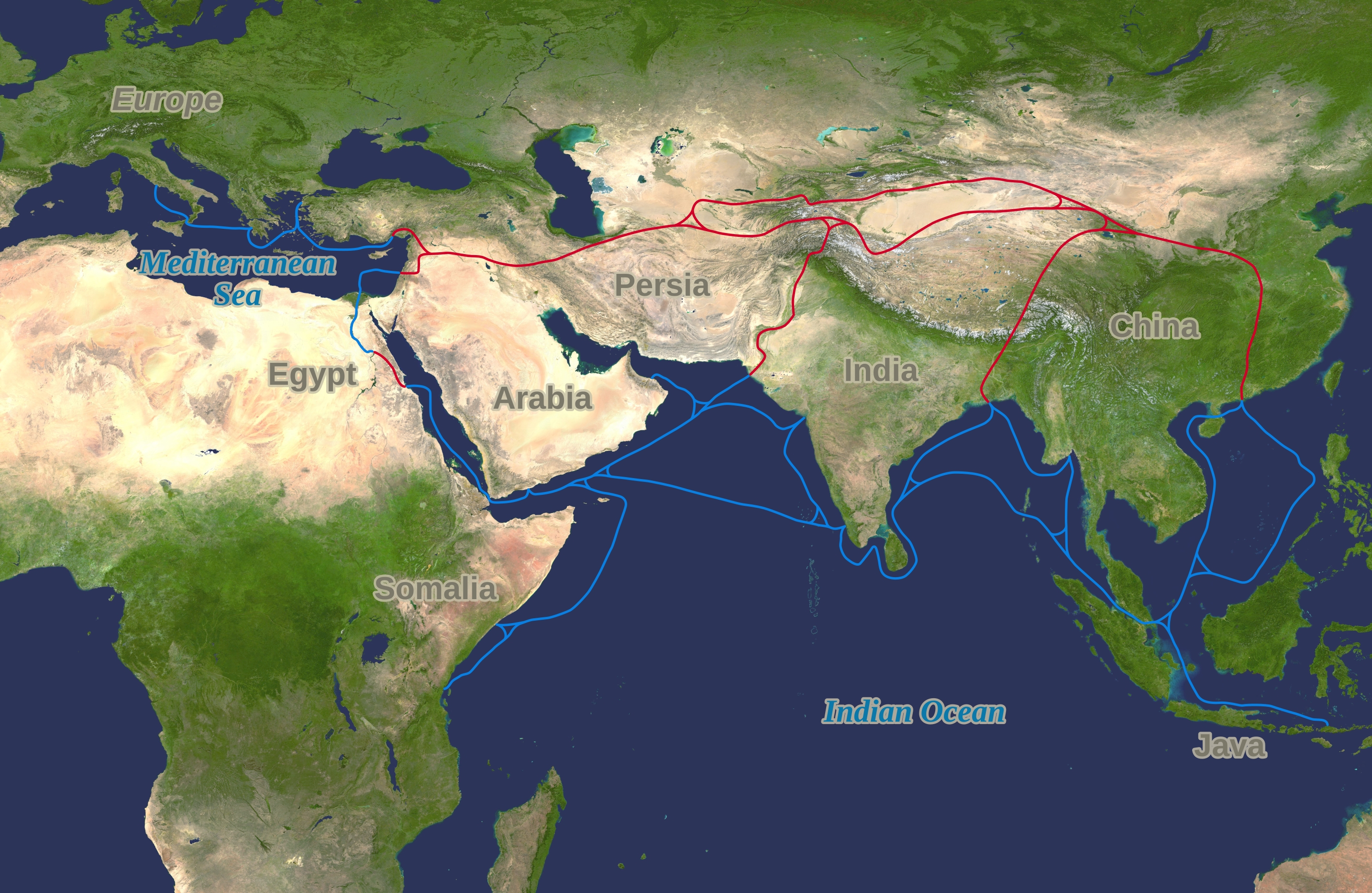
Silk Road and Spice trade, ancient trade routes that linked India within the Old World, carried goods and ideas between the ancient civilisations of the Old World and India. The land routes are red; the water routes are blue.

Names, routes and locations of the Periplus of the Erythraean Sea (1st century CE)

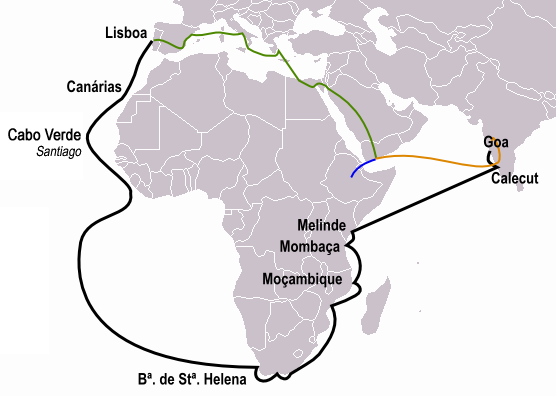
The path Vasco da Gama took to reach Kozhikode (black line) in 1498, which was also the discovery of a sea route from Europe to India, and eventually paved way for the European colonisation of Indian subcontinent

The Malabar Coast has been a major spice exporter since 3000 BCE, according to Sumerian records and it is still referred to as the "Garden of Spices" or as the "Spice Garden of India". Kerala's spices attracted ancient Arabs, Babylonians, Assyrians and Egyptians to the Malabar Coast in the 3rd and 2nd millennia BCE. Phoenicians established trade with Malabar during this period. Arabs and Phoenicians were the first to enter the Malabar Coast to trade Spices. The Arabs on the coasts of Yemen, Oman, and the Persian Gulf, must have made the first long voyage to Malabar and other eastern countries. They must have brought the Cinnamon of Malabar to the Middle East. The Greek historian Herodotus (5th century BCE) records that in his time the cinnamon spice industry was monopolized by the Egyptians and the Phoenicians.

According to the Periplus of the Erythraean Sea, a region known as Limyrike began at Naura and Tyndis. However, the Ptolemy mentions only Tyndis as the Limyrike's starting point. The region probably ended at Kanyakumari; it thus roughly corresponds to the present-day Malabar Coast. The value of Rome's annual trade with the region was estimated at 50,000,000 sesterces. Pliny the Elder mentioned that Limyrike was prone by pirates. The Cosmas Indicopleustes mentioned that the Limyrike was a source of Malabar peppers. In the last centuries BCE the coast became important to the Greeks and Romans for its spices, especially Malabar pepper. The Cheras had trading links with China, West Asia, Egypt, Greece, and the Roman Empire. In foreign-trade circles the region was known as Male or Malabar. Muziris, Tyndis, Naura (near Kannur), and Nelcynda were among the principal ports at that time. Contemporary Sangam literature describes Roman ships coming to Muziris in Kerala, laden with gold to exchange for Malabar pepper. One of the earliest western traders to use the monsoon winds to reach Kerala was Eudoxus of Cyzicus, around 118 or 166 BCE, under the patronage of Ptolemy VIII, king of the Hellenistic Ptolemaic dynasty in Egypt. Roman establishments in the port cities of the region, such as a temple of Augustus and barracks for garrisoned Roman soldiers, are marked in the Tabula Peutingeriana, the only surviving map of the Roman cursus publicus.

The term Kerala was first epigraphically recorded as Ketalaputo (Cheras) in a 3rd-century BCE rock inscription by emperor Ashoka of Magadha. It was mentioned as one of four independent kingdoms in southern India during Ashoka's time, the others being the Cholas, Pandyas and Satyaputras. The Cheras transformed Kerala into an international trade centre by establishing trade relations across the Arabian Sea with all major Mediterranean and Red Sea ports as well those of the Far East. The dominion of Cheras was located in one of the key routes of the ancient Indian Ocean trade. The early Cheras collapsed after repeated attacks from the neighboring Cholas and Rashtrakutas.

During the early Middle Ages, Namboodiri Brahmin immigrants arrived in Kerala and shaped the society on the lines of the caste system. In the 8th century, Adi Shankara was born at Kalady in central Kerala. He travelled extensively across the Indian subcontinent founding institutions of the widely influential philosophy of Advaita Vedanta. The Cheras regained control over Kerala in the 9th century until the kingdom was dissolved in the 12th century, after which small autonomous chiefdoms, most notably the Kingdom of Kozhikode, arose. The 13th century Venetian explorer, Marco Polo, would visit and write of his stay in the province. The port at Kozhikode acted as the gateway to medieval South Indian coast for the Chinese, the Arabs, the Portuguese, the Dutch, and finally the British.

In 1498, Vasco Da Gama established a sea route to Kozhikode during the Age of Discovery, which was also the first modern sea route from Europe to South Asia, and raised Portuguese settlements, which marked the beginning of the colonial era of India. European trading interests of the Dutch, French and the British East India companies took centre stage during the colonial wars in India. Travancore became the most dominant state in Kerala by defeating the powerful Zamorin of Kozhikode in the battle of Purakkad in 1755. Paliath Achan of Cochin and Travancore united to expel the Zamorin of Calicut from Kochi territories. Under Martanda Pillai's leadership, Travancore's Nair forces, with General de Lannoy's guidance, successfully captured Thrissur in the Battle of Thrissur in 1763. Despite fierce resistance, the Zamorin's troops retreated, leading to their eventual evacuation from Cochin Territory. In pursuit of peace, the Zamorin agreed to indemnify Travancore for war expenses and vowed perpetual friendship, marking a triumph of strategy and valor led by Pillai. After the Dutch were defeated by Travancore king Marthanda Varma, the British crown gained control over Kerala through the creation of the Malabar District in northern Kerala and by allying with the newly created princely state of Travancore in the southern part of the state until India was declared independent in 1947. The state of Kerala was created in 1956 from the former state of Travancore–Cochin, the Malabar district and the Kasaragod taluk of South Canara District of Madras state.

=== British colonialism: Malabar District ===
After the Anglo-Mysore wars, the parts of the Malabar Coast, those became British colonies, were organized into a district of British India. The British district included the present-day districts of Kannur, Kozhikode, Wayanad, Malappuram, much of Palakkad (Excluding Chittur taluk), some parts of Thrissur (Chavakkad Taluk), and the Fort Kochi region of Ernakulam district, besides the isolated islands of Lakshadweep. The administrative headquarters was at Kozhikode.

A map of the erstwhile Malabar District in 1951

Malabar District, a part of the ancient Malabar (or Malabar Coast) was a part of the British East India Company–controlled state. It included the northern half of the state of Kerala and the islands of Lakshadweep. Kozhikode is considered as the capital of Malabar. The area was divided into two categories as North and South. North Malabar comprises present Kasaragod and Kannur Districts, Mananthavady Taluk of Wayanad District and Vatakara and Koyilandy Taluks of Kozhikode District. The left-over area is South Malabar aka Kozhikode it's included present Kozhikode and Thamarassery taluk, south wayanad it's included present kalpetta and sulthan battery places, Eranad Taluk which comes under present Malappuram District, Palakkad District and Chavakkad taluk of Thrissur district.

During the British rule, the Malabar's chief importance laid in producing pepper, tiles, and coconuts. In the old administrative records of the Madras Presidency, it is recorded that the most remarkable plantation owned by Government in the erstwhile Madras Presidency was the Teak plantation at Nilambur planted in 1844. The District of Malabar and the ports at Beypore and Fort Kochi had some sort of importance in the erstwhile Madras Presidency as it was one of the two districts of the Presidency that lies on the Western Malabar Coast, thus accessing the marine route through Arabian Sea. The first railway line of Kerala from Tirur to Beypore in 1861 was laid for it.

=== After Indian independence ===
With India's independence, Madras presidency became Madras State, which was divided along linguistic lines on 1 November 1956, whereupon Kasaragod region was merged with the Malabar immediately to the north and the state of Travancore–Cochin to the south to form the state of Kerala. Before that, Kasaragod was a part of South Canara district of Madras Presidency. Lakshadweep Islands were separated to form a new union territory.

== Ayurveda and traditional healing traditions ==
The Malabar Coast played a significant role in the development and preservation of classical Ayurveda in Kerala. Several hereditary physician families known as the Ashtavaidya traditions emerged from different parts of Kerala and contributed to Sanskrit scholarship, medical education and clinical practice based on classical Ayurvedic texts such as the Ashtanga Hridayam.

Among the notable Ayurvedic lineages associated with Malabar is the Pulamanthole Mooss tradition from present-day Malappuram district. The family belongs to the Ashtavaidya system and has historically been associated with the preservation and practice of classical Kerala Ayurveda.

Regional traditions and historical accounts state that physicians from the Pulamanthole Mooss lineage maintained connections with the royal households of Travancore (Thiruvithamkoor), including consultation and treatment practices associated with members of the Travancore royal family during the princely state period. The royal patronage extended toward Ayurveda and Sanskrit scholarship by Travancore rulers contributed to the prominence of traditional physician families across Kerala, including those connected with Malabar.

The Pulamanthole tradition is associated with the study and application of the Ashtanga Hridayam, one of the foundational texts of Ayurveda attributed to Vagbhata. The lineage is also connected with the Sree Rudhra Dhanwanthari Temple at Pulamanthole, a temple dedicated to Lord Dhanwanthari, regarded in Hindu tradition as the deity of Ayurveda and healing.

The temple is known for rituals associated with healing traditions, including the Sarva Roga Shamana Pooja, which is conducted as a devotional observance for relief from diseases and physical suffering. The ritual attracts devotees and Ayurveda followers from different parts of Kerala and outside the state.

Institutions associated with the lineage include Pulamanthole Mooss Ayurveda Hospital and related treatment centres engaged in Panchakarma, neurological rehabilitation, musculoskeletal disorders and hereditary condition management.

The tradition gained wider cultural recognition through associations with Carnatic musician Chembai Vaidyanatha Bhagavatar, who reportedly underwent Ayurvedic treatment under the Pulamanthole tradition after suffering voice-related ailments.

In contemporary times, institutions associated with the lineage have expanded their activities through charitable healthcare initiatives including Ayurveda Thanal, aimed at improving access to Ayurvedic treatment and support for economically disadvantaged communities.

== See also ==
- Coromandel Coast
- Coastal South West India
- Battle of Thrissur
- Dutch Malabar
- Kerala Backwaters
- List of rivers of Kerala
- Travancore
- Venad (kingdom)
- Zamorin
- Thiru-Kochi
- Malabar (disambiguation)
- Malabar District
- Malabars
- Portuguese Empire
- Portuguese India
- Thalassery cuisine
