= Chemancheri railway station =

Railway station in Kerala, India

Chemancheri

General information
- Location: India
- Coordinates: 11.4055°N 75.7194°E
- System: Regional rail and light rail station

Other information
- Status: Functioning
- Station code: CMC
- Zone(s): Southern Railway zone
- Division(s): Palakkad
Route map
- Sources
Location
- Location within India Location within Kerala

Chemancheri railway station (Code:CMC) is a monument of India's freedom struggle and the station serving the historical town of Kappad in the Kozhikode district of Kerala, India. It lies in the Shoranur–Mangalore section of the Southern Railways. Trains halting at the station connect the town to prominent cities in India such as Thiruvananthapuram, Kochi, Chennai, Kollam, Bangalore, Kozhikode, Kannur, Coimbatore, Mangalore, Mysore and so forth.
