= Viyyur (Koyilandy taluk) =

- Village
- Location in Kerala, India Viyyur (India)
- Coordinates: 11.454722°N 75.684167°E
- Country: India
- State: Kerala
- Region: South India
- District: Kozhikode

Languages
  - Official: Malayalam, English
- Time zone: UTC+5:30 (IST)
- PIN: 673305
- Telephone code: 91 496

Viyyur is one of the 34 villages in Koyilandy thaluk of Kozhikode district.

== Trivia ==
Viyyur grama panchayat can be mistaken with Viyyur by its name, the later lies in Thrissur district of Kerala state. Both the places have same official spelling in English and the regional language, Malayalam.

== Transportation ==
Viyyur village connects to other parts of India through Koyilandy town. The nearest airports are at Kannur and Kozhikode. The nearest railway station is at Koyiandy. The national highway no.66 passes through Koyilandy and the northern stretch connects to Mangalore, Goa and Mumbai. The southern stretch connects to Cochin and Trivandrum. The eastern National Highway No.54 going through Kuttiady connects to Mananthavady, Mysore and Bangalore.
