= Eravattur =

Coordinates: 11°35′N 75°44′E

- village
- Interactive map of Eravattur
- Country: India
- State: Kerala
- District: Kozhikode

Population (2011)
  - Total: 17,016

Languages
  - Official: Malayalam, English
- Time zone: UTC+5:30 (IST)
- Vehicle registration: KL-

Eravattur is a village in Kozhikode district in the state of Kerala, India.

== Demographics ==
As of 2011 India census, Eravattur had a population of 17016 with 8223 males and 8793 females.

== Transportation ==
Eravattur connects to other parts of India through Perambra town. The nearest airports are at Kannur and Kozhikode. The nearest railway station is at Koyiandy. The national highway no.66 passes through Koyilandy and the northern stretch connects to Mangalore, Goa and Mumbai. The southern stretch connects to Cochin and Trivandrum.
