= Kayanna =

Kayanna Kayanna bazar
- village
- kayanna Location in Kerala, India Kayanna (India)
- Coordinates: 11°29′30″N 75°50′30″E
- Country: India
- State: Kerala
- District: Kozhikode

Government
  - Type: panchayath

Population (2011)
  - Total: 16,776

Languages
  - Official: Malayalam,
- Time zone: UTC+5:30 (IST)
- PIN: 673525
- Telephone code: 0496
- Vehicle registration: KL-77
- Nearest city: Perambra
- Lok Sabha constituency: Kozhikkode
- Vidhan Sabha constituency: Balusseri
- Climate: medium hot (Köppen)

Kayanna is a village in Kozhikode district in the state of Kerala, India.

== Demographics ==
As of 2011 India census, Kayanna had a population of 16,776 with 8,131 males and 8,645 females.

== Transportation ==
Kayannavillage connects to other parts of India through Vatakara town on the west and Kuttiady town on the east. National Highway No. 66 passes through Vatakara and the northern stretch connects to Mangalore, Goa and Mumbai. The southern stretch connects to Cochin and Trivandrum. The eastern National Highway No.54 going through Kuttiady connects to Mananthavady, Mysore and Bangalore. The nearest airports are at Kannur and Kozhikode. The nearest railway station is at Vatakara.

== History ==
Kayanna police station became notorious for torturing communists like Rajan during the Indian emergency of the 1970s.
