= Chempanoda =

- Village
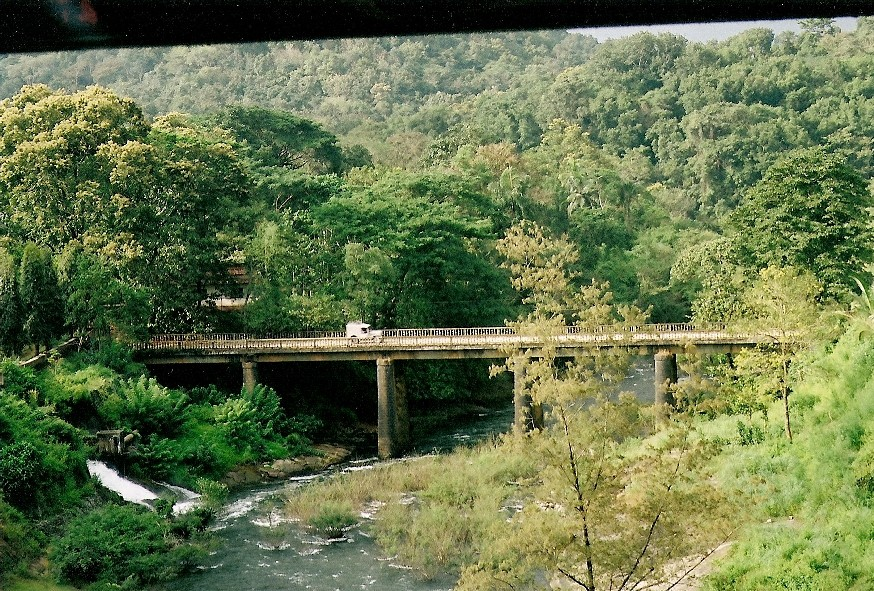
- Road to Cheampanoda

- Location in Kerala, India Chempanoda (India)
- Country: India
- State: Kerala
- District: Kozhikode

Languages
  - Official: Malayalam, English
- Time zone: UTC+5:30 (IST)
- PIN: 673528
- Telephone code: 0496
- Vehicle registration: KL-18, KL-11, KL-77
- Coastline: 0 kilometres (0 mi)
- Nearest city: Kozhikode
- Sex ratio: 1028 ♂/♀
- Literacy: 98.6%
- Lok Sabha constituency: Vatakara
- Climate: Tropical monsoon (Köppen)
- Avg. summer temperature: 35 °C (95 °F)
- Avg. winter temperature: 20 °C (68 °F)

Chempanoda/Chempanod is a village in the northeastern part of the Kozhikode district of Kerala, India.
