= Kottur, Kerala =

Kottur
- Village
- Location in Kerala, India Kottur (India)
- Coordinates: 11°33′0″N 75°49′30″E
- Country: India
- State: Kerala
- District: Kozhikode

Area
  - Total: 28.96 km^{2} (11.18 sq mi)

Population (2011)
  - Total: 11,979
  - Density: 413.6/km^{2} (1,071/sq mi)

Languages
  - Official: Malayalam, English
- Time zone: UTC+5:30 (IST)
- Postal code: 673614
- Vehicle registration: KL
- Coastline: 0 kilometres (0 mi)
- Climate: Tropical monsoon (Köppen)
- Avg. summer temperature: 35 °C (95 °F)
- Avg. winter temperature: 20 °C (68 °F)

Kottur is a grama panchayat and a community development block in the Kozhikode district of Kerala, India. It is about 25 km from Thiruvananthapuram. It has an elephant care and cure centre.

== Celebrities ==
The noted Malayalam poet N. N. Kakkad was born in the Avitanallur village of the Kottur panchayat.

== Location ==
Koottalida is the main town in Kottur grama panchayat. It is around 33 km from Kozhikode city, and regular bus service is available from Kozhikode, Balussery, and Perambra.

== Geography ==
Kottur is surrounded by the hills like Thurutha Mala, Chengodu Mala, Vazhora and Vallora.

== Temples ==
There are many locally famous temples in this panchayat: Neeroth Sree Maha Vishnu Kshethram Lakshmi Narayana temple, Avitanallur, Thrikkuttissery Mahadeva Kshethram, Chundali Shiva Kshethram, Hundakkatt Shiva Kshethram, Vakayadu Kotta and Kottur Maha Vishnu Kshethram, Pootakkandi Paradevata Kshethram.

== Education ==
The main educational institutions are Govt. higher Secondary School Avitanallur, Naduvannur Higher Secondary School, GUPS Thrikkuttissery, ALPS Avitanallur, Poonath Nellissery UPS, Kottur AUP School, GLPS Peruvacheri and Moolad schools, Neeroth GLPS etc.

== Transportation ==
Kottur village connects to other parts of India through Koyilandy town. The nearest airports are at Kannur and Kozhikode. The nearest railway station is at Koyilandy. The national highway no.66 passes through Koyilandy and the northern stretch connects to Mangalore, Goa and Mumbai. The southern stretch connects to Cochin and Trivandrum. The eastern National Highway No.54 going through Kuttiady connects to Mananthavady, Mysore and Bangalore.
