= Nanmanda =

Village in Kozhikode, Kerala, India

(Nanminda) നന്മണ്ട
- village
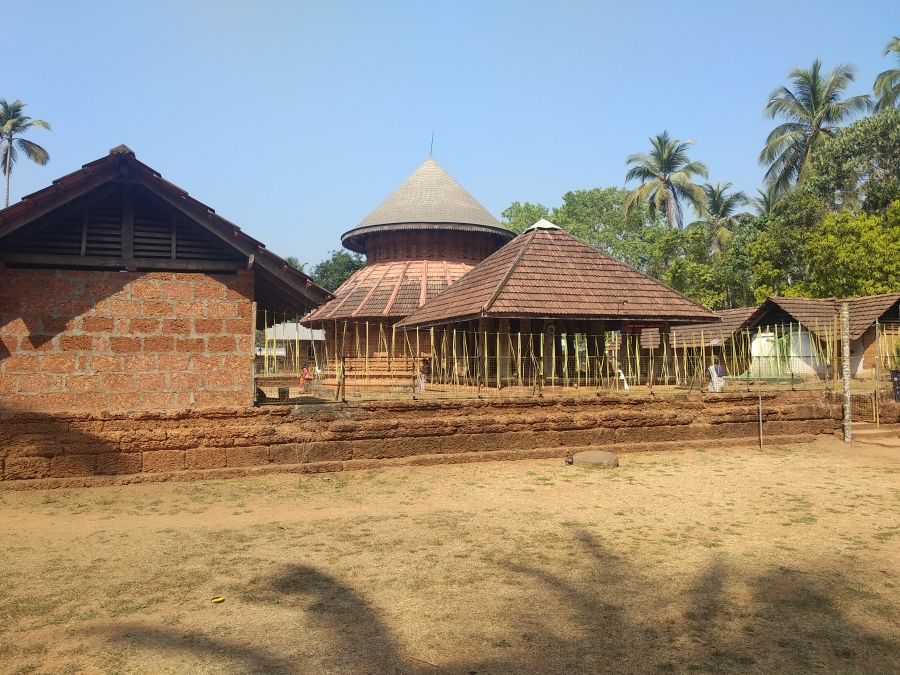
- Chembadicha ambalam (Nanjundeswara temple), Nanminda.
- Nickname: Good brain (നല്ല+മണ്ട) = നന്മണ്ട
- Location in Balussery, Kozhikode, Kerala, India
- Coordinates: 11°25′20″N 75°49′55″E
- Country: India
- State: Kerala
- District: Kozhikode
- Named for: Kshetra stalam (ക്ഷേത്രസ്ഥലം)

Population (2011)
  - Total: 27,316
  - Rank: Normal

Languages
  - Official: Malayalam, English & Malayalam
- Time zone: UTC+5:30 (IST)
- PIN 673 613 Sub Post Office.: 6xxxxx
- Vehicle registration: KL-76

Nanminda is a village in the Kozhikode district of Kerala, India. located 2.8 km from Balussery town, placing it in the outskirts of the town. Nanminda is also written as "Nanmanda".

== Demographics ==
As of 2011 India census, Nanmanda had a population of 27,316, with 12,910 males and 14,406 females. The area of Nanminda panchayath is fully included in Nanminda village. It is located 19 km towards North from District headquarters Kozhikode. 407 km from State capital Thiruvananthapuram.

Nanminda is comprising with Nanminda 12th Mile, 13th Mile and 14th Mile. Balussery is the closest town centre. Nanminda Higher Secondary School located at 12th Mile which was established in 1950 is one of the oldest schools across Nanminda.

Nanminda is known for its green paddy fields, coconut farms, areca nut farms, banana plantains, Jack fruit and Mango trees, water falls, lakes, hills and fishing.

Key sectors including agriculture, animal husbandry, dairy production, regional economic development, poverty alleviation, public health, women's empowerment, social justice, and scheduled caste and scheduled tribe (SC/ST) development are showing positive performance indicators. Specific initiatives are being planned to integrate SC/ST settlements into the mainstream infrastructure and economy.

== Suburbs and villages ==
- Karakkunnath, Koolippoyil and Ambalapoyil
- Nanmanda 12, Nanmanda 13 and Nanmanda 14
- Poyil thazham, Balabhodhini, Nanminda madu
- Cheekkilode

== Important landmarks ==
- Panyamvalli Varyam Madam Vishnu Temple, Nanminda
- Thali Maha Temple, Nanminda
- Kuttamboor Narasimha Temple, Karakkunnath
- Nanjundeshwara Shiva Temple, Nanminda 13
- Kozhinjipparambath Temple
- Narakassery temple, Nanminda
- Pallikkara Sree Mahavishnu Sudarsana moorthi Temple, Nanminda 14/4, Near Balussery Mukku
- Kuniyil Narasimha Kshethram, Ambalapoyil, Nanminda
- Puthiyottumkandy Karinkaputhoyon kavu
- Alachatt Sreekrishna Temple, Nanminda 14
- Nanmanda Central Juma Masjid
- Nanminda Higher Secondary School, Nanminda 12
- Gnanapradayani ALP School
- National ALP School
- Nanminda AUP School
- Karunaram AUP School
- Nanminda Thiyyakkoth Bhagavathi Temple
- Kiliyanamkandi Bhagavathi Temple

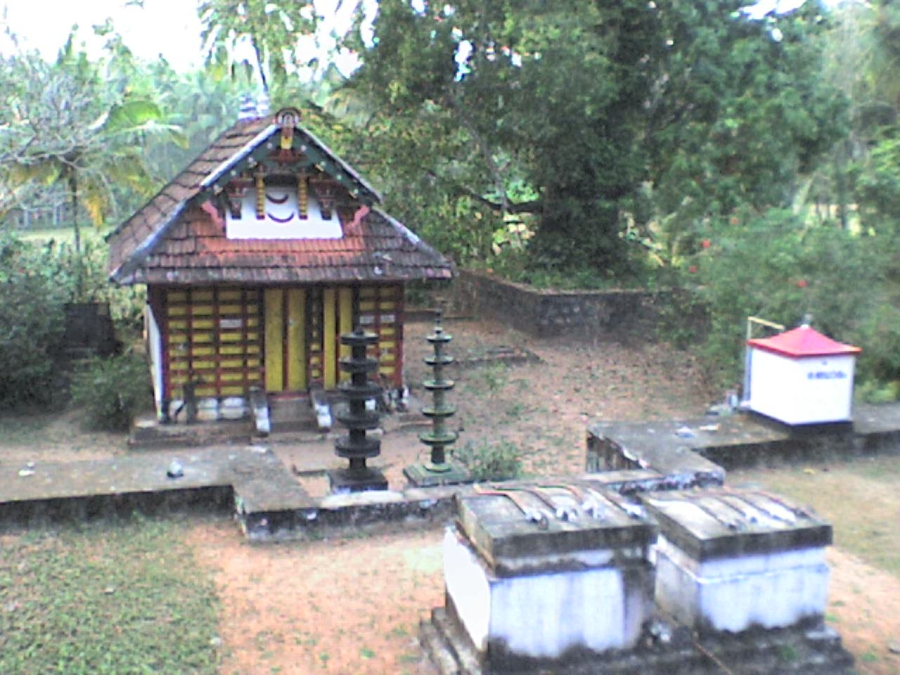
Narakassery temple, Nanminda (Before renovation)
