= Ulliyeri =

Ulliyeri Ulliyeri
- Village
- Nickname: Ulliyeri
- Location in Kerala, India Ulliyeri (India)
- Coordinates: 11°26′0″N 75°47′0″E
- Country: India
- State: Kerala
- District: Kozhikode

Population (2011)
  - Total: 32,509

Languages
  - Official: Malayalam, English
- Time zone: UTC+5:30 (IST)
- PIN: 673323
- Vehicle registration: KL-56
- Nearest city: Kozhikode
- Lok Sabha constituency: Kozhikode
- Vidhan Sabha constituency: Balussery

Ulliyeri is a village in Kozhikode district in the state of Kerala, India. Ulliyeri lies between Koyilandy and Balussery as well as between Kuttiyadi and Kozhikode.

== Demographics ==
As of 2011 India census, Ulliyeri had a population of 32,509, with 15,285 males and 17,224 females.

== Politics ==
Ulliyeri is a part of Kozhikode Lok Sabha constituency.

Ulliyeri is part of Balussery assembly constituency. In the first decade of Indian independence, Balussery supported the Indian National Congress party, but support since then has shifted to the Left Democratic Front. Former Kerala state minister A C Shanmukhadas got a mammoth lead from this Grama Panchayat as part of Balussery assembly constituency, and he was elected continuously for the past 25 years as MLA.

Ulliyeri gramapanchayat is a strong LDF supporting village. It is a red support area in its political bias. Left Democratic Front has been ruling this village for years.

LDF ruling in 19 wards out of 20 gramapanchayat wards. But recently in 2015 local body elections UDF improved its position to 8 seats

== Transport ==
State Highway 34 which connects Edavanna-Koyilandi and State Highway 38, connecting Puthiyangadi-Ulliyeri-Perambra-Chovva(Kannur) passes through Ulliyeri. The nearest railway station is Koyilandy, 9 km away. Nearest airport is Calicut international airport(Calicut CCJ) 50 km away.

== Education ==
Palora higher secondary school is the major education institution in this village. Palora high school, Narath U P School, Mundoth Govt. L P School & Ulliyeri U P School are the other schools in this panchayath. A private medical college namely Malabar Medical college, Modakkallur plays a role in professional education along with its constituent dental college called the Sree Anjaneya institute of dental sciences. A college of nursing in the same campus provides health care and medical education.

Another milestone in the development of Ulliyeri in the field of education is the launching of an Engineering College atop the Palora Hill named after M. Dasan the late Communist-Marxist leader who represented Kozhikode-1 in the Kerala Legislative Assembly. The College is in the co-operative sector and caters to the needs of the young men and women in and around Ulliyeri to pursue studies in the IT field.

There have two Islamic institutions, Darunajath Arabic college, affiliated with Darul Huda Islamic university, and Al Rula Hifz Academy, for Quran study.
