= Atholi, Kerala =

Atholi
- village
- Korapuzha river

- Location in Kerala, India
- Coordinates: 11.425280°N 75.773780°E
- Country: India
- State: Kerala
- District: Kozhikode

Languages
  - Official: Malayalam, English
- Time zone: UTC+5:30 (IST)
- PIN: 673315
- Vehicle registration: KL-

Atholi is a Grama Panchayat in the Kozhikode district of Kerala state, South India It is a small town on the banks of the Korapuzha River. The state highway to Kuttiyadi passes through Atholi and is connected to National Highway 66 via Kuniyil Kadavu Bridge, which is the longest bridge in Kozhikode District. The Kappad Thusharagiri State Highway 68 passes through Atholi.

== Economy ==
Traditionally Agriculture and Fishing were the economic activities of people. The coir making industry also played a vital role. Atholi was an ideal place for coir industry because of its coconut plantations and the boating route through the Korapuzha river to other parts of Malabar. Coir products like rope and carpets from Atholi were famous throughout Malabar region. During the late-1970s men from Atholi started moving to Middle East (especially Saudi Arabia, Bahrain, UAE, and Kuwait) in search of better job opportunities which even continues today. Now the remittance from abroad by these employees is the back bone of the economy.

Important landmarks at Atholi include:

- Kuniyilkadavu bridge
- Govt VHSS Atholi
- Atholi Co-operative hospital
- Luxmore Convention Centre
