= Arikkulam =

- village
- Location in Kerala, India Arikkulam (India)
- Coordinates: 11.4974200°N 75.719960°E
- Country: India
- State: Kerala
- District: Kozhikode

Population (2011)
  - Total: 18,378

Languages
  - Official: Malayalam, English
- Time zone: UTC+5:30 (IST)
- Postal code: 673620
- Vehicle registration: KL-77

Drishyam Arikkulam

Arikkulam is a village in Kozhikode district in the state of Kerala, India. It is a gram panchayat in Kozhikode district.

== Geography ==
Arikkulam is located at 11.43°N 75.70°E. It has an average elevation of 2 m (6.6 ft).
