= Kozhikode metropolitan area =

Greater Kozhikode Metropolitan Area Kozhikode urban agglomeration
- Urban Agglomeration
- Nickname: City of Spices Port City of Kerala
- Country: India
- State: Kerala
- District: Kozhikode district

Government
  - Body: Corporation of Kozhikode

Area
  - Total: 909.79 km^{2} (351.27 sq mi)

Population (2011)
  - Total: 2,028,399
  - Density: 2,229.5/km^{2} (5,774.4/sq mi)

Languages
  - Official: Malayalam, English
- Time zone: UTC+5:30 (IST)
- Telephone code: 0495 and 0496
- Vehicle registration: KL-11, KL-18, KL-56, KL-57, KL-76, KL-77, KL-85
- Nearest city: Kozhikode
- Sex ratio: 1102
- Literacy: 95.42

Kozhikode metropolitan area or Calicut urban agglomeration or Kozhikode urban agglomeration is the 19th largest urban agglomeration in India and 2nd largest in Kerala after the Kochi Metropolitan Area according to the 2011 Census of India. The Urban Agglomeration spans across 909.79 square kilometres of area encompassing a population of 2,028,399 (2.028 million).

The area constituted on the basis of census data 2011, consists of Corporation of Kozhikode and the municipalities of Vatakara, Koyilandy, Ramanattukara, Feroke, Payyoli, Koduvally, Mukkam .

== Constituents of the urban agglomeration ==
No.	Location	Type	Population
1	Kozhikode	City corporation	609224
2	Atholi	Census town	28,213
3	Ayancheri	Census town	26,293
4	Azhiyur	Census town	30,023
5	Balusseri	Census town	27,363
6	Chekkiad	Census town	24,246
7	Chemancheri	Census town	34,819
8	Chorode	Census town	38,245
9	Edacheri	Census town	26,819
10	Eramala	Census town	34,658
11	Feroke	Municipality	54,074
12	Iringal	Census town	25,894
13	Kadalundi	Out growth	42,516
14	Kakkodi	Census town	42,866
15	Karuvanthuruthy	Census town	21,952
16	Keezhariyur	Census town	15,116
17	Koduvally	Municipality	50,787
18	Kottappally	Census town	21,169
19	Kozhukkallur	Census town	14,007
20	Kunnamangalam	Census town	53,396
21	Kunnummal	Census town	18,031
22	Kuruvattur	Census town	34,241
23	Kuttikkattoor	Census town	25,929
24	Maniyur	Census town	21,820
25	Mavoor	Census town	29,781
26	Meppayyur	Census town	13,922
27	Nadapuram	Census town	40,230
28	Naduvannur	Census town	25,979
29	Nanmanda	Census town	27,316
30	Olavanna	Census town	43,895
31	Palayad	Census town	18,141
32	Panangad	Census town	14,347
33	Pantheeramkavu	Census town	24,537
34	Perumanna	Census town	35,460
35	Peruvayal	Census town	27,598
36	Poolacode	Census town	29,872
37	Payyoli	Municipality	
38	Koyilandy	Municipality	71,873
39	Ramanattukara	Municipality	35,937
40	Thalakkulathur	Census town	29,388
41	Thazhecode	Census town	25,116
42	Thikkody	Census town	27,051
43	Thuneri	Census town	23,421
44	Thurayur	Census town	14,176
45	Ulliyeri	Census town	32,509
46	Vatakara	Municipality	75,295
47	Valayam	Census town	14,328
48	Villiappally	Census town	34,502
