= Thamarassery =

- Town; Taluk
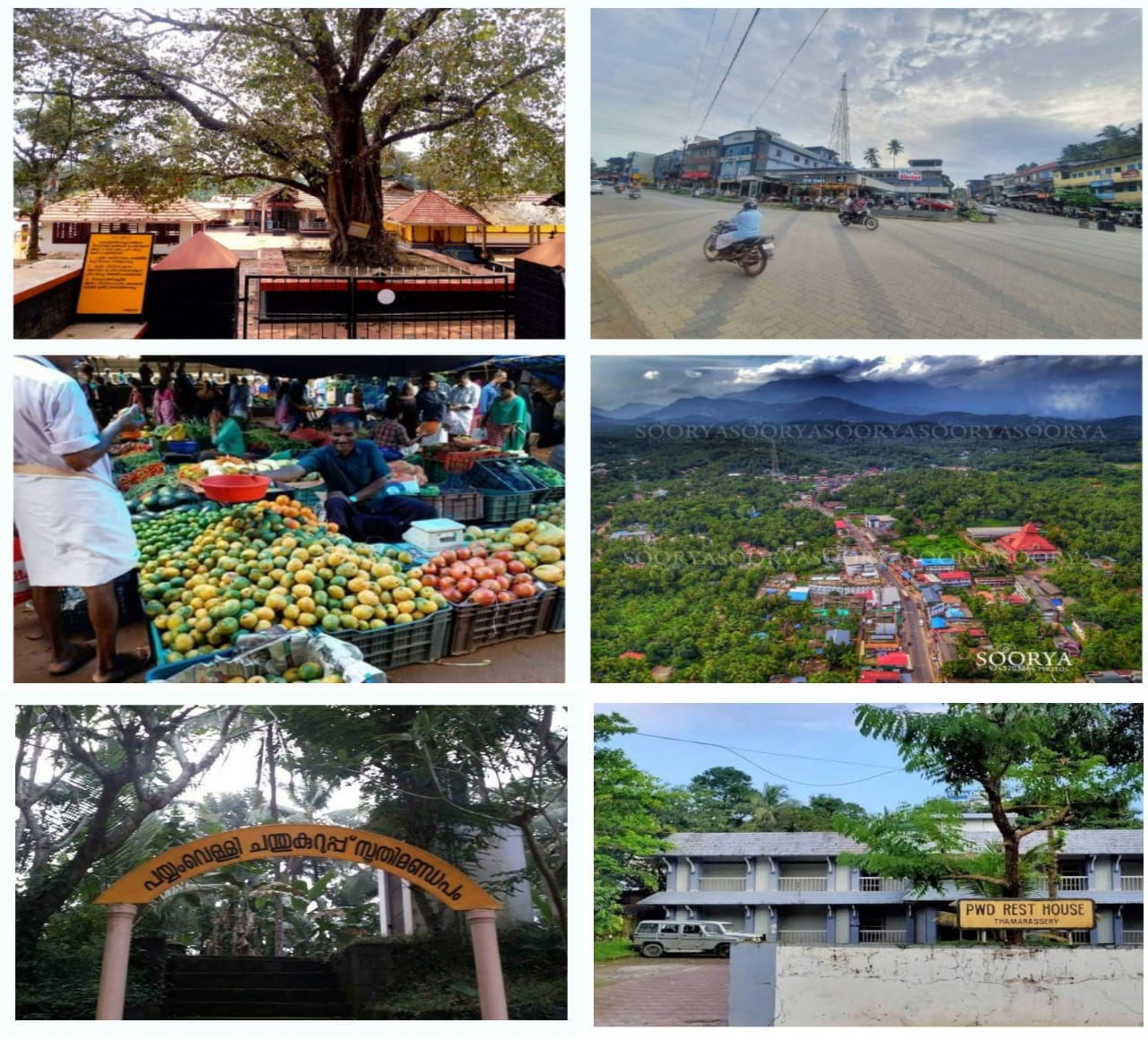
- Clockwise from the top: Kottayil Temple, Chunkam junction, Thamarassery skyline, PWD rest house, Payyamballi Chandu memorial, Weekly market
- Nickname: Tsy
- Location in Kerala, India Thamarassery (India)
- Coordinates: 11°24′50″N 75°55′22″E
- Country: India
- State: Kerala
- District: Kozhikode

Area
  - Total: 27.17 km^{2} (10.49 sq mi)

Population (2011)
  - Total: 35,706
  - Density: 1,314/km^{2} (3,404/sq mi)

Languages
  - Official: Malayalam, English
- Time zone: UTC+5:30 (IST)
- PIN: 673573
- Nearest city: Kozhikode

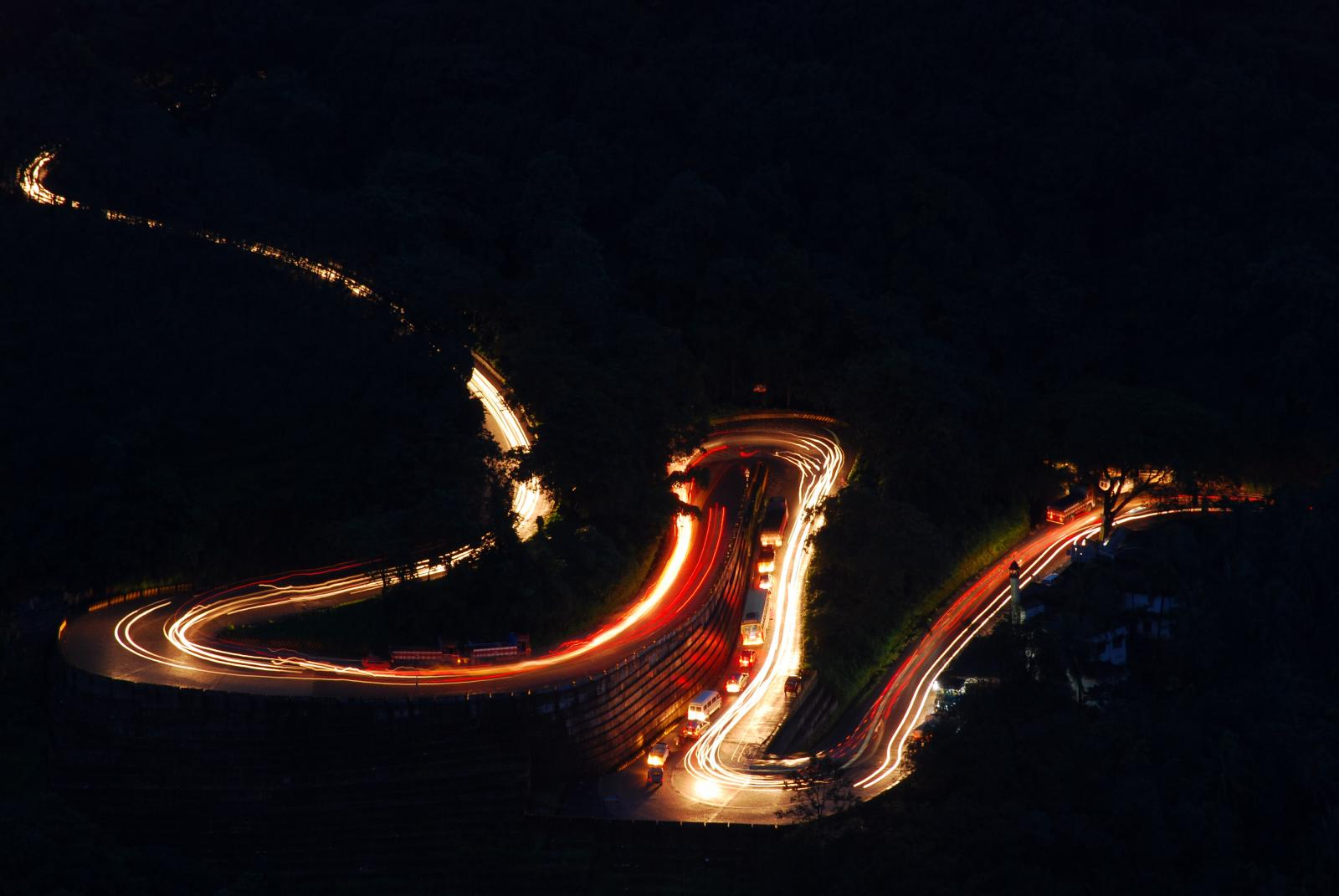
Thamarassery Churam - Night View

Public Library

Bus Bay Jn

Thamarassery, formerly known as Thazhmalachery, is one of the taluks and a major hill town in the Kozhikode district of Kerala, India, 30 km north-east of Kozhikode city and 29 km east of Koyilandy. The town lies on National highway 766.It is included in Koduvally Assembly constituency.

== Etymology ==
The old name of the town; Tazhmalachery comes from Mala(hill) and Thazhvaram(valley) and Cheri(village) Thamarassery comes from the Malayam words thaamara "lotus" and cheri "village".

== History ==
Thamarassery belonged to the Kingdom of Kottayam before India became independent. Kottayam kings who died fighting the British were given part of the land of Thamarassery in the days before freedom. The tomb of Payyampally Chandu, who was a warrior under the Kottayam Raja, is located at the Thamarassery Kotayil Sree Bhagavathi Temple.

In 1936 the Thamarassery panchayat was formed, although a public health center had already been operating for some time prior. Attakoya Thangal was the first panchayat president. JT Abdurahiman Master is the president of the Thamarassery Panchayath (since 30 December 2020).

== Administration ==
Thamarassery panchayat is divided into 21 wards. Thamarassery panchayat falls under Koduvally state assembly constituency and Kozhikode loksabha constituency. The current MP is MK Raghavan of Congress and MLA is PK Firos of Muslim League. Thamarassery constitutes a taluk within the Kozhikode district.

== Notable locations ==

- The Syro-Malabar Catholic Diocese of Thamarassery

== Economy ==
Thamarassery is an agricultural area, and a large portion of its population are farmers. Coconut and rubber are the major products. Kerala's first rubber estate, now in the hands of AV Thomas and Co., is located in Thamarassery.

== Transportation ==
Thamarassery is well connected to its surrounding areas via roads (including NH766), which reaches Kozhikode, Kalpetta, Koyilandy, and Mukkam. Bus service is also available regularly. The Kerala State Road Transport Corporation (KSRTC) has a bus stand and depot at Thamarassery. All private buses operate from the new bus stand at Karadi nearby the KSRTC depot. The nearest airport, Calicut International Airport is 45 km away, while the Kozhikode Railway Station is 30km away.

The KSRTC bus service provides good connections to Kasargod, Kannur, Palakkad, Thrissur, Kottayam and Thiruvananthapuram. Several interstate bus services pass through Thamarassery, providing connections to Bengaluru, Mysuru, Ooty, Devala, Gundalpet and other major cities.

The KSRTC bus station in Thamarassery

== Notable people from Thamarassery ==
- Director Hariharan
- Robin Thirumala - writer, director
- Sports reporter VM Balachandran (popularly known as Vimcy)
- Ann Augustine - actress
- Jomol - actress

== Villages in Thamarassery taluk ==
The position of the Thamarassery Taluk in Kozhikode district is given below:

There are 20 villages in Thamarassery Taluk :

- Koodaranji
- Thiruvambady
- Nellipoyil
- Koduvally
- Puthur
- Kizhakkoth
- Narikkuni
- Raroth
- Kadavoor
- Kodanchery
- Puthuppadi
- Koodathai
- Kanthalad
- Vavad
- Engapuzha
- Kinaloor
- Panangad
- Sivapuram
