= Vavad =

Vavad may refer to:

- Vavad, India
- Vavad, Iran
