= Vimcy =

Indian sports writer (1924–2010)

- Born: Vilayattasseri Mullambalath Balachandran; 25 November 1924; Thamarassery, Kozhikode, Kerala
- Died: 9 January 2010 (aged 85); Bilathikulam, Kozhikode
- Education: Victoria College, Palakkad
- Occupation: Journalist
- Spouse: Satyabhama (fondly called Ammini)
- Children: KB Unnikrishnan, KB Vijayakrishnan, Meenakshi Sadanandan

Vilayattasseri Mullambalath Balachandran (25 November 1924 – 9 January 2010), known as Vimcy, was a sports writer from Kerala. He is considered to be the pioneer of sports journalism in Kerala.

== Biography ==
Balachandran was born on 25 November 1924 at Thamarassery in Kozhikode district to Dr. Narayanan Nair and Narayani. Unable to finish his intermediate education at Palakkad Victoria College due to ill health, he joined the Kozhikode newspaper Dinaprabha in 1949 as a journalist. In 1950, he became the assistant editor at Mathrubhumi. After he retired from Mathrubhumi in 1984, he became associate editor for Calicut Times. He continued to write sports columns for Mathrubhumi, Calicut Times and Madhyamam. His autobiography titled Valkkashnam is yet to be published. Vimcy died on 9 January 2010 at Bilathikulam in Kozhikode.

== Sports journalism ==
At a time when Malayalam newspapers dedicated little space to sports news, Vimcy started an entire sports page with Mathrubhumi. It was under him that sports writing became a separate branch of journalism in Kerala. Vimcy was also behind the weekly sports feature page Sports Special in Mathrubhumi. He used to write extensively about Football.

Vimcy won numerous awards, including one from the Kerala State Sports Council for lifelong contributions to the field of sports journalism. Other awards included M.P. Paily award, Neelambaran Memorial award (from Kesari Memorial Committee), T. Aboobacker award and Press Academy Silver Jubilee award. In 2001, Vimcy accurately predicted Srilankan Spinner Mutthiah Muralidharan to be the first bowler to reach 800 test wickets in his sports column in Matrubhumi weekly.
