= Avilora =

- Town
- Location in Kerala, India Avilora (India)
- Coordinates: 11.383°N 75.905°E
- Country: India
- State: Kerala
- District: Kozhikode

Languages
  - Official: Malayalam, English
- Time zone: UTC+5:30 (IST)
- PIN: 673572
- Vehicle registration: KL 57

Avilora is a village located in Kozhikode district of Kerala state, south India.

== Transportation ==
Avilora village connects to other parts of India through koduvally city. National highway No.212 passes through Koduvally . The nearest airports are at Kannur and Kozhikode. The nearest railway stations are koyilandy and kozhikode.
