= Karyat Sree Ayyappa Temple Vanimal =

Temple in Vanimal, India

Karyat Sree Ayyappa-Bhagavathi Temple is situated in Kallachi Vanimel road in Vanimal, kerala. The presiding deity in this temple is Lord Ayyappa. It was started as a small Bhajana Madam in the year 1987. The temple's ISIC codes are 9491 and SIC codes are 8661. The phone number for the temple is 085490 93979. The temple is open from Monday to Sunday at 5–9 AM, and at 5–8 PM.
