= Koduvally =

- Town
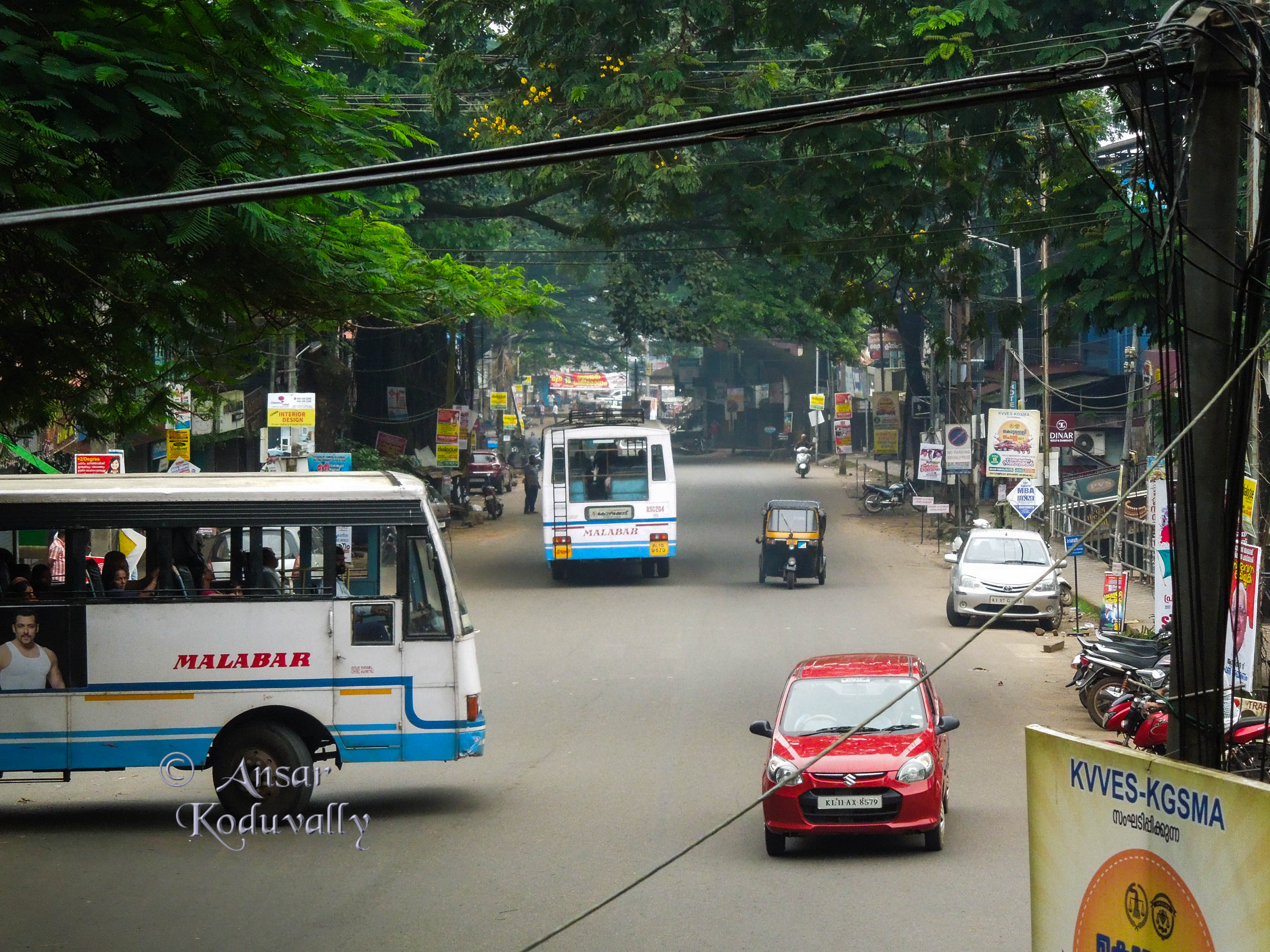
- Koduvally bus stand exit

- Location in Kozhikode, Kerala, India Koduvally (India)
- Coordinates: 11.359444°N 75.911111°E
- Country: India
- State: Kerala
- District: Kozhikode
- Established: 1 November 2015

Government
  - Type: Municipal Council
  - Body: Koduvally Municipality
  - Chairperson: Safeena Shameer (IUML)

Area
  - Total: 23.58 km^{2} (9.10 sq mi)

Population (2011)
  - Total: 48,678
  - Density: 2,064/km^{2} (5,347/sq mi)

Languages
  - Official: Malayalam, English
- Time zone: UTC+5:30 (IST)
- PIN: 673572
- Vehicle registration: KL-57, KL-11
- Website: www.facebook.com/Koduvallymunicipality

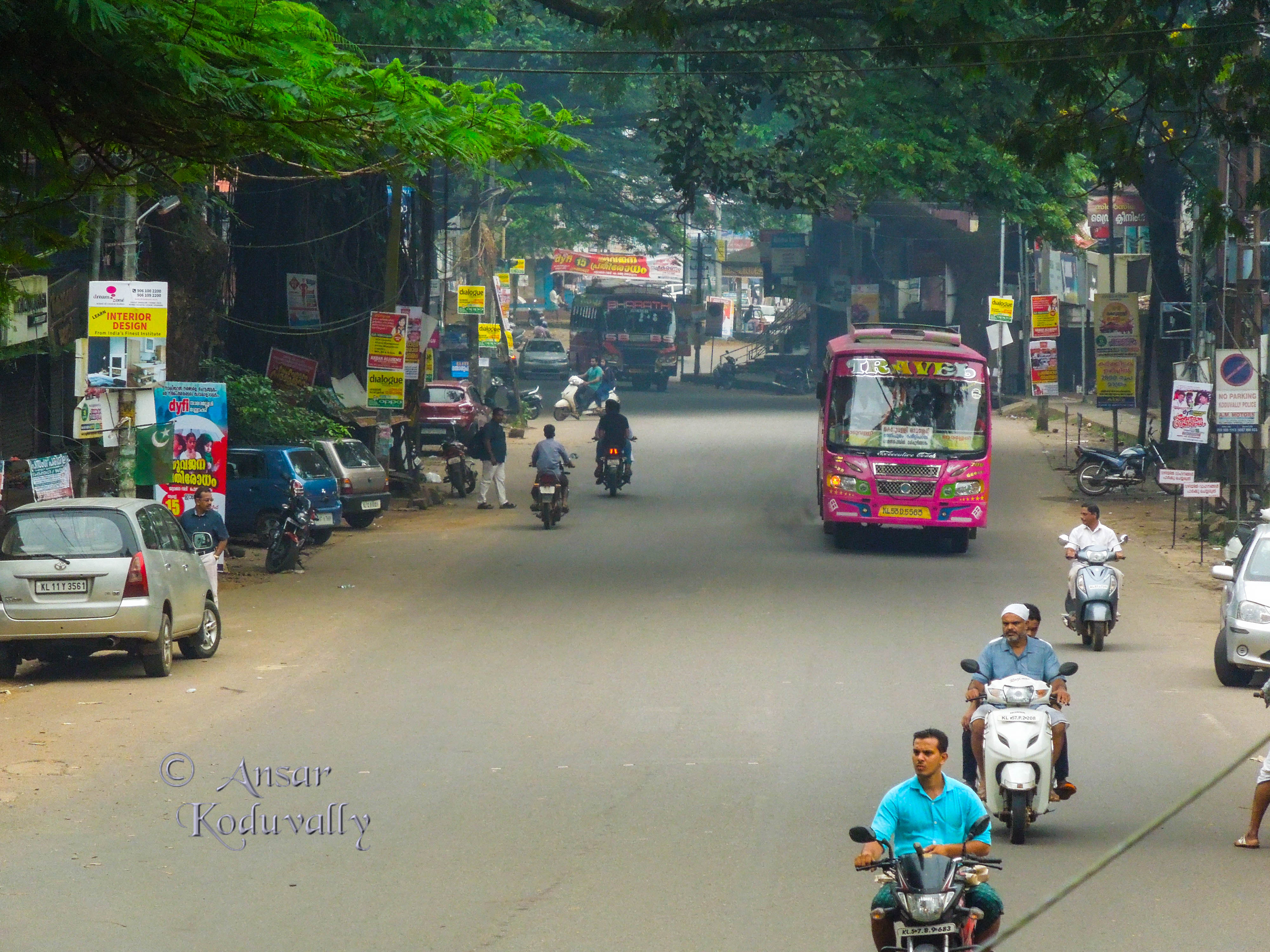
Koduvally main road

Koduvally is a major municipal town in Kozhikode district in the Indian state of Kerala. It is located on the National Highway 766 and is about 21 km northeast of Kozhikode city. Koduvally is nicknamed the "City of Gold" for its gold trade legacy during the 18th and 19th centuries. Koduvally is one of the 140 assembly constituencies in Kerala and one of the 12 block panchayats in Kozhikode. The nearest local bodies are Kizhakkoth, Madavoor, Kunnamangalam, Omassery, Mukkam, and Thamarassery. Koduvally also gives its name to the Koduvally River which flows west into the sea.

== History ==
The road between Koduvally and Kozhikode was improved in the early 1970s and the Koduvally Bridge was built. Koduvally was a major town in Calicut district during the period of British occupation. Koduvally legislative constituency was represented by E. Ahmed (former minister of government of India) in 1977.

== Koduvally Assembly Constituency ==
Koduvally Assembly constituency consists of the Panchayats Kizhakkoth, Madavoor, Narikkuni, Omassery, Kattippara, Thamarassery, and Koduvally Municipality. Karat Abdul Razak, an independent with support of LDF government, is the MLA of Koduvally. In the 2016 Assembly elections he defeated MA Razak Master, Muslim League at a margin of lower than 1000 votes. The present MP (member of parliament) E. Ahamed represented Koduvally constituency in 1977. C. Moyinkutty, and C. Mammootty also represented Koduvally Legislative Assembly.

History of Koduvally Assembly Constituency

| Year | Winner | Party | 2nd Place | Party | Lead |
|---|---|---|---|---|---|
| 2021 | MK Muneer | IUML | Karat Abdul Razak | NSC | 6344 |
| 2016 | Karat Abdul Razak | NSC | MA Razak Master | IUML | 573 |
| 2011 | V M Ummer Master | IUML | M. Mehaboob | CPIM | 16552 |
| 2006 | Adv P.T.A Rahim | IND | K. Muraleedharan | DIC | |
| 2001 | C. Mammutty | IUML | C. Mohasin | JD(S) | |
| 1996 | C. Moyinkutty | IUML | C. Mohasin | JD | |
| 1991 | P. V. Mohammed | IUML | C. Mohasin | JD | |
| 1987 | P. M. Aboobacker | IUML | P. Raghavan Nair | JNP | |
| 1982 | P. V. Mohammed | IUML | P. Raghavan Nair | JNP | |
| 1980 | P. V. Mohammed | IUML | K. Moosakutty | CPIM | |
| 1977 | E. Ahamed | IUML | K. Moosakutty | CPIM | |

== Landmarks ==
Koduvally contains a mini stadium, a police station and office of circle inspector of police, and Koduvally Muslim Orphanage.

== Economy ==
Koduvally has the biggest market for smuggled gold ornaments in the whole state. Most of the gold arriving here comes through black market routes. UnaisOne is a conglomerate headquartered in Koduvally city.

== Notable people ==
- K K Muhammed, Indian Archaeologist
- Karat Abdul Razak, Politician
- Thahir Zaman, Footballer
- Ahammed Aflah E, Architect,Urban planner

== See also ==
- Kunnamangalam
- Thamarassery
- Omassery
- Puthuppadi
- Thiruvambady
- Mukkam
- Mavoor
- Koyilandy
- Balussery
- Chamal
- Avilora
- Perumpilavu
