= Vavul Mala =

Mountain in India

Vavul Mala വാവുൾ മല
- Location within Kerala

Highest point
- Elevation: 2,339 m (7,674 ft)
- Prominence: 1,479 m (4,852 ft)
- Listing: Ribu
- Coordinates: 11°25′41″N 76°07′52″E

Geography
- Location: Border of Thamarassery Taluk, Kozhikode district and Nilambur Taluk, Malappuram district, Kerala, India
- Parent range: Western Ghats

Climbing
- Easiest route: hike

Vavul Mala is a peak in the Western Ghats in the Vellarimala range of Kerala, India. It is situated at the trijunction of the districts of Malappuram, Kozhikode and Wayanad in Kerala. Vavulmala resembles a "Camel Hump". Situated at a height of 2,339m, it is the highest peak in the Western Ghats northwards beyond the Nilgiris and also the highest point of Kozhikode district. These compact hills are floristically similar to Nilgiri hills.

The first volume of William Logan's 1887 publication Malabar Manual (the work was later followed up by the Malabar Gazetteer of 1908) refers the 7,677-foot high Vavul Mala as a landmark conspicuous far out to the Arabian Sea.

Vellarimala range is situated in the borders of Malappuram, Kozhikode and Wayanad. It is a high landscape known as "Camel Hump Mountains". It is separated from Nilgiri hills by Deccan Plateau and Chaliyar river valley. It is one of the toughest treks in South India.
