= Koduvally Municipality =

- Municipality
- Location in Kerala, India Koduvally Municipality (India)
- Coordinates: 11.359444°N 75.911111°E
- Country: India
- State: Kerala
- District: Kozhikode
- Established: 01-11-2015

Government
  - Type: Local Government (പ്രാദേശിക സർക്കാർ)
  - Body: Municipal Council
  - Chairperson: Muhammed jaseem rc

Area
  - Total: 23.58 km^{2} (9.10 sq mi)

Population (2011)
  - Total: 48,678
  - Density: 2,064/km^{2} (5,347/sq mi)

Languages
  - Official: Malayalam,
- Time zone: UTC+5:30 (IST)
- PIN: 673572
- Vehicle registration: KL 57
- Website: www.facebook.com/Koduvallymunicipality

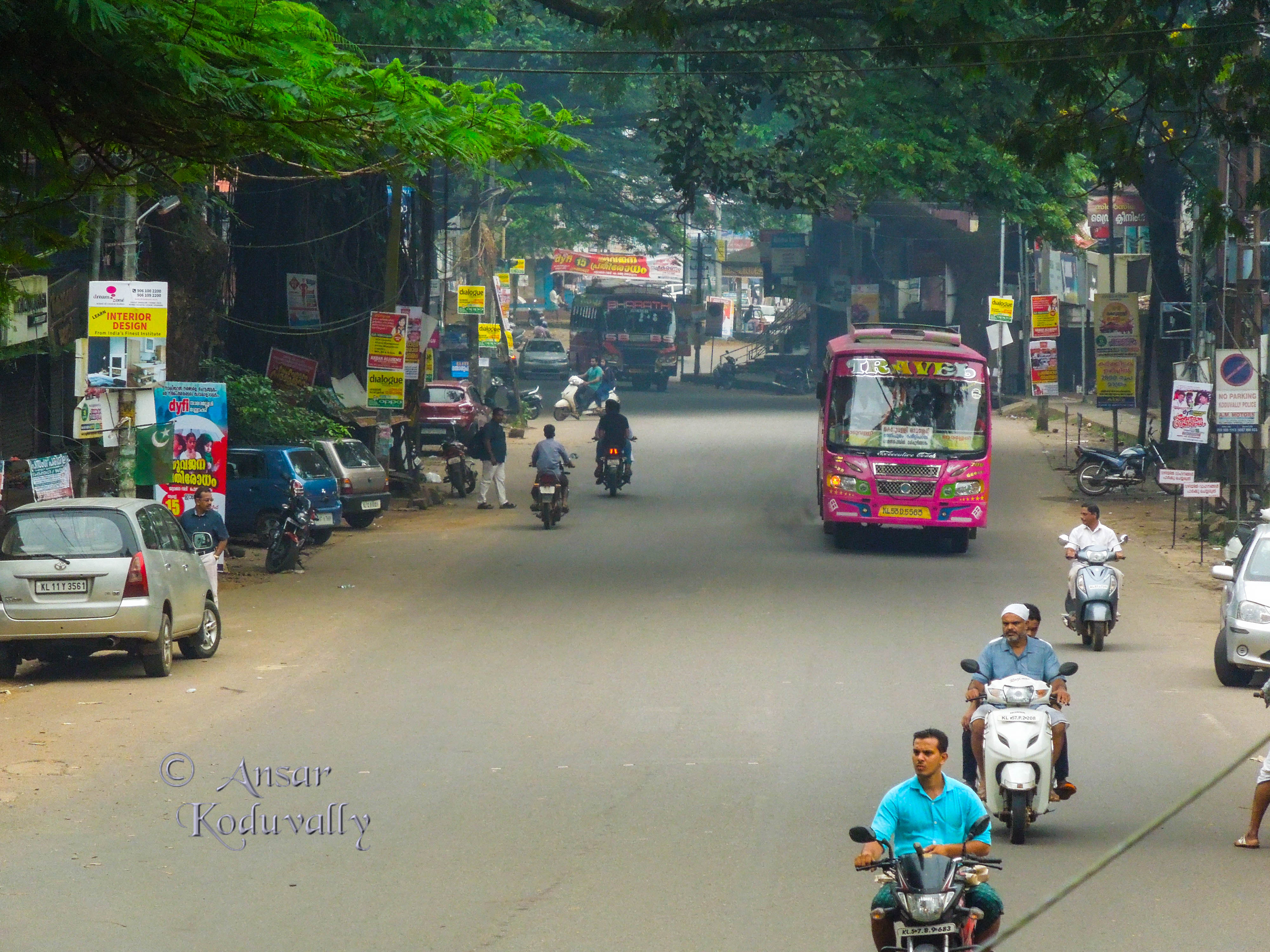
Koduvally Main Road

Koduvally is a major municipal town in Kozhikode district. Koduvally is known as the city of gold. It is located on the Calicut-Wayanad National Highway 212 (NH 766) and is about 22 km northeast of Kozhikode (Calicut) city. Koduvally Municipality is a newly converted 3rd grade Municipality form Koduvally Grama Panchayat with effect from 01.11.2015, Koduvally Municipality has 36 Wards. The main local towns in this municipality are Vavad, Nellamkandi, Koduvally West, Koduvally East, Koduvally Town, South Koduvally, Vennakkad, Thalapperumanna, Karuvanpoyil, Kareettiparamba, Manipuram And Kalaranthiri. The nearest local bodies are Kizhakkoth (West), Madavoor (West), Omassery (East), Kunnamangalam (South) and Thamarassery (North).Smt. Shareefa Kannadippoyil is the first chairperson of the Koduvally Municipality and Sri. A.P Majeed Master is the first deputy chairperson of the Koduvally Municipality.

== Revenue villages ==
- Vavad
- Koduvally
- Puthoor (partially)

== Head of the municipality ==
List of chairpersons

Sl No	Name	Political party	From	Up to
1	Shareefa Kannadippoyil	IUML	15.11.2015	11.11.2020
2	Sumayya Beevi S (Municipal Secretary)	Administrator for State Govt.	12.11.2020	29.12.2020
3	Abdu Vellara	IUML	28.12.2020	Continuing

List of secretaries

Sl No	Name	Designation	From	Up to
1	Babu Prasad B	Secretary (GP)	01.11.2015	15.03.2017
2	Vrija N K	Municipal Secretary Gr-III	16.03.2017	16.11.2017
3	AM Anilkumar	Superintendent	17.11.2017	19.07.2018
4	Jayanthi NP	Municipal Engineer	20.07.2018	10.03.2019
5	Faisal A	Municipal Secretary Gr-III	11.03.2019	03.02.2019
6	Abdul Kader P	Health Inspector Gr-I	04.12.2019	08.12.2019
7	Madhu TM	Superintendent	09.12.2019	28.01.2020
8	Abdul Kader P	Health Inspector Gr-I	29.01.2020	29.02.2020
9	Shailesh M	Superintendent	01.03.2020	06.07.2020
10	Anupama T	Municipal Secretary Gr-III	06.07.2020	28.10.2020
11	Sumayya Beevi S	Municipal Secretary Gr-III	28.10.2020	31.01.2021
12	Abdul Gafoor M	Municipal Engineer	01.02.2021	10.02.2021
13	Praveen A	Municipal Secretary Gr-III	11.02.2021	07.03.2022
14	Sujith P	Superintendent	08.03.2021	02.09.2022
15	Sasi Naduvilakkandi	Health Inspector Gr-I	03.09.2022	04.09.2022
16	Shaju Paul	Municipal Secretary Gr-III (Provisional)	05.09.2022	10.09.2023
17	Abdul Gafoor M	Municipal Engineer	11.09.2023	18.09.2023
18	Sudheer K	LSGD Secretary	19.09.2023	Continuing

== Landmarks ==
Koduvally Municipality contains a mini stadium, a branch of State Bank of India, the Federal Bank, Canara bank, Syndicate Bank for ATMs. a police station, Koduvally Muslim Orphanage, the KMO Arts and Science College and the Phoenix Pain and Palliative Care Society. A mini civil station, which was inaugurated in 2012 by Hon Chief Minister Oommen Chandy in the presence of Hon Industries minister PK Kunhalikutty is situated at the heart of Koduvally.

== Educational institutions ==
=== Government sector ===
1. - Govt. ITI, Koduvally
2. - Govt Higher secondary School, Koduvally
3. - Govt Higher secondary School, Karuvanpoyil
4. - GMUP School Kalarathiri
5. - GMUP School Vennakkad
6. - GMUP School Karuvanpoyil
7. - GMLP School Koduvally
8. - GMLP School Vavad
9. - GMLP School Thalapperumanna

=== Aided sector ===
1. - AUP School Manipuram
2. - AMLP School Parambathu Kavu
3. - AMLP School Palakkutty

=== Private sector ===
1. - KMO Arts & Science College, Koduvally
2. - KMO Industrial Training Center, Koduvally
3. - KMO Teachers Education School, Koduvally
4. - KMO Higher Secondary School, Koduvally
