= Thazhekkod =

Thazhekkod may refer to several places in Kerala, India:

- Thazhekkod, Malappuram district
- Thazhekkad, Irinjalakkuda
- Thazhecode, Kozhikode District
- Thazhekad, Thrissur, site of one of the earliest St Thomas Christian communities; location of the Thazhekad Sasanam, an inscribed stone granting it certain privileges
