= Engapuzha =

Engapuzha 24th mile
- Town
- Location in Kerala, India Engapuzha (India)
- Coordinates: 11°28′0″N 75°58′0″E
- Country: India
- State: Kerala
- District: Kozhikode

Area
  - Total: 24.14 km^{2} (9.32 sq mi)
- Elevation: 34 m (112 ft)

Population (2011)
  - Total: 18,244
  - Density: 754/km^{2} (1,950/sq mi)

Languages
  - Official: Malayalam, English
- Time zone: UTC+5:30 (IST)
- Postal code: 673586
- Vehicle registration: KL-57
- Website: www.engapuzha.com

Engapuzha is a small town in Kozhikode district in the state of Kerala, India.

== Demographics ==
As of 2011 India census, Engapuzha had a population of 18,244 with 8,745 males and 9499 females.

== Bus station ==
Engapuzha bus station has the distinction of being built right on a river. The town of Engapuzha is crowded and traffic snarls are a constant issue. Engapuzha connects to neighboring places like Payona, Nalekra, Poolod, Kunhukulam, Kakavayal, Karikulam Kuppayakode, Aachi, Kalpetta, Parapenpara, Kanchamvayal, Choyod, Kolamala, Thamarassery and Kodenchery.

== Transportation ==
This village connects to other parts of India through Calicut city on the west and Thamarassery town on the west. NH 66 passes through Kozhikode and the northern stretch connects to Mangalore, Goa and Mumbai. The southern stretch connects to Cochin and Trivandrum. The eastern NH 766 going through Adivaram connects to Kalpetta, Mysore and Bangalore. The nearest airports are at Kannur and Kozhikode. The nearest railway station is at Kozhikode.

== Places ==
=== Payona ===
Payona is a small town located 2 kilometres (1.2 mi) from Engapuzha town. Nowadays, more houses are built in the area, and it is developing steadily as the younger generation, having attained good educational qualifications, is now engaged in employment or business. The main sources of income are agriculture and animal rearing.

=== Nalekra ===
Nalekra is a small place towards south from Engapuzha town. It takes 10 minutes walk to reach Nalekra and there are at least 20 families staying in this area. Known personalities like Karimbayil Alikunhi Haji (late) is one of the early settlers in the area. He and his family settled from Palakutty (Koduvally) during mid 1950s. During that time the place was with three or four families only. In the beginning he focused on coconut plantation and animal rearing. Nalekra is surrounded by mainly coconut trees, limited paddy fields, and rubber plantations. People’s main source of income is from agriculture and animal rearing.

=== Mammunippadi ===
Mammunippadi is 2 kilometres (1.2 mi) away from Engapuzha while travelling through Engapuzha-Kodechery road. It's a small village, where most of the people are engaged in agriculture. Mostly rubber, paddy, coconut, and arecanut are cultivated here.

Poolode

Kanjamvayal
