= Poolacode =

- village
- Interactive map of Poolacode
- Country: India
- State: Kerala
- District: Kozhikode

Population (2011)
  - Total: 29,872

Languages
  - Official: Malayalam, English
- Time zone: UTC+5:30 (IST)
- PIN: 6XXXXX
- Vehicle registration: KL-

Poolacode is a village in Kozhikode district in the state of Kerala, India.

== Demographics ==
As of 2011 India census, Poolacode had a population of 29,872 with 14,668 males and 15,204 females.
