= Karuvanthuruthy =

Census town in Kerala, India

- village
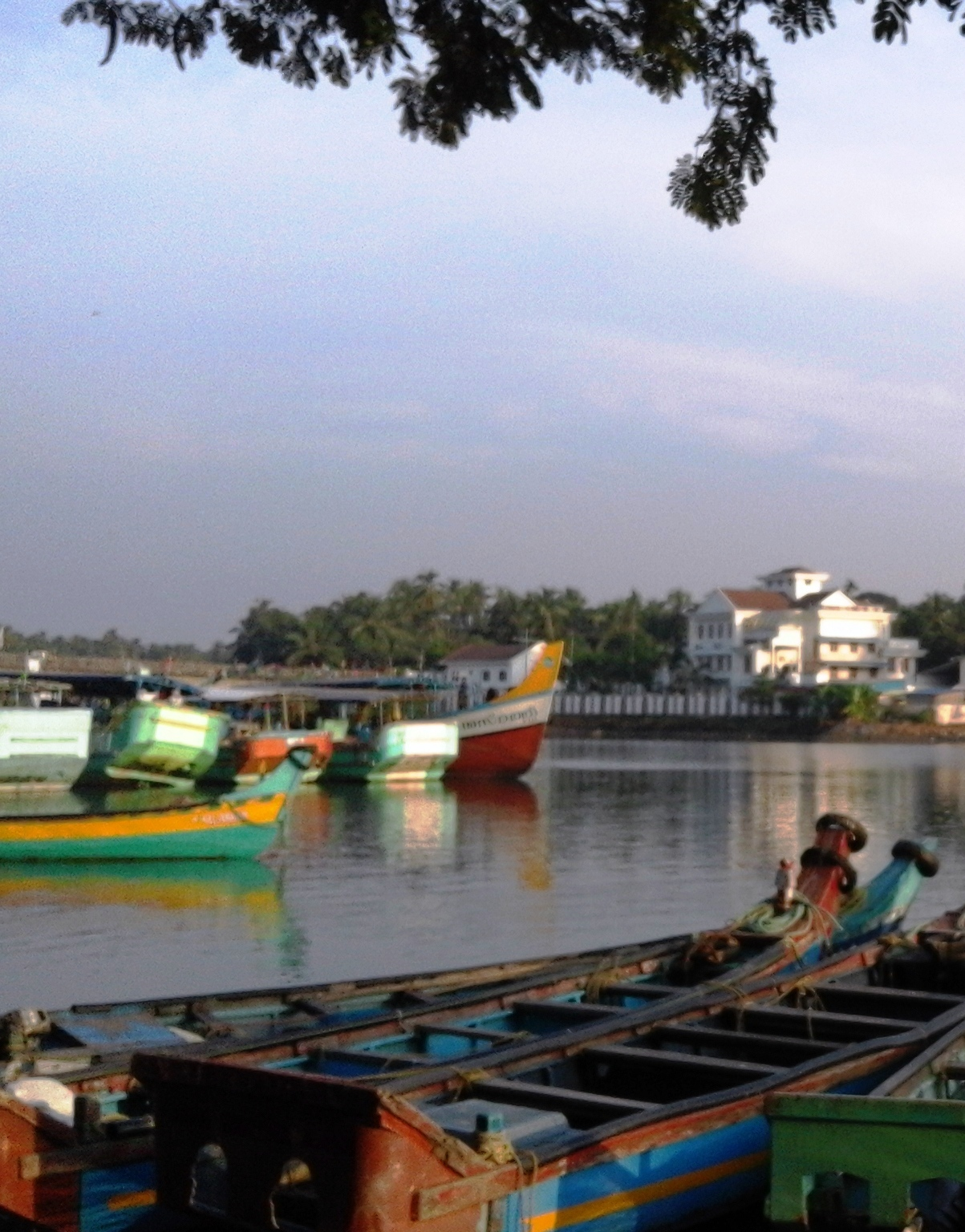
- Karuvanthuruthy Kadavu

- Location in Kerala, India Karuvanthuruthy (India)
- Coordinates: 11.33317°N 75.8166°E
- Country: India
- State: Kerala
- District: Kozhikode

Population (2001)
  - Total: 20,767

Languages
  - Official: Malayalam, English
- Time zone: UTC+5:30 (IST)

Karuvanthuruthy is a census town in Kozhikode district in the Indian state of Kerala.

== Demographics ==
As of 2001 Indian census, Karuvanthuruthy had a population of 20,767. Males constitute 49% of the population and females 51%. Karuvanthuruthy has an average literacy rate of 81%, higher than the national average of 59.5%: male literacy is 84%, and female literacy is 79%. In Karuvanthuruthy, 12% of the population is under 6 years of age.

== See also ==
- Beypore
- Feroke
- Kadalundi
- Kadalundi Bird Sanctuary
- Vallikkunnu
- Chaliyar river
