= Maniyoor =

- Census Town
- Location in Kerala, India Maniyoor (India)
- Coordinates: 11°57′0″N 75°27′0″E
- Country: India
- State: Kerala
- District: Kannur

Government
  - Type: Panchayati raj (India)
  - Body: Kuttiattoor Grama Panchayat

Area
  - Total: 14.02 km^{2} (5.41 sq mi)

Population (2011)
  - Total: 12,681
  - Density: 904.5/km^{2} (2,343/sq mi)

Languages
  - Official: Malayalam, English
- Time zone: UTC+5:30 (IST)
- PIN: 670592
- ISO 3166 code: IN-KL

Maniyoor is a census town in Kannur district in the Indian state of Kerala.

== Demographics ==
As of the 2011 Census, Maniyoor had a population of 12,681, of which 5,902 are males and 6,779 are females. The census town of Maniyoor covers an area of 14.02 km^{2} (5.41 sq mi) with 2,594 families residing in it. The sex ratio in Maniyoor was 1,149 higher than state average of 1,084. In Maniyoor, the population of children under 6 years was 12.6%. The overall literacy rate im Maniyoor was 93.9%, which is higher than the national average of 59% but lower than the state average of 94%.

== Religion ==
As of the 2011 Indian census, Maniyoor census town had a total population of 12,681 which consisted of 61.2% Hindus, 38.5% Muslims and 0.3% others.

== Transportation ==
The national highway passes through the town of Valapattanam. Goa and Mumbai can be accessed on the northern side and Cochin and Thiruvananthapuram can be accessed on the southern side. The road to the east of Iritty connects to Mysore and Bangalore. The nearest railway station is Kannur on the Mangalore-Palakkad line.

Trains are available to almost all parts of India subject to advance booking over the internet. There are airports at Mattanur, Mangalore and Calicut. All of them are international airports but direct flights are available only to Middle Eastern countries.
