= Vanimal =

Vanimal Baanyel
- town
- Location in Kerala, India Vanimal (India)
- Coordinates: 11°43′11.07″N 75°41′56.25″E
- Country: India
- State: Kerala
- District: Kozhikode

Population (2011)
  - Total: 25,680

Languages
  - Official: Malayalam, English
- Time zone: UTC+5:30 (IST)
- PIN: 673515/673506
- Telephone code: 0496
- Vehicle registration: KL-18
- Nearest city: Kozhikode
- Literacy: 92%
- Lok Sabha constituency: Vatakara

Vanimal or Vanimel is a village located in the Kozhikode district of Kerala, India.

== Demographics ==
As of the 2011 India census, Vanimal had a population of 25,680 with 12,368 males and 13,312 females.

== Politics ==
Vanimal is a part of Nadapuram assembly constituency, which is part of Vatakara (Lok Sabha constituency).

== Gallery ==
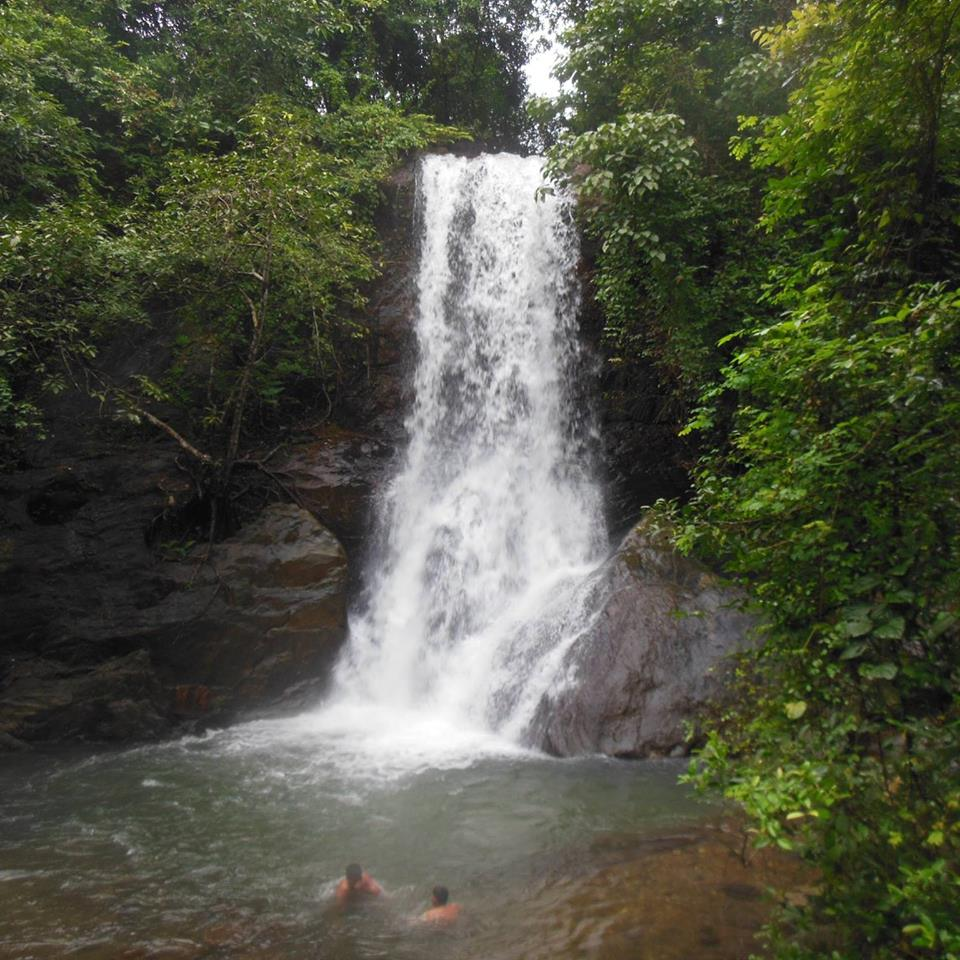
Thirikakkayam Falls
