= Kanthalad =

Kallanode
- village
- Interactive map of Kallanode
- Country: India
- State: Kerala
- District: Kozhikode

Population (2011)
  - Total: 10,003

Languages
  - Official: Malayalam, English
- Time zone: UTC+5:30 (IST)
- Vehicle registration: KL-

Kanthalad is a village in Kozhikode district in the state of Kerala, India.

== Demographics ==
At the 2011 India census, Kanthalad had a population of 10,003 with 4,736 males and 5,267 females.

== Transportation ==
Kanthalad village connects to other parts of India through Vatakara town on the west and Kuttiady town on the east. National highway No.66 passes through Vatakara and the northern stretch connects to Mangalore, Goa and Mumbai. The southern stretch connects to Cochin and Trivandrum. The eastern National Highway No.54 going through Kuttiady connects to Mananthavady, Mysore and Bangalore. The nearest airports are at Kannur and Kozhikode. The nearest railway station is at Vatakara.
