= Kedavoor =

- village
- Location in Kerala, India Kedavoor (India)
- Coordinates: 11°25′0″N 75°56′0″E
- Country: India
- State: Kerala
- District: Kozhikode

Population (2011)
  - Total: 15,336

Languages
  - Official: Malayalam, English
- Time zone: UTC+5:30 (IST)

Kedavoor is a village in Kozhikode district in the Indian state of Kerala.

== Demographics ==
As of 2011 India census, Kedavoor had a population of 15336 with 7554 males and 7782 females.
