= Kozhikode district =

District of Kerala state, India

- District
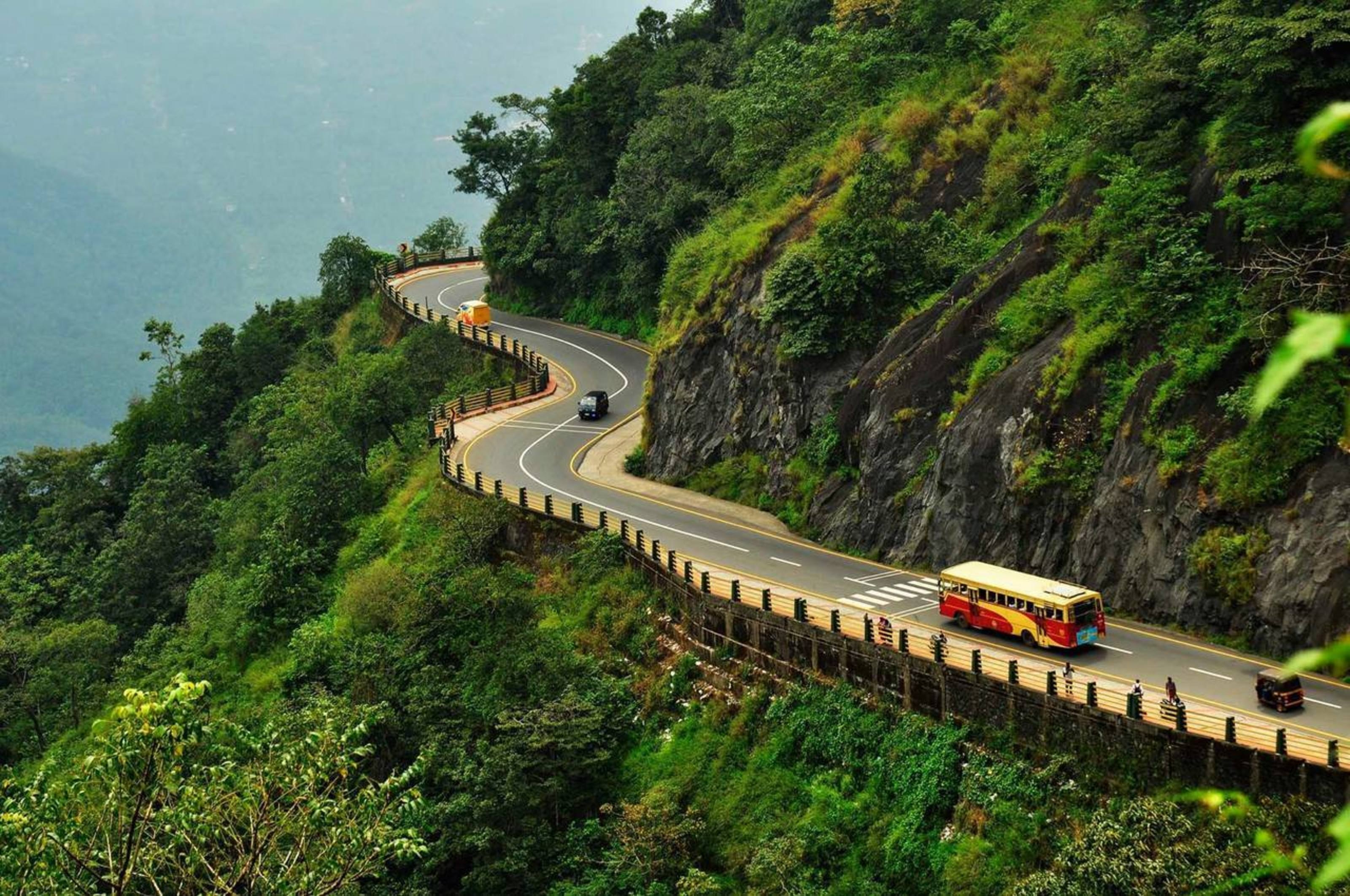
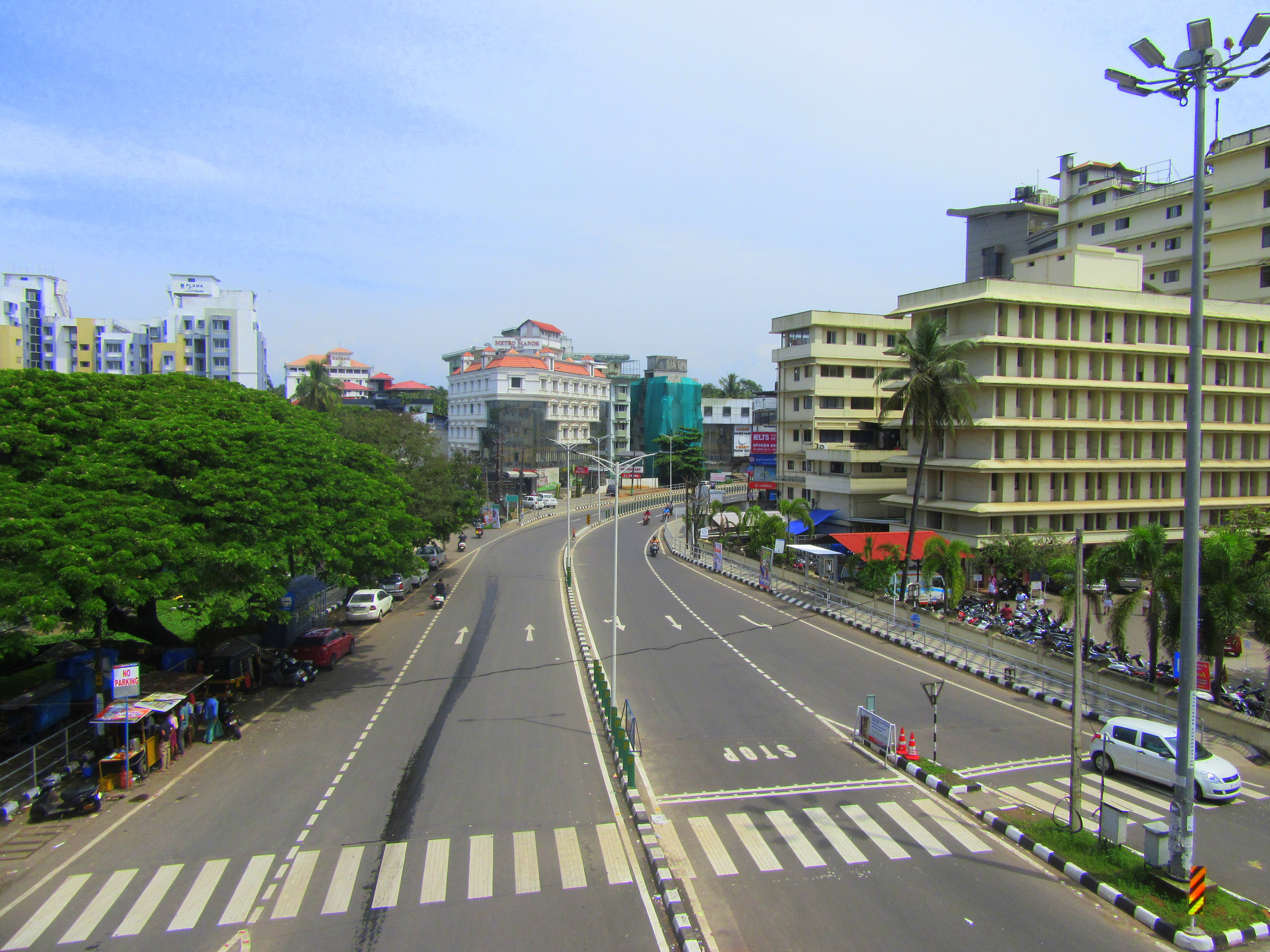
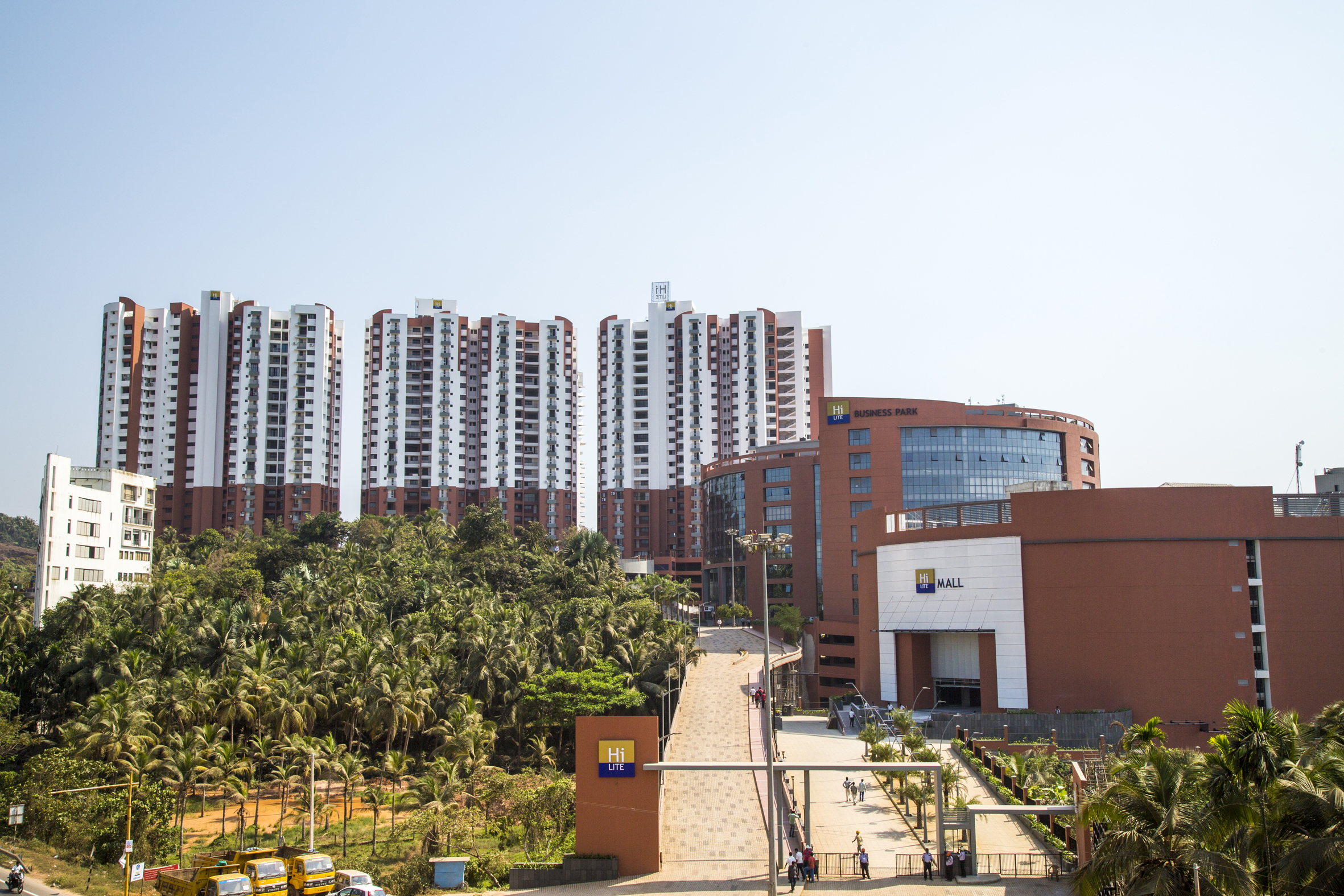
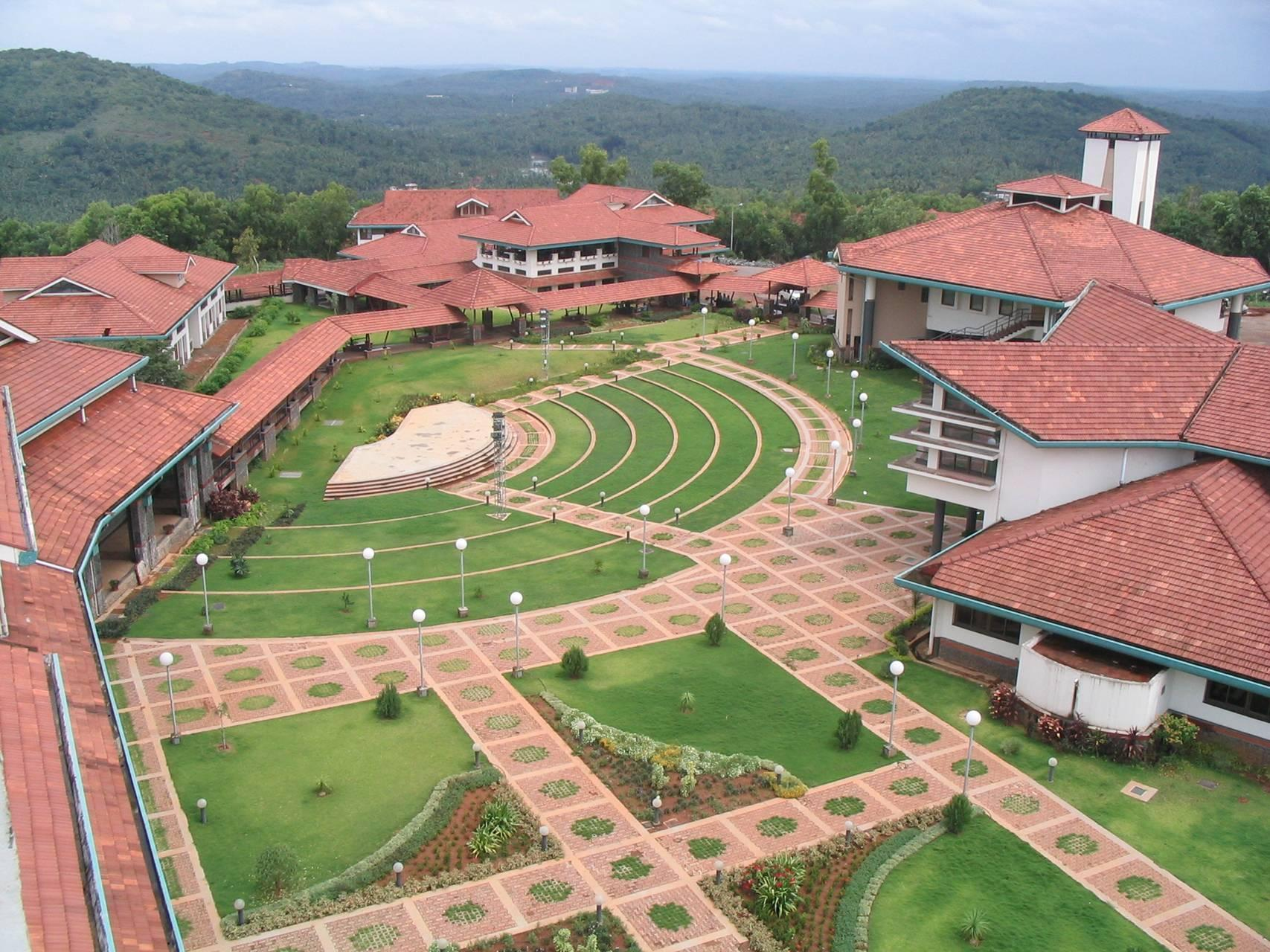
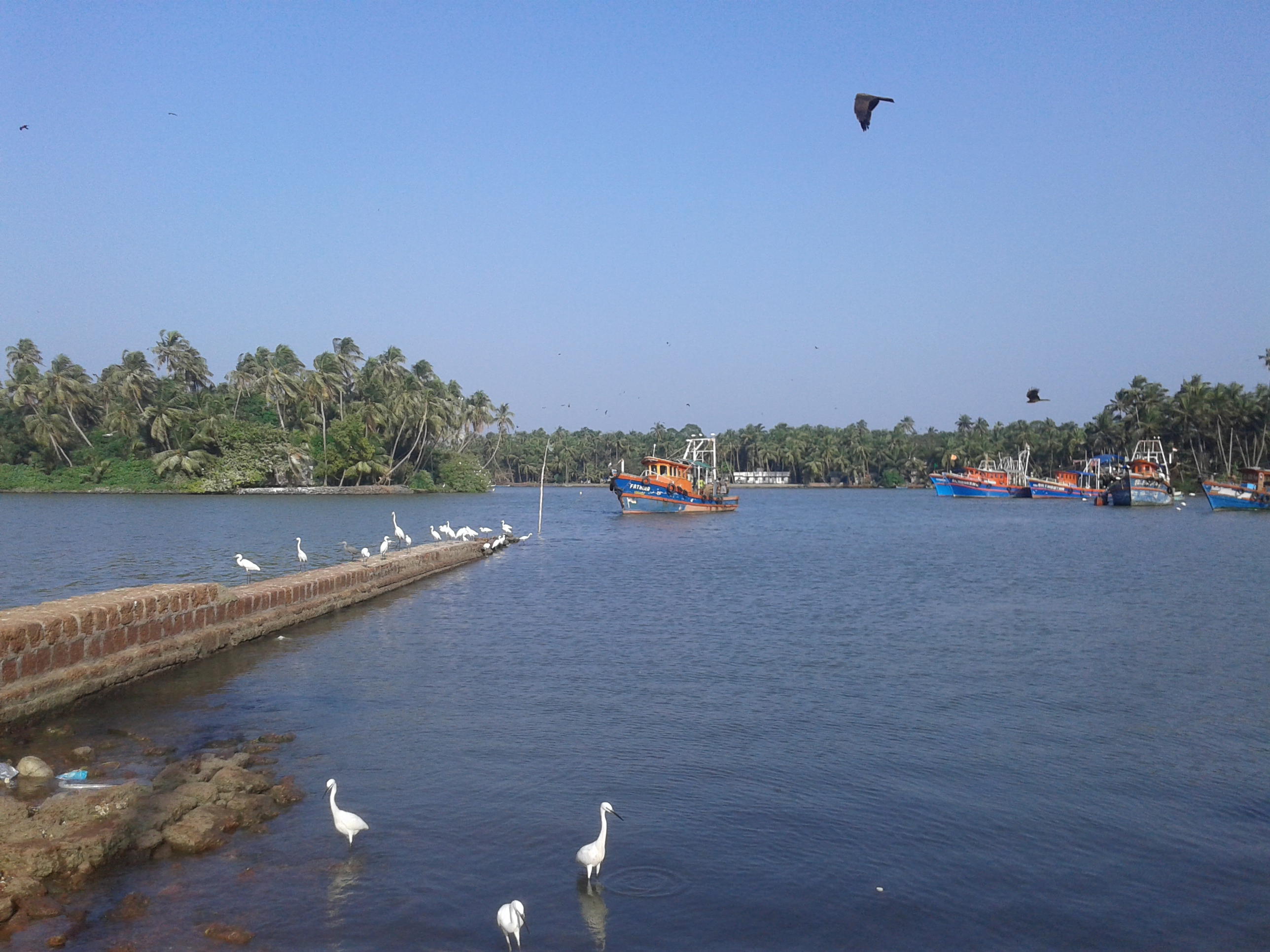
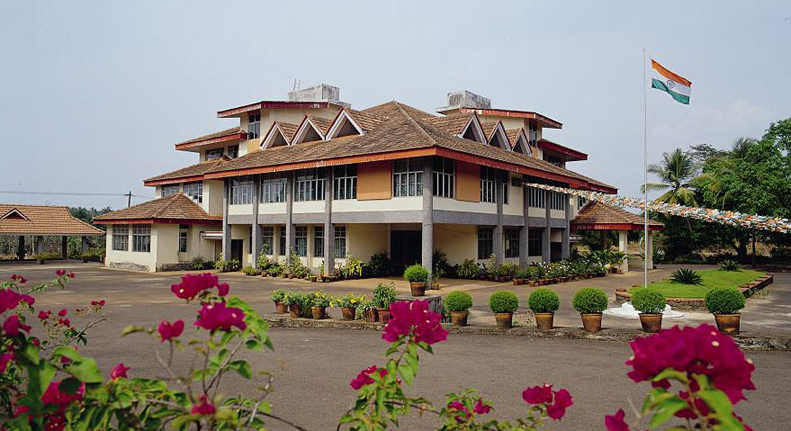
- Clockwise from top:, KSRTC bus stand complex, Hilite Mall, Chaliyam harbour, Administrative block of NIT Calicut, IIM Kozhikode, Calicut Mini Bypass, and Thamarassery Churam.
- Interactive map of Kozhikode district
- Coordinates: 11.25°N 75.77°E
- Country: India
- State: Kerala
- Headquarters: Kozhikode
- Subdivisions: Revenue Divisions: 2: Kozhikode; Vatakara; Taluks: 4: Kozhikkode; Vatakara; Koyilandy; Thamarassery

Government
  - Collector: Snehil Kumar Singh
  - District Panchayat President: Sheeja Sasi CPI (M)
  - Members of Parliament: M. K. Raghavan; Shafi Parambil; Priyanka Gandhi

Area
  - Total: 2,344 km^{2} (905 sq mi)
  - Rank: 9th
- Highest elevation (Vavul Mala): 2,339 m (7,674 ft)

Population (2018)
  - Total: 3,249,761
  - Density: 1,386/km^{2} (3,590/sq mi)

Languages
  - Official: Malayalam, English
- Time zone: UTC+5:30 (IST)
- Postal code: 673---
- ISO 3166 code: IN-KL
- Vehicle registration: KL-11 Calicut City, KL-18 Vatakara, KL-56 Koyilandy, KL-57 Koduvally, KL-76 Nanmanda, KL-77 Perambra, KL-85 Ramanattukara (Feroke)
- HDI (2005): ▲0.781 ( High)
- Official Tree; Official Flower; Official Animal; Official Bird; Official Butterfly; Official Heritage Tree; Official Aquatic Animal; Official Fish: Theyyakam; Athirani; Indian Pangolin; Meniponman; Malabar rose; Eenthu; Otter; Pathala Poontharakan
- Website: kozhikode.nic.in

Kozhikode district (pronounced [koːɻikːoːɖɨ̆]), is one of the 14 districts in the Indian state of Kerala, along its southwestern Malabar Coast. The city of Kozhikode, also known as Calicut, is the district headquarters.

The Kozhikode Municipal Corporation has a corporation limit population of 609,224 and a metropolitan population of more than 2 million, making Kozhikode metropolitan area the second-largest in Kerala and the 19th largest in India. Kozhikode is classified as a Tier 2 city by the Government of India. NIT Calicut, NIEIT and IIM Kozhikode are institutions of national importance located in the district.

Kozhikode is the largest city in the erstwhile Malabar District and acted as its headquarters during British Raj. In antiquity and the medieval period, Kozhikode was dubbed the City of Spices for its role as the major trading point for Indian spices. It was the capital of an independent kingdom ruled by the Samoothiris (Zamorins), which was also the largest kingdom in Kerala prior to the expansion of Travancore in the mid-18th century CE. The port at Kozhikode acted as the gateway to medieval South Indian coast for the Chinese, the Arabs, the Portuguese, the Dutch and finally the British.

Kozhikode district is bordered by the districts of Kannur and Mahé (Puducherry) to the north, Wayanad to the east, and Malappuram to the south. The Arabian Sea lies to the west and the Western Ghats mountain range stretches towards the east. Vavul Mala, a 2,339 m high peak situated on the trijunction of Kozhikode, Malappuram, and Wayanad districts, is the highest point of elevation in the district. It lies between latitudes 11° 08'N and 11° 50'N and longitudes 75° 30'E and 76° 8'E. The Thamarassery Churam connects the city of Kozhikode with the plateau of Wayanad.

The district is divided into four taluks: Kozhikode, Vatakara, Koyilandy and Thamarassery. By the 2011 census there are 12 block panchayats: Balusseri, Chelannur, Koduvally, Kozhikode, Kunnamangalam, Kunnummal, Melady, Panthalayani, Perambra, Thodannur, Thuneri and Vatakara. The Multidimensional Poverty Index report prepared by NITI Aayog based on the National Family Health Survey 2015–16 declared Kozhikode as the third-least poor district in India, only after to Kottayam and Ernakulam, with a negligible multidimensional poverty rate of 0.26%.

== Etymology ==
The exact origin of the name Kozhikode is uncertain. According to many sources, the name Kozhikode is derived from Koyil-kota (fort), meaning fortified palace. Koil or Koyil or Kovil is the Malayalam/Tamil term for a Hindu temple, referring to the Tali Shiva Temple. Both the terms kōyil and kōvil are used interchangeably. The name also got corrupted into Kolikod, or its Arab version Qāliqūṭ and later its anglicised version Calicut. The Arab merchants called it Qāliqūṭ (IPA: qˠaːliqˠːuːtˤ). Chinese merchants called it Kūlifo. Tamils called it as Kallikottai.

The city is officially named Kozhikode in Malayalam, and in English, it is known by its anglicised version, Calicut. The word calico, a fine variety of hand-woven cotton cloth that was exported from the port of Kozhikode, is thought to have been derived from Calicut. The term for tricolour cats called calico cats, is as well derived from the fabric name.

== History ==
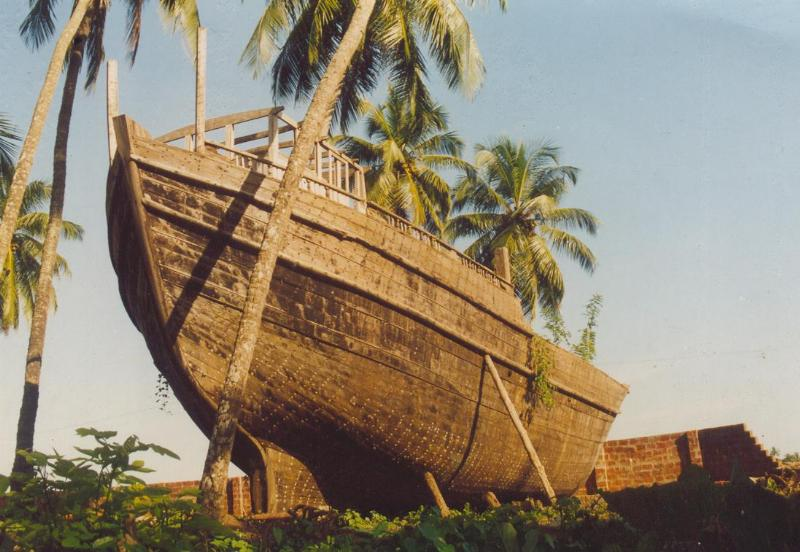
Uru, a type of ship built at Beypore, Calicut

Following the formation of Kerala in 1956, the erstwhile Malabar District was divided into three: Kannur district, Kozhikode district, and Palakkad district.

At that time, Kozhikode district had two Revenue Divisions: Kozhikode Revenue Division and Malappuram Revenue Division. Kozhikode Revenue Division had four Taluks: Vatakara, Koyilandy, Kozhikode, and South Wayanad. Malappuram Division had two Taluks: Eranad and Tirur.

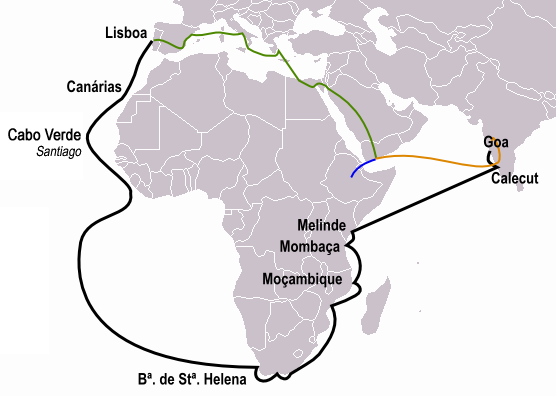
The path Vasco da Gama took to reach Kozhikode (black line) in 1498, which was also the discovery of a sea route from Europe to India, and eventually paved way for the European colonisation of Indian subcontinent.

On 16 June 1969, Malappuram Revenue Division of Kozhikode district excluding three Revenue villages, Feroke, Ramanattukara, and Kadalundi, was separated to form Malappuram district.

Again on 1 November 1980, the South Wayanad Taluk of Kozhikode district was separated to form Wayanad district.

== Demographics ==
Historical population
Year	Pop.	±% p.a.
1901	610,058	—
1911	654,846	+0.71%
1921	678,122	+0.35%
1931	796,881	+1.63%
1941	892,078	+1.13%
1951	1,116,391	+2.27%
1961	1,403,413	+2.31%
1971	1,821,734	+2.64%
1981	2,245,265	+2.11%
1991	2,619,941	+1.56%
2001	2,879,131	+0.95%
2011	3,086,293	+0.70%
2018	3,249,761	+0.74%

(Details for 'Kozhikode Urban' retrieved from Census of India.)

According to the 2018 Statistics Report, Kozhikode district has a population of 3,249,761, roughly equal to the nation of Mongolia or the US state of Iowa. 2011 Census of India gives the district a ranking of 115th in India (out of a total of 640). Its population growth rate over the decade 2001–2011 was 7.31%. Kozhikode has a sex ratio of 1097 females for every 1000 males, and a literacy rate of 95.24%. 67.15% of the population lives in urban areas. Scheduled Castes and Scheduled Tribes make up 6.45% and 0.49% of the population respectively.

The Kozhikode metropolitan area has a population of more than 2 million, making it the second-largest in Kerala and the 19th largest in India. 67.15% of the total population of Kozhikode district live in urban areas (which includes Municipal Corporations, Municipalities, and Census Towns), according to the 2011 Census of India.

The Multidimensional Poverty Index report prepared by NITI Aayog based on the National Family Health Survey 2015–16 declared Kozhikode as the third-least poor district in India, only after to Kottayam and Ernakulam, with a negligible multidimensional poverty rate of 0.26%.

Malayalam is the predominant language, spoken by 99.05% of the population. Small minorities speak Tamil and Hindi, mainly in urban areas.

=== Religion ===
Religions in Kozhikode district (2011)
1. Hinduism (56.2%)
2. Islam (39.2%)
3. Christianity (4.26%)
4. Other or not stated (0.00%)

According to the 2011 census, Hindus constitute the majority of the population, followed by Muslims and Christians. The proportion in the 2011 census was 56.21% Hindus; 39.24% Muslims and 4.26% Christians. Major houses of worship include Thali Mahadeva Kshethram at Palayam, Muchunthi Palli at Kuttichira and Catholic church at Mananchira.

There is a small presence of Jains (601), Sikhs (297), and Buddhists (235).

== Climate ==
The district has a generally humid climate with a very hot season extending from March to May. The rainy season is during the South West Monsoon, which sets in the first week of June and extends up to September. The North East Monsoon extends from the second half of October through November. The average annual rainfall is 3,266 millimetres or 129 inches. The best weather is found in towards the end of the year, in December and January – the skies are clear, and the air is crisp. The highest temperature recorded was 39.4 °C or 102.9 °F in March 1975. The lowest was 14 °C or 57.2 °F recorded on 26 December 1975.

Climate data for Kozhikode
Month	Jan	Feb	Mar	Apr	May	Jun	Jul	Aug	Sep	Oct	Nov	Dec	Year
Mean daily maximum °C (°F)	31.6 (88.9)	32.0 (89.6)	32.7 (90.9)	33.1 (91.6)	32.4 (90.3)	29.4 (84.9)	28.4 (83.1)	28.3 (82.9)	29.5 (85.1)	30.6 (87.1)	31.3 (88.3)	31.6 (88.9)	30.9 (87.6)
Mean daily minimum °C (°F)	22 (72)	23.4 (74.1)	25 (77)	26.1 (79.0)	25.8 (78.4)	24 (75)	23.5 (74.3)	23.5 (74.3)	24 (75)	24 (75)	23.6 (74.5)	22.7 (72.9)	23.8 (74.8)
Average rainfall mm (inches)	2.7 (0.11)	3.4 (0.13)	21.4 (0.84)	90.2 (3.55)	310.9 (12.24)	818.2 (32.21)	902.5 (35.53)	447.3 (17.61)	233.4 (9.19)	263.5 (10.37)	136.6 (5.38)	35 (1.4)	3,265.1 (128.56)

== Administration ==
The headquarters of the district administration is Kozhikode Civil Station in West Hill. The district administration is headed by the District collector. He is assisted by deputy collectors with responsibility for general matters, land acquisition, revenue recovery, land reforms, and elections.

=== Urban Local Bodies ===
There are seven municipal towns in the district, in addition to the Kozhikode Municipal Corporation, which was established in 1962 as the second municipal corporation in Kerala after Trivandrum. The district's municipal towns are:

Urban local bodies in Kozhikode district
Municipality	Population (2011)	Area(km^{2})	Population density (/km^{2})	Taluk
Vatakara	75,295	21.32	3,532	Vatakara
Koyilandy	71,873	29.05	2,474	Koyilandy
Feroke	54,074	15.54	3,480	Kozhikode
Payyoli	49,470	22.34	2,214	Koyilandy
Koduvally	48,687	23.85	2,041	Thamarassery
Mukkam	40,670	31.20	1,304	Kozhikode
Ramanattukara	35,937	11.70	3,072	Kozhikode

=== Legislative representation ===
A map of 13 Kerala Legislative Assembly constituencies from Kozhikode district with their limits

There are three Lok Sabha constituency in Kozhikode: Vatakara, Kozhikode, and Wayanad.

There are 13 Kerala Legislative Assembly seats in Kozhikode district.

Kerala Legislative Assembly Constituencies from Kozhikode district (2021)
Constituency	Member	Party	Alliance
Vatakara	K. K. Rema	RMPI	UDF
Kuttiady	K. P. Kunhahammed Kutty	CPI(M)	LDF
Nadapuram	E. K. Vijayan	CPI	LDF
Koyilandy	Kanathil Jameela	CPI(M)	LDF
Perambra	T. P. Ramakrishnan	CPI(M)	LDF
Balussery	K. M. Sachin Dev	CPI(M)	LDF
Elathur	A. K. Saseendran	NCP	LDF
Kozhikode North	Thottathil Ravindran	CPI(M)	LDF
Kozhikode South	Ahamed Devarkovil	INL	LDF
Beypore	P. A. Mohammed Riyas	CPI(M)	LDF
Kunnamangalam	P. T. A. Rahim	LDF Ind.	LDF
Koduvally	M. K. Muneer	IUML	UDF
Thiruvambady	Linto Joseph	CPI(M)	LDF

=== Administrative divisions ===
Revenue division	Taluk	Area (km^{2})	Population (2011)	Number of villages	Towns	Revenue villages
Vatkara	Vatakara	576	687,726	28	Vadakara; Nadapuram; Kuttiady; Chorode; Eramala; Vanimal; Azhiyur	Ayanchery; Azhiyur; Chekkiad; Chorode; Edachery; Eramala; Kavilumpara; Kayakody; Kottappally; Kunnummal; Kuttiady; Maniyoor; Maruthonkara; Nadakkuthazha; Nadapuram; Narippatta; Onchiam; Palayad; Purameri; Thinoor; Thiruvallur; Thuneri; Vatakara; Valayam; Vanimel; Velom; Vilangad; Villiappally
Vatkara	Koyilandy	642	645,879	31	Koyilandi; Chemancheri; Ulliyeri; Balussery; Perambra	Arikkulam; Atholi; Avitanallur; Balussery; Chakkittapara; Changaroth; Chemancheri; Chempanoda; Chengottukavu; Cheruvannur; Eravattur; Iringal; Kayanna; Keezhariyur; Koorachundu; Koothali; Kottur; Kozhukkallur; Menhannyam; Meppayur; Moodadi; Naduvannur; Nochad; Palery; Panthalayany; Payyoli; Perambra; Thikkodi; Thurayur; Ulliyeri; Viyyur
Kozhikode	Thamarassery	574	401,831	20	Thamarassery; Thiruvambady; Koodaranji; Koduvally; Kodencheri; Omassery; Poonoor	Engapuzha; Kanthalad; Kattippara; Kinalur; Kizhakkoth; Kodencheri; Koduvally; Kedavoor; Koodaranji; Koodathayi; Narikkuni; Nellipoyil; Panangad; Puthuppadi; Puthur; Raroth; Sivapuram; Thiruvambady; Unnikulam; Vavad
Kozhikode	Kozhikode	547	1,354,107	39	Kozhikode; Kadalundi; Feroke; Ramanattukara; Mukkam; Kunnamangalam; Beypore	Beypore; Chathamangalam; Chelannur; Celavoor; Cheruvannur; Chevayoor; Elathur; Feroke; Kacheri; Kadalundi; N. N. Kakkad; Kakkodi; Kakkur; Karuvanthuruthy; Kasaba; Kodiyathur; Kottooli; Kumaranallur; Kunnamangalam; Parambil Bazar; Kuttikkattoor and Velliparamba; Madavoor; Mavoor; Nagaram; Nanmanda; Neeleshwaram; Nellikode Bhaskaran; Olavanna; Panniyankara; Pantheeramkavu; Perumanna; Peruvayal; Poolacode; Puthuyangadi; Ramanattukara; Thalakkulathur; Thazhekode; Valayanad; Vengeri

== Economy ==
Kozhikode was the capital city of the erstwhile Malabar District

Kozhikode is one of the largest economic hubs in Kerala. Being home to about 8% of the state's population, the district contributes more than 12% to the state's income. Nedungadi Bank, the first and oldest bank in the modern state of Kerala, was established by Appu Nedungadi at Kozhikode in the year 1899. Cyberpark at Kozhikode is one of IT hubs in Kerala. The economy of Kozhikode significantly depends upon its Service sector.

== Culture ==
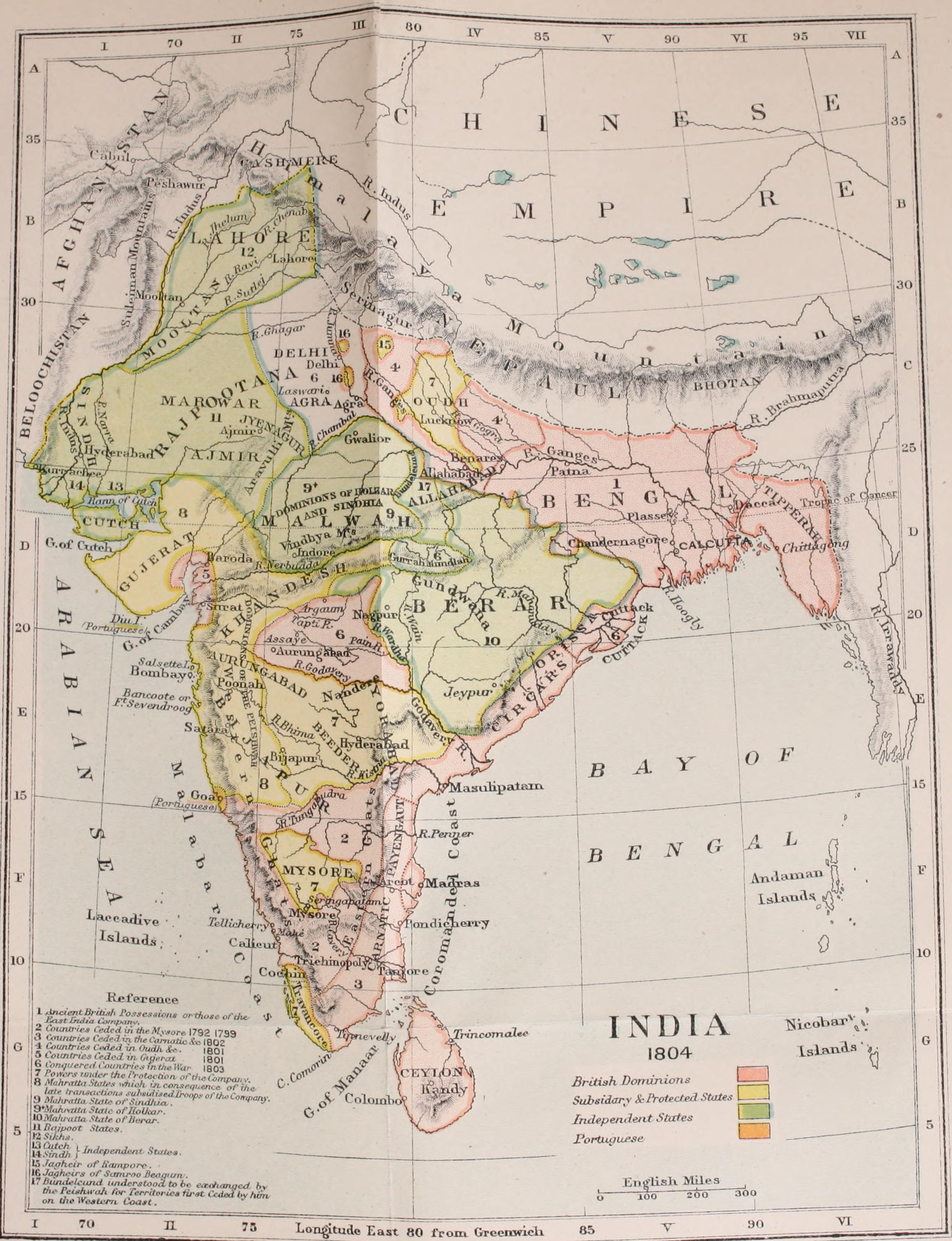
An old map of India in 1804. Note that only Thalassery, Kozhikode, and Kochi, are marked as cities within the present-day state of Kerala

=== Malayalam language ===
In the field of Malayalam language and literature, Kozhikode district has made many significant contributions. During the 17th century, His Highness Sri Samoothiri Manavedan Maharaja authored the famous Krishnattam, a Manipravalam text describing the childhood of Lord Krishna in eight volumes. The district is famous for folk songs or ballads known as Vadakkan Pattukal. The most popular songs celebrate the exploits of Thacholi Othenan and Unniyarcha. An intellectual debate for Vedic scholars, where winners receive the title of Pattathanam, takes place at Thali temple during the month of Thulam. Kozhikode also has a strong associations with ghazals and football.

=== Malayalam literature ===
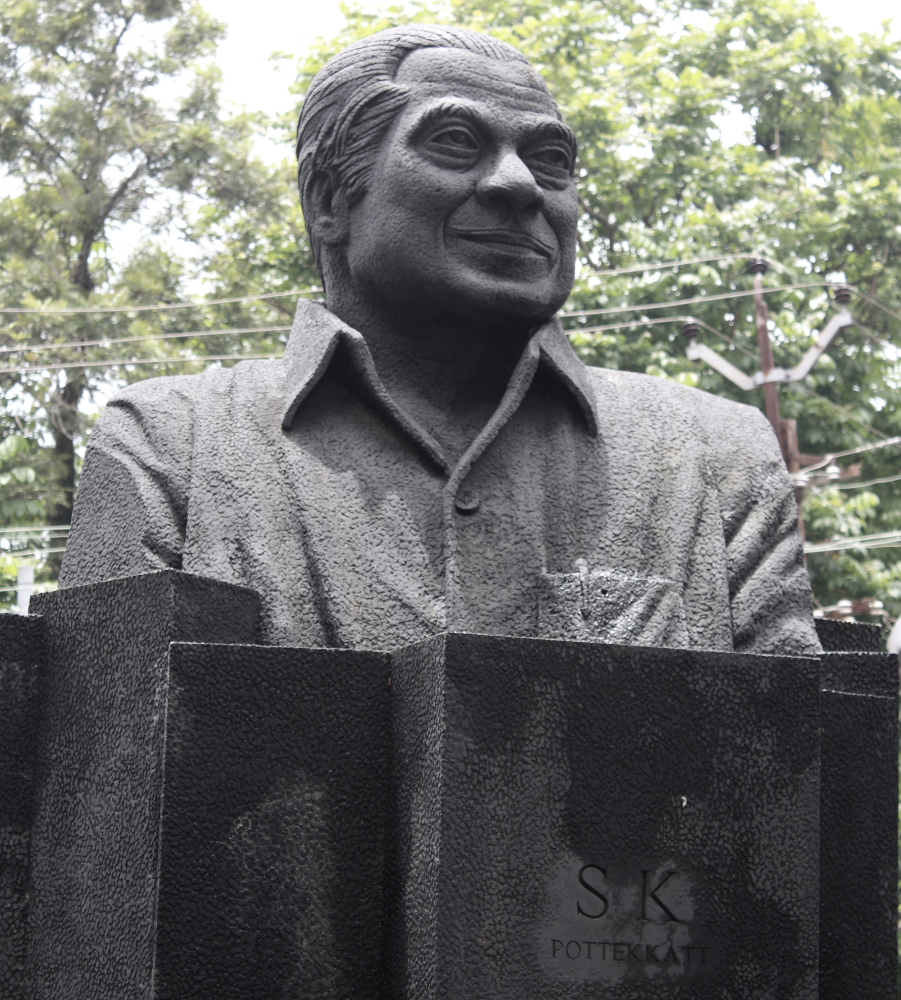
A bust of S. K. Pottekkatt facing S.M. Street in Kozhikode

Many prominent writers of Malayalam literature hail from Kozhikode district. Among them are S. K. Pottekkatt, Thikkodiyan, Punathil Kunjabdulla, U. A. Khader, Akbar Kakkattil, N. N. Kakkad, P. Valsala and M. N. Karassery. S. K. Pottekkatt was perhaps the most celebrated writer from Kozhikode whose award-winning work Oru Theruvinte Katha is set in S. M. Street. Several leading Malayalam publishing houses are based in the city, including Poorna, Mathrubhumi, Mulberry, Lipi and Olive. Several libraries are located in and around the city. The Kozhikode Public Library and Research Centre at Mananchira was constructed in 1996. In 2023, Kozhikode became India's first UNESCO City of Literature.

=== Music ===
In addition to the Malabar Mahotsavam, the annual cultural fest of Kozhikode, every year since 1981 the Tyagaraja Aradhana Trust has been conducting a five-day music festival in honour of Tyagaraja. The festival is complete with the Uncchavritti, rendering of Divyanama kritis, Pancharatna Kritis, concerts by professional artistes and students of music from morning to late in the evening.

Kozhikode has a tradition of Ghazal and Hindustani music appreciation. There are many Malayalam Ghazals. The late film director and play back singer M. S. Baburaj, from Kozhikode was influenced by Ghazal and Hindustani.

There are DJ parties and events that are held in hotels and malls and pubs and IT parks in Calicut. Ragam and Thatva fest in NITC and different fests in IIM gets participation of international bands.

=== Cuisine ===
Kozhikode offers a variety of South Indian, North Indian, European, Chinese, Arab, Gujarati and Jain food. The culinary culture of the city has been moulded by Portuguese, Dutch, French, British, Arab and other Indian influence. It offers both veg and non-veg dishes in great variety. The mall culture in the city has gained momentum and fast foods are very popular. The new generation is more inclined to Chinese, Arab and American food culture and a new trend of vegetarianism is getting popular because of health concerns. The city is also famous for Haluva called as Sweet Meat by Europeans due to the texture of the sweet. Kozhikode has a main road in the town named S. M. Street (Mittayi Theruvu). It derived this name from the numerous Halwa stores which used to dot the street. The history of this Street dates back to time of the Zamorin of Calicut, when the ruler invited Gujarati sweetmeat makers to set up shop in the city and accommodated their shops just outside the palace walls. Another speciality is banana chips, which are made crisp and wafer-thin. Other popular dishes include seafood preparations (prawns, mussels, mackerel) . Vegetarian fare includes the sadya.

=== Films ===
The film history of Kozhikode dates back to 1950s. Some of the main production companies of Malayalam films like Grihalakshmi Productions, Kalpaka and Swargachitra are based in Kozhikode. The city was also an important hub of prominent filmmakers like I. V. Sasi and T. Damodaran. Kozhikode produced such notable actors as K. P. Ummer, Mammukoya, Balan K. Nair, Santha Devi and Kuthiravattam Pappu. The evergreen musician Baburaj, lyricist Gireesh Puthenchery, filmmakers Ranjith, V. M. Vinu, A. Vincent, Shajoon Kariyal and Anjali Menon, and cinematographer P. S. Nivas also hail from Kozhikode. Some of the other cine actors like Nellikode Bhaskaran, Augustine, Madhupal, Anoop Menon, Neeraj Madhav and Vijayan Malaparamba are from Kozhikode.

The 1947 Douglas Fairbanks Jr. Hollywood thriller, Sinbad the Sailor, mentions Kozhikode.

Kozhikode, the largest city in the Malabar region, also has a vital role in the entertainment segment. The city's first theatre, Calicut Crown, was opened as early as 1925. The city has more than 10 theatres and two multiplexes, the PVS Film City (the first multiplex in Malabar region) and Crown Theatre.

=== Sports ===
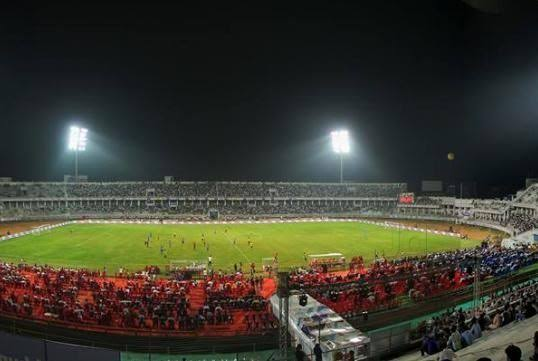
EMS Stadium

Kozhikode is known as the second Mecca of football (after Kolkata). The other most popular games in Kozhikode are cricket, football, basketball, badminton and volleyball. The EMS Stadium hosted many international football matches of major football teams in the past. The city is home to many international footballers. One of the famous was Olympian Abdurahman who played for the nation in many international games including Melbourne Olympic games. K.P. Sethu Madhavan, Premnath Phillips, Muhamad Najeeb, M Prasannan, Sudheer etc. are some international footballers from Kozhikode. The seven-a-side form of football is also very famous in the city. P. T. Usha, is a famous athlete who is regarded as one of the greatest athletes India has ever produced and is often called the "queen of Indian track and field". She is nicknamed Payyoli Express. Currently she runs the Usha School of Athletics at Koyilandy in Kerala. T. Abdul Rahman, popularly known as Olympian Rahman, was an Indian Olympian footballer from Kozhikode. Rahman was a member of the Indian team that reached the semi-final in 1956 Melbourne Olympics. Other sports personalities include Jimmy George, Tom Joseph (Indian volleyball player and was captain of Indian volleyball team) and Premnath Phillips. Jaseel P. Ismail, V. Diju, Aparna Balan & Arun Vishnu are international badminton players from the city. The Sports & Education Promotion Trust (SEPT) was established to promote sports development in India with focus on football. Started in 2004 and based in Kozhikode, the trust has set up 52 centres called "football nurseries" spread across thirteen districts in Kerala. Since 2010, Calicut Mini Marathon runs have been organised by IIM Kozhikode and witness participation of around 7000 people every year.

=== Radio ===
The Kozhikode radio station of All India Radio has two transmitters: Kozhikode AM (100 kilowatt) and Kozhikode FM [Vividh Bharathi] (10 kilowatt). Private FM radio stations: Radio Mango 91.9 operated by Malayala Manorama Co. Ltd. and Red FM 93.5 of the SUN Network. AIR FM radio station: Kozhikode – 103.6 MHz; AIR MW radio station: Kozhikode – 684 kHz.

=== Television ===
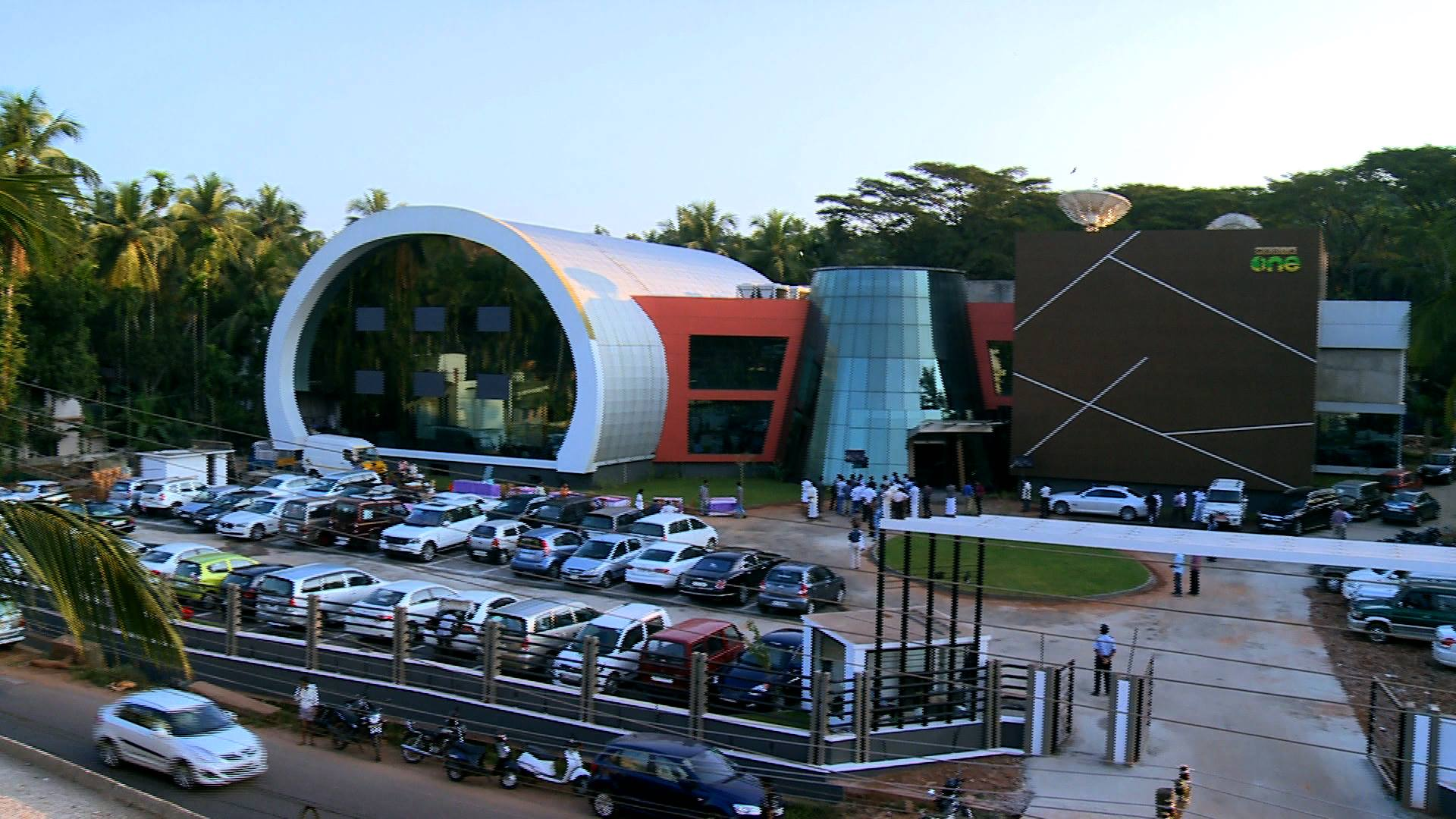
The headquarters and studio of MediaOne TV at Velliparamba, Kozhikode

A television transmitter has been functioning in Kozhikode since 3 July 1984, relaying programmes from Delhi and Thiruvananthapuram Doordarshan. Doordarshan has its broadcasting centre in Kozhikode located at Medical College. The Malayalam channels based on Kozhikode are the Shalom Television, Darshana TV and Media One TV. All major channels in Malayalam viz. Manorama News, Asianet, Surya TV, Kairali TV, Amrita TV, Jeevan TV, Indiavision and Jaihind have their studios and news bureaus in the city. Satellite television services are available through DD Direct+, Dish TV, Sun Direct DTH and Tata Sky. Asianet Cable Vision popularly known as ACV telecasts daily city news. Spidernet is another local channel. Other local operators include KCL and Citinet.

The Calicut Press Club came into existence in 1970. It is the nerve centre of all media activities, both print and electronic. Began with around 70 members in the roll, this Press Club, over the years, became a prestigious and alert media centre in the state with a present membership of over 280.

== Transport ==
=== Air ===
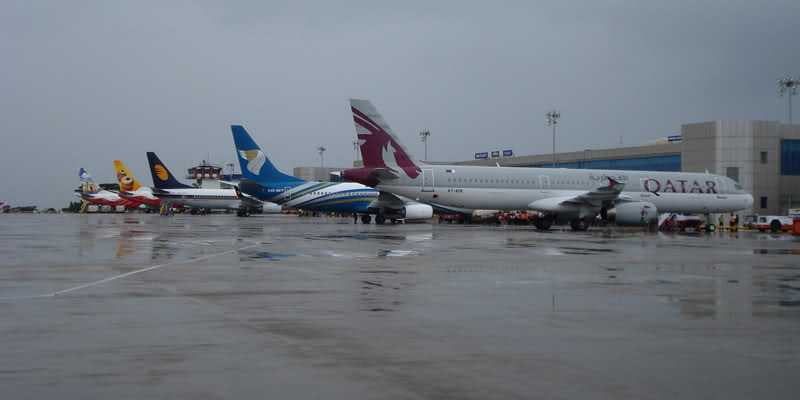
Flights Parked at Calicut Airport

Kozhikode is served by Calicut International Airport (IATA: CCJ, ICAO: VOCL) located at Karipur in Malappuram District, about 28 kilometres (17 miles) from Kozhikode city. The airport started operation in April 1988. It has two terminals, one for domestic flights and second for international flights.

=== Road ===
Kozhikode is well connected by road. NH 66 and NH 766 connects Calicut to rest of India. It has bus services to all parts of Kerala, Karnataka, Tamil Nadu and to important cities like Hyderabad and Mumbai.. New national highway is planned from Calicut to Bangalore.

== Notable people ==
Literature

- S. K. Pottekkatt
- M. T. Vasudevan Nair
- Thikkodiyan
- N. P. Mohammed
- Punathil Kunjabdulla
- U. A. Khader
- Akbar Kakkattil
- N. N. Kakkad
- P. Valsala
- N. P. Hafiz Mohamad
- M. N. Karassery

Politics

- V. K. Krishna Menon
- John Matthai
- K. P. Unnikrishnan

Industry

- Verghese Kurien

Music

- M. S. Baburaj
- Gireesh Puthenchery

Film

- Surabhi Lakshmi
- I. V. Sasi
- T. Damodaran
- Ummer
- Mammukoya
- Balan K. Nair
- Santha Devi
- Parvathy Thiruvothu
- Kuthiravattam Pappu
- Ranjith
- V. M. Vinu
- A. Vincent
- Shajoon Kariyal
- Anjali Menon
- P. S. Nivas
- Neeraj Madhav
- Madhupal
- Anoop Menon
- Nellikode Bhaskaran
- Augustine

Sports

- T. Abdul Rahman
- P. T. Usha
- Jaseel P. Ismail
- V. Diju
- Aparna Balan
- Arun Vishnu
- Tom Joseph
- Roy Joseph
- Mayookha Johny
- Prasanth Karuthadathkuni
- Jinson Johnson
- Kishor Kumar
- Rehenesh TP
- Muhammed Nemil
- Gani Nigam
- Leon Augustine

Others

- Ali Manikfan
- M. P. Ahammed

== See also ==
- Kozhikode(City)
- Malabar
- Zamorin
- Vasco da Gama
