= Azhiyur =

Azhiyoor
- village
- Location in Kerala, India Azhiyoor (India)
- Coordinates: 11°41′0″N 75°32′0″E
- Country: India
- State: Kerala
- District: Kozhikode

Area
  - Total: 9.77 km^{2} (3.77 sq mi)

Population (2011)
  - Total: 30,023
  - Density: 3,070/km^{2} (7,960/sq mi)

Languages
  - Official: Malayalam, English
- Time zone: UTC+5:30 (IST)
- PIN: 673309
- ISO 3166 code: IN-KL-11
- Vehicle registration: KL-18
- Nearest city: Kozhikode
- Website: lsgkerala.in/azhiyoorpanchayat/

Azhiyoor is a village in Vatakara taluk of Kozhikode district in the state of Kerala, India. Azhiyur is part of the Greater Mahé Region..

== Demographics ==
As of 2011 India census, Azhiyur had a population of 30,023, with 13,595 males and 16,428 females. It is situated close to Mayyazhi (Mahe).

L
