= Raroth =

- village
- Location in Kerala, India Raroth (India)
- Coordinates: 11.450400°N 75.930570°E
- Country: India
- State: Kerala
- District: Kozhikode

Population (2011)
  - Total: 33,286

Languages
  - Official: Malayalam, English
- Time zone: UTC+5:30 (IST)
- PIN: 6XXXXX
- Vehicle registration: KL-

Raroth is a village in Kozhikode district in the state of Kerala, India.

== Demographics ==
As of 2011 India census, Raroth had a total population of 33,286, with 16,016 males and 17,270 females.
