= Thalakkulathur =

- village
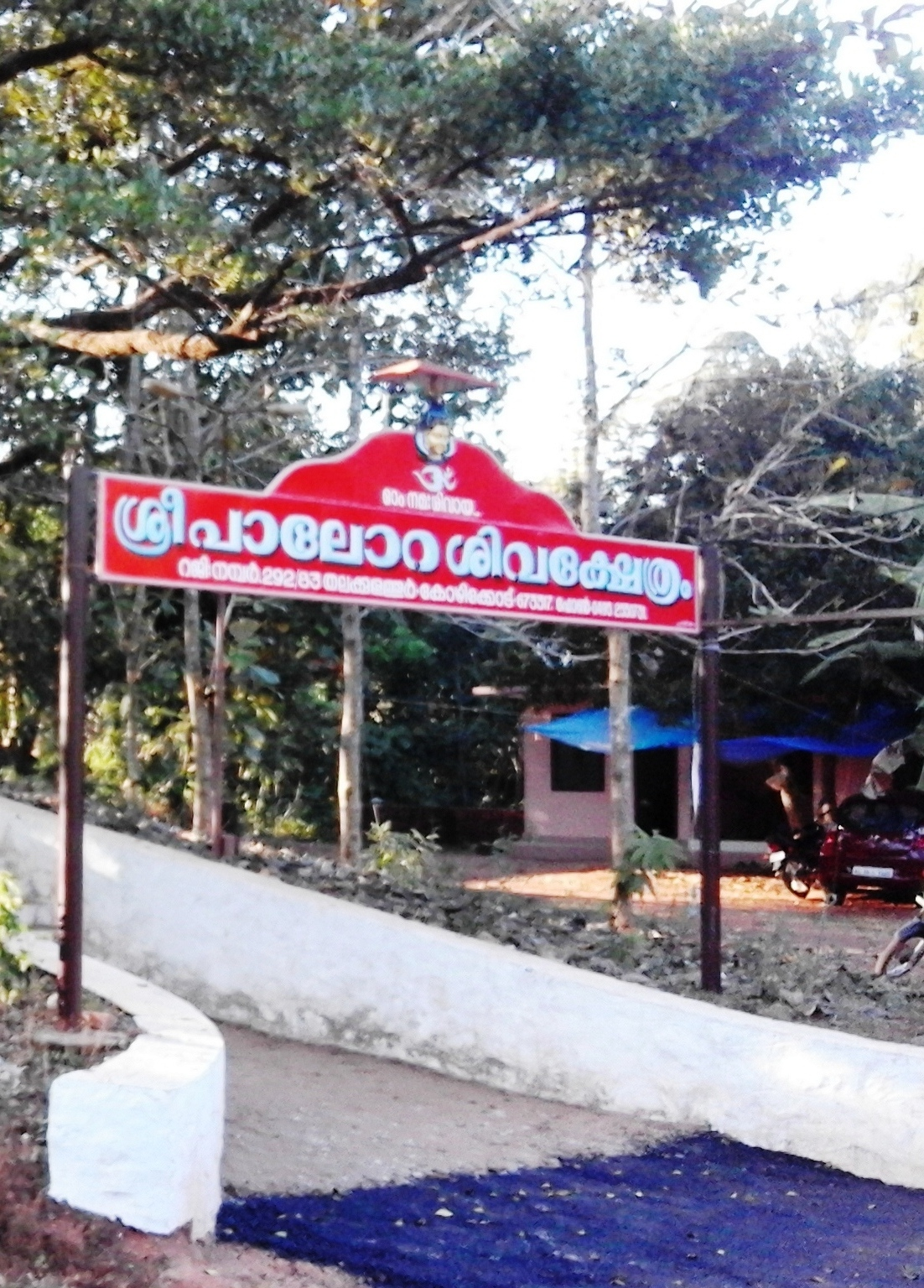
- Palora Shiva Temple, Purakkattiri

- Location in Kerala, India Thalakkulathur (India)
- Coordinates: 11°21′10″N 75°45′40″E
- Country: India
- State: Kerala
- District: Kozhikode

Population (2011)
  - Total: 29,388

Languages
  - Official: Malayalam, English
- Time zone: UTC+5:30 (IST)
- PIN: 673317
- Vehicle registration: KL-76
- Website: https://www.facebook.com/palorasivakshethram/

Thalakkulathur is a small village near Kozhikode city, along the road to Atholi, in the state of Kerala.

== Demographics ==
As of 2011 India census, Thalakkulathur had a population of 29,388, with 13,753 males and 15,635 females.

== Notable people ==
- Mithun Vijay Kumar, a renowned political commentator, has his ancestral home in Thalakkulathur.

== History ==
Thalakkulthur is supposed to have got this name from the pond used for ritualistic purposes by the priests of Zamorin dynasty located here.

== Temples ==
1. Vazhani Temple
2. Thalakkulathoor Temple
3. Vellikkulangara Temple
4. Palora Shiva Temple
5. Itharakkuni Shiva Temple
6. Mattath Shiva Temple
7. Sree Karinkali Devi Temple, Annassery
8. cherukattu kannikkan
9. Shri Palora Shiva Temple
10. Mathilakam shri Narasimha Moorthi Temple
11. Modappilavil shri bhagavathi temple
12. Sree Manathanathi nagakaali temple
13. Cherukatt gurudeva temple
14. velliyarkulangara Sree Maha Ganapati Temple

== Mosque ==
1. Purakkattiry jumua masjid
2. Salafi masjid Purakkattiry
3. Noor Masjid Kachery
4. Thaniyadath jumua masjid near bypass
5. Parambath old jumua masjid
6. Masjidul hamad Parambath
7. Masjidul Fathima andikode
8. Masjidul irshad padannakkalam
9. Masjid aboobacker sidheeq annasseey road
10. Masjidul Thaqwa vk road
11. Annasseey jumua masjid
12. Thoonumannil masjid
13. Edakkara jumua masjid near up school

Shri Palora Shiva temple is a popular religious destination of Thalakkulathur. It is about two km west of Purakkittiri town. The road to the river takes you to the temple after crossing the newly built highway. There is a small underpass for crossing the highway. The temple is built inside a calm residential zone and has sylvan surroundings. It is east facing and is a little elevated from the road.

== Image gallery ==
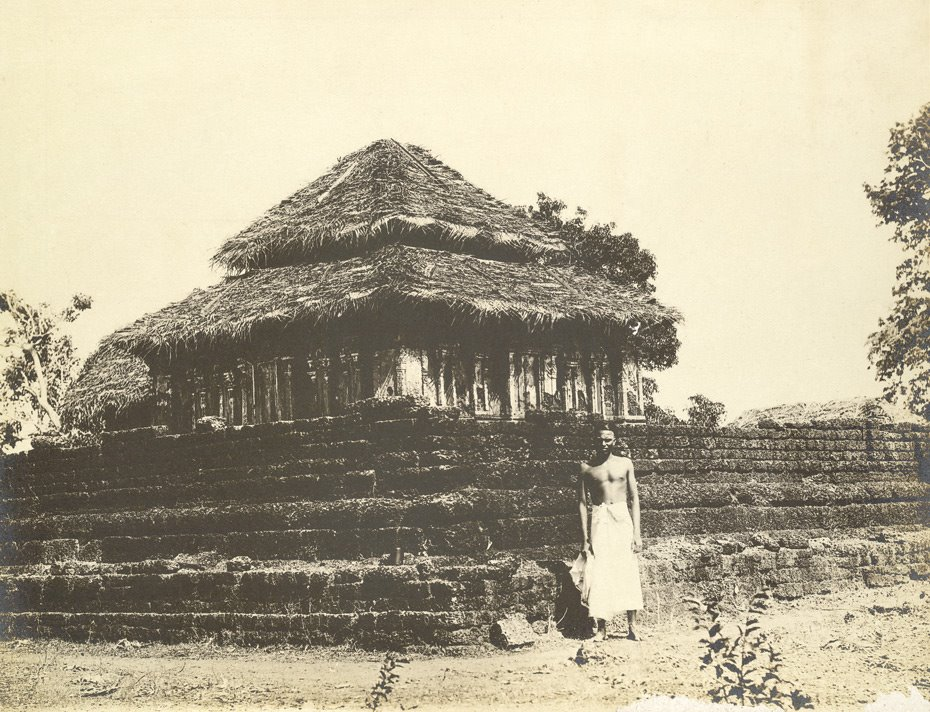
Thalakulathur Temple in 1900

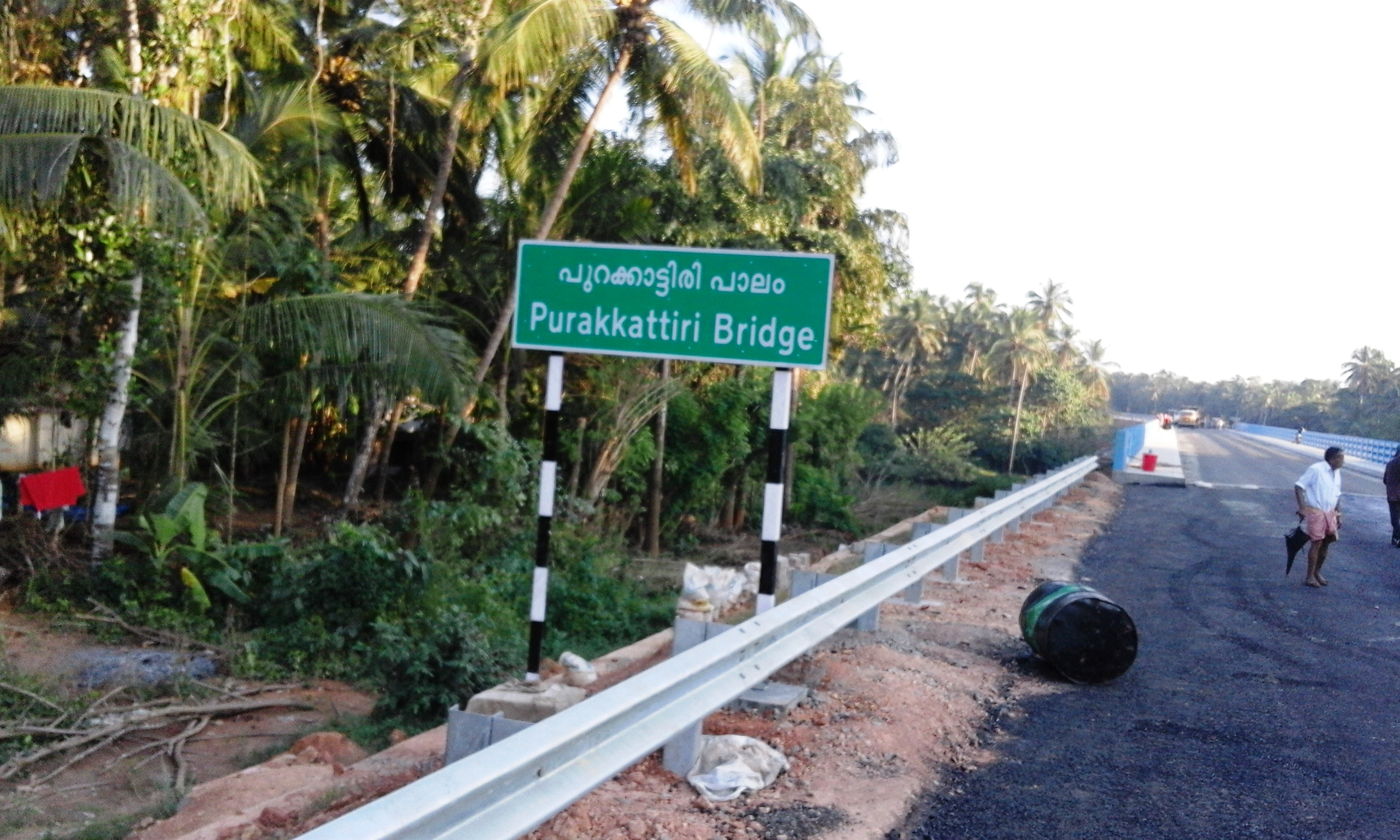
Purakkattiri Bridge on the Airport Road

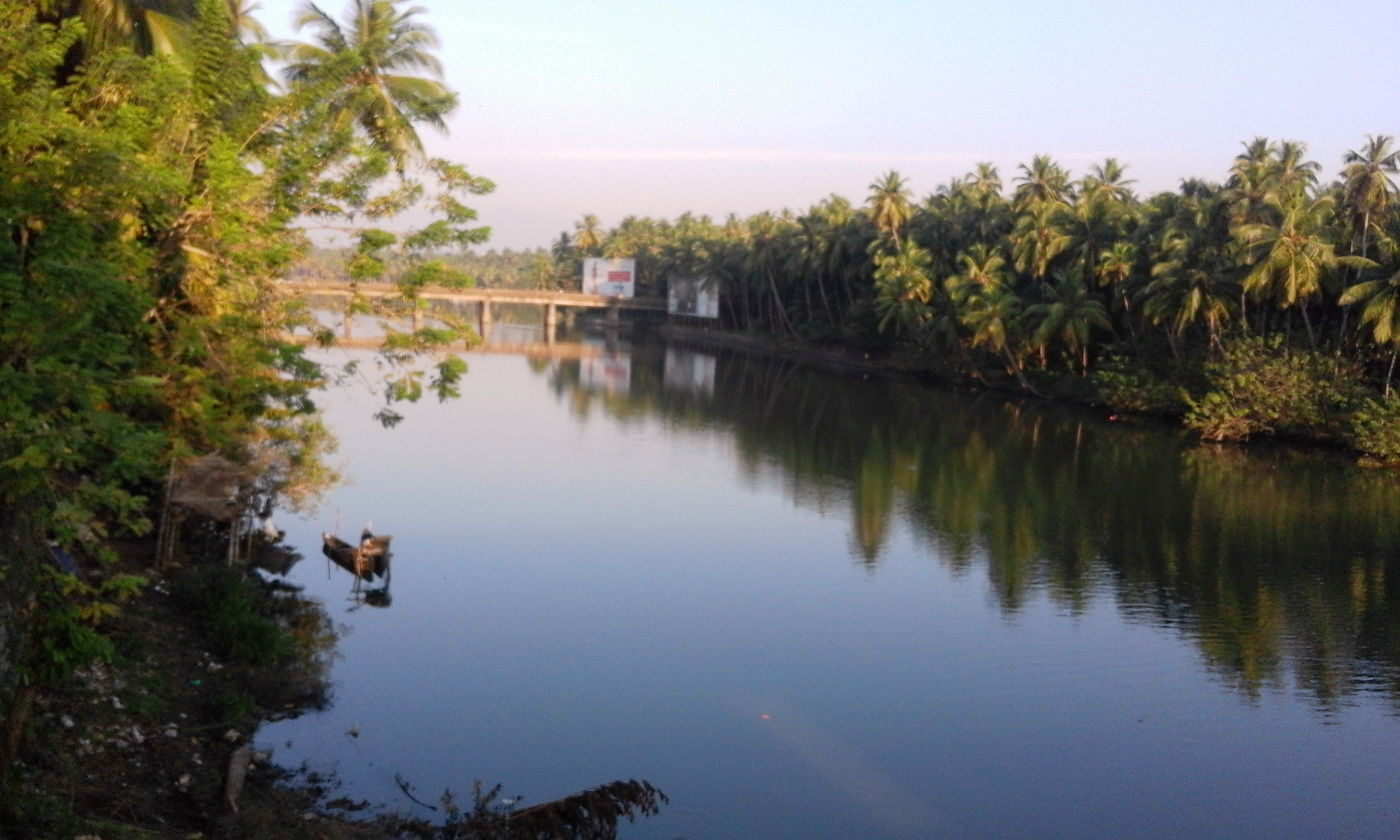
Purakkattiri River

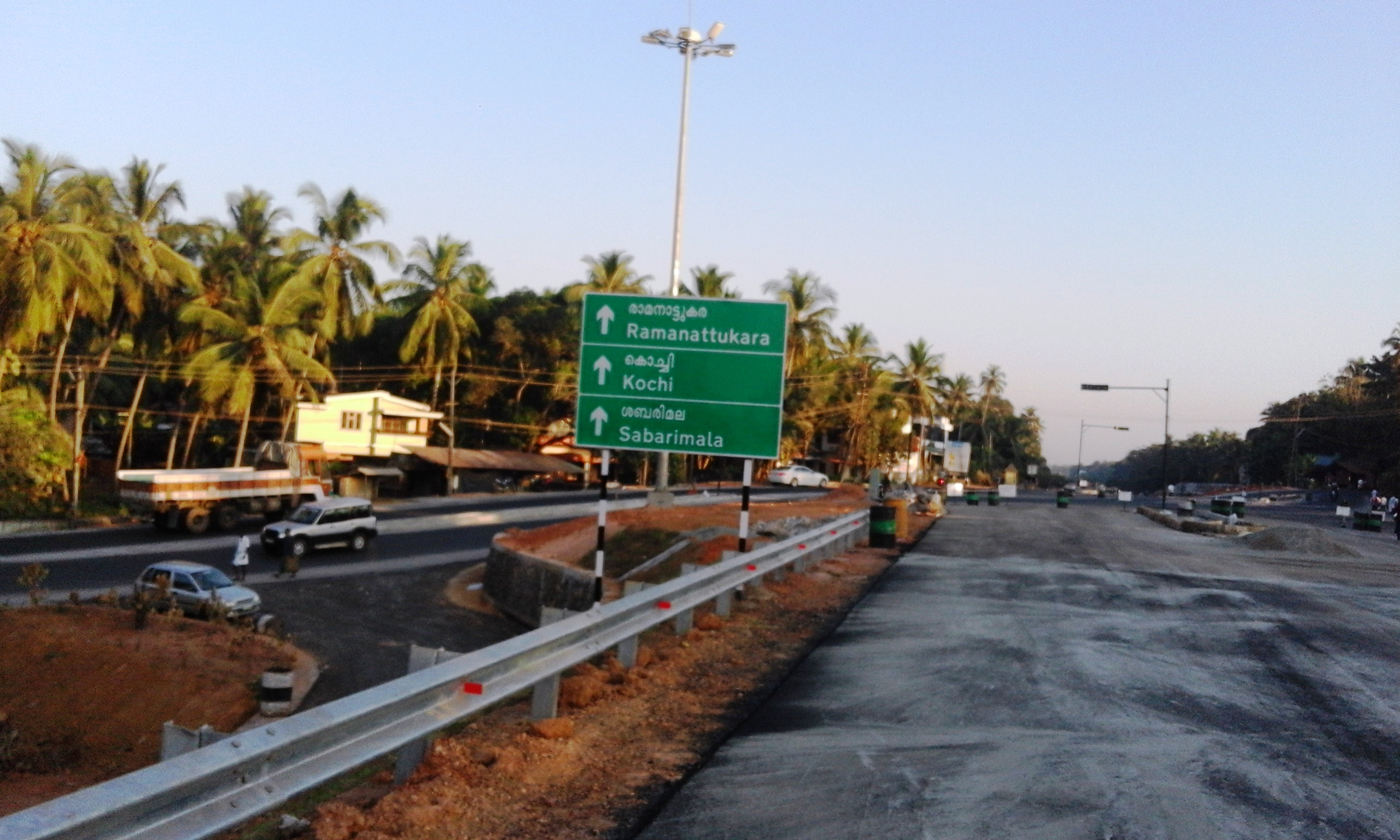
Purakkattiri Highway junction
