= Chekkiad =

- village
- Location in Kerala, India Chekkiad (India)
- Coordinates: 11.7464300°N 75.640850°E
- Country: India
- State: Kerala
- District: Kozhikode

Population (2011)
  - Total: 24,246

Languages
  - Official: Malayalam, English
- Time zone: UTC+5:30 (IST)
- Postal code: 673509
- Vehicle registration: KL-18

Chekkiad is a village in Kozhikode district in the state of Kerala, India.

== Demographics ==
As of 2011 India census, Chekkiad had a population of 24246 with 11194 males and 13052 females.

== Transportation ==
Chekkiad village connects to other parts of India through Vatakara city on the west and Kuttiady town on the east. National highway No.66 passes through Vatakara and the northern stretch connects to Mangalore, Goa and Mumbai. The southern stretch connects to Cochin and Trivandrum. The eastern Highway going through Kuttiady connects to Mananthavady, Mysore and Bangalore. The nearest airports are at Kannur and Kozhikode. The nearest railway station is at Vatakara.
