= Kunnummal =

- village
- Location in Kerala, India Kunnummal (India)
- Coordinates: 11°12′30″N 75°49′0″E
- Country: India
- State: Kerala
- District: Kozhikode

Population (2011)
  - Total: 18,031
- Time zone: UTC+5:30 (IST)
- Vehicle registration: KL-

Kunnummal is a panchayat located in Kozhikode district, in the state of Kerala, India.

== Demographics ==
As of 2011 India census, Kunnummal had a population of 18,031, with 8,479 males and 9,552 females.
