= Parambil Bazar =

Kuruvattur
- village
- Location in Kerala, India
- Coordinates: 11°18′22″N 75°49′25″E
- Country: India
- State: Kerala
- District: Kozhikode
- Established: 1961
- Nearest city: Kozhikode (Calicut)

Government
  - Type: local self-government
  - Lok Sabha constituency: Calicut
  - Vidhan Sabha constituency: Elathur

Area
  - Total: 17.94 km^{2} (6.93 sq mi)
- Elevation: 5 m (16 ft)

Population (2011)
  - Total: 16,451
  - Density: 1,577/km^{2} (4,080/sq mi)

Languages
  - Official: Malayalam, English
- Time zone: UTC+5:30 (Indian Standard Time (IST))
- Postal Index Number: 673611
- Vehicle registration: KL-11
- Coastline: 14 kilometres (8.7 mi)
- Climate: Tropical monsoon (Köppen)
- Avg. summer temperature: 35 °C (95 °F)
- Avg. winter temperature: 20 °C (68 °F)
- Sex ratio: 1068 ♂/♀

Kuruvattur is a village in Kozhikode district in the state of Kerala, India. It is 14 km (8.7 mi) from Kozhikode (Calicut) city.

The village shares its borders with Chelannur, Kakkodi, Madavoor, Kunnamangalam, and Kozhikode corporation. The village comes under Kunnamangalam block and has 18 wards. Parambil bazar and Payambra are the prominent places in Kuruvattoor. The junction Pottamuri in Kuruvattur serves connecting roads to Parambil Bazar, Palath, Kakkodi, and Kozhikode city.

The village is encouraging arts and sports, especially football. Many clubs and local bodies create events for boosting cultural aspects. Chandrodayam Vayanasala is the library for Kuruvattur. Parambil bazar is a main business area in kuruvatoor grama panchayath. This area is rich with nature.

== Education ==
The first educational institution was established as Payambra Elementary School in the year 1885. Now the school is upgraded to higher secondary school which serves the payambra, kuruvattoor and nearby regions. The panchayath has a literacy rate of 96.91% which is much higher than national average.

== Climate ==
Kuruvattoor features a tropical monsoon climate. It has a highly humid tropical climate with high temperatures recorded from March to May. A brief spell of pre-monsoon Mango showers hits the city sometime during April. However, the primary source of rain is the South-west monsoon that sets in the first week of June and continues until September. The village receives significant precipitation from the North-East Monsoon that sets in from the second half of October through November.

== Demographics ==
Religion in Kuruvattur
Religion	Percent
Hinduism	63.75%
Islam	34.92%
Christianity	1.02%

As of 2011 India census, Kuruvattur had a population of 34,241 with 16,451 males and 17,790 females.

== Landmarks ==
- Polur Subramanya Swamy Temple

== Notable residents ==
A. Santha Kumar -(1969-2021) playwrighter and screenplay writer
