= Eramala =

- village
- Location in Kerala, India Eramala (India)
- Coordinates: 11.6788618°N 75.593091°E
- Country: India
- State: Kerala
- District: Kozhikode

Government
  - Type: Panchayati raj (India)
  - Body: Gram panchayat

Population (2011)
  - Total: 26,293

Languages
  - Official: Malayalam, English
- Time zone: UTC+5:30 (IST)
- Telephone code: 254
- ISO 3166 code: IN-KL
- Vehicle registration: KL-
- Nearest city: Vatakara
- Lok Sabha constituency: Vatakara
- Vidhan Sabha constituency: Vatakara
- Climate: Normal (Köppen)

Eramala is a village in Kozhikode district, Kerala, India. The village is the site of a popular annual celebration called Orkkatteri Chantha.

== Demographics ==
As of 2011, the total population of Eramala is 26,293 (12,372 being male and 13,921 being female). As of the 2001 India census, Eramala had a population of 32,151 with 15,069 males and 17,082 females.

== Transportation ==
Eramala village connects to other parts of India through Vatakara city on the west and Kuttiady town on the east. National Highway No. 66 passes through Vatakara, and the northern stretch connects Mangalore, Goa, and Mumbai. The southern stretch connects to Cochin and Trivandrum. The eastern highway connects to Mananthavady, Mysore, and Bangalore via Kuttiady. The nearby airports are at Kannur and Kozhikode. The nearest railway station is at Vatakara.
