= Kottappally =

- village
- Location in Kerala, India Kottappally (India)
- Coordinates: 11°36′0″N 75°40′0″E
- Country: India
- State: Kerala
- District: Kozhikode

Population (2011)
  - Total: 21,169

Languages
  - Official: Malayalam, English
- Time zone: UTC+5:30 (IST)
- Vehicle registration: KL-18

Kottappally is a village in Kozhikode district in the state of Kerala, India. The village is located 8 kilometres east of Vatakara and 14 kilometres west of Kuttiady. Villiappally (5 km) and Thiruvallur (4 km) and Valliyad (1 km) are the other nearby villages.

The Mahe-Vatakara Canal is passing through this way and it was said that the work will finish almost about 2015. The place is in Thiruvallur Panchayath.

== Demographics ==
As of 2011 India census, Kottappally had a population of 21169 with 9961 males and 11208 females.

== Transportation ==
Kottappally is well connected with all the places in the district as well as the state. Kavil-Theekkuni road is passing through this village. NH-17 is just 10 Kilometres far from Kottappally. Vatakara railway station is the nearest railway station that is in just 10 Kilometres distance. Nearest Airport is Calicut International Airport, approx. 80 km away, the nearest Airport for Kottappally is Kannur International Airport.52 km only

== Educational institutions ==
- Kottappally MLP School
- Kottappally LP School
- Kannambathkara LP School
- Valliyad UP School
