= Ayancheri =

- village
- Location in Kerala, India Ayancheri (India)
- Coordinates: 11.656770°N 75.656460°E
- Country: India
- State: Kerala
- District: Kozhikode

Government
  - Body: Panchayath

Population (2011)
  - Total: 26,293

Languages
  - Official: Malayalam, English
- Time zone: UTC+5:30 (IST)
- Postal code: 673541
- Vehicle registration: KL-18
- Website: http://ayanchery.com

Ayancheri is a village in the Vadakara Taluk of Kozhikode district in the state of Kerala, India. It has now become a small business hub among the nearest villages. The main business centre is located on Katameri Road. Ayancheri is the main transit town from Vatakara to Kuttiady and other surrounding villages. The rapid development of Ayancheri is primarily due to its status as the main transit town. It is one of the main villages in Vatakara Taluk.

== Transportation ==
Ayancheri village connects to other parts of India through Vatakara city on the west and Kuttiady town on the east. National highway No. 17 passes through Vatakara and the northern stretch connects to Mangalore, Goa and Mumbai. The southern stretch connects to Cochin and Trivandrum. The eastern Highway going through Kuttiady connects to Mananthavady, Mysore and Bangalore. The nearest airports are at Kannur and Kozhikode. The nearest railway station is at Vatakara. Ayancheri has a same distance to the nearby towns Kuttiady, Nadapuram, Vatakara and Kakkattil

== Demographics ==
As of 2011 India census, Ayancheri had a population of 26293 with 12,372 males and 13,921 females. http://commons.wikimedia.org/wiki/File:Thazhe_Komath_Sri_Durga_Bhagavathy_Temple_Ayancheri_And_Komath_Tharavadu.pdf
