= Olavanna =

Olavanna Grama panchayath
- Village
- Interactive map of Olavanna
- Coordinates: 11.27°N 75.87°E
- Country: India
- State: Kerala
- District: Kozhikode

Area
  - Total: 21.43 km^{2} (8.27 sq mi)

Population (2011)
  - Total: 68,432
  - Density: 3,193/km^{2} (8,271/sq mi)

Languages
  - Official: Malayalam, English
- Time zone: UTC+5:30 (IST)
- PIN: 673019
- Vehicle registration: KL-85

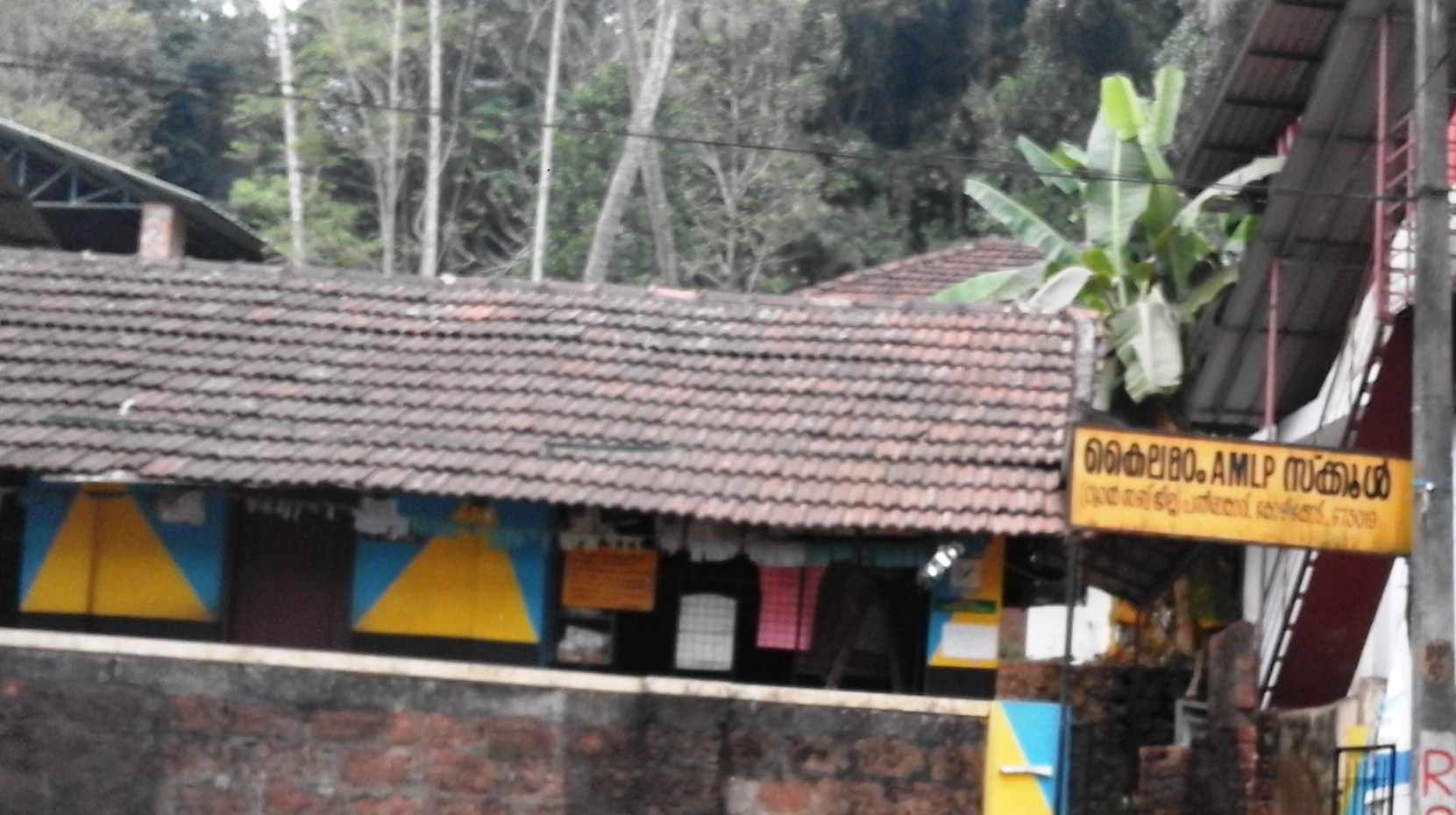
Kailamadom School, Pantheeramkavu

Olavanna is a panchayat in Kozhikode district in the Indian state of Kerala. Olavanna is the most populous panchayat in Kerala. It is located 10 km from Kozhikode City. Olavanna panchayat shares the border with Kozhikode corporation and Perumanna panchayat. Pantheerankavu is the largest city in the panchayat. The nearest railway station is about 10 kilometres away and the nearest airport is Kozhikode International Airport. HiLite Mall is located in Palazhi Junction.

Olavanna is a part of the Kozhikode urban area master plan.

== Demographics ==
olavanna panchayath population
| Year | Pop. | ±% |
|---|---|---|
| 1981 | 34,004 | — |
| 1991 | 44,398 | +30.6% |
| 2001 | 55,417 | +24.8% |
| 2011 | 68,432 | +23.5% |
Source: Census of India

As of 2001 India census, Olavanna had a population of 30,927. Males constitute 49% of the population and females 51%. Olavanna has an average literacy rate of 83%, higher than the national average of 59.5%: male literacy is 85%, and female literacy is 80%. In Olavanna, 12% of the population is under 6 years of age.
