= Thazhecode, Kozhikode district =

Thazhecode
- village
- Interactive map of Thazhecode
- Country: India
- State: Kerala
- District: Kozhikode

Population (2011)
  - Total: 25,116

Languages
  - Official: Malayalam, English
- Time zone: UTC+5:30 (IST)
- PIN: 673602
- Vehicle registration: KL-57-

Thazhecode is a village in Kozhikode district in the state of Kerala, India.

== Demographics ==
As of 2011 India census, Thazhecode had a population of 25116 with 12080 males and 13036 females.
