= Panangad, Kozhikode =

Panangad
- Gram Panchayat
- Location in Balussery, Kozhikode, Kerala, India Panangad (India)
- Coordinates: 11°25′0″N 75°55′0″E
- Country: India
- State: Kerala
- District: Kozhikode

Area
  - Total: 47 km^{2} (18 sq mi)

Population (2001)
  - Total: 33,628
  - Density: 1,051/km^{2} (2,720/sq mi)

Languages
  - Official: Malayalam, English
- Time zone: UTC+5:30 (IST)
- PIN: 673612
- Vehicle registration: KL-76
- Nearest city: Kozhikode
- Sex ratio: 986 ♂/♀
- Literacy: 92.04%
- Lok Sabha constituency: Kozhikode
- Vidhan Sabha constituency: Balussery
- Website: www.panangadgp.org

Panangad is a village in the Kozhikode district of Kerala, India. It is located in the outskirts of Balussery town. It is one among the 75 grama panchayats and coming under Balussery block.

== Administration ==
Panagad's developmental activities are well known in the region. It won the best panchayat trophy in 2001 and also secured the best panchayat within the district. In addition, it also received Nirmal puraskar (Cleanliness award) for its cleanliness nature. Mrs. V. M. Kamalakshi is the prevailing president of the panchayat. Panchayat constitutes of 20 wards currently.

== Transportation ==
Panangad village connects to other parts of India through Kozhikode and Koyilandy. The nearest airport is Kozhikode. The nearest railway station is at Koyilandy.

== Sports ==
The Usha sports school is located at Kinalur estate in Panangad Grama Panchayath. The school is located here at Kinalur estate around 5 km from Balussery.

== Vayalada Hill Station ==
The government has, under the Balussery Tourism Corridor Project, sanctioned ₹3.4 crore for setting up basic tourism amenities at Mullanpara viewpoint and surrounding areas in Vayalada.

The destination, located nearly 40 km away from the city overlooking the Peruvannamoozhi reservoir, will get a few rain shelters, better parking facility, cafeteria and comfort stations. Hand-railings too will be fixed around the viewpoint, taking into consideration the safety of visitors. This is a popularise the destination Balussery - Kannadipoyil - kurumboyil Route.
