= Kizhakkoth =

- village
- Location in Kerala, India Kizhakkoth (India)
- Coordinates: 11°21′30″N 75°53′55″E
- Country: India
- State: Kerala
- District: Kozhikode

Population (2011)
  - Total: 31,261

Languages
  - Official: Malayalam, English
- Time zone: UTC+5:30 (IST)
- Vehicle registration: KL-
- Nearest city: Koduvally
- Lok Sabha constituency: Kozhikode
- Vidhan Sabha constituency: Koduvally

Kizhakkoth is a village in Kozhikode district in the state of Kerala, India.

== Demographics ==
As of 2011 India census, Kizhakkoth had a population of 31261 with 14855 males and 16406 females.

== Transportation ==
Kozhakkoth village connects to other parts of India through Kozhikode city on the west and Thamarassery town on the east. National Highway 66 passes through Kozhikode and its northern stretch connects to Mangalore, Goa and Mumbai. The southern stretch connects to Cochin and Trivandrum. The eastern National Highway 54 in copAdivaram connects to Kalpetta, Mysore and Bangalore. The nearest airports are at Kannur and Kozhikode. The nearest railway station is at Kozhikode.
