= Vavad, India =

Vavad
- village
- Location in Kerala, India Vavad (India)
- Coordinates: 11°23′0″N 75°55′0″E
- Country: India
- State: Kerala
- District: Kozhikode
- Established: 1956
- Founder: parashuraman
- Named for: coconut

Government
  - Type: Panchayati raj (India)
  - Body: Gram panchayat

Population (2011)
  - Total: 14,818

Languages
  - Official: Malayalam, English
- Time zone: UTC+5:30 (IST)
- PIN: 673572
- Vehicle registration: KL-57

Vavad is a village in Kozhikode district in the state of Kerala, India.

== Demographics ==
At the 2011 Census of India, Vavad had a population of 14,818 with 6,938 males and 6787 females.
