= Meppayur Assembly constituency =

Constituency of the Kerala Legislative Assembly

Coordinates: 11.53°N 75.71°E

Meppayur
- Former constituency for the Kerala Legislative Assembly
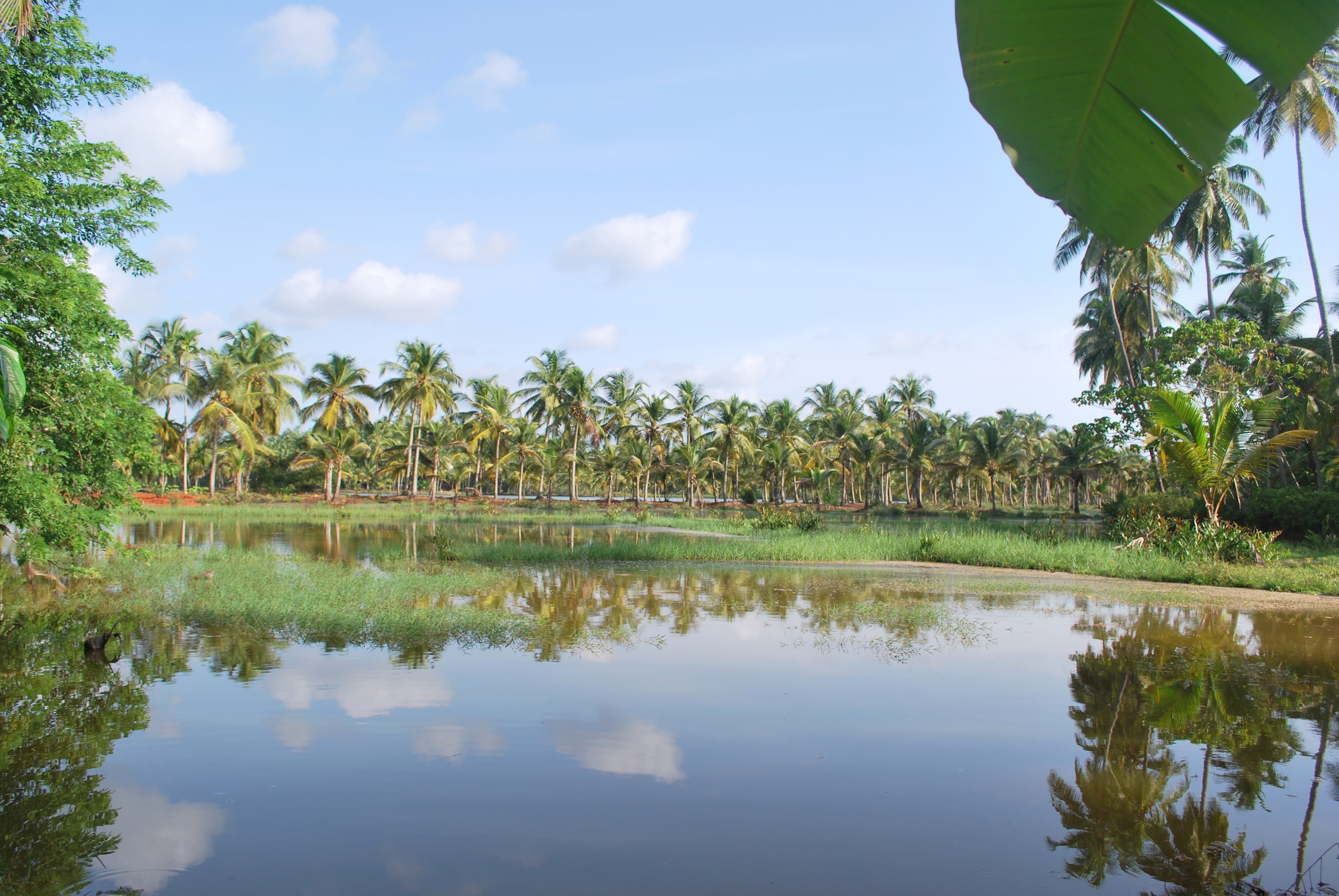
- Paddy fields during winter season at Maniyur

Constituency details
- Country: India
- Region: South India
- State: Kerala
- District: Kozhikode
- Established: 1965
- Abolished: 2008
- Total electors: 1,61,852 (2006)
- Reservation: None

Meppayur State assembly constituency was one of the 140 state legislative assembly constituencies in Kerala in southern India, before the 2008 delimitation of constituencies. It was one of the seven state legislative assembly constituencies included in Vatakara Lok Sabha constituency until the 2008 delimitation. The last election to the constituency was conducted in 2006, and the MLA was K. K. Lathika of CPI(M).

After the delimitation in 2008, Kunnummal, Kuttiady, Purameri, Ayancheri, Thiruvallur, Maniyur, and Velom Gram Panchayats became a part of the newly formed Kuttiady Assembly constituency, whereas Cheruvannur and Meppayur were added to the Perambra Assembly constituency.

== Local self-governed segments ==
Meppayur Assembly constituency was composed of the following local self-governed segments:

Sl no.	Name	Status (Grama panchayat/Municipality)	Taluk	Now part of
1	Kunnummal	Grama panchayat	Vatakara	Kuttiady constituency
2	Kuttiady	Grama panchayat	Vatakara	Kuttiady constituency
3	Purameri	Grama Panchayat	Vatakara	Kuttiady constituency
4	Ayancheri	Grama panchayat	Vatakara	Kuttiady constituency
5	Thiruvallur	Grama panchayat	Vatakara	Kuttiady constituency
6	Maniyur	Grama panchayat	Vatakara	Kuttiady constituency
7	Velom	Grama panchayat	Vatakara	Kuttiady constituency
8	Cheruvannur	Grama panchayat	Koyilandy	Perambra constituency
9	Meppayur	Grama panchayat	Koyilandy	Perambra constituency

== Election history ==
Election	Votes polled	Winner				Runner-up 1				Runner-up 2				Margin of victory	
Year		Name	Party	Votes		Name	Party	Votes		Name	Party	Votes		Votes	Percent
Constituency defunct as a result of delimitation (2011)
2006	133702 (82.6%)	K. K. Lathika	CPI(M)	70369	52.63%	T. T. Ismail	IUML	54482	40.75%	T. T. Prabhakaran Master	BJP	5370	4.02%	15887	11.89%
2001	130884 (82.8%)	Mathai Chacko	CPI(M)	63709	48.97%	P. Ammed Master	IUML	58953	45.31%	M. M. Radhakrishnan Master	BJP	5156	3.96%	4756	3.66%
1996	123247 (78.6%)	A. Kanaran	CPI(M)	65932	53.94%	P. V. Muhammad Areekode	IUML	49388	40.40%	M. Mohanan	BJP	5832	4.77%	16544	13.54%
1991	117174 (80.2%)	A. Kanaran	CPI(M)	58362	50.61%	Kadameri Balakrishnan	INC	49038	42.53%	K. P. Achuthan	BJP	4176	3.62%	9324	8.08%
1987	97788 (85.0%)	A. Kanaran	CPI(M)	48337	49.68%	A. V. Abdurahman Haji	IUML	44663	45.90%	P. K. Sreedharan	BJP	3595	3.69%	3674	3.78%
1982	80576 (78.8%)	A. V. Abdurahman Haji	AIML	42022	52.62%	A. C. Abdulla	IUML	34835	43.62%	Chulliyil Narayanan	BJP	2386	2.99%	7187	9.00%
1980	81651 (81.0%)	A. V. Abdurahman Haji	AIML	43851	54.01%	P. K. K. Bava	IUML	36044	44.39%	I. T. Narayanan	SUCI	1301	1.60%	7807	9.62%
1977	77430 (85.8%)	Panarath Kunhimuhammad	IUML	40642	53.87%	A. V. Abdurahman Haji	ML(O)	34808	46.13%	Only two candidates contested				5834	7.74%
Major delimitation of constituency
1970	63675 (85.4%)	A. V. Abdurahman	IUML	30759	48.99%	M. K. Kelu	CPI(M)	28408	45.25%	C. H. Kunhikrishnakurup	INC(O)	3618	5.76%	2351	3.74%
1967	50992 (79.6%)	M. K. Kelu	CPI(M)	33365	68.09%	C. K. Kurup	INC	15639	31.91%	Only two candidates contested				17726	36.18%
1965	54445 (84.4%)	M. K. Kelu	CPI(M)	23998	45.04%	K. Gopalan	INC	15555	29.19%	M. Hakkimji Saheb	IUML	13727	25.76%	8443	15.85%

== Election results ==
Percentage change (±%) denotes the change in the number of votes from the immediately previous election.

=== 2006 ===
There were 1,61,852 registered voters in Meppayur Constituency for the 2006 Kerala Niyamasabha Election.

2006 Kerala Legislative Assembly election: Meppayur
Party	Candidate	Votes	%	±%
CPI(M)	K. K. Lathika	70,369	52.63%	▲3.66
IUML	T. T. Ismail	54,482	40.75%	▼4.56
BJP	T. T. Prabhakaran Master	5,370	4.02%	▲0.06
Independent	M. K. Rajan	1,289	0.96%	N/A
Independent	Ismail. P. T	726	0.54%	N/A
BSP	T. V. Geetha	572	0.43%	▲0.43
Independent	Kalanthan Haji	303	0.23%	N/A
Independent	E. C. Janaki	289	0.22%	N/A
Independent	Rajan Ummar Kandy	242	0.18%	N/A
Margin of victory		15,887	11.89%	▲8.23
Turnout		1,33,642	82.61%	▼0.18
CPI(M) hold		Swing	▲8.23	

=== 2001 ===
There were 1,58,091 registered voters in Meppayur Constituency for the 2001 Kerala Niyamasabha Election.

2001 Kerala Legislative Assembly election: Meppayur
Party	Candidate	Votes	%	±%
CPI(M)	Mathai Chacko	63,709	48.97%	▼4.97
IUML	P. Ammed Master	58,953	45.31%	▲4.91
BJP	P. Satyaprakashan Master	5,156	3.96%	▼0.86
Independent	P. K. Sreedharan Master	1,381	1.06%	N/A
Independent	P. Ammed	898	0.69%	N/A
Margin of victory		4,756	3.66%	▼9.88
Turnout		1,30,884	82.79%	▲4.17
CPI(M) hold		Swing	▼9.88	

== See also ==
- Meppayur
- Kuttiady (State Assembly constituency)
- Kozhikode district
- List of constituencies of the Kerala Legislative Assembly
- 2006 Kerala Legislative Assembly election
