= Kuttiady Assembly constituency =

Constituency of the Kerala legislative assembly in India

Kuttiady
- Constituency No. 21 for the Kerala Legislative Assembly
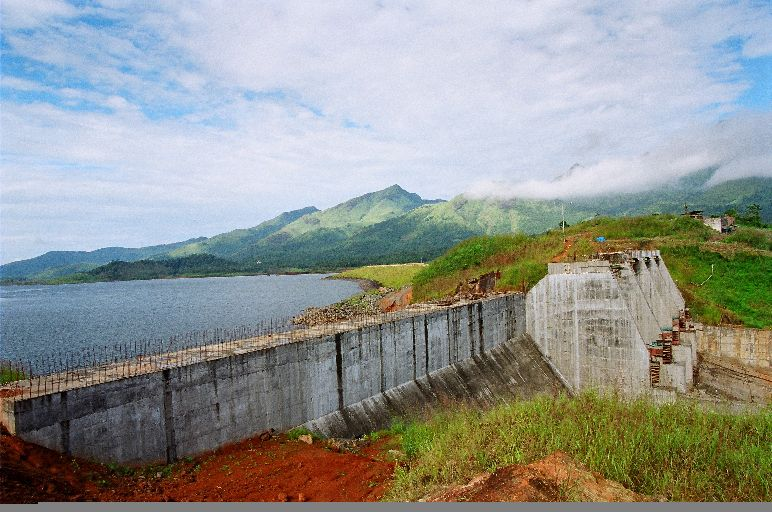
- Kuttiyadi Dam

Constituency details
- Country: India
- Region: South India
- State: Kerala
- District: Kozhikode
- Established: 2008
- Total electors: 2,02,211 (2021)
- Reservation: None

Member of Legislative Assembly
- 16th Kerala Legislative Assembly
- Incumbent Parakkal Abdulla
- Party: IUML
- Elected year: 2026

Kuttiady State assembly constituency is one of the 140 state legislative assembly constituencies in Kerala in southern India. It is also one of the seven state legislative assembly constituencies included in Vatakara Lok Sabha constituency. As of the 2026 Assembly elections, the current MLA is Parakkal Abdulla of IUML.

== Local self-governed segments ==
Seven out of the eight local bodies included in the current Kuttiady Assembly constituency were part of the erstwhile Meppayur Assembly constituency before the 2008 delimitation. Kuttiady Assembly constituency is composed of the following local self-governed segments:

Sl no.	Name	Status (Grama panchayat/Municipality)	Taluk
1	Ayancheri	Grama panchayat	Vatakara
2	Kunnummal	Grama panchayat	Vatakara
3	Kuttiady	Grama panchayat	Vatakara
4	Purameri	Grama Panchayat	Vatakara
5	Maniyur	Grama panchayat	Vatakara
6	Thiruvallur	Grama panchayat	Vatakara
7	Velom	Grama panchayat	Vatakara
8	Villiappally	Grama panchayat	Vatakara

== Members of Legislative Assembly ==
The following list contains all members of Kerala Legislative Assembly who have represented the constituency:

Election	Niyama Sabha	Name	Party	Tenure
2011	13th	K. K. Lathika	Communist Party of India	2011 – 2016
2016	14th	Parakkal Abdulla	Indian Union Muslim League	2016 – 2021
2021	15th	K. P. Kunhammadkutty	Communist Party of India	2021-2026
2026	16th	Parakkal Abdulla	Indian Union Muslim League	2026 –

== Election history ==
=== 2026 ===
2026 Kerala Legislative Assembly election: Kuttiady
Party	Candidate	Votes	%	±%
IUML	Parakkal Abdulla	88,197	49.52	▲2.51
CPI(M)	K. P. Kunhammadkutty	77,275	43.39	▼3.81
BJP	Ramdas Manaleri	12,035	6.76	▲1.38
NOTA	None of the above	390	0.22	▲0.05
Independent	Kunhammadkutty	114	0.06	
Independent	Abdulla	95	0.05	
Margin of victory		10,922	6.13	▲5.94
Turnout		1,78,106		
IUML gain from CPI(M)		Swing	▲2.51	

=== 2021 ===
There were 2,02,211 registered voters in the constituency for the 2021 election.

2021 Kerala Legislative Assembly election: Kuttiady
Party	Candidate	Votes	%	±%
CPI(M)	K. P. Kunhammadkutty	80,143	47.2	▲3.7
IUML	Parakkal Abdulla	79,810	47.01	▲2.24
BJP	P. P. Murali	9,139	5.38	▼2.43
NOTA	None of the above	296	0.17	▼.7
Independent	Suresh Babu M.K	128	0.08	−
Independent	V. P. Pratheesh	108	0.06	−
Independent	K. K Kunhammad Kutti	80	0.05	−
Independent	Abdulla S/o Pokker	75	0.04	−
Margin of victory		333	0.19	
Turnout		1,64,404	81.30	▼4.18
CPI(M) gain from IUML		Swing		

- In 2021, Kuttiadi Assembly constituency had a total of 2,02,211 electors. The total number of polled votes was 1,64,404. Communist Party Of India (Marxist) candidate K. P. Kunhammed Kutti won and became MLA from this seat. He secured a total of 80,143 votes. Indian Union Muslim League candidate Parakkal Abdulla stood second with a total of 79,810 votes, losing by 333 votes.

=== 2016 ===
There were 1,84,610 registered voters in the constituency for the 2016 election.

2016 Kerala Legislative Assembly election: Kuttiady
Party	Candidate	Votes	%	±%
IUML	Parakkal Abdulla	71,809	45.50	▲1.07
CPI(M)	K. K. Lathika	70,652	44.77	▼4.55
BJP	Ramadas Manaleri	12,327	7.81	▲3.41
WPOI	P. C. Balakrishnan	1,125	0.71	−
SP	Sabu Kakkattil	860	0.54	−
NOTA	None of the above	375	0.24	−
Independent	K. C. Kumaran	220	0.14	−
PDP	Naranathu Muhammad	118	0.07	−
Independent	Parakkal Abdulla Palliyath	85	0.05	−
Independent	S. R. Khan Maniyoor	76	0.05	−
Independent	Aluva Aneesh	57	0.04	−
Independent	Paremmal Abdulla	44	0.03	−
Margin of victory		1,157	0.73	
Turnout		1,57,810	85.48	▼2.24
IUML gain from CPI(M)		Swing		

- In 2016, Kuttiadi Assembly constituency had a total of 1,84,610 electors. The total number of valid votes was 1,57,810. Indian Union Muslim League candidate Parakkal Abdulla won and became MLA from this seat. He secured a total of 71,809 votes. Communist Party Of India (Marxist) candidate K. K. Lathika stood second with total 70,652 votes, losing by 1,157 votes.

=== 2011 ===
There were 1,62,389 registered voters in the constituency for the 2011 election.

2011 Kerala Legislative Assembly election: Kuttiady
Party	Candidate	Votes	%	±%
CPI(M)	K. K. Lathika	70,258	49.32	
IUML	Sooppy Narikkatteri	63,286	44.43	
BJP	V. K .Sajeevan	6,272	4.40	
SDPI	Abdul Raheem	1,045	0.73	
BSP	M. Sathi	407	0.29	
Independent	Sooppy Thoduvayil Valappil Meethal	333	0.23	
Independent	Lathika Valiyakulangara Kuniyil	247	0.17	
Independent	Sooppy Alakkat	209	0.15	
Independent	Lathika Nidumanalkuni	207	0.15	
SUCI(C)	M. K. Rajan	189	0.13	
Margin of victory		6,972	4.89	
Turnout		1,42,453	87.72	
CPI(M) win (new seat)				

- In 2011, Kuttiadi Assembly constituency had a total of 1,62,389 electors. The total number of valid votes was 1,42,453. Communist Party Of India (Marxist) candidate K. K. Lathika won and became MLA from this seat. She secured a total of 70,258 votes. Muslim League Kerala State Committee candidate Sooppy Narikkatteri stood second with a total of 63,286 votes, losing by 6,972 votes.

== See also ==
- Kuttiady
- Meppayur (State Assembly constituency)
- Kozhikode district
- List of constituencies of the Kerala Legislative Assembly
- 2016 Kerala Legislative Assembly election
