= Cheruvannur Gram Panchayat =

Grama panchayat in Kerala, India

Cheruvannur
- Village
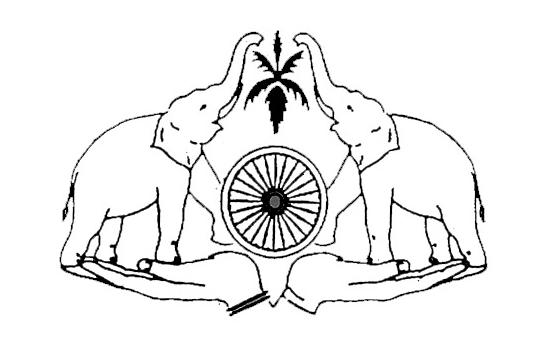
- Seal

- Location in Kerala, India Cheruvannur (India)
- Coordinates: 11.57°N 75.71°E
- Country: India
- State: Kerala
- Region: South India
- District: Kozhikode

Government
  - President: Shijith T.N

Area
  - Total: 21.61 km^{2} (8.34 sq mi)

Population (2001)
  - Total: 22,150
  - Density: 1,025/km^{2} (2,655/sq mi)

Languages
  - Official: Malayalam, English
- Time zone: UTC+5:30 (IST)
- PIN: 673524
- Telephone code: 91 496
- Website: lsgkerala.in/cheruvannurpanchayat/

Cheruvannur is one of the 78 grama panchayats of Kozhikode district, Kerala, India. It lies between North Latitude 11° 32′ 37.11" and 11° 36′ 4.67", East Longitude 75° 40′ 26.32" and 75° 43′ 55.22". It has a total area of 21.61 square kilometers. The adjoining grama panchayats are Thiruvallur and Velom in the north, Perambra in the east, Nochad, Meppayur and Thurayur in the south, Maniyur and Thiruvallur in the west.

== Geography ==
The Kuttiyadi river, also known as the Kotta river flows from north to south, through the eastern side of the grama panchayat, and detaches it from Vatakara taluk. The physical geography of the grama panchayat is not planar. The ridges of smaller and medium hills and low lying valleys make the area an undulating terrain. The grama panchayat can be divided into three regions, according to the physical geography – viz, hilly area, slopes and valleys. The highest area in grama panchayat is Purakkamala (പുറക്കാമല) noted with a height of 115 metres above sea level. Cheruvannur grama panchayat includes some of the lowest lying places of the region, and parts of these areas are often flooded during monsoon.

== Transportation ==
Cheruvannur connects to other parts of India through Koyilandy. The nearest airports are at Kannur and Kozhikode. The nearest railway station is at Vadakara and Koyiandy. The national highway no.66 passes through Koyilandy and the northern stretch connects to Goa and Mumbai. The southern stretch connects to Cochin and Trivandrum. The eastern National Highway No.54 going through Kuttiady connects to Mananthavady, Mysore and Bangalore.

== History ==
Formed in the year 1934, Cheruvannur is one of the oldest grama panchayats in Kerala. The area has a long history of human settlements. A megalithic burial monument, belongs to roughly a period of 300 B.C. to 500 A.D (Ganesh, K.M., 1990.), is seen in Edakkayil as a proof. A cave (Innes. C.A, Evans. F.B.(Ed.), 1958) is also present in Moyiloth near Muyippoth belongs to the same period, now lies under thick soil cover which was carelessly deposited on it during the construction of irrigation canal passing there by, remains almost forgotten.

Before British rule, the place was included in Payyormala a feudal principality controlled by three nair families namely Paleri, Avinhatt, and Koothali and those acknowledged the suzerainty of Zamorin of Calicut(Innes. C.A, Evans. F.B.(Ed.), 1958). Payyormala is a slightly elevated area near Edakkayil, from where the name of the principality evolved, now remains a place of less importance. Remnants of a small shrine of payyormala muthassi the guardian angel of the principality, still seen here. Under British administration the area included in Kurumbranad taluk, Malabar district of Madras presidency (Innes. C.A, Evans. F.B.(Ed.), 1958). At present it find its place in Perambra development block and in Koyilandy taluk, Kozhikode district of Kerala state. The people from the region has a rich tradition of participation in various important historical events, among them Pazhassi revolts against the rule of British East India Company took place between 1796 and 1805 and Koothali strike took place in the period of 1940 -1950 are most notable. Many people from this locality joined the mainstream freedom struggle, two of them joined Indian National Army and fought against the British colonialism.

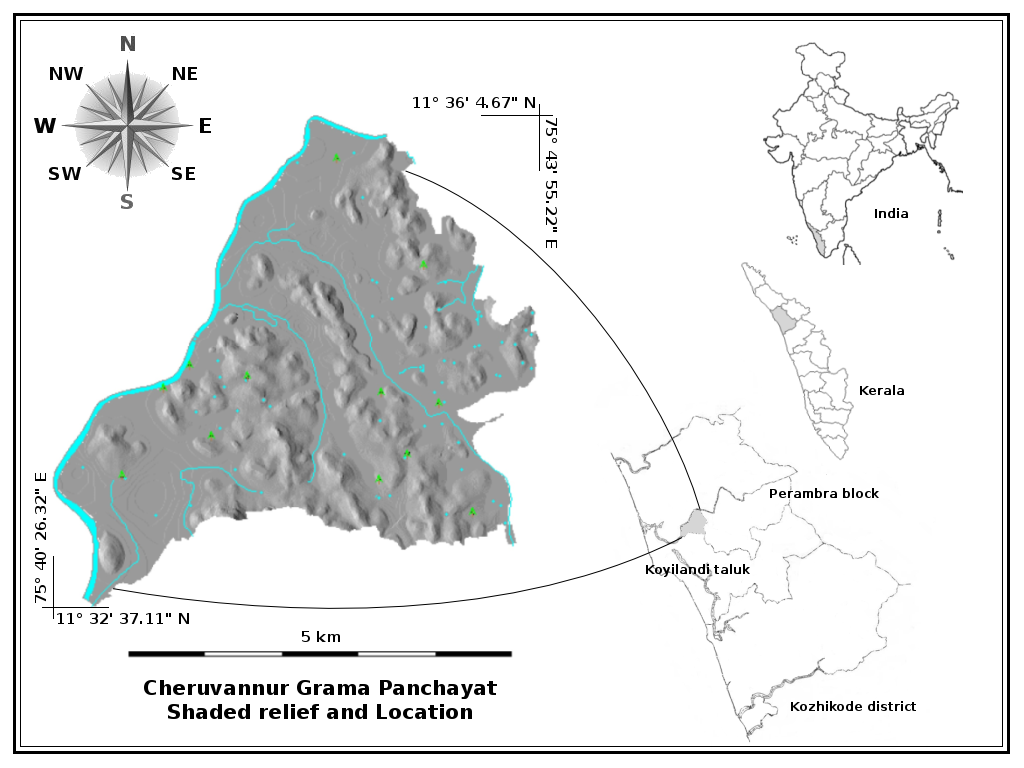
Cheruvannur Grama Panchayat location and shaded relief.

== Government, health and education ==
Grama panchayat is divided into 15 ward constituencies for developmental and administrative purposes. The representative members are elected from each ward for a quinquennium to the grama panchayat administrative committee. In the period of 1990-1995 the number of wards were 9, in 1995-2000 it was 10, in 2000-2005 period it increased as 12, for the period of 2005-2010 the number of ward constituencies was 14, and now for the period of 2010-2014 the number of ward constituencies are 15. The increase in number of wards is based on the criteria set up by the State Election Commission, which finds the basics of increase in population, increase in the number of households etc.

The people of Cheruvannur Grama Panchayat have accessibility to the three systems of medicine by the presence of 1 Govt. Primary health centre, three Family Welfare centres, 1 Govt. Ayurveda Hospital and a Govt. Homeopathy dispensary. A total number of 20 Anganwadi centres serve the child welfare part very well.

Cheruvannur has 10 lower primary schools, three upper primary schools, 2 high schools, 1 higher secondary school, 1 un-aided school are present, and among them 1 U. P. School, 1 L. P. School, high school and higher secondary school are in Govt sector.

== Life ==
Avala pandi paddy field hosts numerous migratory birds each year. Sacred groves are places of worship and at the same time, traditional method of ecological conservation. Cheruvannur has an immense activity in agriculture particularly in rice cultivation. The area has a good potential for eco-tourism, with its scenic beauty not known much outside, connectivity of roads, sensible people, essential communication and medical facilities.

The major source of income for the people living nearby river, is sand mining from the Kuttiyadi river. Sand mining activity is controlled by grama panchayat, district collector, and district level kadavu committee jointly. This is the major income source to own fund for grama panchayat also.

== Demography ==
As of 2001 India census, Cheruvannur had a population of 22,150. Males constitute 49% of the population and females 51%. Cheruvannur has an average literacy rate of 81%, higher than the national average of 59.5%; with male literacy of 86% and female literacy of 77%. 13% of the population is under 6 years of age.
