= Perambra Assembly constituency =

Constituency of the Kerala legislative assembly in India

Perambra
- Constituency No. 24 for the Kerala Legislative Assembly

Constituency details
- Country: India
- Region: South India
- State: Kerala
- District: Kozhikode
- Established: 1957
- Total electors: 1,98,218 (2021)
- Reservation: None

Member of Legislative Assembly
- 16th Kerala Legislative Assembly
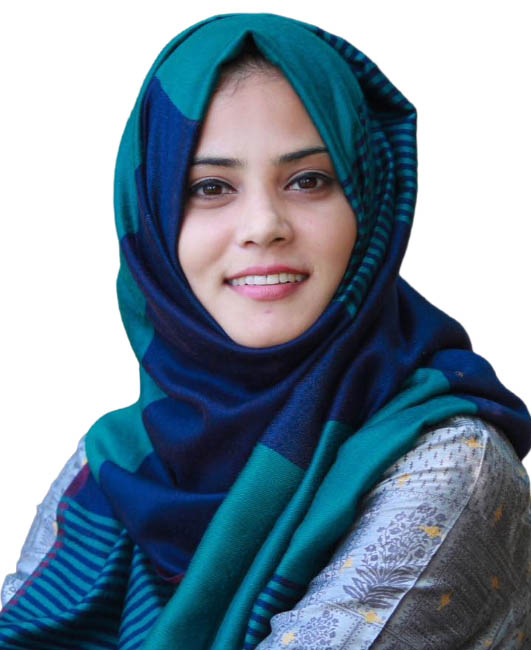
- Incumbent Fathima Thahiliya
- Party: IUML
- Alliance: UDF
- Elected year: 2026

Perambra State assembly constituency is one of the 140 state legislative assembly constituencies in Kerala in southern India. It is also one of the seven state legislative assembly constituencies included in Vatakara Lok Sabha constituency.

== Local self-governed segments ==
Perambra Assembly constituency is composed of the following local self-governed segments:

| Sl no. | Name | Status (Grama panchayat/Municipality) | Taluk |
|---|---|---|---|
| 1 | Arikkulam | Grama panchayat | Koyilandy |
| 2 | Chakkittapara | Grama panchayat | Koyilandy |
| 3 | Changaroth | Grama panchayat | Koyilandy |
| 4 | Cheruvannur | Grama Panchayat | Koyilandy |
| 5 | Keezhariyur | Grama panchayat | Koyilandy |
| 6 | Koothali | Grama panchayat | Koyilandy |
| 7 | Meppayur | Grama panchayat | Koyilandy |
| 8 | Nochad | Grama panchayat | Koyilandy |
| 9 | Perambra | Grama panchayat | Koyilandy |
| 10 | Thurayur | Grama panchayat | Koyilandy |

== Members of the Legislative Assembly ==
| Election | Niyama Sabha | Name | Party | Tenure |
|---|---|---|---|---|
| 1957 | 1st | Kumaran Madathil | Communist Party of India | 1957 – 1960 |
| 1960 | 2nd | P. K. Narayanan Nambiar | Praja Socialist Party | 1960 – 1965 |
| 1967 | 3rd | V. V. Dakshinamoorthi | Communist Party of India (Marxist) | 1967 – 1970 |
| 1970 | 4th | K. G. Adiyodi | Indian National Congress | 1970 – 1977 |
| 1977 | 5th | K. C. Joseph | Kerala Congress | 1977 – 1980 |
| 1980 | 6th | V. V. Dakshinamoorthy | Communist Party of India (Marxist) | 1980 – 1982 |
| 1982 | 7th | A. K. Padmanabhan | Communist Party of India (Marxist) | 1982 – 1987 |
| 1987 | 8th | A. K. Padmanabhan | Communist Party of India (Marxist) | 1987 – 1991 |
| 1991 | 9th | N. K. Radha | Communist Party of India (Marxist) | 1991 – 1996 |
| 1996 | 10th | N. K. Radha | Communist Party of India (Marxist) | 1996 – 2001 |
| 2001 | 11th | T. P. Ramakrishnan | Communist Party of India (Marxist) | 2001 – 2006 |
| 2006 | 12th | K. Kunhammad | Communist Party of India (Marxist) | 2006 – 2011 |
| 2011 | 13th | K. Kunhammad | Communist Party of India (Marxist) | 2011 – 2016 |
| 2016 | 14th | T. P. Ramakrishnan | Communist Party of India (Marxist) | 2016 - 2021 |
| 2021 | 15th | T. P. Ramakrishnan | Communist Party of India (Marxist) | 2021-2026 |
| 2026 | 16th | Fathima Thahiliya | Indian Union Muslim League | 2026- |

== Election results ==
=== 2026 ===
2026 Kerala Legislative Assembly election: Perambara
| Party | Candidate | Votes | % | ±% |
|---|---|---|---|---|
| IUML | Fathima Thahiliya | 81,429 | 47.32 | ▲8.52 |
| CPI(M) | T. P. Ramakrishnan | 76,342 | 44.36 | ▼8.34 |
| BJP | M. Mohanan Master | 13,042 | 7.58 | ▲0.78 |
| NOTA | None of the above | 507 | 0.29 | |
| CPI(ML) Red Star | Akhil Kumar A. M. | 151 | 0.09 | |
| AAP | Renjith Malayil | 124 | 0.07 | |
| Margin of victory | | 5,087 | | |
| Turnout | | 1,72,086 | | |
| IUML gain from CPI(M) | | Swing | | |

=== 2021 ===
There were 1,88,997 registered voters in the constituency for the 2021 Kerala Assembly election.

2021 Kerala Legislative Assembly election:Perambra
| Party | Candidate | Votes | % | ±% |
|---|---|---|---|---|
| CPI(M) | T. P. Ramakrishnan | 86,023 | 52.7 | ▲5.56 |
| Independent | C H Ebrahimkutty | 63,431 | 38.8 | |
| BJP | Adv. K V Sudheer | 11,165 | 6.8 | |
| SDPI | Ismail Kammana | 1,465 | 0.9 | ▲0.23 |
| NOTA | None of the above | 458 | 0.28 | ▼0.12 |
| Margin of victory | | 22,592 | 13.9 | ▲11.22 |
| Turnout | | 1,63,279 | 86.63 | |
| CPI(M) hold | | Swing | | |

=== 2016 ===
There were 1,79,658 registered voters in the constituency for the 2016 election.

2016 Kerala Legislative Assembly election: Perambra
| Party | Candidate | Votes | % | ±% |
|---|---|---|---|---|
| CPI(M) | T. P. Ramakrishnan | 72,359 | 47.14 | ▼4.77 |
| KC(M) | Muhammad Ikbal | 68,258 | 44.46 | ▲3.84 |
| BDJS | Sukumaran Nair | 8,561 | 5.58 | − |
| WPOI | Razak Paleri | 1,673 | 1.09 | − |
| SDPI | K. P. Gopi | 1,036 | 0.67 | ▼0.43 |
| Independent | Muhammed Iqbal Bappubaith | 637 | 0.41 | − |
| NOTA | None of the above | 616 | 0.40 | − |
| CPI(M) | M. T. Muhammad | 224 | 0.15 | − |
| Independent | Muhammad Iqbal Pallath | 148 | 0.10 | − |
| Margin of victory | | 4,101 | 2.68 | ▼8.61 |
| Turnout | | 1,53,512 | 85.45 | ▲0.71 |
| CPI(M) hold | | Swing | ▼4.77 | |

=== 2011 ===
There were 1,59,699 registered voters in the constituency for the 2011 election.

2011 Kerala Legislative Assembly election: Perambra
| Party | Candidate | Votes | % | ±% |
|---|---|---|---|---|
| CPI(M) | K. Kunhammad | 70,248 | 51.91 | |
| KC(M) | Mohammad Ikbal | 54,979 | 40.62 | |
| BJP | P. Chandrika | 7,214 | 5.33 | |
| SDPI | T. K. Kunammad Faisy | 1,494 | 1.10 | − |
| Independent | Akhilkumar | 801 | 0.59 | |
| BSP | K. K. Vasu | 598 | 0.44 | |
| Margin of victory | | 15,269 | 11.29 | |
| Turnout | | 1,35,334 | 84.74 | |
| CPI(M) hold | | Swing | | |

=== 1952 ===
1952 Madras Legislative Assembly election: Perambra
| Party | Candidate | Votes | % | ±% |
|---|---|---|---|---|
| KMPP | Kunhiram Kidavu Polloyil | 20,730 | 44.83% | |
| INC | Kalandankutty, Puthiyottil | 18,222 | 39.41% | 39.41% |
| Socialist Party (India) | Balakrishnan Nair Kolliyil | 7,287 | 15.76% | |
| Margin of victory | | 2,508 | 5.42% | |
| Turnout | | 46,239 | 69.67% | |
| Registered electors | | 66,367 | | |
| KMPP win (new seat) | | | | |

== See also ==
- Perambra
- Kozhikode district
- List of constituencies of the Kerala Legislative Assembly
- 2016 Kerala Legislative Assembly election
