= Arangil Sreedharan =

Indian politician (1923-2001)

Minister of State in the Ministry of Commerce, Government of India
- In office April 1990 – November 1990

Member of Parliament, Lok Sabha
- In office 1967–1970
- Constituency: Vatakara

Member of Parliament, Rajya Sabha
- In office 2 July 1988 – 1 July 1994

Personal details
- Born: 23 March 1923 Vatakara, Malabar District, Madras Presidency, British India
- Died: 13 December 2001 (aged 78) Kozhikode, Kerala, India
- Party: Socialist
- Parents: Gopalan (father); Madhavi Amma (mother)
- Source: ["Rajyasabha members" (PDF). rajyasabha.nic.in.]

Arangil Sreedharan (23 March 1923 – 13 December 2001) was an Indian politician and socialist leader from Kerala. He represented the Vadakara constituency in the Lok Sabha from 1967 to 1970 and served as a member of the Rajya Sabha from 1988 to 1994. He served as Union Minister of State for Commerce in the V. P. Singh ministry from April 1990 to November 1990.

== Biography ==
Sreedharan was born on 23 March 1923 at the Arangil house in Vadakara in present-day Kozhikode district of Kerala to Dr. Gopalan who held a position equivalent to that of a District Medical Officer (DMO) and Madhavi Amma. He received his early education at BEM High School in Vadakara, and earned an honours degree in English from Madura College, Madurai.

Sreedharan died at a private hospital in Kozhikode on December 13, 2001. Following Sreedharan's death, then Indian Defence Minister George Fernandes described him as an outstanding parliamentarian and a leader of India's democratic socialist movement, recalling their work together in campaigns for farmers and the working class.

=== Personal life ===
His wife Dr. T.K. Nalini, was a gynecologist at Vadakara Taluk Hospital.

== Political career ==
In 1937, while studying in the ninth grade at BEM High School in Vadakara, Sreedharan joined the All India Students' Federation, which was banned at the time. Due to this hewas subsequently expelled from the school. A student strike broke out at the school, reportedly the first in its history, and lasted for a week, after which the suspended students were reinstated. This was the beginning of Sreedharan's political life.

Later he was drawn to the Indian independence movement, participated in the Quit India Movement, and joined the Congress Socialist Party shortly before independence.

When efforts were made to reorganise the Congress Socialist Party (CSP) in Malabar, which had become inactive after its formation in 1934, Sreedharan was among those who led the initiative, along with K. B. Menon, K. Kunhirama Kurup and P. M. Kunhiraman Nambiar. At a meeting held in Kozhikode in 1945, the CSP Kerala state committee was formed, with Sreedharan serving as its office secretary. He subsequently travelled across Kerala, working to promote the socialist movement. When the CSP became an independent political party on 26 November 1948, he joined the party.

Sreedharan was in the Socialist party's leadership when it had 19 members in the Kerala Legislative Assembly and four members of Parliament.

In 1969, Sreedharan was reportedly invited by then Indian Prime Minister Indira Gandhi to join the Indian National Congress, with an offer of a Union ministerial position, but declined the offer.

Sreedharan was imprisoned for two years in Viyyur Central Jail, starting in July 1975, for his participation in the struggle against the Emergency in India.

In 1977, when the Janata Party came to power at the national level, Sreedharan was the only member from Kerala among the 26 members of the party's national council. He became the state president of the Janata Party in 1980 and later served as the state president of the Janata Dal when it was formed in 1989. From 1991, he served as the party's national secretary.

When Pattom Thanu Pillai was the Chief Minister of Kerala, Arangil Sreedharan was the sole secretary of the Socialist Party. He had warm relations with Pattom and Muslim League leaders including Abdurrahman Bafaqi and C.H. Muhammad Koya. C. H. has even said that the politician he likes the most after his party leaders is Sreedharan.

Sreedharan became a Member of Parliament in 1967. Although fluent in English, he delivered his maiden parliamentary speech in Malayalam. In his speech, he criticised the lack of facilities for interpreting languages other than English and Hindi and objected to the neglect of languages such as Tamil.

Sreedharan became a member of the Janata Party's national council in 1977 and later served as president of the Janata Dal's state unit. In 1990, he was appointed Union Minister of State for Commerce in the V. P. Singh ministry. He subsequently had differences with the Janata Dal leadership. After a split in Janata Dal in 1996, the splinter group led by Sreedharan has merged with Ramakrishna Hegde's Lok Shakti. When Hegde joined the National Democratic Alliance, he also resigned from Lok Sakthi, but instead of joining NDA he formed the Indian Socialist Party. He subsequently merged the party with the Janata Dal after its state president, M. P. Veerendra Kumar, invited him to return. Later he left active public life due to illness.

=== Electoral history ===
Sreedharan first contested in 1952 Madras State Legislative Assembly election from Nadapuram constituency and finished third. Then in 1967, he contested for Parliament from Vadakara and by securing 65 percent of the votes, he defeated M. K. Prabhakaran of the Indian National Congress with a majority of one and a half lakh votes. He contested from Vadakara in 1972 and 1977 but lost. In the 1980 general election, Sreedharan contested the Kozhikode Lok Sabha constituency as the Janata Party candidate against CPI(M) leader E. K. Imbichi Bava, who won by 40,695 votes. Then he became a member of the Rajya Sabha in 1988. He became the Minister of State for Commerce with Independent Charge in the V.P. Singh cabinet in 1989.

== Legacy ==
In 2017, former Kerala Chief Minister Oommen Chandy presented an award instituted in the name of Arangil Sreedharan to Ramesan Paleri of Uralungal Labour Contract Co-operative Society (ULCSL).

In June 2023, the then Governor of Goa, P. S. Sreedharan Pillai released the ''Arangil Sreedharan Birth Centenary Edition'' published by the Arangil Sreedharan Gandhian Socialist Study Centre, by handing it over to Kozhikode Mayor Beena Philip.

The Arangil Sreedharan Social and Educational Charitable Trust, established in his name, began its activities in 2024. Its office in Kozhikode was inaugurated by M. V. Shreyams Kumar in February 2025.

In December 2025, Kozhikode Mayor O. Sadashivan called on newly elected local self government representatives to adapt Sreedharan's political style and selfless commitment. He made the remarks while inaugurating a memorial event for Sreedharan and a reception for newly elected representatives organised by the Arangil Sreedharan Social and Educational Charitable Trust.
