= Edathumkara =

Village in Kerala, India

Edathumkara is a village in Maniyur Panchayath under Vatakara Taluk, Kozhikode District in Kerala where Vatakara-Mahe canal originates. It is approximately 12 km away from Vatakara Municipal Headquarters.

== Geography ==
A natural hill in the west and a watershed area in the east, Edathumkara is known for its natural environment and for its migrating birds.

== Education ==
M.H.E.S Arts and Science College Cherandathur is situated at Edathumkara.

== Temples ==
Moozhikkal Bhagavathi Temple has a festival which is secular in outlook.
