= Kalleri (Kerala) =

Kalleri is a village area in Vatakara taluk, north of Kozhikode, Kerala, India. Kalleri is located at Vatakara Thanneerpanthal route, 8 km from Vatakara, near Villiappaly. The land of Kalleri is encircled by Kallerikunnu to the west and Aroora mala (mountain) to the east. The famous Kalleri Kuttichathan Temple which is visited by thousands of devotees every week is in Kalleri. The temple, which belonged to Kurukkat tharavadu, is now run by a people's committee.Besides the ritual practiced in the temple, the onus is upon medical service for the needy, social and cultural services. Efforts are on to mitigate social imbalances. Registered under the Societies Act, the temple administration convenes the general body meeting during February last Sunday. 25 members are elected through a secret ballot for a period of one year. The modus operandi of the temple administration is unique.

There is a canal at Kalleri, which is a part of Mahi canal.
