= Vatakara Lok Sabha constituency =

Lok Sabha Constituency in Kerala

Coordinates: 11.6°N 75.6°E

Vatakara KL-3
- Lok Sabha constituency
- Vatakara Lok Sabha constituency

Constituency details
- Country: India
- Region: South India
- State: Kerala
- Assembly constituencies: Thalassery; Kuthuparamba; Vatakara; Kuttiady; Nadapuram; Koyilandy; Perambra
- Established: 1957
- Total electors: 12,86,250 (2019)
- Reservation: None

Member of Parliament
- 18th Lok Sabha
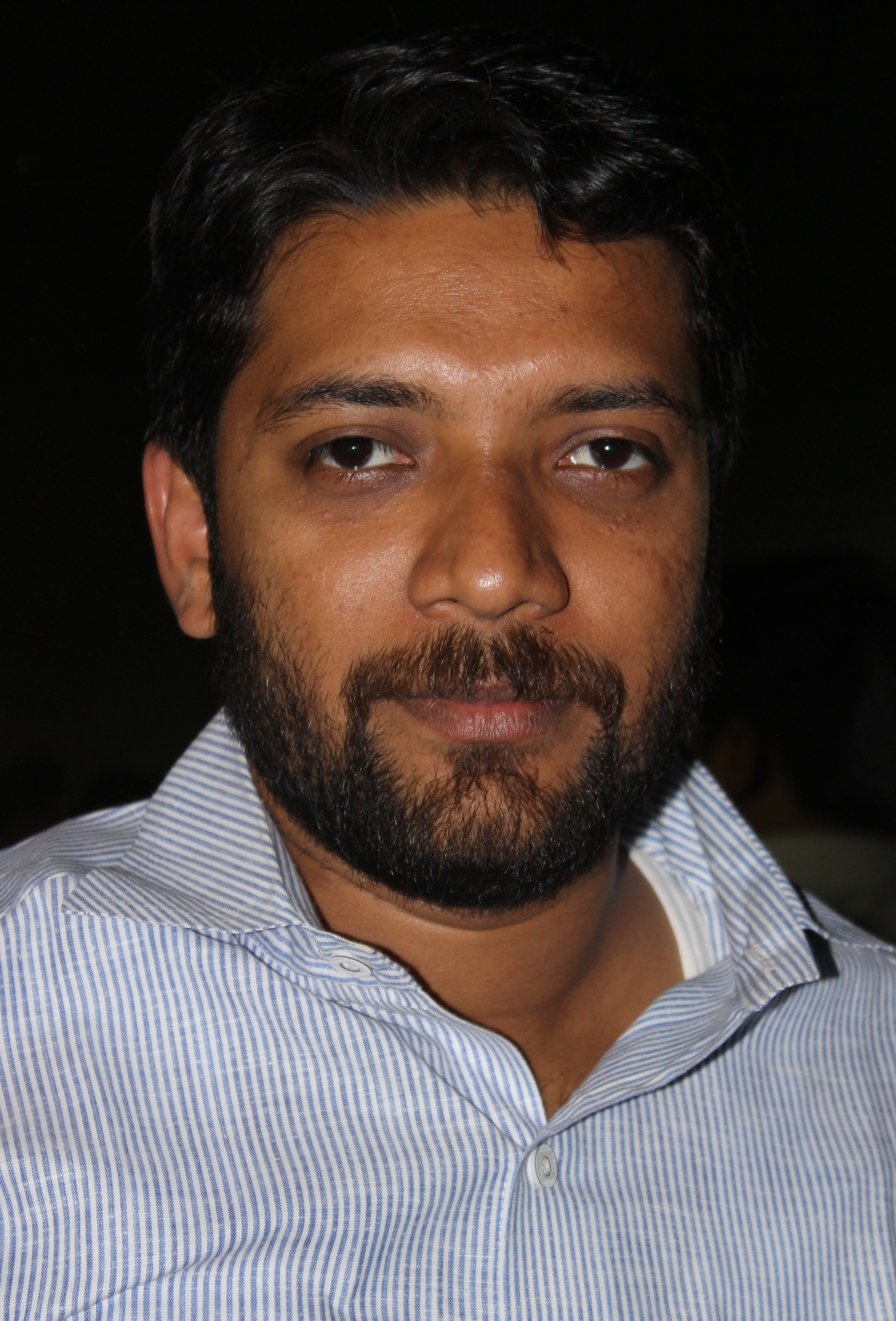
- Incumbent Shafi Parambil
- Party: INC
- Alliance: UDF
- Elected year: 2024
- Preceded by: K. Muraleedharan

Vatakara Lok Sabha constituency is one of the 20 Lok Sabha (parliamentary) constituencies in Kerala state in southern India.

== Assembly segments ==
Vatakara Lok Sabha constituency is composed of the following assembly segments:

No	Name	District	Member	Party	2024 Lead
13	Thalassery	Kannur	Karayi Rajan	CPI(M)	CPI(M)
14	Kuthuparamba	Kannur	P. K. Praveen	RJD	INC
20	Vatakara	Kozhikode	K. K. Rema	RMPI	INC
21	Kuttiady	Kozhikode	Parakkal Abdulla	IUML	INC
22	Nadapuram	Kozhikode	K. M. Abhijith	INC	INC
23	Koyilandy	Kozhikode	Praveen Kumar	INC	INC
24	Perambra	Kozhikode	Fathima Thahiliya	IUML	INC

== Members of Parliament ==
Year	Member	Party
1957	K. B. Menon	Praja Socialist Party
1962	A. V. Raghavan	Independent
1967	Arangil Sreedharan	Samyukta Socialist Party
1971	K. P. Unnikrishnan	Indian National Congress
1977	K. P. Unnikrishnan	Indian National Congress
1980	K. P. Unnikrishnan	Indian National Congress (U)
1984	K. P. Unnikrishnan	Indian Congress (Socialist)
1989	K. P. Unnikrishnan	Indian Congress (Socialist) – Sarat Chandra Sinha
1991	K. P. Unnikrishnan	Indian Congress (Socialist) – Sarat Chandra Sinha
1996	O. Bharathan	Communist Party of India (Marxist)
1998	A.K. Premajam	Communist Party of India (Marxist)
1999	A.K. Premajam	Communist Party of India (Marxist)
2004	P. Satheedevi	Communist Party of India (Marxist)
2009	Mullappally Ramachandran	Indian National Congress
2014	Mullappally Ramachandran	Indian National Congress
2019	K. Muraleedharan	Indian National Congress
2024	Shafi Parambil	Indian National Congress

== Election results ==
Vote share of Winning candidates
2024	49.65%
2019	49.81%
2014	43.41%
2009	48.82%
2004	51.81%
1999	47.15%
1998	48.50%
1996	51.17%
1991	49.97%
1989	46.76%
1984	46.67%
1980	54.15%
1977	50.81%
1971	52.88%
1967	65.20%
1962	60.86%
1957	37.68%

=== General Elections 2029 ===
2029 Indian general election: Vatakara
Party	Candidate	Votes	%	±%
INC	Shafi Parambil			
LDF				
NDA				
NOTA	None of the above			
Margin of victory				
Turnout				
		Swing		

=== General Election 2024 ===
2024 Indian general election: Vatakara
Party	Candidate	Votes	%	±%
INC	Shafi Parambil	557,528	49.65%	▼0.16%
CPI(M)	K. K. Shailaja	4,43,022	39.45%	▼2.36%
BJP	C. R. Praful Krishnan	1,11,979	9.97%	▲2.39%
Independent	Shafi T. P	3,764	0.34%	
Independent	K. K. Shylaja	1,179	0.1%	
Independent	Kunhikannan Payyoli	869	0.08%	
Independent	Shylaja	680	0.06%	
Independent	Shafi	422	0.04%	
Independent	Sylaja. P	326	0.03%	
Independent	Muralidharan	269	0.02%	
NOTA	None of the above	2,909	0.26%	▼.06%
Majority		1,14,506	10.19	▲2.18
Turnout		11,29,256	79.26	
Registered electors				▲
INC hold		Swing	▼.16%	

By Assembly Segments
No.	Status (Assembly Constituency)	Votes			Lead
No.	Status (Assembly Constituency)	Shafi Parambil	K. K. Shailaja	C. R. Praful Krishnan	Lead
13	Thalassery	53,449	62,079	18,869	8,630
14	Kuthuparamba	72,134	61,242	20,710	10,892
20	Vatakara	72,366	50,284	13,612	22,082
21	Kuttiady	91,782	68,147	11,586	23,635
22	Nadapuram	95,767	71,890	12,451	23,877
23	Koyilandy	82,099	58,036	20,699	24,063
24	Perambra	84,125	65,040	12,485	19,085

=== General Elections 2019 ===
2019 Indian general election : Vatakara
Party	Candidate	Votes	%	±%
INC	K. Muraleedharan	526,755	49.81%	6.40%
CPI(M)	P. Jayarajan	4,42,092	41.81%	−1.26%
BJP	V. K. Sajeevan	80,128	7.58%	−0.38%
SDPI	Musthafa Kommeri	5,544	0.52%	−1.05%
National Labour Party	Jatheesh.A.P	2,833	0.27%	
Independent	Santhosh Kumar	1,295	0.12%	
Independent	Muraleedharan.K Sandram	910	0.09%	
Independent	Jayarajan Pandaraparambil	690	0.06%	
Independent	C. O. T. Naseer	612	0.06%	
Independent	Muraleedharan. K Kuttiyil Veedu	597	0.06%	
CPI(ML) Red Star	Advocate K. Sudhakaran	507	0.05%	
Independent	Aluva Aneesh	241	0.02%	
NOTA	None of the Above	3,473	0.32%	−0.32%
Margin of victory		84,663	8.01%	7.66%
Turnout		10,57,440	82.70%	0.91%
Registered electors		12,88,926		9.00%
INC hold		Swing	6.40%	

By Assembly Segments
No.	Status (Assembly Constituency)	Votes			Lead
No.	Status (Assembly Constituency)	K. Muraleedharan	P. Jayarajan	V. K. Sajeevan	Lead
13	Thalassery	53,932	65,401	13,456	11,469
14	Kuthuparamba	68,492	64,359	15,303	4,133
20	Vatakara	71,162	48,199	9,469	22,963
21	Kuttiady	83,628	65,736	7,851	17,892
22	Nadapuram	87,061	69,465	8,408	17,596
23	Koyilandy	79,800	58,755	16,588	21,045
24	Perambra	80,929	67,725	8,505	13,024

=== General Elections 2014 ===
2014 Indian general election : Vatakara
Party	Candidate	Votes	%	±%
INC	Mullappally Ramachandran	416,479	43.37%	−5.45%
CPI(M)	A. N. Shamseer	4,13,173	43.03%	0.72%
BJP	V. K. Sajeevan	76,313	7.95%	3.27%
Independent	P. Kumarankutty	17,229	1.79%	
SDPI	P. Abdul Hameed Master	15,058	1.57%	
AAP	Ali Akbar	6,245	0.65%	
Independent	A. P. Shamseer	3,485	0.36%	
BSP	Saseendran	2,150	0.22%	
Independent	P. Sharafudeen	1,679	0.17%	
Independent	Attuveppil Kunhikkannan	731	0.08%	
Independent	A. M. Smitha	693	0.07%	
NOTA	None of the Above	6,107	0.64%	
Margin of victory		3,306	0.34%	−6.17%
Turnout		9,59,342	81.21%	0.58%
Registered electors		11,82,504		10.39%
INC hold		Swing	-5.41%	

By Assembly Segments
No.	Status (Assembly Constituency)	Votes			Lead
No.	Status (Assembly Constituency)	Mullappally Ramachandran	A. N. Shamseer	V. K. Sajeevan	Lead
13	Thalassery	41,365	64,404	11,780	23,039
14	Kuthuparamba	54,761	59,486	14,774	4,725
20	Vatakara	57,656	42,315	9,061	15,341
21	Kuttiady	68,177	61,912	8,087	6,265
22	Nadapuram	68,103	66,356	9,107	1,747
23	Koyilandy	62,371	55,745	14,093	6,626
24	Perambra	63,012	61,837	9,325	1,175

=== General Elections 2009 ===
2009 Indian general election : Vatakara
Party	Candidate	Votes	%	±%
INC	Mullappally Ramachandran	421,255	48.82%	12.77%
CPI(M)	P. Sathidevi	3,65,069	42.31%	−9.50%
BJP	K. P Sreesan	40,391	4.68%	−5.20%
Independent	T. P. Chandrasekharan	21,833	2.53%	
BSP	K. Noorudheen Musaliar	4,481	0.52%	
Independent	Satheedevi	3836	0.44%	
Independent	P. Sathidevi Pallikkal	3,228	0.37%	
Independent	Naroth Ramachandran	2,751	0.32%	
Margin of victory		56,186	6.51%	−9.25%
Turnout		8,62,844	80.58%	4.74%
Registered electors		10,71,171		−1.98%
INC gain from CPI(M)		Swing	-2.99%	

=== General Elections 2004 ===
2004 Indian general election : Vatakara
Party	Candidate	Votes	%	±%
CPI(M)	P. Sathidevi	429,294	51.81%	4.67%
INC	M. T. Padma	2,98,705	36.05%	−8.08%
BJP	K. P. Sreesan	81,901	9.89%	2.59%
Independent	K. T. Kunhikannan	7,482	0.90%	
Independent	Dr. K. N. Ajoy Kumar	7,306	0.88%	
Independent	T. K. Kalandan Haje	3,845	0.46%	
Margin of victory		1,30,589	15.76%	12.75%
Turnout		8,28,533	75.83%	1.25%
Registered electors		10,92,826		−5.46%
CPI(M) hold		Swing	4.67%	

=== General Elections 1999 ===
1999 Indian general election : Vatakara
Party	Candidate	Votes	%	±%
CPI(M)	A. K. Premajam	404,355	47.15%	−1.35%
INC	P. M. Suresh Babu	3,78,511	44.13%	2.67%
BJP	O. K. Vasumaster	62,593	7.30%	−0.97%
Independent	Dr. K. N. Ajoy Kumar	10,708	1.25%	
Independent	Kalanthan Haji T. K	894	0.10%	
Independent	Ramachandran	577	0.97%	
Margin of victory		25,844	3.01%	−4.02%
Turnout		8,57,638	74.57%	−1.16%
Registered electors		11,55,934		2.74%
CPI(M) hold		Swing	-4.02%	

=== General Elections 1998 ===
1998 Indian general election : Vatakara
Party	Candidate	Votes	%	±%
CPI(M)	A. K. Premajam	407,876	48.50%	−2.67%
INC	P. M. Suresh Babu	3,48,715	41.47%	0.13%
BJP	Chettoor Balakrishnan Master	69,564	8.27%	2.12%
INL	P. K. Radhakrishnan	11,965	1.42%	
Margin of victory		59,161	7.03%	−2.80%
Turnout		8,40,958	75.13%	−0.60%
Registered electors		11,25,076		3.24%
CPI(M) hold		Swing	-2.67%	

=== General Elections 1996 ===
1996 Indian general election : Vatakara
Party	Candidate	Votes	%	±%
CPI(M)	O. Bharathan	415,895	51.17%	
INC	K. P. Unnikrishnan	3,35,950	41.33%	
BJP	A. D. Nair	49,971	6.15%	
Margin of victory		79,945	9.84%	7.63%
Turnout		8,12,773	75.73%	−1.95%
Registered electors		10,89,716		5.77%
CPI(M) gain from INS(SCS)		Swing	1.20%	

=== General Elections 1991 ===
1991 Indian general election : Vatakara
Party	Candidate	Votes	%	±%
INS(SCS)	K. P. Unnikrishnan	395,501	49.97%	
Independent	M. Ratnasingh	3,78,012	47.76%	
Independent	P. Unnikrishnan	8,566	1.08%	
JP	S. K. Madhavan	4,213	0.53%	
Margin of victory		17,489	2.21%	1.17%
Turnout		7,91,474	77.67%	−3.18%
Registered electors		10,30,244		4.67%
INS(SCS) hold		Swing	3.21%	

=== General Elections 1989 ===
1989 Indian general election : Vatakara
Party	Candidate	Votes	%	±%
INS(SCS)	K. P. Unnikrishnan	370,434	46.76%	
INC	A. Sujanapal	3,62,225	45.73%	
BJP	P. K. Krishnadas	45,558	5.75%	−0.08%
Independent	T. K. Kalandan Haji	6,198	0.78%	
Margin of victory		8,209	1.04%	−0.86%
Turnout		7,92,162	80.85%	2.04%
Registered electors		9,84,309		32.94%
INS(SCS) gain from IC(S)		Swing	0.10%	

=== General Elections 1984 ===
1984 Indian general election : Vatakara
Party	Candidate	Votes	%	±%
IC(S)	K. P. Unnikrishnan	270,416	46.67%	
Independent	K. M. Radhakrishnan	2,59,437	44.77%	
BJP	A. D. Nair	33,781	5.83%	
Independent	B. M. Sasthri	10,556	1.82%	
Margin of victory		10,979	1.89%	−6.41%
Turnout		5,79,462	78.81%	4.96%
Registered electors		7,40,431		7.99%
IC(S) gain from INC(U)		Swing	-7.49%	

=== General Elections 1980 ===
1980 Indian general election : Vatakara
Party	Candidate	Votes	%	±%
INC(U)	K. P. Unnikrishnan	271,796	54.15%	
INC(I)	Mullappally Ramachandran	2,30,114	45.85%	
Margin of victory		41,682	8.30%	6.69%
Turnout		5,01,910	73.85%	−9.13%
Registered electors		6,85,632		12.20%
INC(U) gain from INC		Swing	3.34%	

=== General Elections 1977 ===
1977 Indian general election : Vatakara
Party	Candidate	Votes	%	±%
INC	K. P. Unnikrishnan	253,462	50.81%	−2.07%
BLD	Arangil Sreedharan	2,45,392	49.19%	
Margin of victory		8,070	1.62%	−13.75%
Turnout		4,98,854	82.98%	15.92%
Registered electors		6,11,107		7.83%
INC hold		Swing	-2.07%	

=== General Elections 1971 ===
1971 Indian general election : Vatakara
Party	Candidate	Votes	%	±%
INC	K. P. Unnikrishnan	198,939	52.88%	18.08%
Independent	A. V. Raghavan	1,41,135	37.52%	
Indian Socialist Party	Arangil Sreedharan	33,893	9.01%	
Independent	Leela Damodara Menon	2,236	0.59%	
Margin of victory		57,804	15.37%	−15.03%
Turnout		3,76,203	67.06%	−7.46%
Registered electors		5,66,738		22.39%
INC gain from SSP		Swing	-12.32%	

=== General Elections 1967 ===
1967 Indian general election : Vatakara
Party	Candidate	Votes	%	±%
SSP	Arangil Sreedharan	215,597	65.20%	
INC	M. K. Prabhakaran	1,15,094	34.80%	
Margin of victory		1,00,503	30.39%	8.68%
Turnout		3,30,691	74.51%	0.44%
Registered electors		4,63,046		−0.10%
SSP gain from Independent		Swing	4.34%	

=== General Elections 1962 ===
1962 Indian general election : Vatakara
Party	Candidate	Votes	%	±%
Independent	A. V. Raghavan	204,315	60.86%	
PSP	K. B. Menon	1,31,408	39.14%	
Margin of victory		72,907	21.72%	15.35%
Turnout		3,35,723	74.07%	7.94%
Registered electors		4,63,498		3.66%
Independent gain from PSP		Swing	23.17%	

=== General Elections 1957 ===
1957 Indian general election : Vatakara
Party	Candidate	Votes	%	±%
PSP	K. B. Menon	111,425	37.68%	
INC	Gopalan Karipur	92,606	31.32%	
CPI	P. Ramunni Nambiar	91,651	31.00%	
Margin of victory		18,819	6.36%	
Turnout		2,95,682	66.13%	
Registered electors		4,47,129		
PSP win (new seat)				

== See also ==
- 2024 Indian general election in Kerala
- List of constituencies of the Lok Sabha
- Vatakara
