= Chennamangalam Temple =

Ayyappan Temple in Kozhikode district, Kerala, India

- Chennamangalam Temple, Chorode, Kozhikode, Kerala

Religion
- Affiliation: Hinduism
- District: Kozhikode
- Deity: Ayyappan

Location
- Location: Chorode
- State: Kerala
- Country: India
- Interactive map of Chennamangalam Temple
- Coordinates: 11.6208°N 75.5849°E

Architecture
- Type: Architecture of Kerala

Specifications
- Temple: One
- Elevation: 41.5 m (136 ft)

Chennamangalam Temple is situated in Chorode Panchayat of Vatakara Taluka in Kozhikode District of Kerala, India.The main Pratishtha is Lord Ayyappa. However Lords Shiva, Ganesh, Vishnu and Annapurneshwari are also worshipped in this temple.

This is considered as one of oldest temples in Kerala, and also one of the very few temples which has Dhwaja Prathishta. This is situated 2 km from town and is near to Chorode. The main prathista is Lord Shiva and Lord Ayyappa. This temple is also known as second Sabarimala. Few years back there was a big fire in Sabarimala and many people were not able to go there. At this time many people had come to this temple instead.

A huge renovation was undertaken in 2018 with the help of locals nearby. The temples rooftops which had been there since its initial days were replaced with new teak wood.

The temple utsav happens generally in the month of April. It is one of the rarest temples which still promotes Indian traditional art forms over stage shows during its utsav.

Regular bhajans are held during the Sabarimala season. However every evening there is a bhajan group who circles the temple enchanting the bhajans which adds to the aura of the place.
