= K. Kunhammad =

Indian politician

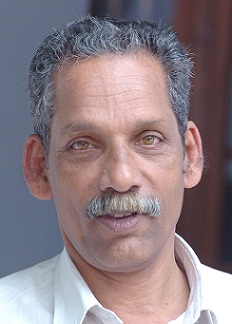
- K. Kunhammad in 2005

Member of the Kerala Legislative Assembly
- In office 2006–2016
- Preceded by: T. P. Ramakrishnan
- Succeeded by: T. P. Ramakrishnan
- Constituency: Perambra

Personal details
- Born: 1 May 1949 (age 77) Nochat
- Party: Communist Party of India (Marxist)
- Spouse: Fathima
- Children: 4

K. Kunhammad is an Indian politician who served as a member of 13th Kerala Legislative Assembly representing the Communist Party of India (Marxist) from Perambra. He was previously elected to Kerala Legislative Assembly in 2006 from the same constituency.

== Political life ==
He was the District President and State Committee Member of D.Y.F.I. He served as the president of Perambra Grama Panchayat from 1988 to 2001.

== Personal life ==
He was born on 1 May 1949 at Nochat. He is the son of Ibrayi and Pathu. He is a retired teacher. He is married to Fathima and has one daughter and three sons.
