= Kumaran Madathil =

Indian politician

Kumaran Madathil (15 July 1920 – 30 March 1995) was an Indian politician and leader of Communist Party of India. He represented Perambra constituency in 1st Kerala Legislative Assembly and Nadapuram constituency in 4th Kerala Legislative Assembly.
