= K. P. Unnikrishnan =

Indian politician (1936–2026)

- കെ.പി. ഉണ്ണികൃഷ്ണൻ

Union Minister of Surface Transport
- In office 6 December 1989 – 10 November 1990
- Prime Minister: V. P. Singh
- Preceded by: Rajesh Pilot
- Succeeded by: Manubhai Kotadia

Union Minister of Communications
- In office 6 December 1989 – 23 April 1990
- Prime Minister: V. P. Singh
- Preceded by: Giridhar Gamang
- Succeeded by: Janeshwar Mishra

Member of Parliament, Lok Sabha
- In office 25 March 1971 – 12 May 1996
- Preceded by: A. Sreedharan
- Succeeded by: O. Bharathan
- Constituency: Vatakara

Personal details
- Born: 20 September 1936 Coimbatore, Madras Presidency, British India (present-day Tamil Nadu, India)
- Died: 3 March 2026 (aged 89) Kozhikode, Kerala, India
- Party: Indian National Congress (I)
- Spouse: Amrita Unnikrishnan (m. 1977)
- Children: 2
- Education: Madras Christian College, Chennai
- Profession: Journalist; Social worker; Writer
- As of 23 September, 2006

K. P. Unnikrishnan (20 September 1936 – 3 March 2026) was an Indian politician and writer who was a Union Minister and parliamentarian of Vatakara constituency.

== Early life and education ==
Unnikrishnan was born on 20 September 1936 to a family from the Malabar Coast. His father's name was E. Kunhikannan Nair. He was educated at the Madras Christian College, Chennai. He also completed his law at Chennai. In 1977, he married Amrita Unnikrishnan. Together, they had two daughters.

== Career ==
Unnikrishnan was associated with the Socialist Party and the Praja Socialist Party during his youth. In the 1960s, he joined the Indian National Congress and became a member of the All India Congress Committee in 1962. He wrote articles for the Mathrubhumi and other periodicals as a special correspondent.

He entered into the electoral foray when he first represented Vatakara constituency in 1971 as an Indian National Congress candidate. He remained unbeaten in the next five Lok Sabha polls (1977, 1980, 1984, 1989, 1991) despite switching over to the Indian National Congress (U) in 1980 and later to the Indian Congress (Socialist) in 1984. In the period 1981–84, he was the leader of Congress (Secular) in the parliament. In the period 1980–82, he was also a member of the Public Accounts Committee. He served as the Minister for Telecommunications, Shipping, Surface Transport in the Vishwanath Pratap Singh ministry (1989–90). During his tenure as minister he oversaw the evacuation of Indians during the Gulf War.

His only defeat in the constituency came in 1996. Unnikrishnan later quit active politics, shifted his base to New Delhi and then to his ancestral house at Panniyankara in Kozhikode district, and dedicated himself to reading and writing books.

== Death ==
Unnikrishnan died on 3 March 2026, at the age of 89.
