= Thinoor =

- village
- Country: India
- State: Kerala
- District: Kozhikode
- Talukas: Vatakara

Languages
  - Official: Malayalam, English
- Time zone: UTC+5:30 (IST)
- PIN: 673507
- Vehicle registration: KL 18 vadakara

Thinoor is a village in Kozhikode district in the state of Kerala, India.

== Transportation ==
Thinoor village connects to other parts of India through Vatakara city on the west and Kuttiady town on the east. National highway No.66 passes through Vatakara and the northern stretch connects to Mangalore, Goa and Mumbai. The southern stretch connects to Cochin and Trivandrum. The eastern Highway going through Kuttiady connects to Mananthavady, Mysore and Bangalore. The nearest airports are at Kannur and Kozhikode. The nearest railway station is at Vatakara.
