= Sargaalaya Crafts Village =

Sargaalaya
- Saargalaya Boating Facility

- Location within Kerala

General information
- Type: Crafts village
- Architectural style: Ethnic
- Location: Iringal, Vatakara, Kozhikode, Kerala, India
- Coordinates: 11.5601°N 75.6058°E
- Opened: 19 February 2011
- Owner: Uralungal Labour Contract Co-operative Society

Website
- sargaalaya.in

Sargaalaya is a 20-acre (8.1 ha) arts and crafts village in Iringal, near Vatakara in the Kozhikode district of Kerala, India. It was established at a cost of around 15 crores on 19 February 2011 by The Kerala Tourism Department. It was inaugurated by the then Home and Tourism Minister, Mr Kodiyeri Balakrishnan and the Uralungal Labour Contract Co-operative Society received the contract to manage the crafts village for a period of ten years.

The Kerala State Tourism award function is also held at the crafts village. Sargaalaya has over 60 stalls selling various ethnic crafts and it also houses The Crafts Design and Technology development centre, which provides training for craftsmen to learn new techniques in traditional handicrafts.

== Sargaalaya International Arts & Crafts Festival ==
The annual Sargaalaya International Arts & Crafts Festival is held here from 20 December to 5 January. The 2016 Sargalaya Festival had over 350 artisans from all over the world register for the Festival. It is also considered to be South India's biggest handicraft fair. Around two hundred thousand (lakh) people visited the festival in 2015.

== Boating ==
The village also has recreational boating facility, as it is situated on the banks of the Kuttiady River. Both rowing and paddle boats are available.
