= Vilangad =

- Village
- Location in Kerala, India Vilangad (India)
- Coordinates: 11°42′0″N 75°40′0″E
- Country: India
- State: Kerala
- District: Kozhikode
- Talukas: Vatakara

Population (2011)
  - Total: 3,778

Languages
  - Official: Malayalam, English
- Time zone: UTC+5:30 (IST)
- PIN: 673506
- Telephone code: 0496
- Vehicle registration: KL-18
- Lok Sabha constituency: Vatakara
- Vidhan Sabha constituency: Nadapuram

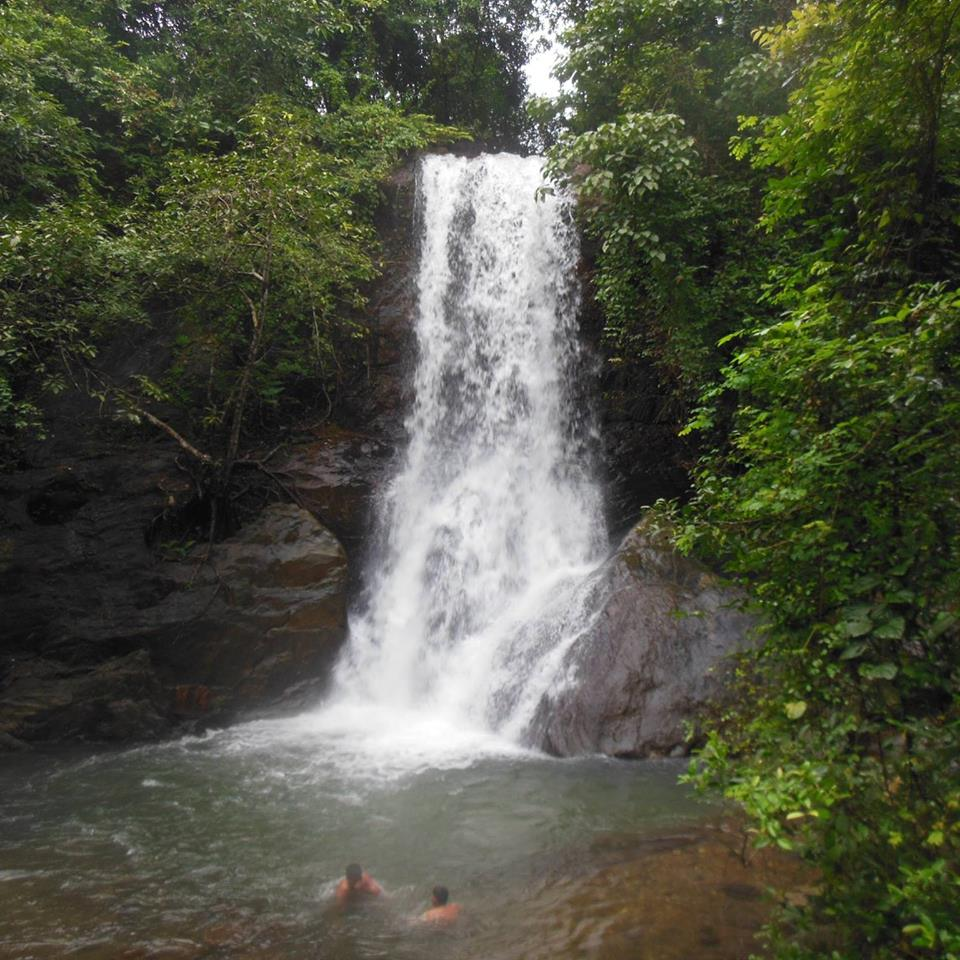
Thirikakkayam water fall

Vilangad is a village in Kozhikode district in the state of Kerala, India. It is located 73 km (45 mi) north of the district headquarters Kozhikode and 35 km (22 mi) northeast of taluk headquarters Vatakara, bordering Wayanad and Kannur districts.

== History ==
Vilangad has been inhabited since 1942. St. George's High School Vilangad was established in 1957.

== Attractions ==
=== Thirikakkayam waterfall ===
The waterfall is situated near Chelekavu temple and is located 5 km away from Vilangad.

=== Vilangad mini-hydroelectric project ===
The village’s 7.5-MW mini-hydroelectric project was commissioned in 2014. The project consists of two small dams at Panom and Valook, two canals, a fore-bay tank, penstock, and three 2.5 MW generators.

=== Pullippara ===
Pullippara is an important trekking destination near Vilangad.

== Transportation ==
Vilangad village connects to other parts of India through Vatakara city on the west and Kuttiady town on the east. National highway No. 66 passes through Vatakara and the northern stretch connects to Mangalore, Goa and Mumbai. The southern stretch connects to Cochin and Trivandrum. The eastern Highway going through Kuttiady connects to Mananthavady, Mysore and Bangalore. The nearest airports are at Kannur and Kozhikode. The nearest railway station is at Vatakara.

Village Data (State Census 2011)

Particulars	Total	Male	Female
Total No. of Houses	916	-	-
Population	3,778	1,930	1,848
Child (0-6)	408	211	197
Schedule Caste	9	4	5
Schedule Tribe	907	467	440
Literacy	90.12 %	92.84 %	87.28 %
Total Workers	1,710	1,133	577
Main Workers	1,158	0	0
Marginal Workers	552	264	288

== Notable events in Vilangad ==
On 30 July 2024, at approximately 05:45 IST, a landslide occurred in Vilangad, Vanimal Gram panchayat, Kozhikode district in the Indian state of Kerala. The landslide was caused by heavy rains and resulted in at least one death.
