= Fathima Thahiliya =

Indian politician and advocate (born 1993)

- ഫാത്തിമ തഹ്‌ലിയ
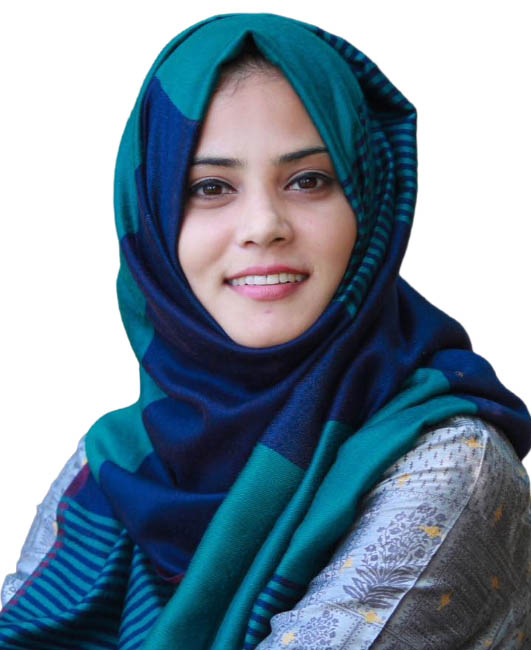

Member of the Kerala Legislative Assembly
- Incumbent
- Assumed office 2026
- Preceded by: T. P. Ramakrishnan
- Constituency: Perambra

State Secretary, Muslim Youth League
- In office 2024–2026

Councillor, Kozhikode Municipal Corporation
- Incumbent
- Assumed office 2025
- Constituency: Kuttichira ward

National Vice-President, Muslim Students Federation
- In office 2019–2021

Personal details
- Born: 5 September 1993 (age 33) Peruvayal, Kozhikode district, Kerala, India
- Citizenship: Indian
- Party: Indian Union Muslim League
- Spouse: Shahasad
- Education: Government Law College, Kozhikode (BA;LL.B); Government Law College, Thrissur (LLM, 2017)
- Occupation: Advocate, politician

Fathima Thahiliya (ഫാത്തിമ തഹ്‌ലിയ; [faːt̪ʰima t̪ahlijaː]; born 5 September 1993) is an Indian politician and advocate. She is a member of the Kerala Legislative Assembly, representing the Perambra Assembly constituency for the IUML since 2026. She is the first woman elected to the state legislature under the IUML banner.

== Early life and education ==
Thahiliya was born on 5 September 1993 in Peruvayal, Kozhikode district, Kerala. She obtained a BA LLB from Government Law College, Kozhikode and an LLM from Government Law College, Thrissur in 2017. She practises as an advocate at the Kozhikode District Court. Her husband, Shahasad, is an advocate at the Kerala High Court.

== Political career ==
=== Muslim Students Federation and Haritha ===
Thahiliya joined the Muslim Students Federation (MSF), the student wing of the IUML, and rose to national vice-president. In 2012 she was a founding leader of Haritha, the women's wing of the MSF. She served as a Senate member of the University of Calicut from 2015 to 2016, and as a member of SAMAAGATI, a committee constituted by the Kerala State Higher Education Council to safeguard gender justice on campuses.

=== Kozhikode Municipal Corporation (2025) ===
In the 2025 Kerala local body elections, Thahiliya was elected councillor for the Kuttichira ward of the Kozhikode Municipal Corporation with a majority of 2,273 votes.

=== Muslim Youth League (2024) ===
In April 2024, Thahiliya was appointed State Secretary of the Muslim Youth League, the youth wing of the IUML, becoming the first woman to hold a position on the organisation's state committee.

=== 2026 Kerala Legislative Assembly election ===
Thahiliya was selected as the IUML candidate for Perambra in Kozhikode district for the 2026 Kerala Legislative Assembly election. Before 2026, the IUML had fielded a woman candidate for the state assembly on only one previous occasion, in 1996, without success.

The Perambra constituency had been held by the Communist Party of India (Marxist) continuously since 1980. The incumbent, T. P. Ramakrishnan, was the LDF convenor and a former minister, who had won the seat in 2021 by over 22,000 votes. Congress leader Rahul Gandhi held a campaign rally in Perambra in support of Thahiliya on 31 March 2026.

Voting was held on 9 April 2026 and results were declared on 4 May 2026. Thahiliya won the seat with 81,429 votes, defeating Ramakrishnan, who polled 76,342 votes, by a margin of 5,087.

Perambra constituency result, 2026 Kerala Legislative Assembly election
Candidate	Party	Votes	Margin
Fathima Thahiliya	Indian Union Muslim League	81,429	+5,087
T. P. Ramakrishnan	Communist Party of India (Marxist)	76,342	—

Eleven women were elected to the Kerala Legislative Assembly in the 2026 polls — nine from the United Democratic Front and two from the Left Democratic Front.

== Electoral history ==
Election	Constituency	Party	Votes	Result
2026	Perambra	Indian Union Muslim League	81,429	Won
