= Muyippoth =

Village in Kerala, India

Muyippoth is an agricultural village in Cheruvannur Grama Panchayat, a part of Perambra Legislative Assembly Constituency in Koyilandi Taluk of Kozhikode District. Surrounded by the Kuttyadi river on three sides, about 40% of the area of Muyippoth village is vast paddy fields. There are many scenic spots in this village, which also includes small hills and plains. Muyippoth is also an important cultural center of Kozhikode district: this village has given birth to many famous personalities in various fields.

The nearest major railway station is Vadakara. Payyoli is another railway station.The national highway passing through Vadakara connects this town with other parts of India. Vadakara is 13 km far from muyippoth, Perambra 8 km far from Muyippoth. Vadakara city lies to the northwest of Muyippoth, Peramba to the east, Payoli to the west and Mepayur and Koilandi to the south. It is a village with easy travel and road facilities to all areas. It is a region that has made its presence known long ago in the political and social spheres This area has a history of struggle of Congress movement during the freedom struggle and communist movement against exploitation ' Michabhoomi strike also held in Edacherichalil by Communist workers, Muyippoth served as a volunteer camp for the historic Koothali movement against British Rule In the 1940s, farmers' groups marched out from Muyippoth via the Kuttyadi river in boat to clear the Koothali estate and cultivate it.

This is an area where Hindu and Muslim communities live together. Expatriates play a major role in the economic structure Apart from the agriculture sector, many people work in the government service, mostly teachers and health workers.

== Education ==
Many educational institutes are functioning here Muippoth LP School was started in 1860. it is the First School in Koyilandy Taluk Apart from this, famous schools like Muyippoth Mapila UP School, Muyippoth East LP School and Vennarod LP School are functioning in this small area. The fact that these four schools are centuries old shows the history of educational progress of the region.

== Worship places ==
There are many temples and Muslim places of worship here where the Hindu Muslim community lives with great love and cooperation.The Sri Shala Puram Temple, a rare Sankara Narayan temple in Malabar, is located here. The historic Sri Shalapuram Cattle Market and Festival is held here. Apart from this, the festival is attended by thousands of people at Eravat Kandi Dharmabhagavathy Temple, Kottachal Bhagavathy Temple, Kamprath Kalari Bhagavathy Temple, Pativattam Shiva Temple, Moiloth Temple, Chatoth Meethal Temple, Ambali Temple, Kottail Shiva Temple Neeturutti, Temple etc. are important Hindu temples. Apart from this there are many Kavs here. The famous Parakool Juma Masjid is located in Muyippoth town. The tomb of Vadakara Waliullahi Muhammad Haji, a well-known Sufi of Kerala, is located at Muyippoth. Many pilgrims visit here. Apart from this, there are small mosques in West, Chemprat Kulam, Chaniyam Kadav Chungam, Thekum Murri.

== Sports ==
The area is famous for sports and the main activities are volleyball, football and cricket. The wide ground at Nirappamkunn is a sign of the sports progress of this village.

== Personalities ==
Many people who have made their mark in the field of art, society and culture were born here. Famous movie playback singer Asalatha, Swami Chidanandapuri, Vadakara Thangal, Areekal Mussiliyar Dr. PT Gopalan, T.V. Balan, famous poet PR Ratheesh, singer Deepak JR and others are born In Muyippoth.

== Places to see ==
Purakammala, which is a storehouse of biodiversity, is the highest area of Muyippoth The views from this Mala are very beautiful. At the foot of this mountain, Karuvod field, which is the paddy field of Kozhikode district, is spread over three panchayats. Most of this field is located in Muyippoth. Located in the Muyippoth Karuvode field, Jammyapara Pond is a place of attraction for visitors.

== Places ==
Muyippoth town, Padinjarakkara, Thekkumuri, Nirappankkunnu, Edacherichalil, Viyyanchira, Chunkam, vennarod, Anjamkunnu, ManiyanKunnu

== Water spot ==
Chaniyamkadav river (Part of Kuttyadi river), Jammyampara pond, Padivattath pond, Sreesalapuram Pond, Chembrat pond

== Govt Institutions ==
Muyippoth primary Health Centre Muyippoth Govt veterinary Hospital Telephone exchange Muyippoth

== Library and reading room ==
Ezhuthum vayanayum Library Muyippoth, PR Nambiar memorial Library Muyippoth, Sathyan Smaraka Grandhalayam Nirappamkunnu Samskarika Nilayam padinjarekkara Samskarika Nilayam Edacherichalil

== Transportation ==
Muyipoth connects to other parts of India through Vadakara and Perambra town. The nearest airports are at Kannur and Kozhikode. The nearest railway station is at Vadakara.
