= Chorode =

- village
- Location in Kerala, India Chorode (India)
- Coordinates: 11.636560°N 75.582130°E
- Country: India
- State: Kerala
- District: Kozhikode

Population (2011)
  - Total: 38,245

Languages
  - Official: Malayalam, English
- Time zone: UTC+5:30 (IST)
- PIN: 673106
- Telephone code: 0496
- Vehicle registration: KL-
- Nearest city: Vatakara
- Literacy: 100%
- Lok Sabha constituency: Vatakara
- Vidhan Sabha constituency: Vatakara
- Climate: good (Köppen)

Chorode is a village in Kozhikode district in the state of Kerala, India.

== Demographics ==
As of 2011 India census, Chorode had a population of 38,245, with 17,918 males and 20,327 females. It is located nearly 3 km from Vatakara town in Kozhikode district and approximately 18 km from Thalassery town.

== Transportation ==
National Highway 17 (NH-17) passes through Chorode. There is an overbridge built for the road at its intersection with the railway track.
