= Parakkal Abdulla =

Indian politician

Member of the Kerala Legislative Assembly
- In office 2016–2021
- Preceded by: K. K. Lathika
- Succeeded by: K. P. Kunhammadkutty
- Constituency: Kuttiady

Personal details
- Party: Indian Union Muslim League

Parakkal Abdulla is an Indian politician and former MLA of Kuttiady. He was born on 15 November 1958 at Eramala to Moithu Haji and Kunhami. He was also the district committee treasurer of IUML. His wife is Jameela and has two sons and two daughters. He is a businessman and has lived in Doha, Qatar for more than 30 years as of 2016. He is the official candidate of UDF in Kuttiadi constituency for 2021 Assembly elections.
