= K. K. Lathika =

Indian politician

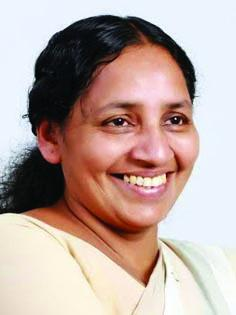
- K. K. Lathika

Member of Kerala Legislative Assembly
- In office 13 May 2011 – 19 May 2016
- Preceded by: constituency created
- Succeeded by: Parakkal Abdulla
- Constituency: Kuttiady

Personal details
- Born: 1 August 1961 (age 65) Kunnummel
- Party: Communist Party of India

Kunnummel Kunhichathu Lathika (born August 1, 1961) is an Indian politician and former MLA of Kuttiady. She is the daughter of Shri K.K. Kunhichathu and Smt. Sarojini and married P Mohanan, currently the district secretary of CPI(M) in Kozhikode. She has two sons, Julius Nikithas and Julius Mirshad. The marriage of her son Julius Nikithas to Sayomi received applause for the simplicity in its conduct.

K.K. Lathika started her political life through Students Federation of India. She was active in both Democratic Youth Federation of India and All India Democratic Women's Association (AIDWA). She was the president of Kunnummel Grama Panchayat from the period 1995- 2005 and during her tenure the Panchayat was selected for 'Best Grama Panchayat' Award in Kozhikode district. In 2011, she won in Kuttiady (State Assembly constituency) with a majority of 6,972 votes. She couldn't repeat her success in 2016 elections in the same constituency. In 2015, K.K. Lathika along with fellow legislators Jameela Prakasham, Geetha Gopi, E S Bijimol and K Suleekha filed a sexual assault complaint against Congress MLA Sivadasan Nair for his aggression inside the legislative assembly.
