= K. P. Kunhammadkutty =

Keralite politician in the Communist Party of India (Marxist)

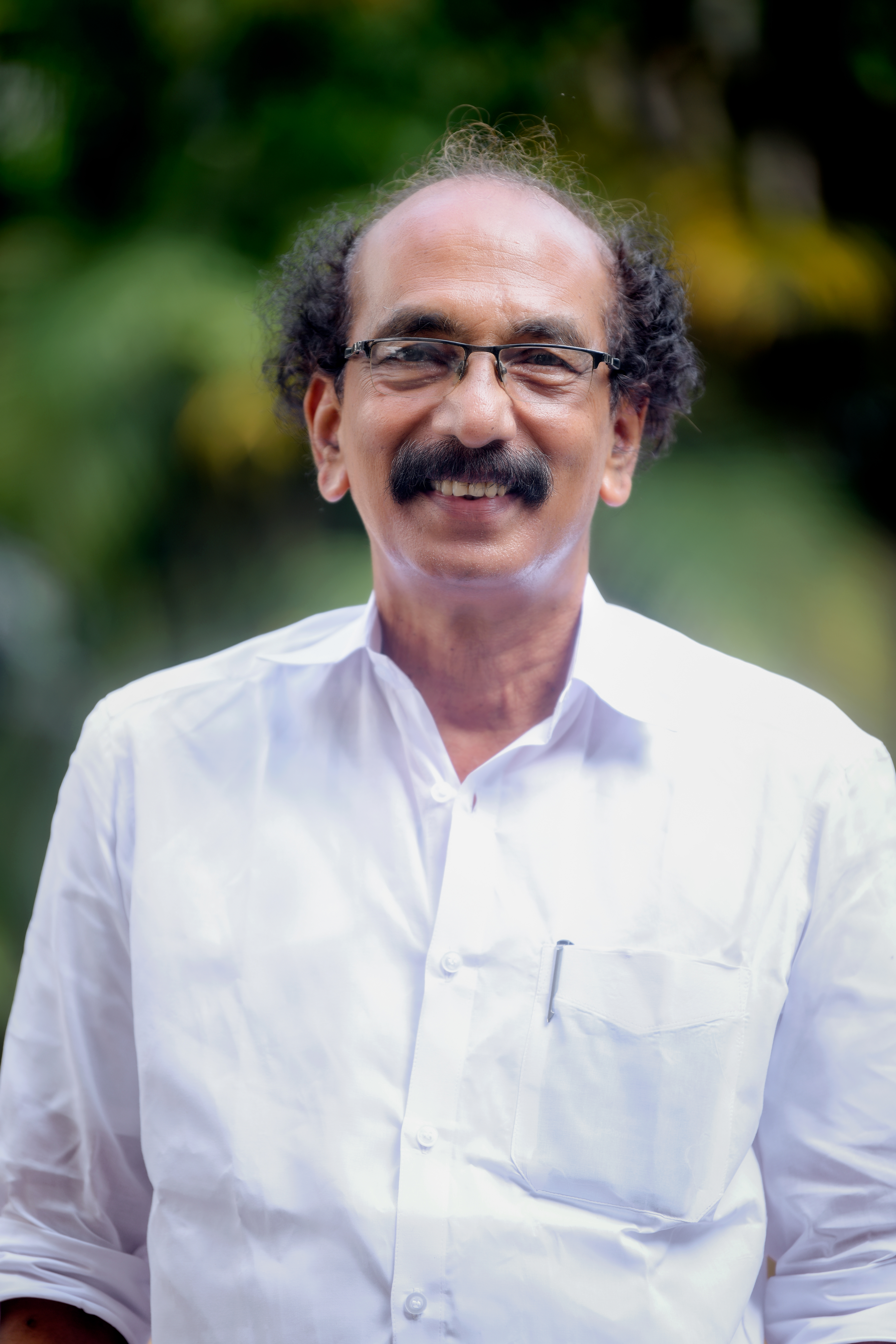

Personal details
- Born: 1952 (age 73–74)
- Party: CPI(M)
- Occupation: Politician
- Website: Official website

K. P. Kunhammadkutty (born 1952) is an Indian politician belonging to the Communist Party of India (Marxist), and a member of legislative assembly who represented Kuttiady, Kerala, India from 2021 to 2026.

== Personal life ==
He was born to Moidu and Maryiam in 1952. He studied in Kuttiyadi MI UP School, Vattoli National High School and SSMOTS Tirurangadi. He is a TTC degree holder (1969–71) and a former teacher at Kuttiyadi AIUP School.

== Positions held ==
- Kozhikkode District Panchayat president. (2005–-2010)
- Member, CPI(M) District Committee, Kozhikkode.
- Member, CPI(M) District Secretariat, Kozhikkode.
