= V. V. Dakshinamoorthi =

Indian politician

V. V. Dakshinamoorthi (20 May 1935 – 31 August 2016) was a senior Communist Party of India (Marxist) (CPI(M)) leader and member of the Kerala state secretariat.

== See also ==
- Politics of India
