= Meppayur =

- Census town
- Nicknames: Venkapparapoyil, Poyil
- Meppayur, Kerala, India Meppayur (India)
- Coordinates: 11°31′0″N 75°42′0″E
- Country: India
- State: Kerala
- District: Kozhikode

Government
  - Body: Grama Panchayat

Area
  - Total: 23.41 km^{2} (9.04 sq mi)

Population (2011)
  - Total: 13,922
  - Density: 594.7/km^{2} (1,540/sq mi)

Languages
  - Official: Malayalam, English
- Time zone: UTC+5:30 (IST)
- PIN: 673 524
- Vehicle registration: KL-77

Meppayur is a town in Kozhikode district of Kerala state, South India.

== Villages and Desoms ==
The region comprises two main villages: Meppayur and Kozhukkallur. Meppayur Grama Panchayath was formed in 1963. Notable places include Meppayur, Keezhpayur, Changaravelly, Kayalad, Narakkode, Nidumpoyil, Chavatta, Kozhukkallur, and Vilayattur.

== Demographics ==
According to the 2011 census of India, Meppayur Panchayath had a population of 6,491 males and 7,431 females, for a total of 13,922 people across 3,265 households.

== Politics ==
Meppayur is one of the noted cultural and political areas in Malabar. Earlier, its assembly constituency was part of Vatakara. Following constituency delimitation Meppayur Legislative Assembly (LAC), was renamed Kuttiady LAC. Mepapyur and Cheruvannur panchayaths were merged into the Perambra LAC.

== Location ==
Meppayur area is situated between Kottappuzha (Kuttiadippuzha) and Nelliadipuzha. Meppayur town is about 11 km away from NH 66 and 12 km away from Koyilandy Railway station.

== Transportation ==
Meppayur connects to the rest of Kerala via the nearby town of Koyilandy. The nearest airports are at Kannur and Kozhikode. The nearest railway station is in Koyilandy. The National Highway No.66 passes through Koyilandy and the northern stretch connects to Mangalore, Goa and Mumbai. The southern stretch connects to Cochin and Trivandrum. Additionally State Highway 54 passing through Kuttiady connects the region to Mananthavady, Mysore and Bangalore.
