= T. P. Ramakrishnan =

Indian politician

Comrade T. P. Ramakrishnan
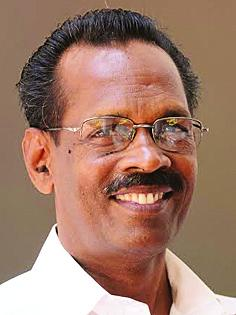

Minister for Excise & Labour, Government of Kerala
- In office 25 May 2016 – 3 May 2021
- Preceded by: Shibu Baby John
- Succeeded by: (Minister for Excise); V. Sivankutty (Minister for Labour)
- Constituency: Perambra

Personal details
- Born: 15 June 1950 (age 76) Kozhikode, Kerala, India
- Party: Communist Party of India (Marxist)
- Spouse: M. K. Nalini
- Children: Rajulal; Ranjini

T. P. Ramakrishnan is an Indian politician from the state of Kerala. He started his political work through Kerala Students Federation.Earlier he was the Minister of Excise and Labour in the first Pinarayi Vijayan ministry.

== Achievements as the Minister for Labour and Excise in Kerala ==
=== Awaz Health Insurance Scheme ===
Office Labour Ministry of Kerala under T.P. Ramakrishnan announced its Health Insurance Scheme to migrant workers in Kerala. Free treatment worth Rs. 15,000 and health insurance with accidental coverage will be provided for workers registering under this scheme titled Awaz Health Insurance Scheme in Kerala. The insurance scheme, which was to be renewed every year, was well received by the migrant worker community in Kerala. In 2015, the number of migrants in the state stood at 2.5 million. As per a study conducted by International Journal of Commerce, Business and Management in 2016, about 60% of these labourers work on construction sites and the rest in the hospitality, manufacturing, trade and agriculture sectors. A study by Kerala Institute of Labour and Employment in 2016, revealed that 87% of these migrant labourers did not have health insurance.

=== Vimukthi de-addiction mission ===
The CPI(M) led LDF government in Kerala announced Vimukthi mission which aims to create awareness among the youth against substance abuse. Former Indian cricketer Sachin Tendulkar inaugurated the mission activities on 8 November 2016.

== See also ==
- Kerala Council of Ministers
