= Maniyur =

Maniyur Grama Pnchayath
- Grama Panchayath
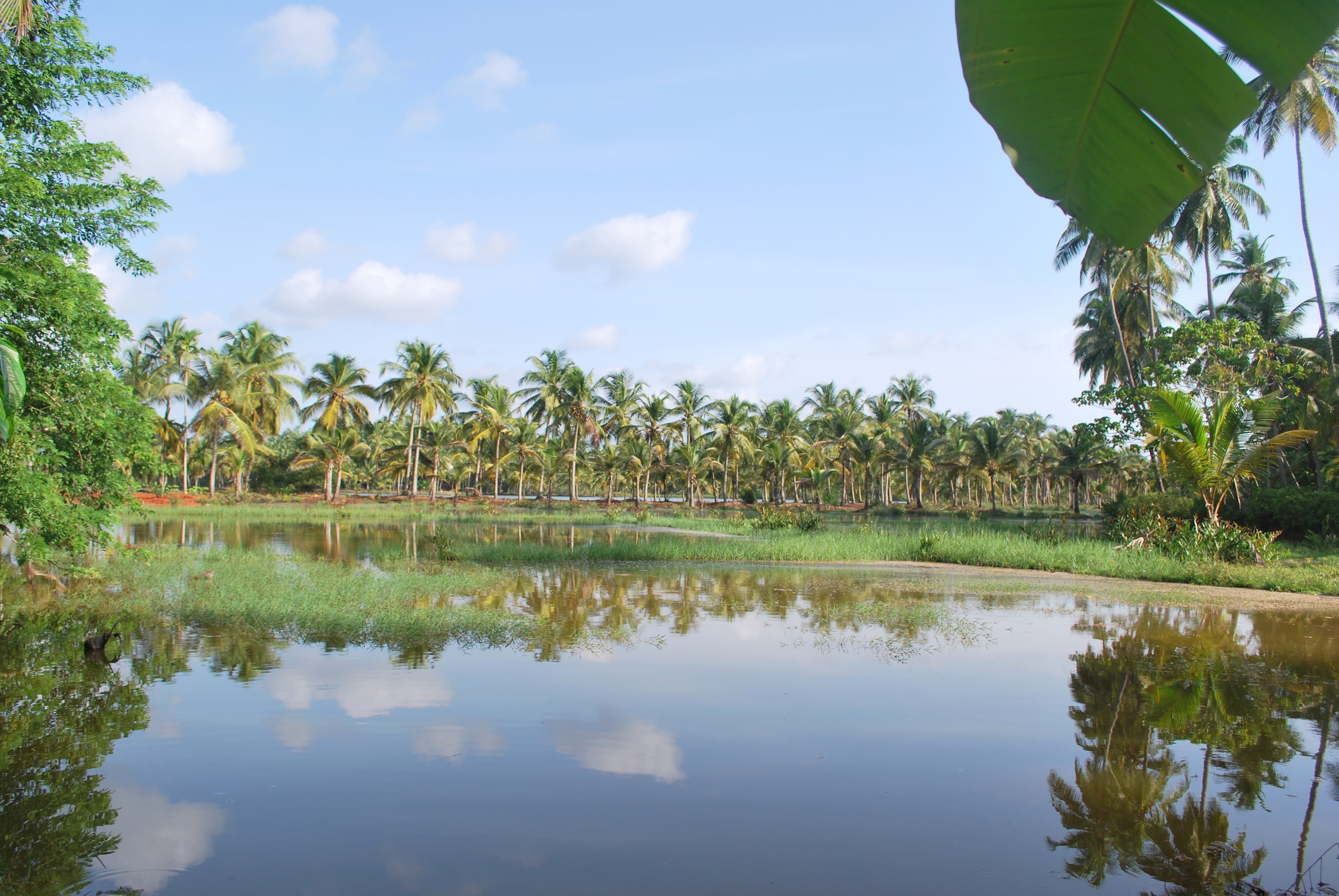
- Paddy Fields in Winter in Maniyoor

- Location in Kerala, India Maniyur Grama Pnchayath (India)
- Coordinates: 11°32′28″N 75°39′00″E
- Country: India
- State: Kerala
- District: Kozhikode

Population (2011)
  - Total: 21,820

Languages
  - Official: Malayalam, English
- Time zone: UTC+5:30 (IST)
- ISO 3166 code: IN-KL
- Vehicle registration: KL-18, KL-56
- Website: http://lsgkerala.in/maniyurpanchayat/

Maniyur Grama Panchayat is located in Vadakara Taluk, in the Kozhikode district in the state of Kerala, India. It covers an area of 31.03 km^{2}.

== General information ==
General Information
Name	Maniyur Grama Panchayath
Formation Year	1954
District	Kozhikode
Assembly constituency	Kuttiadi assembly constituency
Parliament Constituency	Vatakara
Block Panchayath	Thodannur
Elevation/Altitude	24 meters. Above Sea level
Total Area	31.03 km^{2}
No. of Wards	21
Total Population	21,820 Male=10,244 Female=11,576
Literacy	90.06%
Language	Malayalam and English, Hindi, Tami

== Demographics ==
As of the 2011 India census, Maniyur had a population of 21,820 with 10,244 males and 11,576 females.

== Borders ==
South -Thurayoor panchayath, Payyoli Municipality

North-Villyappally panchayath, Thiruvallur Panchayath, Vatakara Municipality

West-Payyoli Municipality, Vatakara Municipality

East-Thiruvallur Panchayath, Cheruvannur Panchayath, Thurayur Panchayath

== Transportation ==
Maniyur village connects to other parts of India through Vatakara city on the west and through Payyoli town on the south. National Highway No. 66 passes through Vatakara and the northern stretch connects to Mangalore, Goa and Mumbai. The southern stretch connects to Cochin and Trivandrum. The eastern Highway going through Kuttiady connects to Mananthavady, Mysore and Bangalore. The nearest airports are at Kannur and Kozhikode. The nearest railway station is at Vatakara.

== Presidents ==
No.	NAME	On Chair	
1	T M Dhamodharan Nambiar		
2	K T Kunjiraman Master		
3	Balan Thekkedath		
4	K Pushpaja		T P Gopalan Master
6	B Suresh Babu		
7	M Jayaprabha		
8	T.K Asharaf		
9	Dinsha K(2025–Present)		

Maniyur is one of the 36 grama panchayats in Kozhikode district in which women are the chairperson.

== Education ==
This panchayat has the legacy of starting a public educational institution long before the beginning of the twentieth century when the national movement was gaining its strength. There are many schools here which were established in the late 19th century. Mantharathoor UP School is the oldest school in the panchayat. This school is more than one hundred years old. Records show that this institution, the first primary school in the panchayat, had a liberal approach towards student's admission. The second primary school in Maniyur Panchayath, Palayad LP school was established in 1880. All other primary schools were established approximately 50–100 years ago. Maniyur Panchayat Secondary School was established in 1966.

There are many primary schools that were started during the tenure of the Malabar District Board. Most of the primary schools were upgraded during 1955–1959. This universalization of the schools helped the minority communities and the scheduled caste communities to get access to education. People across the society came forward to establish these schools, inculcating higher values. At a time when even untouchability existed, all sections of the community were allowed to attend school.

=== Maniyur Panchayath HSS ===
The only Higher Secondary School in Maniyur Panchayath is the Government HSS Maniyur. Its former name was Maniyoor Panchayath HSS and this was changed to the GHSS Maniyur when the Kerala government took control over this school which was under the control of the panchayat previously.

The school was started on 1 June 1996 and became a higher secondary school only after 2004. It follows the SCERT syllabus. This school has great achievements in both arts and sports and it even received national recognition. The school have classes from 8-12 with malayalam and english medium.

This school also belonged to the solar schools project of Kozhikode District panchayath which tried to make enough electricity for daily usage with solar power panels for energy.

=== Higher education institutions ===
==== IGNOU ====
Indira Gandhi National Open University promotes distance education. A center of Indira Gandhi National Open University is functioning in Maniyur Panchayath. The panchayat has allotted 2 acres of land for the construction of IGNOU building. Construction of this building was inaugurated in 2016.

==== MHES (Muslim Higher Education Society) ====
This educational institution is located in the 9th ward of the panchayat under Malabar Higher Education Society, a private institution. Undergraduate and Postgraduate courses in various disciplines and streams are available in this Institution.

==== Maniyur Engineering College / College of Engineering Vadakara (CEV) ====
The College of Engineering Vadakara (CEV) is an engineering college situated in Maniyur, in Kozhikode district of Kerala, established in 1999. The college is affiliated to APJ Abdul Kalam Technological University and approved by All India Council for Technical Education (AICTE).The first Engineering College under the Co-operative Academy of Professional Education (CAPE).

- The college is accredited by NAAC with 'B+' Grade.
- The college is an ISO 9001 – 2015 certified Institution.

Now in the covid situation some part of this is converted in to a covid first line treatment centre

== Agriculture ==
In the past, agriculture was Maniyur's main source of livelihood, with the area under cultivation stretching more than 2,000 acres. Later it was reduced to 300 acres. Cherandathoor Chira, the largest collection of paddy in the panchayat, is known as the paddy field of Vadakara. Under the leadership of B Sureshbabu, who took over the administration in 2010, efforts were made to reclaim the paddy and by 2016 the cultivation had expanded again to cover 900 acres.
