= Velom =

- village
- Velom Grama Panchayath
- Country: India
- State: Kerala
- District: Kozhikode

Area
  - Total: 25.8 km^{2} (10.0 sq mi)
  - Rank: NO 1

Population (2011)
  - Total: 26,738
  - Density: 1,040/km^{2} (2,680/sq mi)

Languages
  - Official: Malayalam, English
- Time zone: UTC+5:30 (IST)
- PIN: 673507
- Telephone code: 0496
- Vehicle registration: KL-77
- Nearest city: Vadakara
- Lok Sabha constituency: Vadakara

Velom Grama Panchayath is a village in Kozhikode district in the state of Kerala, India.

== Demographics ==
As of 2011 India census, the population of Velom village is 26738, 12761 of them are males and 13977 are females.

The population of children in Velom village aged 0-6 is 3220, that is 12.04 % of village's total population. Velom village's Average Sex Ratio is 1095 that is higher than Kerala state average of 1084. Velom village 's Child Sex Ratio according to census is 1005, higher than Kerala average of 964. The village is in the Assembly Constituency Kuttyady and Parliament constituency Vatakara.
