= Vatakara =

Vatakara Vadakara, Badagara
- Municipality
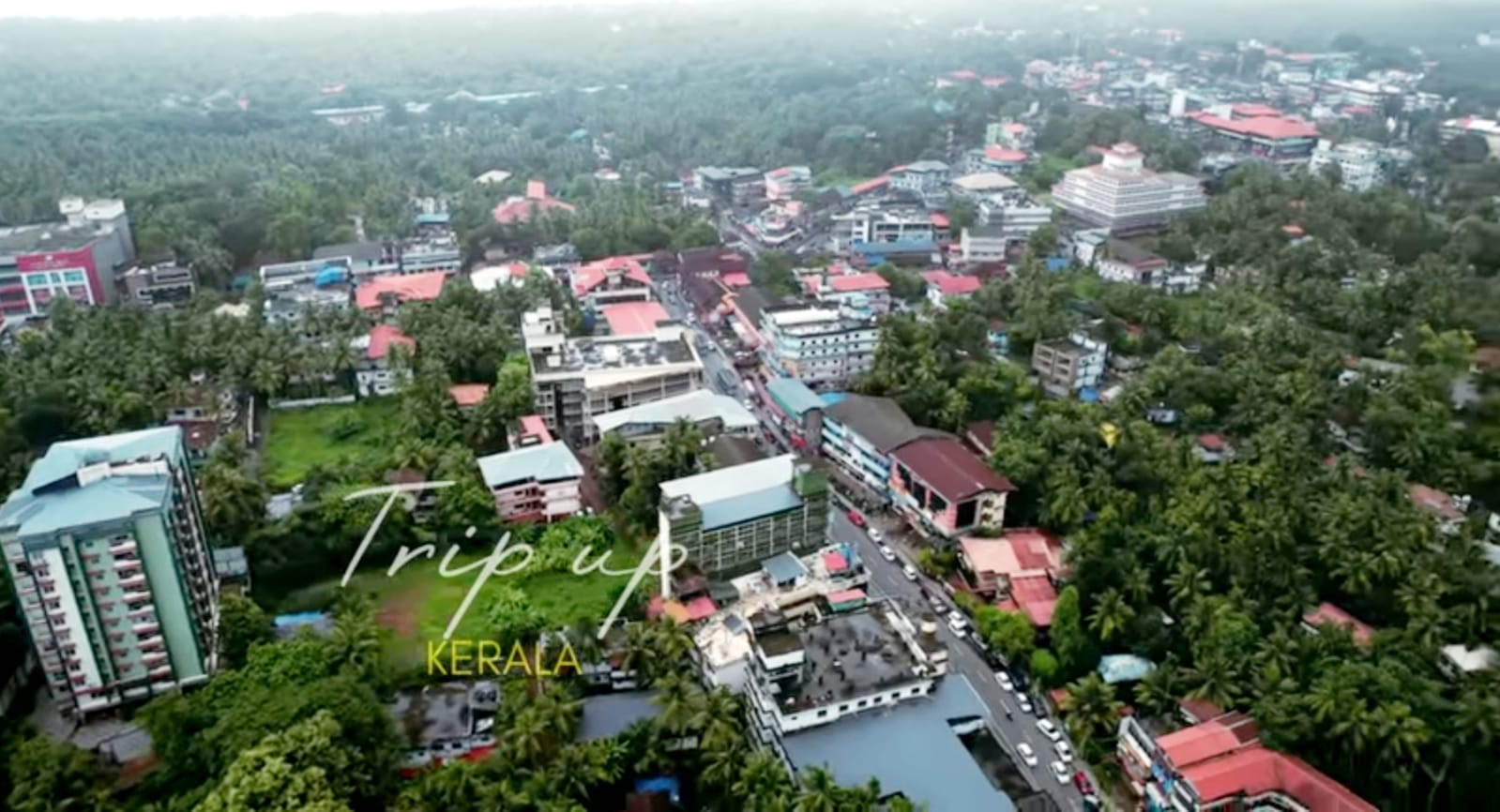
- Sky view of vadakara byepass area
- Nickname: Kadathanad Vadakkarakkar
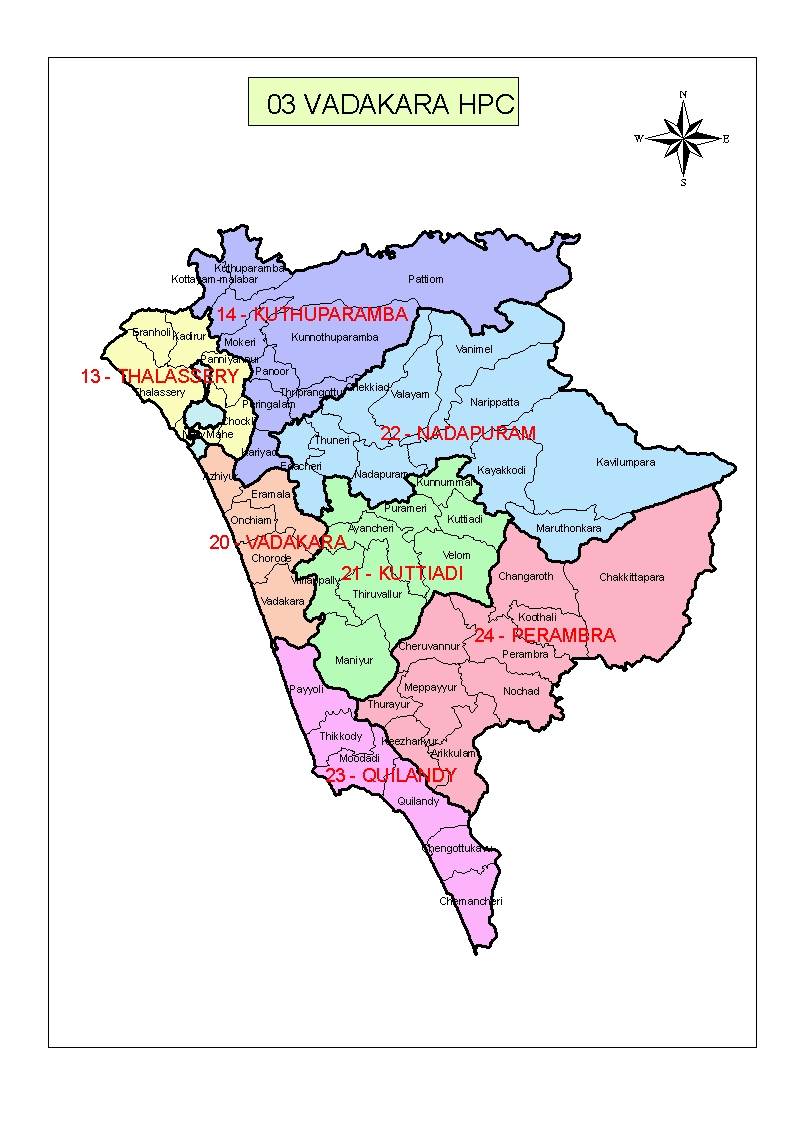

- Vatakara (India)
- Coordinates: 11°34′2″N 75°36′2″E
- Country: India
- State: Kerala
- District: Kozhikode

Government
  - Type: Municipality

Area
  - Total: 23.33 km^{2} (9.01 sq mi)

Population (2011)
  - Total: 75,295
  - Density: 3,227/km^{2} (8,359/sq mi)
- Demonym: Vadakarakkaran

Languages
  - Official: Malayalam, English
- Time zone: UTC+5:30 (IST)
- PIN: 673101
- Telephone code: 0496
- ISO 3166 code: IN-KL
- Vehicle registration: KL-18
- Lok Sabha constituency: Vadakara
- Demonym: Vadakarakkaran

Vatakara, also known as Vadakara (Malayalam: [ʋɐɖɐgɐɾɐ]) (formerly Badagara, French: Bargaret), is a municipality, taluk and a major town in the Kozhikode district in Indian state of Kerala. The municipality of Vatakara covers an area of 24.33 km^{2} (9.39 sq mi) and is bordered by Mahé to the north and Payyoli to the south. It is the headquarters of Vatakara taluk, which consists of 22 panchayats. During the reign of the Kolathiris and Zamorins, Vatakara was known as Kadathanadu. During the British Raj, it was part of the North Malabar region of Malabar District in the state of Madras. The historic Lokanarkavu temple, made famous by the Vadakkan Pattukal (ballads of North Malabar), is situated in Vatakara. A new tardigrade (water bear) species collected from Vadakara coast has been named after Kerala State; Stygarctus keralensis.

Vatakara State assembly constituency is one of the 140 state legislative assembly constituencies in Kerala state in southern India. It is also one of the seven state legislative assembly constituencies included in the Vatakara Lok Sabha constituency. As of the 2021 assembly election, the current MLA is K.K Rema of Revolutionary Marxist Party of India.

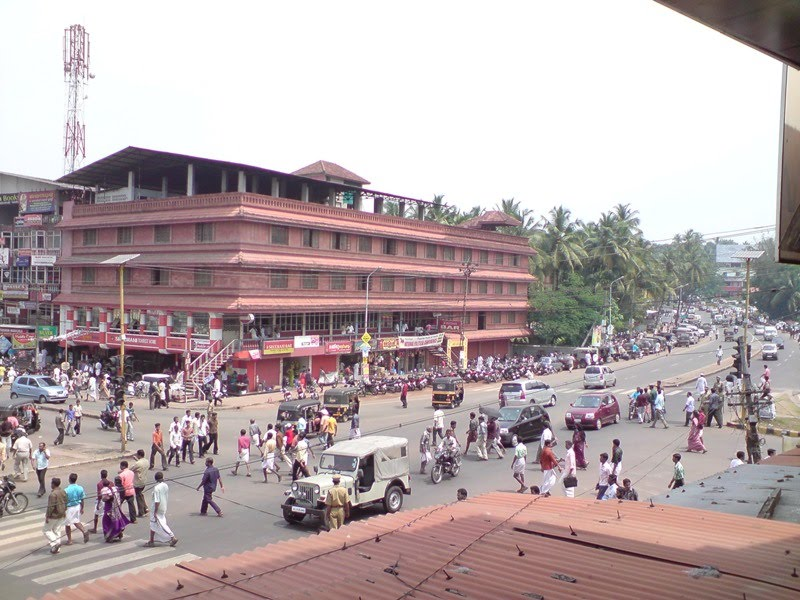

== Geography ==
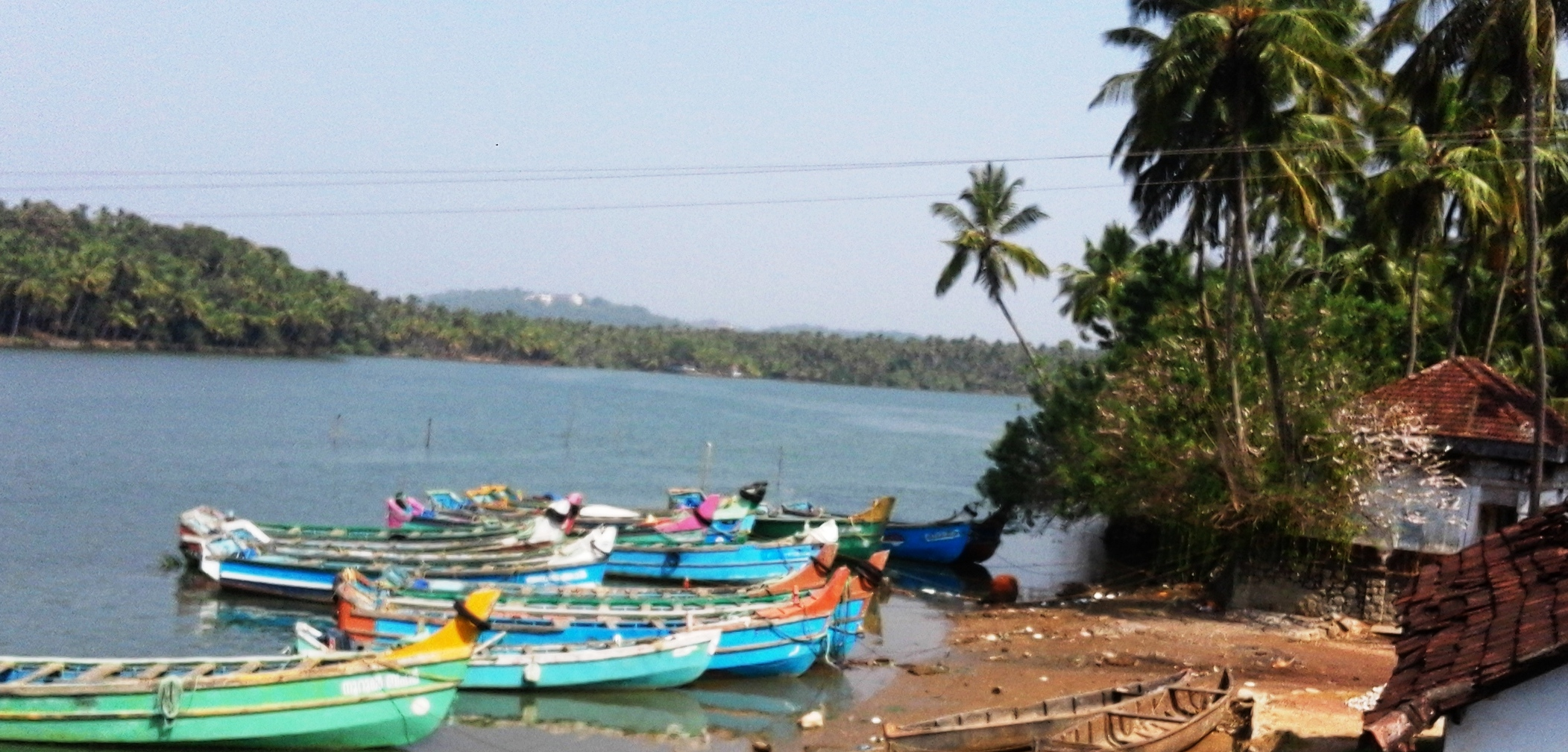
Jetty on the Moorad river

Vatakara is located at 11.60°N 75.58°E and has an average elevation of 15 m (49 ft). It is situated about 49 km to the north of Kozhikode City, approximately 44 km to the south of Kannur City, and adjacent to Mahé. The town lies by the side of a river variously called the Moorad river, the Kuttiady river, or Kottakkal river. The town's position relative to this river led to it being called Vadakkekara (north bank), later contracted to Vatakara. Towards the east, near the panchayats of Nadapuram and Kuttiady, Vadakara borders the Wayanad district along the Western Ghats section. In the west, like many of the towns in Kerala, Vatakara is flanked by the Arabian Sea. The Kuttiyadi river meets the sea to the south of Vatakara, forming small islands and sandbars near the river mouth.

== History ==
The Kolathunadu emerged into independent 10 principalities i.e., Kadathanadu (Vadakara), Randathara or Poyanad (Dharmadom), Kottayam (Thalassery), Nileshwaram, Iruvazhinadu (Panoor, Kurumbranad etc., under separate royal chieftains due to the outcome of internal dissensions. The Nileshwaram dynasty on the northernmost part of Kolathiri dominion, were relatives to both Kolathunadu as well as the Zamorin of Calicut, in the early medieval period of malabar.

Vatakara was the capital of the historical region called Kurumba Nadu, home of the Kurumbar people. In the pre-British era, a major part of the current Vatakara taluk, including the area currently constituting the Vatakara municipality, was ruled by a chieftain as a feudatory to the Kolathiri kingdom. The remaining part of the taluk was initially part of the Polathiri kingdom and later ruled by the Zamorins of Calicut. The boundary between these kingdoms is believed to have been in the region in Vatakara known as Puduppanam, with the Moorad river forming a geographical boundary. The Kadathanad dynasty was established when a Polathiri royal was forced to cross over to Kolathunadu after an unsuccessful battle with the Zamorins, settled in the region, and married a Kolathiri princess.

Vatakara became an important trade center in the region by the early 18th century, exporting agricultural products such as coffee, pepper and coconut. Together with smaller nearby ports at Chombal, Muttungal and Kottakkal, Badagara became one of the major centers of trade at a level with those at Cannanore, Tellicherri and Calicut. Building on a thriving economy led by a strong sea trade, the Kadathanad rulers established a strong naval force which became known as the "Lord of the Seas", since it was the strongest naval force from the Malayalam-speaking region.

A significant factor in the rise of Vatakara as a trade center was the rise and subsequent fall of the Kunjali Marakkars of Kottakkal. During the 16th century CE, Kunjali Marakkars were the admirals of the Zamorin's naval fleet and were famous for their valor and sea battle tactics. The Marakkars established their stronghold in Kottakkal and built a fort there. The last Marakkar, Kunjali IV, was defeated at the beginning of the 17th century by the combined forces of the Zamorin, with whom he had fallen out, and the Portuguese, who resented the interference of Kunjali and his followers in their trade route. The fort was completely destroyed by a bombardment from the sea. However, the Marakkars' knowledge of ship handling and tactics continued to be passed down in the community of seafarers in this area of Vatakara, later allowing the ruler of Kadathanad to establish his supremacy in the sea and to enforce a 'pass' system for trade ships.

The region became a separate kingdom c. 1750, when the then chieftain took the title of Kadathanad Rajah. During this period, there are records of frequent skirmishes between Kadathanad and the ruler of Kottayam as well as the foreign colonial powers of the British, based in Thalassery, and the French, based in Mahé.

In legend, Vatakara is the birthplace of Unniyarcha, Aromal Chekavar, and Thacholi Othenan, the heroes of the Vadakkanpattu (ballads of North Malabar). The Thacholi family home, Thacholi Tharavadu, is still preserved and the anniversary of Thacholi Othenan's birth is celebrated in the Thacholi Manikkothu Kavu temple.

Notable temples in the area include Lokanarkavu and Kottakkal Bhagavathi Temple, the second richest temple in North Malabar. Kalari Ullathil Temple is also situated near Vatakara town.The martial art Kalaripayattu originated in Vatakara.

== Demographics ==
Most of Vatakara's inhabitants are labourers and farmers, while some are government employees. A large number of expatriates from Vatakara work in Middle Eastern countries, and their remittances have a strong influence on the local economy. Some emigrants work in nearby states like Karnataka, Tamil Nadu and Maharashtra.

As of the 2011 Census of India, Vatakara had a population of 75,740, with males constituting 48% of the population and females 52%. Vatakara has an average literacy rate of 83%, higher than the national average of 59.5%; male literacy is 85%, and female literacy is 80%. 11% of the population was under 6 years old.

Social composition in Vadakara (2011)
Community	Percent
Hindu	64.75%
Islam	34.37%
Christianity	0.88%

== Economy ==
Fishing is one of Vatakara's main commercial activities. The Moorad River flows into the Arabian Sea at a point close to the town.

Vatakara is organized around two commercial hubs, the old and new bus depots. The area around the old bus depot contains commercial establishments as old as 100 years. Recently, commerce has shifted to the area around the new bus depot and the road towards Kannur, with many new buildings, including hospitals and flats being built or planned.

Nut Street is the distribution center for nuts, including coconuts and areca nuts. Produce flows to collection outlets and is dried, packed, and transported to other states. Northern Kerala is well known for the production of coconuts.

Hospitals include the CO-OP Hospital, Asha Hospital, Janatha Hospital, Ceeyam Hospital and the Parco specialty hospital.

The Uralungal Labour Contract Co-operative Society is a unique labour cooperative initiative centered in Madappally that was inspired by the Indian sage Vagbhatananda. The society was registered in 1925.

== Climate ==
Climate data for Vatakara, Kerala
Month	Jan	Feb	Mar	Apr	May	Jun	Jul	Aug	Sep	Oct	Nov	Dec	Year
Mean daily maximum °C (°F)	31.7 (89.1)	32.0 (89.6)	32.9 (91.2)	33.2 (91.8)	32.7 (90.9)	29.6 (85.3)	28.3 (82.9)	28.8 (83.8)	29.5 (85.1)	30.4 (86.7)	31.1 (88.0)	31.5 (88.7)	31.0 (87.8)
Mean daily minimum °C (°F)	21.9 (71.4)	23.0 (73.4)	24.6 (76.3)	25.8 (78.4)	25.7 (78.3)	23.9 (75.0)	23.4 (74.1)	23.6 (74.5)	23.7 (74.7)	23.8 (74.8)	23.3 (73.9)	22.1 (71.8)	23.7 (74.7)
Average precipitation mm (inches)	2 (0.1)	4 (0.2)	15 (0.6)	78 (3.1)	292 (11.5)	905 (35.6)	1,031 (40.6)	520 (20.5)	282 (11.1)	248 (9.8)	108 (4.3)	23 (0.9)	3,508 (138.3)
Source: Climate-Data.org

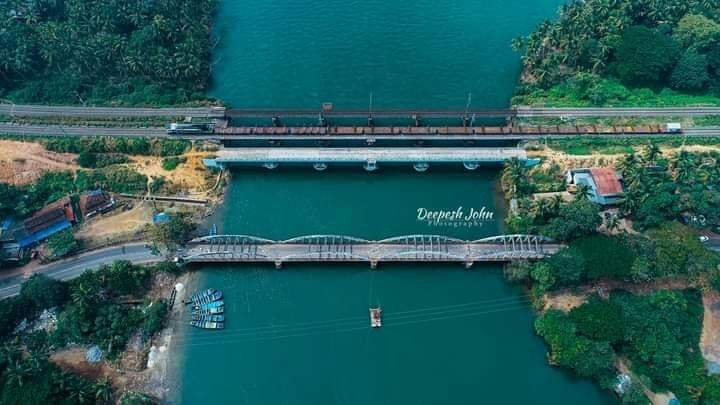
Gateway of Vadakara

== Transportation ==
- Train: Vatakara Railway Station is one of India's model railway stations, and connected to all major metros
- Air: Kannur International Airport is the closest airport, approximately 45 km away. Calicut International Airport is approximately 71 km away.
- Road: National Highway 66 (NH66) passes through Vatakara town, connecting Vatakara to Kozhikode to the south (45 km) and to Kannur (44 km) and Mangalore (188 km) to the north. A preliminary survey is being performed for a National Highway to connect Vatakara to Bangalore through Nadapuram.
- Vadakara distance between Vadakara to Mananthavady by bus is approximately 65 km. Bus travelling is one of the ways to reach from Vadakara to Mananthavady Wayanad
- Perambra via Thamarassery 55 km and 83 km from *Vadakara to *Kalpetta

== Notable places ==
=== Temples ===
Lokanarkavu temple

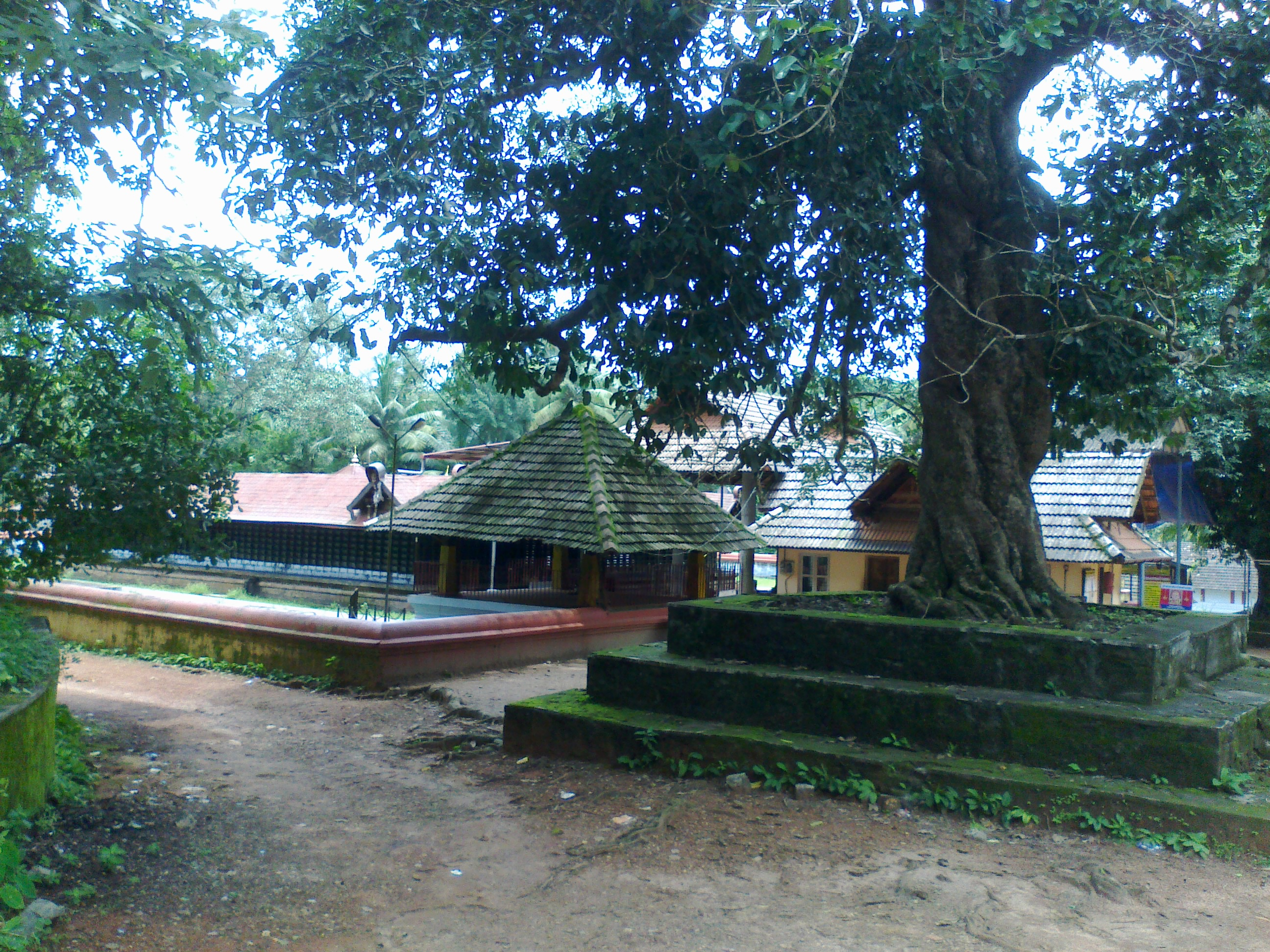
Bhagavathy Temple, Lokanarkavu

The Lokanarkavu temple is located at Memunda, 5 km from Vadakara. It is closely associated with the heroes and heroines of Vadakkanpattu: Thacholi Othenan, the hero of Kadathanadu, was a devotee of the Lokanarkavu goddess, Lokanarkavilamma, an aspect of Durga. Three rock-cut caves near the temple are decorated with candid murals and carvings. The annual Hindu festival celebrating Durga, locally called Pooram, takes place during March/April. Two temples adjacent to the Lokanarkavu temple focus on the worship of Vishnu and Shiva.

Payamkuttimala temple
The temple of Muthappan at Memunda is managed by the tourism department of the Kerala Government. As of 2018, plans were under way for modernization of the surroundings of the temple. The Theyyam form of worship is practiced here.
Chendamangalam temple
The Chennamangalam temple is one of the oldest temples in Kerala, and also one of the very few temples which has Dhwaja Pratishtha. It is situated 2 km from Vatakara town, near to Chorode. The deities primarily worshipped are Shiva and Ayyappan. This temple is similar in nature to the Sabarimala temple. When pilgrimages to Sabarimala were impossible due to a fire, Chennamangalam temple served as an alternative destination.
Kozhukkannur Neyyamruth Madom
Kozhukkannur Neyyamruth Madom is located at Purameri. In the Kottiyoor festival, the madom forms a centre from which Neyamruthu (ghee) offerings are taken to the Kottiyoor temple on foot.

Additional temples in the region include Kizhakkedathu temple, Sivapuram Sree Mahadeva Kshethram, Arathil Bhagavathi Kottakkal temple, Thuneri Sree Vettakkorumakan Kshethram, Ponmeri Shiva temple, Kalleri Kuttichathan temple, Kaliyampalli temple and Nagath Sri Muchilottu Bhagavathi temple.

Thacholi Othenan

Thacholi Meppayil Kunjhu Othenan or Mepayil Tacholi Manikoth Kovilakathu Kunji Othena Kurup (Udayana Kurup of Thacholi Manikoth House) or more popularly Thacholi Othenan was a legendary hero who is believed to have lived during 16th century in North Malabar region of Kerala, India. He is praised in the Vadakkan Pattukal (ballads of North Malabar).[6] [7] Thacholi Ambadi, another renowned martial arts expert, was Othenan's son.

== Kunjali Marakkar memorial ==
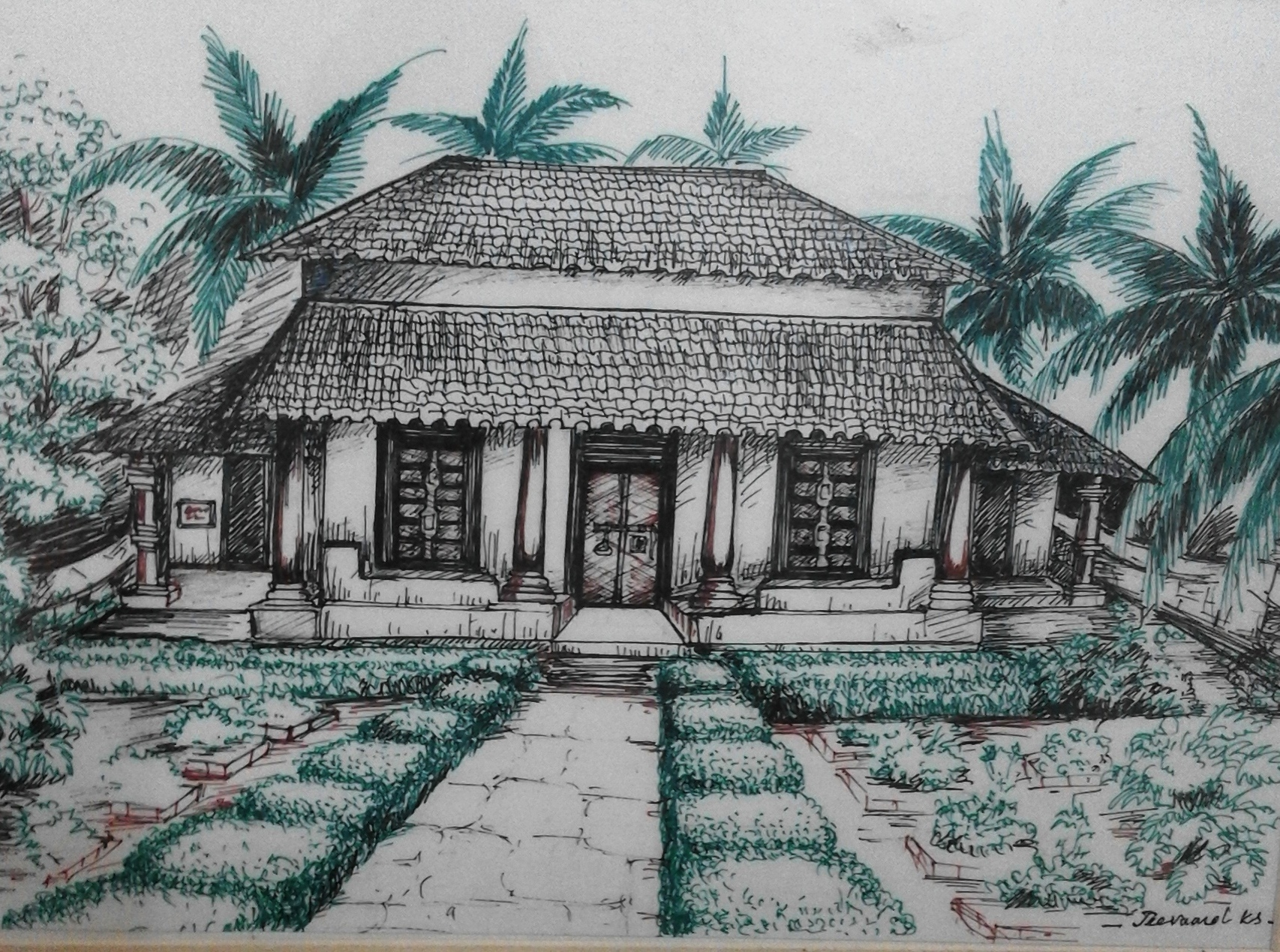
Kunjali Marakkar memorial

The location of the Marakkar fort on the southern bank of the Moorad river, 44 km from Kozhikode and 51 Km from Kannur, is now known as Kottakkal. A building in Kottakkal that belonged to Kunjali Marakkar serves as a small museum, with collections of ancient swords, cannonballs and knives.The Kunjali Marakkar or Kunhali Marakkar was the title given to the Muslim naval chief of the Inscriptions on the Kunjali Marakkar Memorial at Kottakkal, Vatakara.

=== Sandbanks recreation area ===
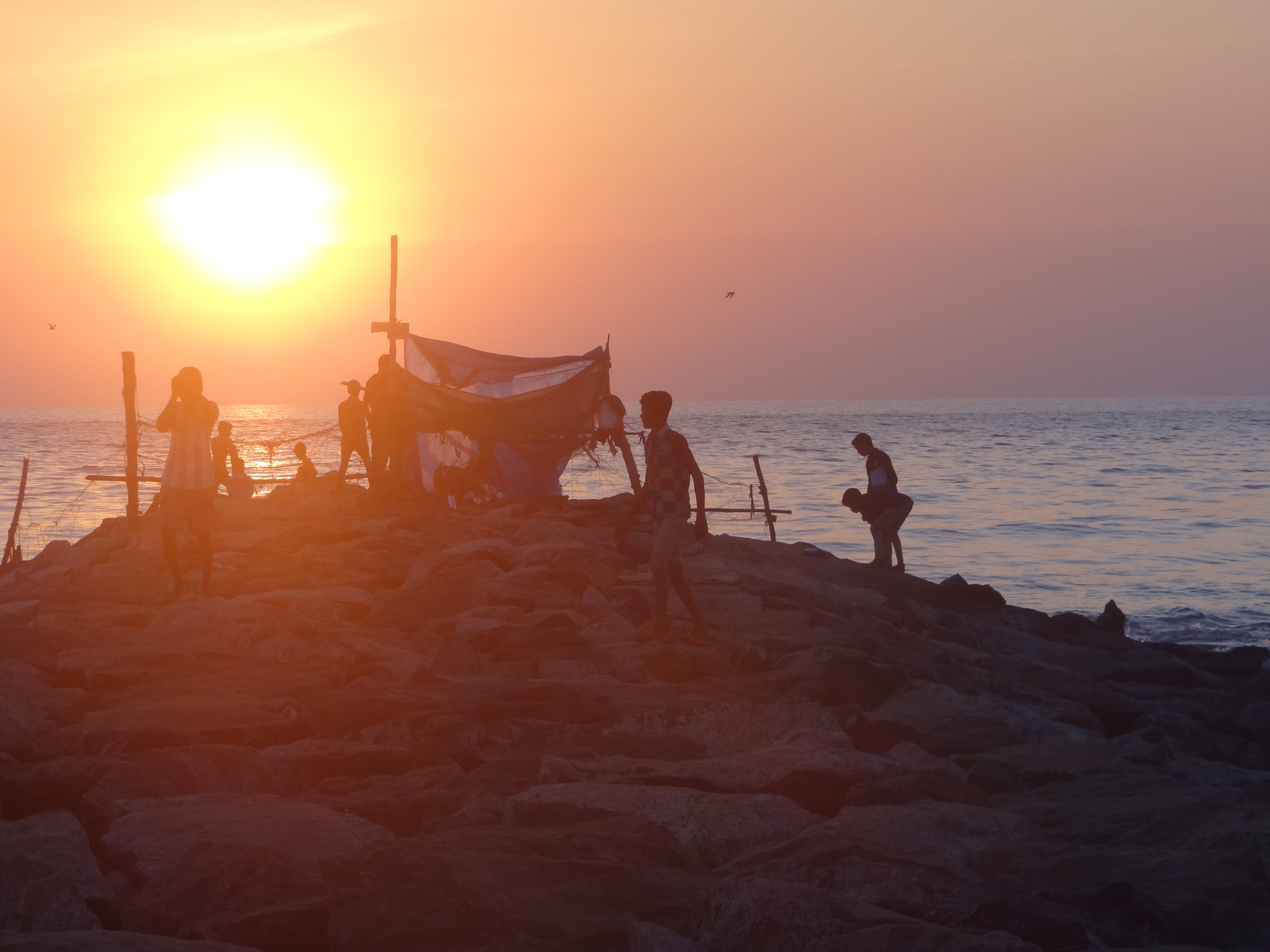
Vadakara Sandbanks

The Sandbanks recreation area is located on a small peninsula with the Moorad river on the east and the Arabian Sea on the west, approximately 3 km towards the south of Vatakara town. The Sandbanks Bungalow, which was built by Wilfred Vincent Reilly in 1946, stands on this peninsula. The area is owned by the Aditya Birla Management Corporation Ltd and managed by Vadakara Municipality. A coastal police station is being built on the peninsula.

== Theyyam ==
Theyyam or Thirayattam is a ritual performance art form that depict the cultural heritage of North Malabar, especially of ancient Kolathunad. Theyyam depicts Shiva bhutaganas, Kali and other deities and cultural heroes. The drama is enacted based on ancient stories and the language used is "Tottam pattu", a primitive form of Malayalam. Theyyam shows the Buddhist influence from centuries ago. Theyyam is usually held from October to May every year. The colour of Theyyam is typically red. Velan is described in the Sangam literature 500 CE. It could have been a tribal ritual art which evolved under Buddhism and the Brahminic revival of Hinduism. This art form is addressed as "Kaliyattom" North of Pazhayangadi Puzha, Kannur, as "Theyyam" South of the river and as "Tirayattom" around Vadakara (Kadathanadu).

== Villages in Vatakara Taluk ==
Villages in Vatakara Taluk

The position of the Vatakara Taluk in Kozhikode district is given below:

The villages included in the Taluk are:

- Ayancheri
- Azhiyur
- Chekkiad
- Chorode
- Edachery
- Edathumkara
- Eramala
- Kavilumpara
- Kayakkodi
- Kottappally
- Kunnummal
- Kuttiady
- Maniyur
- Maruthonkara
- Nadakkuthazha
- Nadapuram
- Narippatta
- Onchiam
- Palayad
- Purameri
- Thinur
- Thiruvallur
- Thuneri
- Valayam
- Vanimal
- Velom
- Vilangad
- Villiappally

== Educational institutions ==
There are many schools, colleges and tuition centers in Vatakara.

Amrita Vidyalayam, Arakkilad, Amrutha Public School, Pathiyarakkara, Vidya Prakash Public School, Rani Public School, Chorode and Gokulam Public School are the 5 main private schools in Vadakara.

1.Government College, Madappally Vadakara is a post-graduate campus affiliated with the University of Calicut.

2. The 62nd Regional Centre of the Indira Gandhi National Open University, Vadakara was established at Vatakara in January 2011, serving students from the Malabar region, including the Kasargod, Kannur, Wayanad, Kozhikode, and Malappuram districts.

3. College of Engineering Vatakara

College of Engineering Vadakara is an engineering college in Kozhikode district of Kerala, established in 1999. The first engineering college under the Co-operative Academy of Professional Education, Thiruvananthapuram, established by Govt. of Kerala, started functioning in June 1999.

4. Model Polytechnic College

Model Polytechnic College, Vadakara is running under the Institute of Human Resources Development established by Government of Kerala.

5. Government Technical High School was established in 1965 and it is managed by the Department of Education Kerala.

6. Busthaniya Women's College

== Notable residents ==
- Parakkal Abdulla
- P. K. Basheer
- T. P. Chandrasekharan
- Meenakshi Amma Gurukkal
- Kuniyil Kailashnathan
- Akbar Kakkattil
- Shabeer Kallarakkal
- Punathil Kunjabdulla
- K. K. N. Kurup
- V. T. Murali
- Cherusseri Namboothiri
- C. K. Nanu
- Mullappally Ramachandran
- K. K. Rema
- V. R. Sudheesh
- Unniyarcha
- Chembai
- Vadakkan Pattukal
- Chandu Chekavar
- Aromal Chekavar
- Kunjali Marakkar

== Tourism ==
Sargaalaya Crafts Village at Iringal, Vadakara sells traditional local art and crafts.

Local beaches include Sandbanks and Kolavipalam Beach at Kolavipalam between Vatakara and Payyoli, to the south of the Murad River. Sandbanks Beach features the Sandbanks Beach Park operated by KTDC.

Kunjali Marakkar Museum is located at about 1.5 km from the Sargaalaya Craft Village, at Kottakkal, Iringal (working hours: 9 A.M. to 5 P.M. and Monday is a holiday). It is the old residence of a legendary warrior, who fought valiantly against the Portuguese invaders. Marakkars are believed to be originally Moplas of Malabar, probably differing in exact origin and sub sect and have been traders by profession. The title of Marakkar possibly also derived from the ‘Malayala’ word, marak-kalam, meaning boat [Sea traders]. We can learn from history that the Muslim Naval Chief of the Zamorin (Samoothiri) Kingdom of Calicut (Kozhikode), namely the Kutti Mohammed Ali was bestowed the title of Kunjali in 1507. He was later succeeded by Kutti Pokker Ali (Kunhali II) and then, by the famed supporter of Kunhali II, namely Patu Marakkar (Kunhali III) and subsequently, the nephew of Kunhali III, by name Mohammed Marakar became Kunhali IV. These four Kunhali Marakkars have played such a prominent role in the Zamorin's naval wars with the Portuguese from 1502 to 1600 that they are accredited with the honour of organizing the first naval defense of the Indian coast.

Prominent displays include the model of the forted village of Kottakkal [Kotta (fort)] constructed by Kunjali Marakkar III, the arms such as the sword used by Kunjali Marakkar, cannonballs and many other war relics of the country's earliest naval heroes, who led the first successful defense of India's coast against the European sea power.

A panoramic view of Vadakara and its surroundings is what Payamkuttimala in Kozhikode district has to offer. Located from Panikkotti on Vadakara – Tiruvallur road, lots of travellers come to the hill station to watch the sunrise and sunset and gaze at the Arabian Sea. Set about 2,000 feet above sea level, the small hillock also houses a Muthappan Madapura and dead laterite rocks.

Lokanarkavu Temple is an ancient Hindu temple situated in Memunda 4 km from Vatakara, in Kozhikode District, North Malabar region of Kerala state of south India. Lokanarkavu is a short form of Lokamalayarkavu which means lokam (world) made of mala (mountain), aaru (river) and kavu (grove). The closest railway station is at Vatakara, which is 5 km from temple. The nearest airport is Kannur airport which is 54 km away.

Pooram is the important festival here and it is conducted with great pomp and show. The week-long festival begins with Kodiyettam (flag hoisting) and concludes with Arattu. The temple dedicated to goddess Durga has great historical importance as Thacholi Othenan, the legendary martial hero of Kerala, used to worship here every day.

== Lokanarkavu and Kalarippayattu ==
Thirty days Mandala Utsavam in Malayalam month Vrischikam (November–December) and Pooram in Malayalam month meenam (March–April) are the annual festival at the Lokanarkavu Bhagavathy Temple. This is the only temple where a peculiar folk dance called Poorakkali is presented during festivals. The dance, resembles the martial art Kalarippayattu. Even today, all Kalaripayattu artists seek the blessings of the deity before their debut due to the association of Lokanarkavu Temple with legendary hero thacholi othenan.

Kakkayam is a dam site located at Koorachundu in, Kerala. Kakkayam is on the outskirts of the Western Ghats, and Malabar Wildlife Sanctuary, a 7,421-hectare (18,340-acre) abode of wild animals including elephants and bisons. Kakkayam has an abundant wildlife population and is also a trekking and rock climbing destination.

This reservoir is part of the Kuttiyadi Hydro Electric Project and is located at about 750 m (2,460 ft) above sea level. The pen stock runs down from the dam site and goes through various tunnels and hills to the Kuttiyadi Main power house at Kakkayam with an installed capacity of 225MW. Water coming out of this power house is diverted to two small hydro electric projects namely Kuttiyadi Tail Race power house and Kakkayam small hydro electric project with an installed capacity of 3.75 MW and 3 MW respectively.After this the tail water joins the river and is utilized for Peruvannamoozhi Irrigation Project.

Kalleri Kuttichathan Temple is located at Kalleri village in Vatakara taluk, north to Kozhikode. Kalleri is located at Vatakara Thanneerpanthal route 8 km from Vatakara, near Villiappaly. There is a canal at Kalleri, which is a part of Vadakara – Mahi canal. Land of Kalleri is encircled by Kallerikunnu at west and Aroora mala (mountain) at east. Kottathuruthi Bhagavathi Temple is one of the beautiful temples in Kerala situated near the Arabian Sea. This temple is located in a small island called Kottathuruthi. It is an island village situated in the Kuttyadi river near Moorad bridge.

== See also ==
- lokanarkavu temple
- Unniyarcha
