= Attore South =

Attore South Attore Road
- Neighbourhood
- (India) Flag
- Location of Attore South in Kerala, India Attore South (India)
- Coordinates: 10°33′59″N 76°12′02″E
- Country: India
- State: Kerala
- District: Thrissur
- Taluk: Thrissur
- Block: Puzhakkal Block Panchayat
- Established: 1951
- Lok Sabha Constituency: Alathur (Constituency #9)
- നിയമസഭ (Niyamasabha) (or Vidhan Sabha or Legislative Assembly) Constituency: Wadakkanchery (Constituency #65)

Government
  - Type: Grama Panchayat
  - Body: Kolazhy Grama Panchayat

Area
  - Total: 4.64 km^{2} (1.79 sq mi)
- Elevation: 14 m (46 ft)

Population (2011)Pottore Census Town
  - Total: 7,848
  - Density: 1,690/km^{2} (4,380/sq mi)
- Demonym: Attokkaran

Languages
  - Official: Malayalam, English
- Time zone: UTC+5:30 (IST)
- Postal Index Number (PIN): 680013 - Kuttur (Thrissur) PO
- Telephone code: +91-487
- Vehicle registration: KL-08
- Climate: Tropical monsoon (Köppen Am)
- Website: http://lsgkerala.in/kolazhypanchayat/

Attore South (English: /ɑːˈtɔːr/, also known as Attore Road, is part of Kolazhy grama panchayat, in Puzhakkal block, in Thrissur taluk, in Thrissur district. It is located 5 kilometres (3.1 mi) north of Thrissur city.

Attore South is also known by the name "Attore Road", because the road to Attore North passes by here.

Attore South is included in Pottore Census Town and served by Kuttur (Thrissur) post office, PIN 680013.

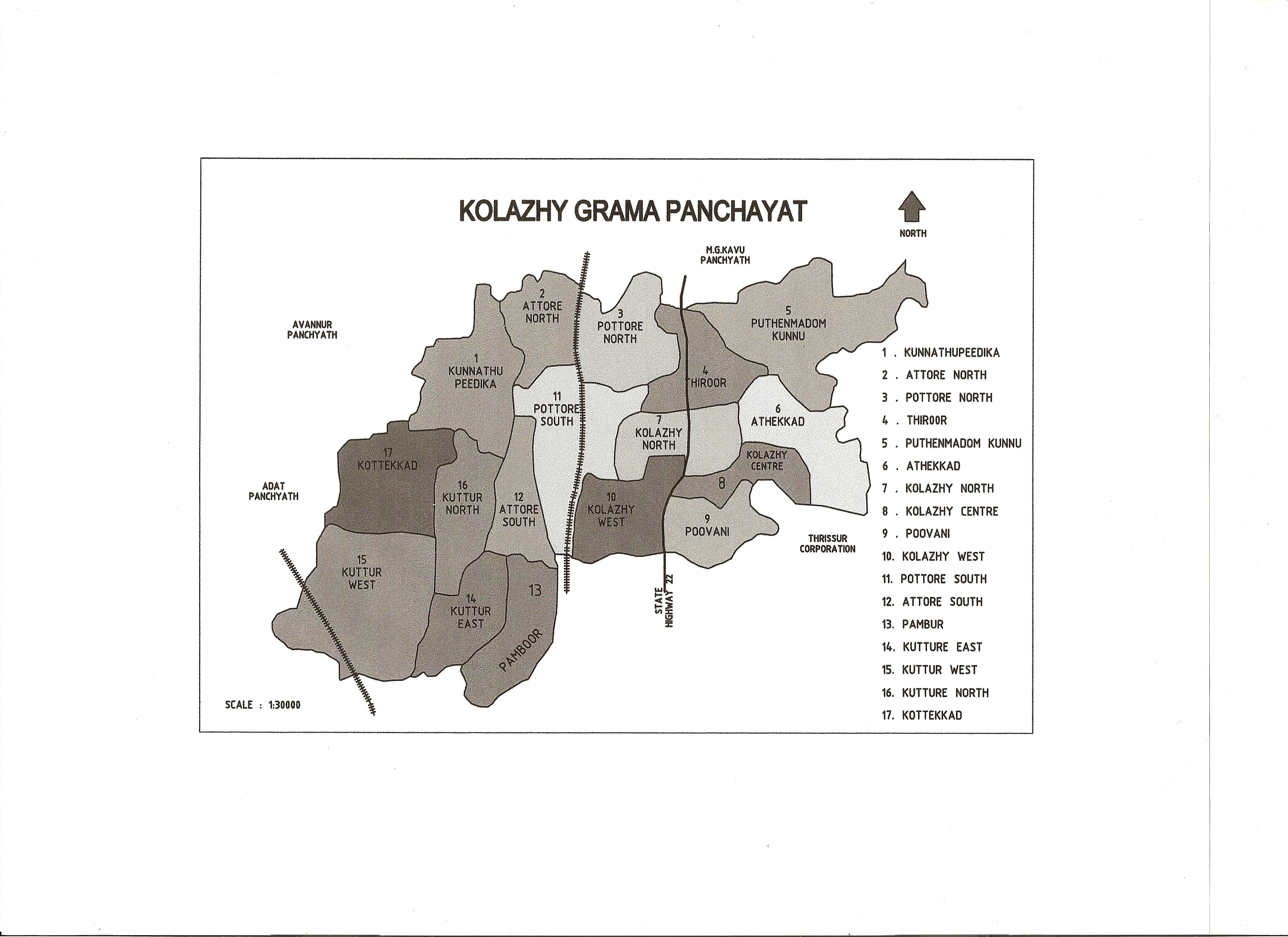
Kolazhy Grama Panchayath Wards

== History ==
Present day Attore South, in ancient times, was just a road, that connected Attore angadi (Attore village) to Thrissur city. It was then part of Vijayapuram "pravrithi" in Trichur "taluq".

Oldest reference to the name "Attore" can be found in the 1788 publication "Memoir of a map of Hindoostan" by James Rennell.
