= Attore North =

Attore North Attore Angadi
- Neighbourhood
- (India) Flag
- Location of Attore North in Kerala, India Attore North (India)
- Coordinates: 10°34′36″N 76°12′00″E
- Country: India
- State: Kerala
- District: Thrissur
- Taluk: Thrissur
- Block: Puzhakkal Block Panchayat
- Established: 1951
- Lok Sabha Constituency: Alathur (Constituency #9)
- നിയമസഭ (Niyamasabha) (or Vidhan Sabha or Legislative Assembly) Constituency: Wadakkanchery (Constituency #65)

Government
  - Type: Grama Panchayat
  - Body: Kolazhy Grama Panchayat

Area
  - Total: 4.64 km^{2} (1.79 sq mi)
- Elevation: 14 m (46 ft)

Population (2011)Pottore Census Town
  - Total: 7,848
  - Density: 1,690/km^{2} (4,380/sq mi)
- Demonym: Attokkaran

Languages
  - Official: Malayalam, English
- Time zone: UTC+5:30 (IST)
- Postal Index Number (PIN): 680581 - Pottore (Mulagunnathukavu) PO
- Telephone code: +91-487
- Vehicle registration: KL-08
- Climate: Tropical monsoon (Köppen Am)
- Website: http://lsgkerala.in/kolazhypanchayat/

Attore North, also known as Attore Angadi, or just Attore, is part of Kolazhy grama panchayat, in Puzhakkal block, in Thrissur taluk, in Thrissur district. It is located 6.5 kilometres (4.0 mi) north of Thrissur city.

Attore North is where the settlement originated and constituted the main village, hence the name, "Attore angadi" (meaning "Attore village").

Attore North is included in Pottore Census Town and served by Pottore (Mulagunnathukavu) post office, PIN 680581.

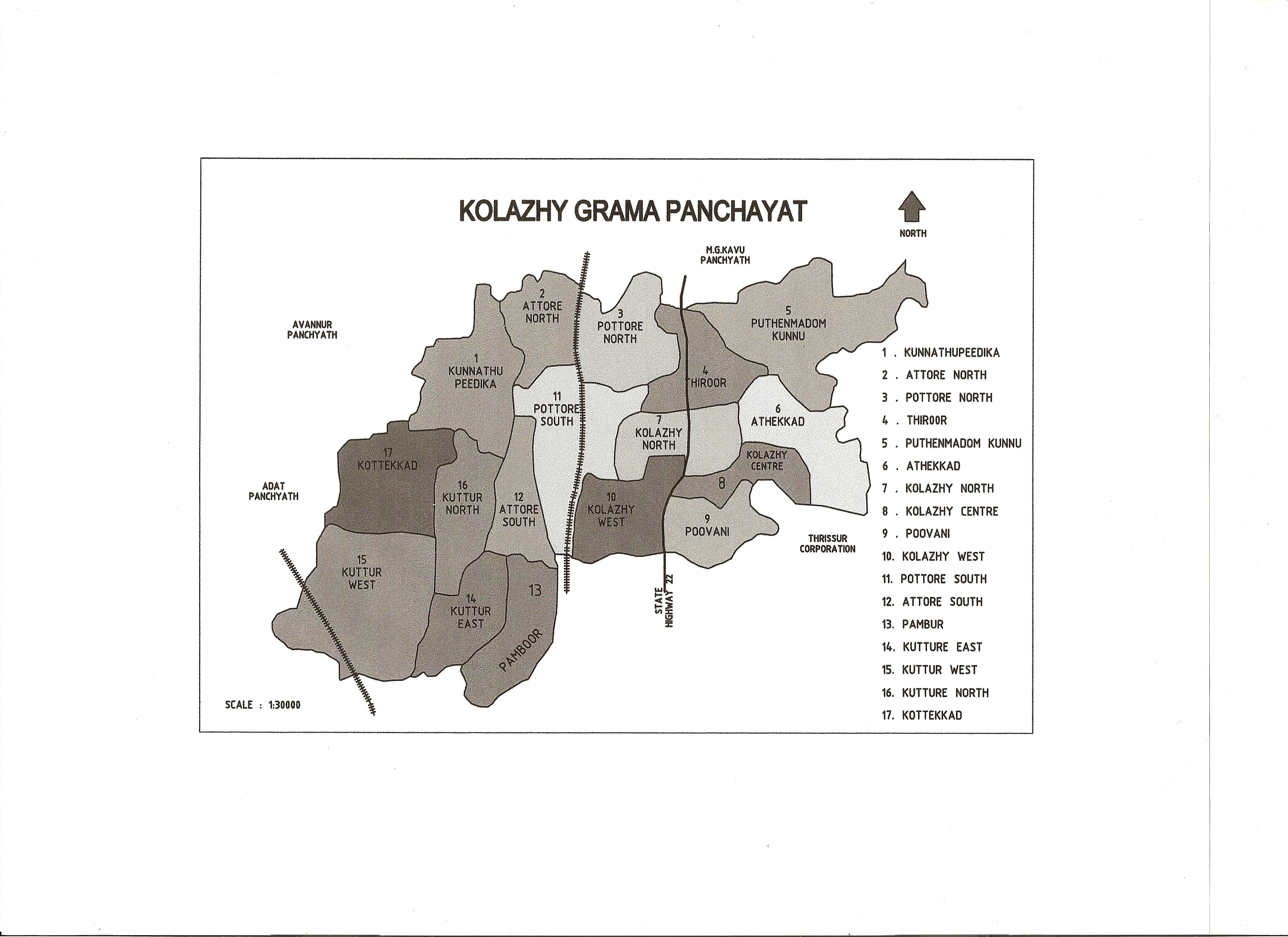
Kolazhy Grama Panchayath Wards

== History ==
Present day Attore North, in ancient times, was then part of Vijayapuram "pravrithi" in Trichur "taluq" and known as Attore "desam".

Oldest reference to the name "Attore" can be found in the 1788 publication "Memoir of a map of Hindoostan" by James Rennell.
