= Kolazhy Gram Panchayat =

Kolazhy Grama Panchayat Kolazhy GP
- Grama Panchayat
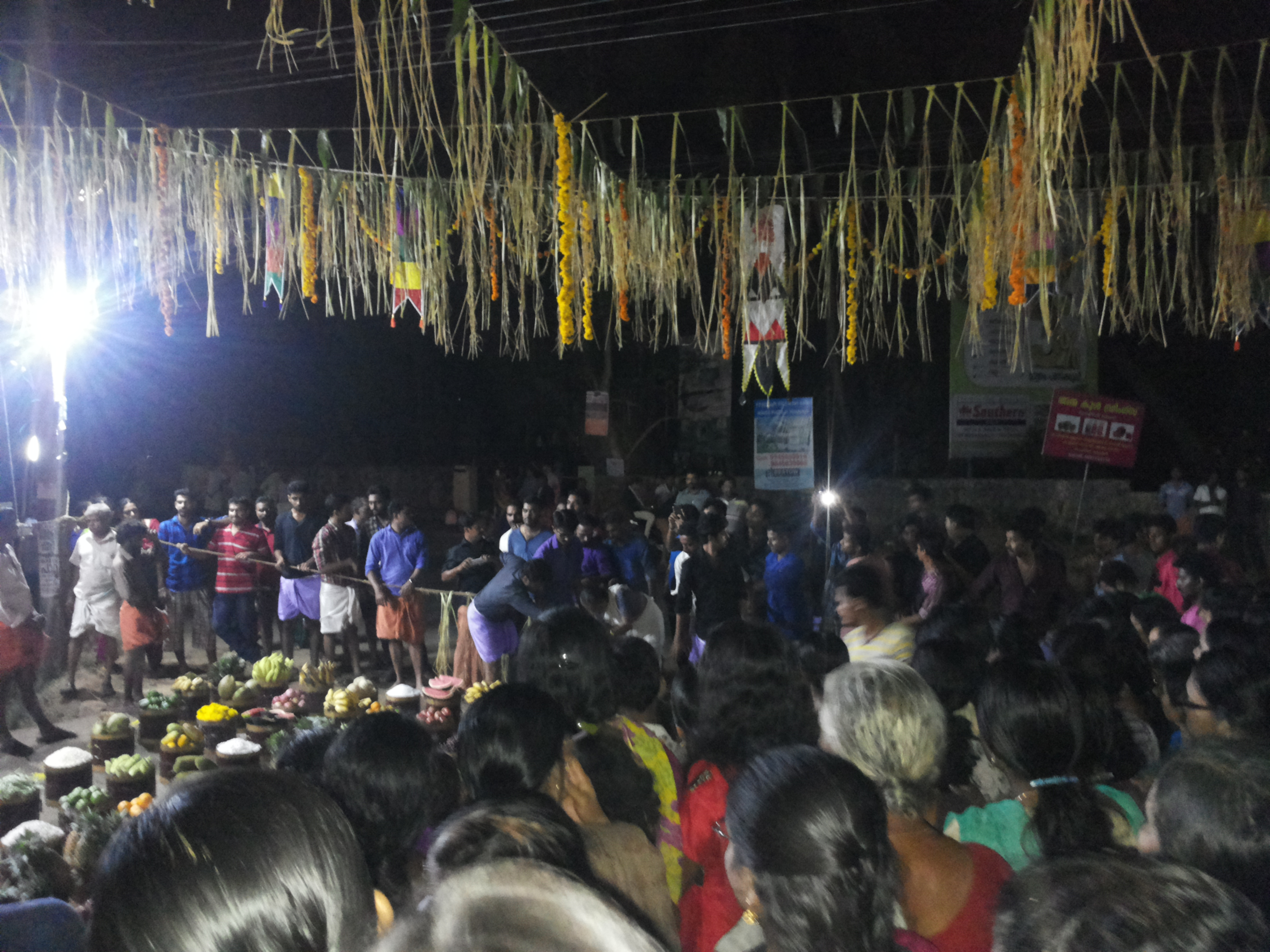
- Kolazhy Pooram festival
- Interactive map of Kolazhy Grama Panchayat
- Coordinates: 10°35′06″N 76°12′56″E
- Country: India
- State: Kerala
- District: Thrissur
- Taluk: Thrissur
- Block: Puzhakkal Block Panchayat
- Established: 1951
- Lok Sabha Constituency: Alathur (Constituency #9)
- നിയമസഭ (Niyamasabha) (or Vidhan Sabha or Legislative Assembly) Constituency: Wadakkanchery (Constituency #65)

Government
  - Type: Grama Panchayat
  - Body: Kolazhy Grama Panchayat

Area
  - Total: 4.64 km^{2} (1.79 sq mi)
- Elevation: 14 m (46 ft)
- Demonym: Kolazhykaran

Languages
  - Official: Malayalam, English
- Time zone: UTC+5:30 (IST)
- Postal Index Number (PIN): 680581 - Tirur (Mulagunnathukavu) PO
- Telephone code: +91-487
- Vehicle registration: KL-08
- Climate: Tropical monsoon (Köppen Am)
- Website: http://lsgkerala.in/kolazhypanchayat/

Kolazhy Grama Panchayat, also known as Kolazhy GP, is part of Puzhakkal block, in Thrissur taluk, in Thrissur district. It is located 6.8 kilometres (4.2 mi) north of Thrissur city. The group of villages forming the wards given in the table below are governed by Kolazhy Grama Panchayat, Puzhakkal Block Panchayat and Thrissur District Panchayat.

== Demographics ==
As of 2001 India census, Kolazhy had a population of 8,445. Males constitute 49% of the population and females 51%. Kolazhy has an average literacy rate of 85%, higher than the national average of 59.5%: male literacy is 86%, and female literacy is 84%. In Kolazhy, 10% of the population is under the age of six. A majority of the population had migrated here for residential purposes, as they are employed in the government & private sectors.

== History ==
In ancient days it was then part of Vijayapuram "pravrithi" in Trichur "taluq".

For the purposes of census, Kolazhy Grama Panchayat is divided into three census towns of Kolazhy (CT), Kuttur (CT) and Pottore (CT).

#	Kolazhy Grama Panchayat Ward # - Name	Puzhakkal Block Panchayat Ward # - Name	Thrissur District Panchayat Ward # - Name	Census Town
1	01 - Kunnathupeedika	08 - Kunnathupeedika	08 - Avanur	Pottore (CT)
2	02 - Attore North	08 - Kunnathupeedika	08 - Avanur	Pottore (CT)
3	03 - Pottore North	08 - Kunnathupeedika	08 - Avanur	Pottore (CT)
4	04 - Thiroor	09 - Kolazhy	08 - Avanur	Kolazhy (CT)
5	05 - Puthanmadamkunnu	09 - Kolazhy	08 - Avanur	Kolazhy (CT)
6	06 - Athekkad	09 - Kolazhy	08 - Avanur	Kolazhy (CT)
7	07 - Kolazhy North	09 - Kolazhy	08 - Avanur	Kolazhy (CT)
8	08 - Kolazhy Centre	09 - Kolazhy	08 - Avanur	Kolazhy (CT)
9	09 - Poovany	09 - Kolazhy	08 - Avanur	Kolazhy (CT)
10	10 - Kolazhy West	09 - Kolazhy	08 - Avanur	Kolazhy (CT)
11	11 - Pottore South	08 - Kunnathupeedika	08 - Avanur	Pottore (CT)
12	12 - Attore South	08 - Kunnathupeedika	08 - Avanur	Pottore (CT)
13	13 - Pamboor	08 - Kunnathupeedika	08 - Avanur	Kuttur (CT)
14	14 - Kuttur East	08 - Kunnathupeedika	08 - Avanur	Kuttur (CT)
15	15 - Kuttur West	08 - Kunnathupeedika	08 - Avanur	Kuttur (CT)
16	16 - Kuttur North	08 - Kunnathupeedika	08 - Avanur	Kuttur (CT)
17	17 - Kottekkad	08 - Kunnathupeedika	08 - Avanur	Kuttur (CT)

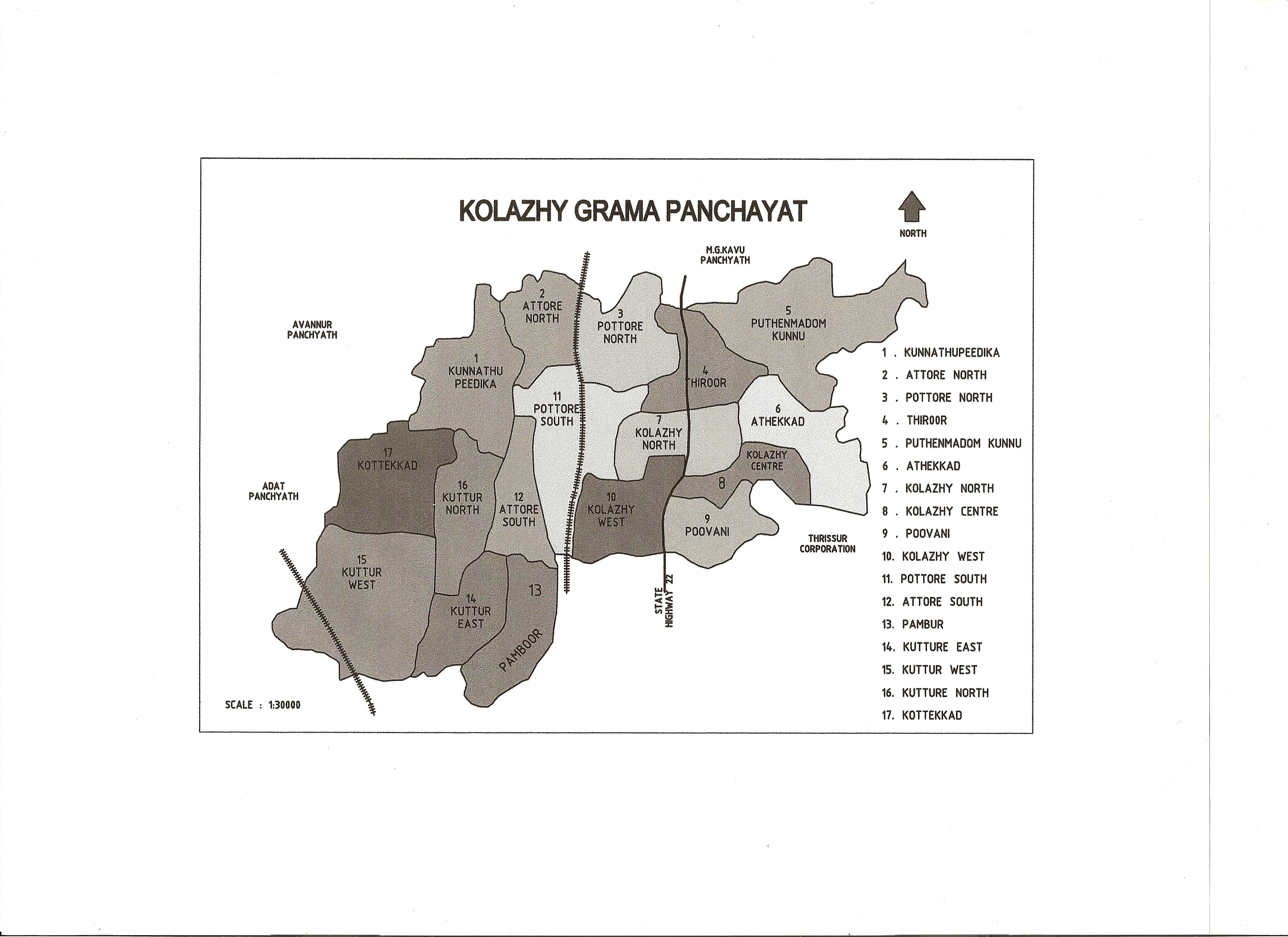
Kolazhy Grama Panchayat Wards

== Administration ==
The administration of the panchayat is done by a council consisting of 17 members elected from the wards of the panchayat. The council will rule for a period of 5 years. Presently, it is ruled by LDF. The front secured majority by winning 12 out of 17 seats in the elections held in December 2020.

== Panchayath Elections ==
=== Election 2010 ===
Total Seats	UDF	LDF	NDA	IND
17	10	7	0	0

=== Election 2015 ===
Total Seats	UDF	LDF	NDA	IND
17	10	7	0	0

=== Election 2020 ===
Total Seats	LDF	UDF	NDA	IND
17	12	5	0	0

== Education ==
- Chinmaya Mission College, Kolazhy
