= Puzhakkal Block Panchayat =

- Block Panchayat
- (India) Flag
- Location of Puzhakkal Block Panchayat in Kerala, India Puzhakkal Block Panchayat (India)
- Coordinates: 10°33′12″N 76°09′59″E
- Country: India
- State: Kerala
- District: Thrissur
- Taluk: Thrissur
- Block: Puzhakkal Block Panchayat

Government
  - Type: Block Panchayat
  - Body: Puzhakkal Block Panchayat

Languages
  - Official: Malayalam, English
- Time zone: UTC+5:30 (IST)
- Postal Index Number (PIN): 680551 - Puranattukara (Thrissur) PO
- Telephone code: +91-487
- Vehicle registration: KL-08
- Climate: Tropical monsoon (Köppen Am)
- Website: http://lsgkerala.in/puzhakkalblock/

Puzhakkal Block Panchayat is a major block panchayat in Thrissur taluk, Thrissur district It is located 6.8 kilometres (4.2 mi) north of Thrissur city. It is named after Puzhakkal River that passes through this region.

The grama panchayats that constitute Puzhakkal Block Panchayat are:

#	Grama Panchayat Name
1	Adat
2	Kolazhy
3	Avanur
4	Kaiparambu
5	Mulakunnathukavu
6	Tholur

Being one of the main blocks of the district, the block office is Puranattukara, Thrissur. As major revenue and business block and a residential area of Thrissur city in Kerala state, it is mostly either industrial and agricultural.

== Economy ==
Now, it has become the most developed suburban area of Thrissur city. Many of the major nerve centres of Thrissur City, including the Thrissur Collectorate, Government Medical College Thrissur, Vilangan Hills, Kerala Institute of Local Administration (KILA), Amala Institute of Medical Sciences, Central Sanskrit University, Government Law College, Thrissur, Kendriya Vidyalaya, District Industries Centre of Kerala Govt., Ministry of Micro Small and Medium Enterprises under Government of India(MSME) and many more are in the block.

Many major automotive companies have commercial spaces here, including Hero Motors, Tata Motors, Nissan, Hyundai, Toyota, Suzuki, Honda and more. A national-level tennis academy is also attracting tennis players here.

== Industrial park ==
KINFRA is setting up an industrial park in Puzhakkal. The park would be set up in 50 acres (200,000 m^{2}). and that the Industries Department would retain 10 acres (40,000 m^{2}) in it. The enterprises to be set up include units for ornaments, apparels and diamond cutting.
