= Wadakkanchery Assembly constituency =

Constituency of the Kerala legislative assembly in India

Coordinates: 10.66°N 76.25°E

Wadakkanchery
- Constituency No. 65 for the Kerala Legislative Assembly
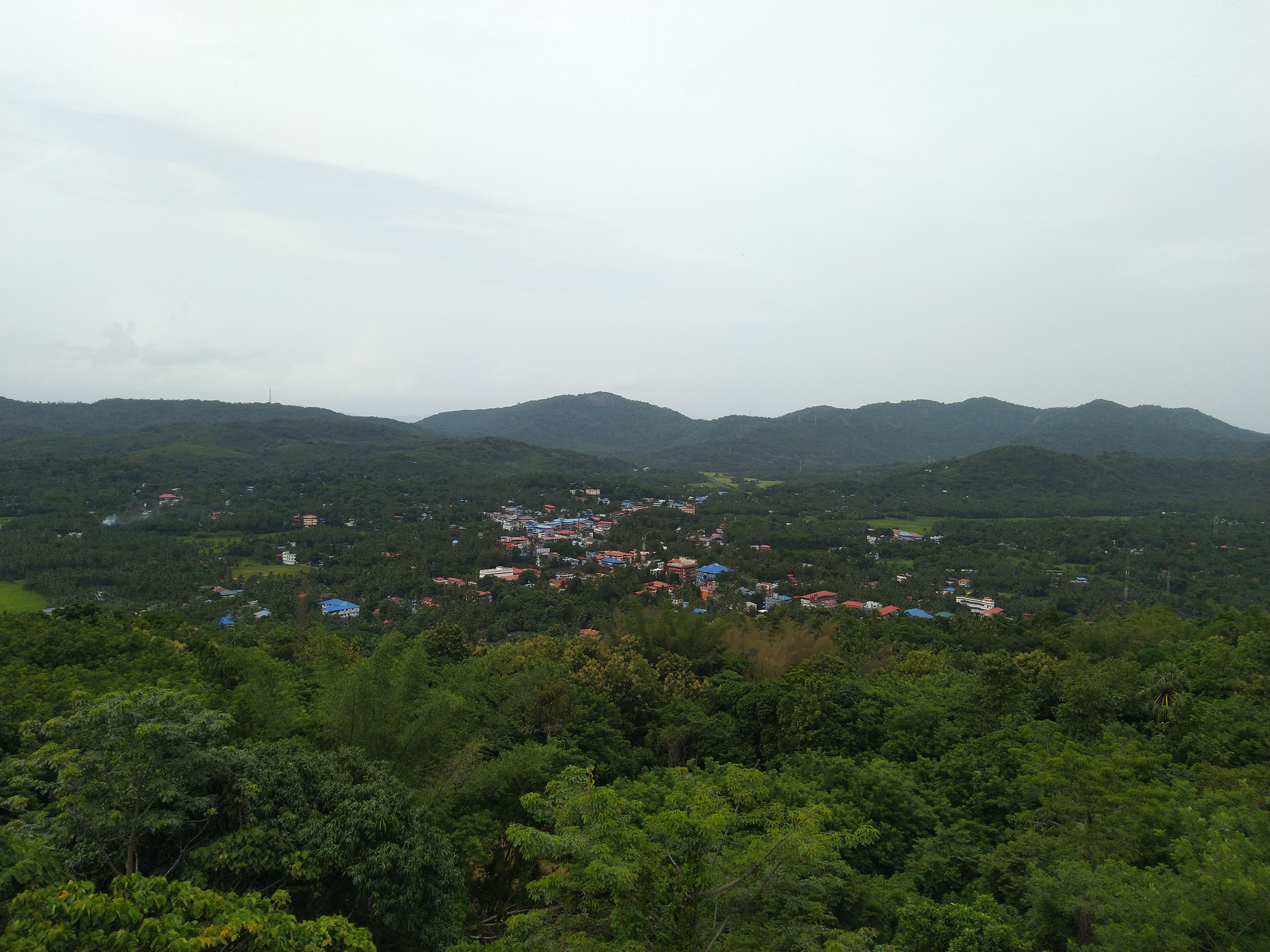
- Aerial view of Wadakkancherry town

Constituency details
- Country: India
- Region: South India
- State: Kerala
- District: Thrissur
- Lok Sabha constituency: Alathur
- Established: 1957
- Total electors: 2,23,003 (2021)
- Reservation: None

Member of Legislative Assembly
- 16th Kerala Legislative Assembly
- Incumbent Xavier Chittilappilly
- Party: CPI(M)
- Alliance: LDF
- Elected year: 2026

Wadakkanchery State assembly constituency is one of the 140 state legislative assembly constituencies in Kerala. It is also one of the seven state legislative assembly constituencies included in Alathur Lok Sabha constituency. As of the 2026 Assembly elections, the current MLA is Xavier Chittilappilly of CPI(M).

== Local self-governed segments ==
Wadakkanchery Assembly constituency is composed of the following local self-governed segments:

Sl no.	Name	Status (Grama panchayat/Municipality)	Taluk	Panchayat President
1	Wadakkanchery	Municipality	Thalapilly	
2	Thekkumkara	Grama panchayat	Thalapilly	Sunil Kumar
3	Adat	Grama panchayat	Thrissur	
4	Avanur	Grama panchayat	Thrissur	
5	Kaiparamba	Grama panchayat	Thrissur	
6	Kolazhy	Grama panchayat	Thrissur	
7	Mulakunnathukavu	Grama panchayat	Thrissur	
8	Tholur	Grama panchayat	Thrissur	

== Members of Legislative Assembly ==
The following list contains all members of Kerala Legislative Assembly who have represented the constituency:

Key

INC INC(I) CPI(M) CPI PSP SSP

Election	Niyama Sabha	Member	Party	Tenure
1957	1st	C. C. Ayyappan	CPI	1957 – 1960
1957	1st	K. Kochukuttan	INC	1957 – 1960
1960	2nd	K. Balakrishna Menon	PSP	1960 – 1965
1960	2nd	K. Kochukuttan	INC	1960 – 1965
1967	3rd	N. K. Seshan	SSP	1967 – 1970
1970	4th	A. S. N. Nambissan	CPI(M)	1970 – 1977
1977	5th	K. S. Narayanan Namboodiri	INC	1977 – 1980
1980	6th	K. S. Narayanan Namboodiri	INC(I)	1980 – 1982
1982	7th	K. S. Narayanan Namboodiri	INC(I)	1982 – 1987
1987	8th	K. S. Narayanan Namboodiri	INC	1987 – 1991
1991	9th	K. S. Narayanan Namboodiri	INC	1991 – 1996
1996	10th	Adv. V. Balram	INC	1996 – 2001
2001	11th	Adv. V. Balram	INC	2001 – 2004
2004*	11th	A. C. Moideen	CPI(M)	2004 – 2006
2006	12th	A. C. Moideen	CPI(M)	2006 – 2011
2011	13th	C. N. Balakrishnan	INC	2011 – 2016
2016	14th	Anil Akkara	INC	2016-2021
2021	15th	Xavier Chittilappilly	CPI(M)	2021 - 2026
2026	16th	Xavier Chittilappilly	CPI(M)	2026 –

*by-election

== Election results ==
=== 2025 ===
SEGMENTS	LDF	NDA	UDF	IND		LEADING ALLIANCE
WADAKKANCHERRY	17786	6758	15807	579	40930	LDF
THEKKUMKARA	8343	3752	8533	350	20978	UDF
ADAT	7953	4952	8111	324	21340	UDF
AVANUR	6195	2674	5891	924	15684	LDF
KAIPARAMBA	8142	4637	8244	641	21664	UDF
KOLAZHY	8314	3933	8879	119	21245	UDF
MULAKUNNATHUKAVU	5593	1491	5937	94	13115	UDF
THOLUR	4778	1961	5876	307	12922	UDF
TOTAL	67104	30158	67278	3338	167878	
%	39.97188434	17.96423593	40.07553104	1.988348682		

=== 2026 ===
2026 Kerala Legislative Assembly election: Wadakkanchery
Party	Candidate	Votes	%	±%
CPI(M)	Xavier Chittilappilly	70,725	43.22	▼4.48
INC	P. N. Vaisakh	65,035	39.74	▲0.97
BJP	Adv. T. S. Ullas Babu	25,844	15.79	▲2.99
AAP	Jithin Sadananthan	478	0.29	
BSP	Subramanian Penakam	368	0.22	
NOTA	None of the above	1,184	0.72	▲0.22
Margin of victory		5,690	3.48	▼5.45
Turnout		1,63,634		
CPI(M) hold		Swing	▼4.48	

=== 2021 ===
There were 2,23,003 registered voters in the constituency for the 2021 election.

2021 Kerala Legislative Assembly election: Wadakkanchery
Party	Candidate	Votes	%	±%
CPI(M)	Xavier Chittilappilly	81,026	47.70	▲6.71
INC	Anil Akkara	65,858	38.77	▼2.25
BJP	Adv. T. S. Ullas Babu	21,747	12.80	▼3.88
Independent	Haji Aboobaker Kundukadan	388	0.23	−
NOTA	None of the Above	842	0.5	−
Margin of victory		15,168	8.93	
Turnout		1,69,861	76.17	▼4.74
CPI(M) gain from INC		Swing	▲6.71	

=== 2016 ===
There were 1,97,483 registered voters in the constituency for the 2016 election.

2016 Kerala Legislative Assembly election: Wadakkanchery
Party	Candidate	Votes	%	±%
INC	Anil Akkara	65,535	41.02	▼7.70
CPI(M)	Mary Thomas	65,492	40.99	▼3.48
BJP	Adv. T. S. Ullas Babu	26,652	16.68	▲11.33
NOTA	None of the above	969	0.6	−
SDPI	Gaddafi A. K.	477	0.30	−
BSP	P. K. Subramanian	419	0.26	▼0.76
Independent	Anil	237	0.15	−
Margin of victory		43	0.03	
Turnout		1,59,781	80.91	▲1.41
INC hold		Swing	▼7.70	

=== 2011 ===
There were 1,76,069 registered voters in the constituency for the 2011 election.

2011 Kerala Legislative Assembly election: Wadakkanchery
Party	Candidate	Votes	%	±%
INC	C. N. Balakrishnan	67,911	48.79	
CPI(M)	N. R. Balan	61,226	44.47	
BJP	Shajumon Vattakad	7,451	5.35	
BSP	Govindan Machad	1,419	1.02	
Independent	Balakrishnan	1,177	0.85	
Margin of victory		6,685	4.80	
Turnout		1,31,718	79.05	
INC gain from CPI(M)		Swing		
