= M. R. Chandrasekharan =

Indian author and critic (1929–2024)

- Chandrasekharan in 2012
- Born: 26 February 1929; Pottore, Thrissur, Kingdom of Cochin, India
- Died: 4 December 2024 (aged 95); Ernakulam, Kochi, Kerala, India
- Citizenship: India
- Education: Master's
- Alma mater: Lower Secondary School, Tirur; Vivekodayam Boys Higher Secondary School, Thrissur; Sree Kerala Varma College, Thrissur; Madras University; Kerala University
- Occupations: Literary Critic, Professor, Editor
- Title: Professor

Malappurath Raman Chandrasekharan (26 February 1929 – 4 December 2024), also known as M. R. C., was an Indian Malayalam literary critic and author from Kerala. Chandrasekharan published more than 50 books in different literary sections like literary criticism, translations, politics, social etc. He also worked in the field of journalism and education. He won the 2010 Kerala Sahitya Akademi Award for Literary Criticism.

== Biography ==
Chandrasekharan was born on 26 February 1929 at Pottore, Thrissur in Kerala. His childhood days were spent in the village where he attended the Tirur Lower Secondary School and Vivekodayam High School, Thrissur. He took his bachelor's degree from Sree Kerala Varma College, Thrissur, BOL from University of Madras and later his master's degree from Kerala University in Malayalam language and literature.

Chandrasekharan started his career as a journalist in Navajeevan edited by Joseph Mundassery for the CPI. Subsequently, he joined as a sub-editor in Mathrubhumi daily in Kozhikode, but was sent out for his communist leanings.

He worked as a school teacher at Kodakara National High School and Bekal Govt. High School. He joined as a lecturer at Malabar Christian College, Kozhikode, in 1956 and moved to Payyannur College, Kannur as senior lecturer in 1965. He retired from Payyannur College, Kannur after over 30 years of teaching service in the year 1989. After retirement he also worked as Malayalam Professor in Sree Sankaracharya University of Sanskrit.

He later settled at Ananganadi P.O.Panamanna, Ottappalam in Palghat district, Kerala. He was active with his writings and enjoyed the challenge of organic farming.

Chandrasekharan died on 4 December 2024, at the age of 95.

== Positions held ==
Chandrasekharan was very much involved in The All Kerala Private College Teachers' Association (AKPCTA) and was a college committee secretary, regional secretary, regional president, general secretary and president of the association. As association representative, he was elected to the Calicut University senate and syndicate.

He was a member of Kerala Sahithya Academy general council and its executive committee.

Chandrasekharan was one of the directors of the Calicut City Service Co-Operative Bank from 2006 to 2013.

He was a member of the Academic Council of Thunchath Ezhuthachan Malayalam University established in 2012.

In 1961, when Kerala Sahithya Samiti was formed with Kuttipuzha Krishna Pillai as president, S. K. Pottekkatt as vice-president, N. V. Krishna Warrier as general secretary in Kozhikode, MRC and Vayalar Ramavarma were named secretaries. MRC was later general secretary and president of the organisation.

He was also involved in the formation in 1969 of the Deshabhimani Study Circle, cited as a vigorous and widespread literary movement in Kerala along with E. M. S. Namboodiripad, M.S.Devadas and P.Govindapillai.

He published the literary critical journal Sahithya Samithi Masika from Payyanur from 1976 to 1980.

In 1969, when he was the research officer at Kerala Bhasha Institute, he worked as the executive editor of the magazine Vignana Kairali (Malayalam: വിജ്ഞാനകൈരളി).

After retirement in 1989, he took up the editorship of a magazine called Chindana (Malayalam: ചിന്തന ) published in Kannur.

He was the editor of CMP's weekly journal Malayala Mannu (Malayalam:മലയാളമണ്ണ്) from 1990 to 2013.

== Awards and honours ==
Chandrasekharan won the 2010 Kerala Sahitya Akademi Award for Literary Criticism for his book Malayalam Novel Innum Innaleyum.

He won the Dr. C.P.Menon Award for The Study of the Progressive School in Literature for his book Keralathile purogamana sahitya prastanathinte charithram in 2005.

Chandrasekharan also won the M. N. Sathyaardhi Award in recognition of his contributions to Malayalam literature as a translator. The award was instituted by the M.N. Sathyarthi Trust in memory of the writer who is remembered for his translations of many popular Indian-language works into Malayalam.

He was awarded the MVR award in 2018.

== Bibliography ==
=== Literary criticism ===
List of Literary Criticism by M. R. C.

#	Name	Translation in English	Year of publishing, Publisher
1	Laghuniroopanangal; Malayalam: ലഘുനിരൂപണങ്ങള്‍	Light Critical Works	1964, P.K.Bros Calicut
2	Niroopakante Raajyabaaram; Malayalam: നിരൂപകന്‍റെ രാജ്യഭാരം	The Critic's Sway	1965, Current Books Thrissur
3	Sathyavum Kavithayum; Malayalam: സത്യവും കവിതയും	Reality and Poetry	1979, Poorna Publications Calicut
4	Gopuram; Malayalam: ഗോപുരം	The Tower	1989, Current Books Thrissur
5	Grandhapooja; Malayalam: ഗ്രന്ഥപൂജ	Worshiping Books	1996, S.P.C.S.Ltd Kottayam
6	Communist Kavithrayam; Malayalam: കമ്മ്യൂണിസ്റ്റ് കവിത്രയം	Three Communist Poets - P. Bhaskaran, Vayalar Ramavarma, O.N.V. Kurup	1998, Current Books Thrissur
7	Malayala Sahityam Swaathanthrya Labdikku Shesham; Malayalam: മലയാളസാഹിത്യം സ്വാതന്ത്ര്യലബ്ധിക്കുശേഷം	Malayalam Literature after the attainment of Independence	1999, S.P.C.S.Ltd Kottayam
8	Ezhuthile Ponnu; Malayalam: എഴുത്തിലെ പൊന്ന്	The Golden Writing	2001, Prabhat Book House Trivandrum
9	Maneeshikal; Malayalam: മനീഷികള്‍	The visionaries among writers	2005, Lipi Book Publishers Calicut
10	Malayalam Novel Innum Innaleyum; Malayalam: മലയാളനോവല്‍ ഇന്നും ഇന്നലെയും	Malayalam Novel - Today and Yesterday	2007, Samayam Books Kannur
11	Mundassery - Sahithya Vimarshanathinte Prathaapa Kaalam; Malayalam: മുണ്ടശ്ശേരി - സാഹിത്യവിമര്‍ശനത്തിന്‍റെ പ്രതാപകാലം	Mundasseri - Golden Years of Literary Criticism	2008, Green Books Thrissur
12	Krishnagadha Vimarshanam - chila thiruthalukal Malayalam: കൃഷ്ണഗാഥാ വിമര്‍ശനം - ചില തിരുത്തലുകള്‍	Criticism of Krishnagatha- Some Corrections	2008, Poorna Books Calicut
13	Adyathma Ramayanam Vimarshanam; Malayalam: അദ്ധ്യാത്മരാമായണം വിമര്‍ശനം	Criticism of Ramayana, The Epic	2008, Samayam Books Kannur
14	Shishirathile Pookkal; Malayalam: ശിശിരത്തിലെ പൂക്കള്‍	Flowers in the Winter	2010, S.P.C.S.Ltd Kottayam
15	Karamullum Kaattupookkalude Karachilum; Malayalam: കാരമുള്ളും കാട്ടുപൂക്കളുടെ കരച്ചിലും	The Thorns and Cries of Wild flowers	2012, Kerala Sahithya Academy Thrissur
16	Theechoolayil Venthurukaathe; Malayalam: തീച്ചൂളയില്‍ വെന്തുരുകാതെ	Life inside a Furnace	2012, S.P.C.S.Ltd Kottayam
17	Keralathile purogamana sahitya prastanathinte charithram - Sahithya prastana padanam Malayalam: കേരളത്തിലെ പുരോഗമനസാഹിത്യപ്രസ്ഥാനത്തിന്‍റെ ചരിത്രം - സാഹിത്യപ്രസ്ഥാനപഠനം	History of Forward Thinking Literary Movement in Kerala	1996, Olive Books Calicut
18	Swapnadanam; Malayalam: സ്വപ്നാടനം	Literary Criticism of selected works of O.V.Vijayan and Mohan Kumar.	2022, India Books Calicut
18	Mahakavi Sapthakam; Malayalam: മഹാകവി സപ്തകം	Poetical Criticism of seven Poets in malayalam	2020, Green Books, Thrissur

=== Political thinking ===
List of Political Monographs by M. R. C.

#	Name	Translation in English	Year of publishing, publisher
1	Communism chila thiruthalukal Malayalam: കമ്മ്യൂണിസം-ചില തിരുത്തലുകള്‍	Communism - Some Critical notes	1999, Kalaveekshanam Books Calicut
2	Keralathile Communism; Malayalam: കേരളത്തിലെ കമ്മ്യൂണിസം	Communism in Kerala	2000, Kalaveekshanam Books Calicut
3	Kerala modelilekku oru kilivaathil Malayalam: കേരളമോഡലിലേക്കു ഒരു കിളിവാതില്‍	An eye on the Kerala Model	2001, Haritham Books Calicut
4	Marx nte viplavavum Lenin nte athiviplavavum Malayalam: മാർക്സിന്റെ വിപ്ലവവും ലെനിന്റെ അതിവിപ്ലവവും	Revolution of Marx and Extreme revolution of Lenin	2018, Self Publication
5	Chenkodi parvam Malayalam: ചെങ്കൊടി പര്‍വം	The Reds	2022, India Books

=== Social ===
List of Social Books by M. R. C.

List of Social Books by M. R. C.

#	Name	Translation in English	Year of publishing, Publisher
1	Manushyavakaashangal; Malayalam: മനുഷ്യാവകാശങ്ങള്‍	Human Rights (Translation)	1962, Southern Languages Book Trust Madras
2	India innu evide nilkkunnu Malayalam: ഇന്ത്യ ഇന്ന് എവിടെ നില്‍ക്കുന്നു	whither stands India Today	2003, State Institute of Languages Trivandrum
3	Universitykalile Upaplavangal; Malayalam: യൂണിവേഴ്സിറ്റികളിലെ ഉപപ്ലവങ്ങൾ	Heteronomy in Universities	2021, India Books Kozhikode

=== Memoirs ===
List of Memoirs by M. R. C.

#	Name	Translation in English	Year of publishing, Publisher
1	Oormayude Pushtakam; Malayalam: ഓര്‍മ്മയുടെ പുസ്തകം	A Book of Memories	2003, Current Books Thrissur
2	Sahithyathil Diggajangalude oru kalaghattam Malayalam: സാഹിത്യത്തില്‍ ദിഗ്ഗജങ്ങളുടെ ഒരു കാലഘട്ടം	The Time of Colossal figures in Malayalam Literature	2006, Poorna Publications Calicut
3	Ente jeevithakadhayile N.V parvam Malayalam: എന്‍റെ ജീവിതകഥയിലെ എന്‍.വി. പര്‍വ്വം	The N. V. Chapter in my literary life story	2010, 2016 2nd Edition Green Books Thrissur
4	Kudumba parvam Malayalam: കുടുംബപര്‍വ്വം	The Family Chapter of my life story	2011, Maluban Publishers Trivandrum
5	Balikuteerangalkkoru Ormapusthakam; Malayalam: ബലികുടീരങ്ങള്‍ക്ക് ഒരു ഓര്‍മ്മപുസ്തകം	A memoir for sacrificial stone temples	2015, Green Books Thrissur
6	Samgrama parvangal Malayalam: സംഗ്രാമ പര്‍വങ്ങള്‍	Different battles of my life	2022, India Books Calicut

=== Novel translation ===
List of Novel Translation by M. R. C.

#	Name	Translation in English	Original	Year of publishing, Publisher
1	Padivathilkkal; Malayalam: പടിവാതിൽക്കൽ	At the outer gate	On the eve, Russian, Ivan Turgenev	1955, Prabhath Book House Ernakulam
2	Kokoro; Malayalam: കൊകോറോ	Kokoro	Japanese Novel	1962, Southern Languages Book Trust Madras
3	Uzhuthumaricha Puthumannu; Malayalam: ഉഴുതുമറിച്ച പുതുമണ്ണ്	Virgin Soil Upturned	Russian, Mikhail Sholokhov	1962, CICC Books Ernakulam
4	Don Nadeetheerathe Koithu; Malayalam: ഡോണ്‍നദീതീരത്തെ കൊയ്ത്ത്	Harvest on the Don	Russian, Mikhail Sholokhov	1962, CICC Books Ernakulam; 2015, S.P.C.S. Ltd. Kottayam
5	Genghis Khan; Malayalam: ഝഖിസ്ഖാന്‍	Genghis Khan-The world Conqueror (Historical Biography)	Harold Lamb	1963, Current Books Thrissur
6	Timoor; Malayalam: തിമൂർ	Timoor Historical Biography	Tamerlane Harold Lamb	1963, Current Books Thrissur
7	Maattivecha Talakal; Malayalam: മാറ്റിവെച്ച തലകള്‍	The Transposed Heads	German, Thomas Mann	1979, Chintha Books Trivandrum New Edition 2024, Freelance Books Thrissur
8	Kalanju Kittiya Mookku; Malayalam: കളഞ്ഞുകിട്ടിയ മൂക്ക്	The Nose	Russian, Nikolai Gogol	2006, Lipi Publications Calicut

=== Science translation ===
List of Science Translation by M. R. C.

#	Name	Translation in English	Year of publishing
1	Naam jeevikkunna ee lookam Malayalam: നാം ജീവിക്കുന്ന ഈ ലോകം	The World We Live in	1959, Mathrubhumi Co Calicut
2	maanathekku nookkumpol Malayalam: മാനത്തേക്കു നോക്കുമ്പോള്‍	Let us Look at the Sky	1961, Southern Languages Book Trust Madras

=== Children's literature ===
List of Children's Literature by M. R. C.

#	Name	Translation in English	Original	Year of publishing, Publisher
1	Srugaalan enna kurukkan Malayalam: സൃഗാലന്‍ എന്ന കുറുക്കന്‍	A Fox Named Srigalan	Reynard the fox(British Folklore)	2004, Current Books Thrissur
2	moonnu bala saahithya kruthikal Malayalam: മൂന്നു ബാലസാഹിത്യകൃതികള്‍	Three Stories for Children	Oscar Wilde	2010, Lipi Publications Calicut

=== Other genres ===
List of other genres by M. R. C.

#	Name	Translation in English	Year of publishing, publisher
1	Mushaayira; Malayalam: മുശായിര	Poem Collections Kerala Sahithya Samiti	2004, Prabhakar Book Stall Shornur
2	aana undaayirunna veedu Malayalam: ആന ഉണ്ടായിരുന്ന വീട്	A House which owned an elephant (novel)	2012, Samayam Books Kannur
3	Vilakkukal Puthiyathum Pazhayathum; Malayalam: വിളക്കുകൾ പുതിയതും പഴയതും	Collection of literary articles	2016, S.P.C.S Ltd. Kottayam
4	Vilakkukal Puthiyathum Pazhayathum; Malayalam: എൻ വി യുടെ തെരഞ്ഞെടുത്ത പ്രബന്ധങ്ങൾ	Collection of essays by N.V.Krishna Warrier	2006, Kerala Sahitya Akademi, Thrissur

=== Journals edited ===
List of journels edited by M. R. C.

#	Name	Publisher
1	Yuva Bhavana; Malayalam: യുവഭാവന	Published from Calicut
2	Vijnana Kairali; Malayalam: വിജ്ഞാന കൈരളി	Journal of Kerala Language Institute, Tvm
3	Sahithya Samithi Masika; Malayalam: സാഹിത്യ സമിതി മാസിക	Published from Payyannur, Kannur District
4	Chinthana Weekly; Malayalam: ചിന്തന	Published from Kannur District
5	Malayala Mannu Weekly; Malayalam: മലയാള മണ്ണ്	Published from Kannur District
