= Aloor, Kerala =

Aloor Alur
- Village and Panchayat
- Location in Kerala, India Aloor (India)
- Coordinates: 10°20′22″N 76°17′40″E
- Country: India
- State: Kerala
- District: Thrissur

Languages
  - Official: Malayalam, English
- Time zone: UTC+5:30 (IST)
- PIN: 680683
- Telephone code: 0480
- Vehicle registration: KL-45

Aloor (Malayalam pronunciation: [aːɭuːɾ]) is a panchayat in the Chalakudy-Mukundapuram taluk in the Thrissur district of Kerala, India. It is located near the towns of Irinjalakuda and Chalakudi. Since 1901, the name "Aloor" has been simplified to "Alur" by the Cochin State and Central Government departments.

== Administration ==
Aloor is a revenue village in Chalakudy taluk of the Irinjalakuda Revenue Division in the Thrissur district. Its sub-registrar office is situated in Kallettumkara. Aloor falls under the Thrissur Lok Sabha and Irinjalakuda Assembly constituency.

=== Aloor Panchayat ===
Aloor Panchayat is part of the Irinjalakuda legislative constituency.

Seat distribution of Aloor panchayath in 2020 Election

ALLIANCE	SEATS
LDF	16
UDF	7
Total	23

== Geography and climate ==
Under the Köppen climate classification, Aloor has a tropical monsoon climate. The region lies in the south-western coastal state of Kerala, resulting in a tropical climate; there are only minor differences in temperatures between day and night. Summer lasts from March to May and is followed by the south-west monsoon from June to September. October to November are the post-monsoon or retreating monsoon season. Winter runs from December to February, when it is slightly cooler and windier due to winds from the Western Ghats.
