= Xavier Chittilappilly =

Indian politician

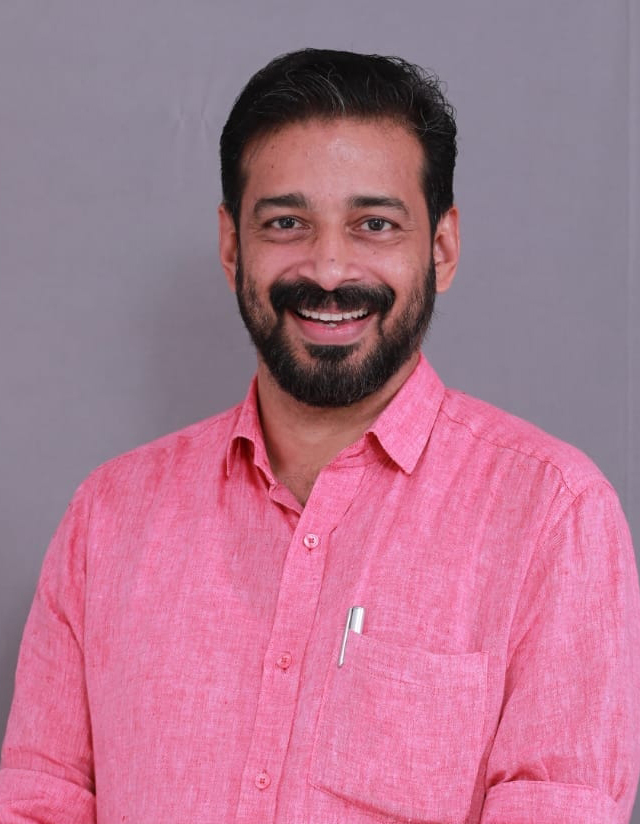
- Xavier Chittilappilly at Wadakkanchery

Member of the Kerala Legislative Assembly for Wadakkanchery
- Incumbent
- Assumed office May 2021
- Preceded by: Anil Akkara
- Constituency: Wadakkancherry

Personal details
- Born: 5 August 1971 (age 55) Wadakkanchery, Kerala, India
- Party: Communist Party of India (Marxist)
- Education: Government Boys High School, Wadakkanchery

Xavier Chittilappilly is an Indian politician and social worker from Kerala, India. Xavier Chittilappilly is an Indian politician serving as the MLA of Wadakkanchery Constituency since May 2021. He is a member of the Communist Party of India (Marxist). He started his political career with Students' Federation of India (SFI) at time of his high school life. Since 2014 he has been the member of CPI(M) Thrissur District Secretariat.

== Early life ==
He was born on 5 August 1971 in Wadakkancherry, Thrissur.

== Political life ==
Xavier Chittilappilly started his public career with the Red Flag at a very young age. During his education at Wadakkanchery Boys High School, he excelled in organizing as Speaker and Deputy Leader and became SFI Unit Secretary. He mobilized students under the white flag and became an area committee member of SFI. He then became an organizer who forgot himself in the youth arena. In recognition of his organizational excellence, he was promoted to the post of DYFI Panchayat Secretary. At the age of 18, Xavier Chittilappilly was elected Block Secretary of DYFI.

During these years, Xavier could win the trust and love of young people with his firm stance and unwavering leadership. Within two years, at the age of 20, he became the member of CPI(M) Area Committee. He regularly traveled to various parts of Wadakkanchery with party activities. The following year, at the age of 22, he became the secretary of the Wadakkanchery Local Committee in 1992. He served as District President and State Committee Member of DYFI. In 1995, at the age of 24, he became a member of the Wadakkanchery Grama Panchayat representing Akamala. In 2000, he was elected from Kumaranellur ward and became the Vice President of Wadakkanchery Grama Panchayat. It was during this period that a network of self-sufficient drinking water schemes was formed to address the acute drinking water problem.

In 2004, K. Muraleedharan came to seek the people's verdict in Wadakkanchery, A. C. Moideen decided to contest against him as the LDF candidate and resigned the position of CPI(M) Area Secretary. At the age of 32, Xavier Chittilappilly was appointed to the post of CPI(M) Wadakkanchery Area Secretary. Xavier led the party and the LDF to victory in the 2004 by-election. In 2006, Xavier Chittilappilly was the one who successfully led the LDF to victory as the constituency secretary when A. C. Moideen continued to be the candidate.

Xavier Chittilappilly, who has been the CPI(M) Wadakkanchery Area Secretary for a decade since 2004, has been a member of the party's district secretariat since 2014. Xavier Chittilappilly was the LDF candidate from Wadakkanchery constituency for the Kerala Legislative Assembly election on 6 April 2021. Xavier Chittilappilly won with a majority of 15,168 votes.

== Elections ==
YEAR	CONSTITUENCY	WON/LOST	PARTY AND GROUP	DEFEATED CANDIDATE	MAJORITY (VOTES)
2021	Wadakkancherry	Won	Communist Party of India (Marxist), LDF	Anil Akkara, Indian National Congress, UDF	15,168
