= Akkara =

Akkara (Telugu: అక్కర) may refer to

- Anil Akkara (born 1972), Indian politician
- Nigel Akkara, Bengali actor
- Akkara Kazhchakal, a 2008–2010 Malayalam sitcom
- Akkara Paha, a 1969 Sri Lankan drama film
