= Chalakudy taluk =

Chalakudy taluk comes under Irinjalakuda Revenue Division of Thrissur district in Kerala, India. It is one of the 77 taluks of Kerala. Chalakudy taluk was formed in the year 2013 by the UDF Government, led by Oommen Chandy. 31 villages from the former subdistrict of Mukundapuram taluk form the new subdistrict.

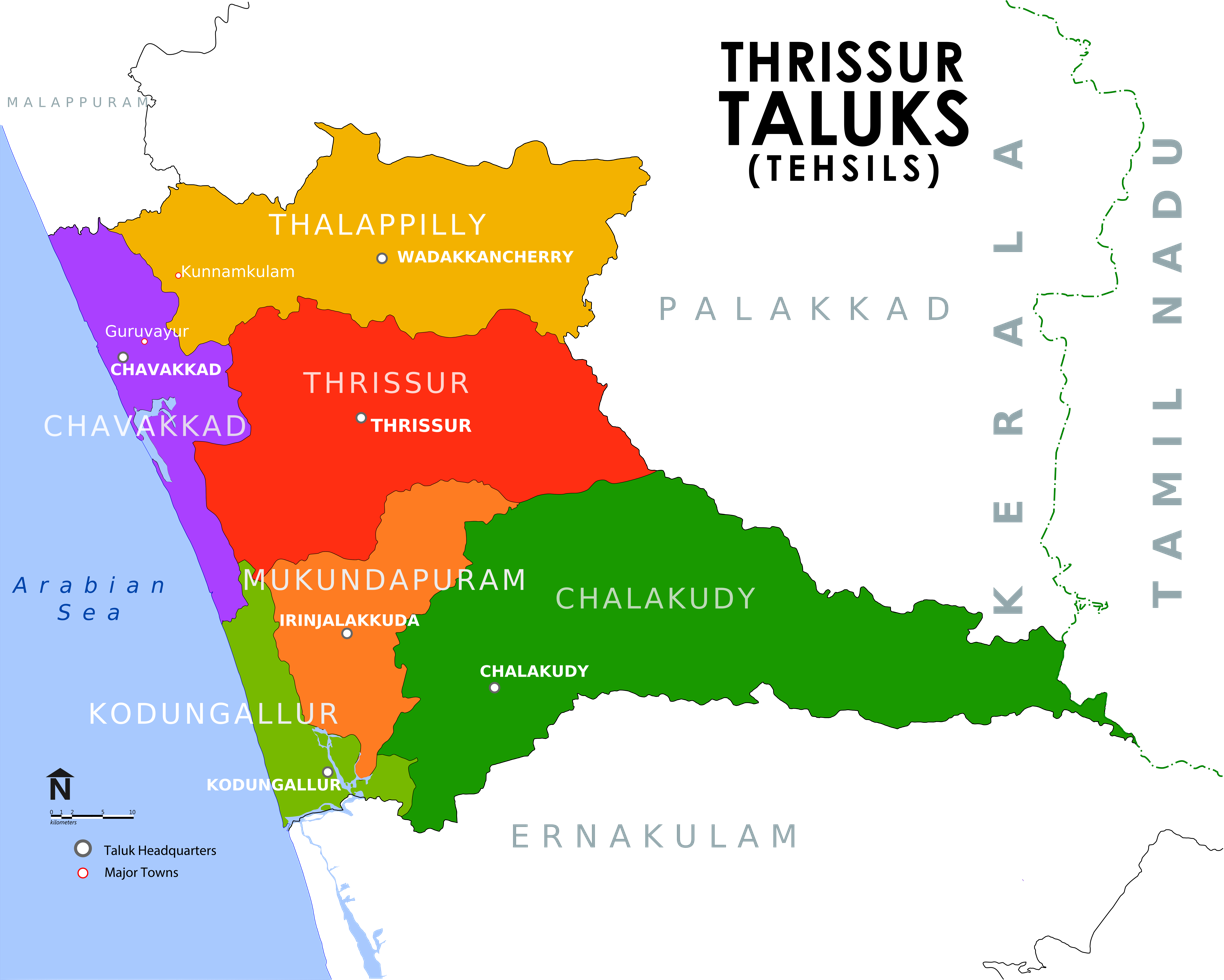
Taluks in Thrissur District

1. Alathur
2. Aloor
3. Annallur
4. Athirappally
5. Elanjipra
6. Kakkulissery
7. Kallettumkara (CT)
8. Kallur Thekkummuri (CT)
9. Kallur Vadakkummuri (CT)
10. Kizhakke chalakkudy
11. Kizhakkummuri
12. Kodakara
13. Kodassery
14. Kuruvilassery
15. Kuttichira
16. Maringoor thekkummuri
17. Mattathur
18. Melur
19. Mupliyam
20. Muringur Vadakkummuri (CT)
21. Nandipulam
22. Padinjare Chalakkudy
23. Pariyaram
24. Perambra
25. Potta
26. Thazhakkadu
27. Thirumukkulam
28. Vadakkumbhagom
29. Vadama (CT)
30. Varandarappilly
31. Vellikulangara

== History ==
Up to AD 1762 Chalakudy and surrounding areas were part of Kodassery nadu. In 1762AD Cochin Maharajah formed Kodassery taluk by adding some other desoms from nearby nadus. In 1860 AD this taluk was abolished and parts were amalgamated into Mukundapuram and Kanayannur taluks. In December 2013 new Chalakudy taluk was formed by bifurcating Mukundapuram Taluk.
