= Mulakunnathukavu =

- Grama Panchayat
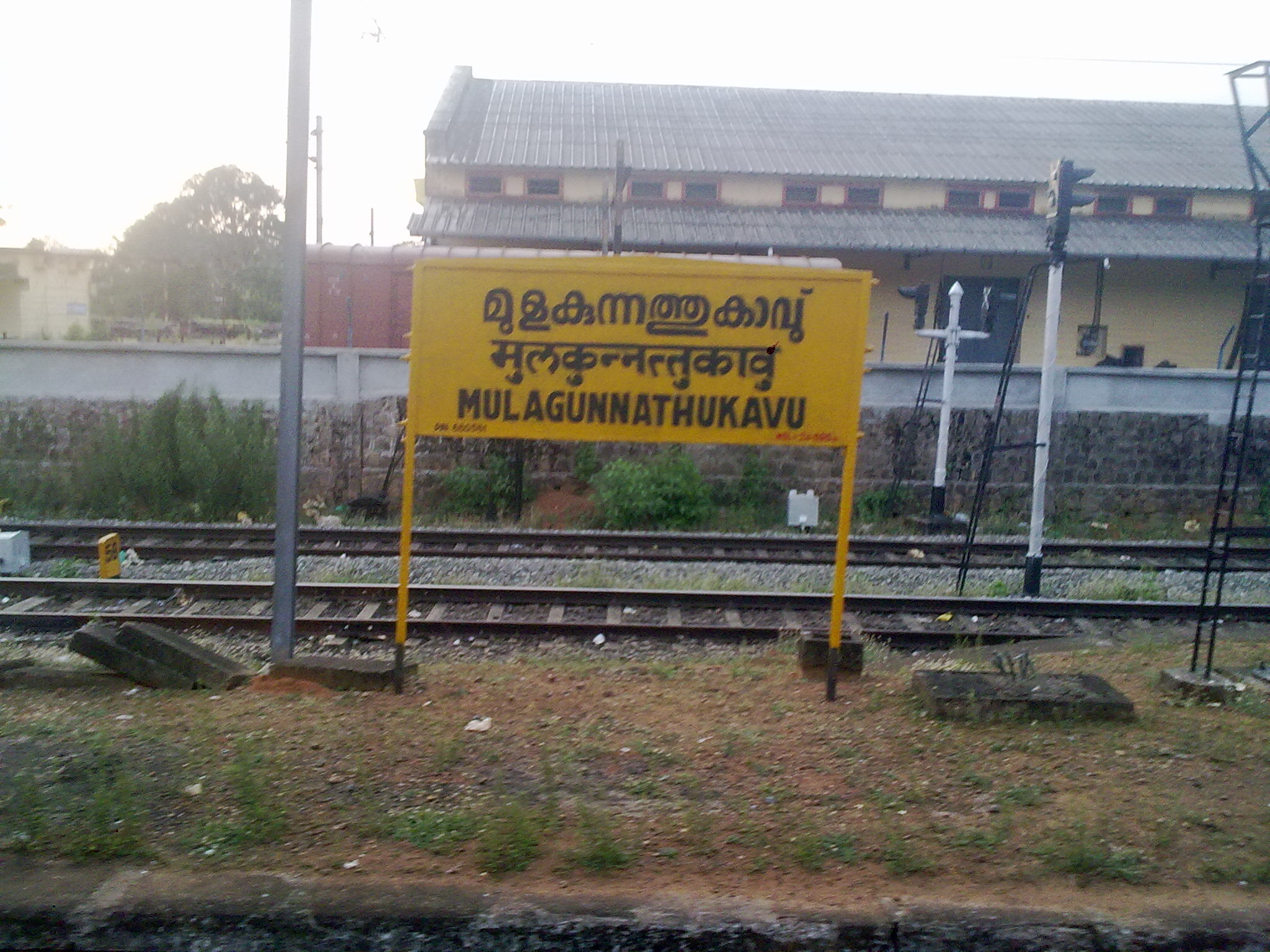
- Mulakunnathukavu Railway Station
- Interactive map of Mulakunnathukavu
- Coordinates: 10°35′48″N 76°12′34″E
- Country: India
- State: Kerala
- District: Thrissur
- Taluk: Thrissur
- Block: Puzhakkal Block Panchayat
- Established: 1951
- Lok Sabha Constituency: Alathur (Constituency #9)
- നിയമസഭ (Niyamasabha) (or Vidhan Sabha or Legislative Assembly) Constituency: Wadakkanchery (Constituency #65)

Government
  - Type: Grama Panchayat
  - Body: Mulakunnathukavu Grama Panchayath

Languages
  - Official: Malayalam, English
- Time zone: UTC+5:30 (IST)
- Postal Index Number (PIN): 680581 - Mulakunnathukavu (Mulagunnathukavu) PO
- Telephone code: +91-487
- Vehicle registration: KL-08
- Climate: Tropical monsoon (Köppen Am)
- Website: http://lsgkerala.in/mulakunnathukavupanchayat

Mulakunnathukavu is part of Puzhakkal block, in Thrissur taluk, in Thrissur district. It is located 9 kilometres (5.6 mi) north of Thrissur city. KILA is located here.

== Transportation ==
- Mulakunnathukavu railway station is located here.
- SH 22 is the major road passing through

== Education ==
- Kerala University of Health Sciences
- Government Medical College, Thrissur
- Westfort Institute of Paramedical Science
- Institute of Management and Technology, Pottor
- FUTURE EDUCITY, Poomala, Thrissur

== Etymology ==
The word "Mulakunnathukavu" can be broken down as, Mula-kunnathu-kavu.

In Malayalam it means ...

- mula => bamboo tree
- kunnathu => atop a hill
- kavu => temple

This translates to ...

- "a temple atop a hill with bamboo trees"

There are different spellings of this panchayat, in various texts, and hence it is worth having a comprehensive list, of all the spellings ...

Correct Spelling: Mulakunnathukavu

#	Misspelling	Comment
1	Mulagunnathukavu	
2	Mulangunnathukavu	
3	Mulamkunnathukavu	
4	Mulankunnathukavu	
5	Mulankunnathukav	
6	M G Kavu	No "g" in correct spelling
7	M.G. Kavu	No "g" in correct spelling
8	MG Kavu	No "g" in correct spelling

== History ==
In ancient days it was then part of Vijayapuram "pravrithi" in Trichur "taluq".

Mulakunnathukavu Grama Panchayat was previously known as "Killannur Grama Panchayat"

== Wards in the village ==
The group of villages forming the wards given in the table below are together governed by Mulakunnathukavu Grama Panchayat. For the purposes of census, the area under Mulakunnathukavu Grama Panchayat comes under Killannur (CT).

Ward Number	Ward Name	Census Town
1	Chirakkunnu	Killannur (CT)
2	Gramala	Killannur (CT)
3	Udayanagar	Killannur (CT)
4	Thiroor Kizhake Angadi	Killannur (CT)
5	Poomala	Killannur (CT)
6	Chottupara	Killannur (CT)
7	Poolakkal	Killannur (CT)
8	Thadaparambu	Killannur (CT)
9	Thiroor	Killannur (CT)
10	Kaleapady	Killannur (CT)
11	Mulakunnathukavu	Killannur (CT)
12	Ammankuzhy	Killannur (CT)
13	Kozhikunnu	Killannur (CT)
14	Akkodikavu	Killannur (CT)
