= Jayasankar C Menon =

Indian basketball player (born 1967)

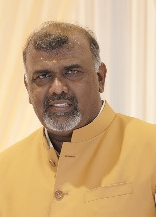

Personal information
- Born: 6 December 1967 (age 57) Wadakkanchery, Thrissur, India
- Listed height: 197 cm (6 ft 6 in)
- Listed weight: 135 kg (298 lb)

Career information
- High school: CMS High School, Thrissur
- College: Sree Kerala Varma College, Thrissur
- Playing career: 1985–2005

Career history
- 1985–1986: Kerala
- 1987-1991: Indian Railways
- 1992-2005: Tamilnadu

Jayasankar C Menon (born 6 December 1967) is an Indian basketballer. He represented India at the international level. Menon was an Asian All-Star player and former captain of the Indian basketball team.

== Life and career ==
Born on December 6, 1967, in Wadakkanchery in Thrissur district, Jayasankar Menon played basketball from a young age. He honed his skills and rose through the ranks, eventually becoming a key player for the Indian national men's team in the 1990s. Menon was an Asian All-Star reserve in 1997. He is employed as an Assistant General Manager, at Indian Bank.

== Basketball ==
Menon played a pivotal role in the establishment of the Indian Basketball Players Association (IBPA), serving as its general secretary and currently serving as its president. He also served as the founder and director of Chennai's Professional Basketball Academy (PBA), where he organized coaching camps and nurtured young talent. He is also the Founder secretary and current President of KESPA (Kerala Sports Persons Association) founded in 2002, contributing to organizing games at the school level. He was the former Chief adviser for Sports for Hindustan group, coordinating sports activities for various colleges. He was also a Member of the Sports Committee of FICCI, working towards key concerns and sports industry development.

== Personal life ==
Menon is married to Prasanna, a former captain of the Indian national women's basketball team. Together, they established the Professional Basketball Academy (PBA) in Chennai.

They have two daughters who were also athletes. The younger daughter Krishna Jayasankar is the first Indian woman thrower, the first women athlete from Tamil Nadu to receive an academic scholarship from the University of Texas.

== Achievements ==
First Basketball Player from the South Asian region to represent ‘The ASIAN ALL STAR’ Basketball team. Represented the Asian All-star Basketball team (comprising the top 16 Basketball players in Asia) at the Basketball extravaganza held in Seoul in 1997.

Captained the Indian Basketball team at the Asian Basketball Championship in 1996 in Seoul.

Winner of 2 Gold Medals in SAF Games held at Colombo ‘91 & Chennai ‘95.

Member of Indian Basketball team which secured ‘Silver Medal’ at the Kelantan International B’ball tournament held at Kota Bharu, Malaysia in ‘91

Represented Indian Basketball team for 11 years including 4 Asian Basketball Confederation Championships.

Bangkok- 1987: Beijing – 1989: Kobe (Japan) – 1991 & Seoul – 1995

At the National Level:

Participated in 15 Senior Nationals and secured Gold Medal 5 times, Silver and Bronze Once.

Recipient of MVP (Most Valuable Player) award in 2 Inter-zone Basketball Championships.

Played for Southern Railways and was instrumental in Indian Railways' dominance in national championships

Awards & Accolades:

Recipient of Guruvacharya Award of the Golden Star Award 2016 constituted by NIER (National Institute of Education and Research), New Delhi

Outstanding Sports Person Award from the Chief Minister of Tamilnadu - 1993.

Outstanding Sports Person Award of Indian Bank - 1992

Member – Sports Committee of Federation of Indian Commerce and Industry (FICCI), Delhi for 4 consecutive years (2009–2012)

Named into the Hoopistani Indian Basketball Hall of Fame

Won accolades including 2 gold medals for India in the South Asian Games
