= Kaiparamba =

Kaiparambu
- village
- Location in Kerala, India Kaiparambu (India)
- Coordinates: 10.608555°N 76.138360°E
- Country: India
- State: Kerala
- District: Thrissur

Population (2011)
  - Total: 7,179

Languages
  - Official: Malayalam, English
- Time zone: UTC+5:30 (IST)
- PIN: 680546
- Vehicle registration: KL-08

Kaiparambu is a village in Thrissur district in the state of Kerala, India.

Kaiparambu is a village belonging to Kaiparamba panchayat. This village is on the way to Thrissur to Kunnamkulam or Guruvayoor. The name Kaiparamba means a land in the shape of a hand. Where both sides of this village is islanded by paddy fields.

Kaiparambu have two local temple one is Kaiparambu Kavu temple and another Puthoor Subramanya and Siva temple. Kaiparambu is home land for lot of self-employed transport owners, like MKK travels, PAR travels, Vijay transport diamond cutting and polishing workers, farmers. The village was a hub of diamond cutting and polishing small scale industry in kerala.

Kaiparambu stays as a high land compared to its neighboring villages Mazhuvancheri and Ezhamkallu. The "Kaiparambu Erakkam" - slope is famous for its climb which is about three-fourths of a kilometer.

== Demographics ==
As of 2011 India census, Kaiparambu had a population of 7179 with 3514 males and 3665 females.

== Geography ==
Kaiparamba is a village located in Thrissur district of Kerala, India. It lies approximately 14 km north of Thrissur city and is situated along routes connecting Thrissur with Kunnamkulam and Guruvayur. The area is characterised by paddy fields and semi-urban residential development.

== History ==
Kaiparamba is a traditional agrarian settlement with a history linked to paddy cultivation and local trade routes in central Kerala. The region developed around small farming communities and temple-centred social structures.

During the 20th century, the village experienced socio-economic changes due to expansion of education, migration to urban centres, and overseas employment, particularly to Gulf countries, contributing to improved living standards.

== Local governance ==
Kaiparamba is governed by the Kaiparamba Gram Panchayat, which functions under the Puzhakkal Block Panchayat in Thrissur district. The panchayat is responsible for civic administration, including sanitation, local roads, and welfare programmes.

== Economy ==
The economy of Kaiparamba is a mix of agriculture, small-scale enterprises, and service-sector employment. Paddy cultivation remains a traditional occupation, although its importance has declined over time.

A significant proportion of residents are employed in nearby urban centres such as Thrissur or work overseas, particularly in Gulf countries, contributing to remittance-driven income.

== Agriculture ==
Agriculture has traditionally been a key component of Kaiparamba’s economy, with paddy cultivation dominating the surrounding fields.

Other crops such as coconut, banana, and vegetables are also cultivated on a smaller scale.

== Education ==
Kaiparamba and its surrounding areas are served by a mix of government, aided, and private educational institutions, reflecting Kerala’s well-developed public education system. Schools in nearby localities such as Anjur, Kechery, and Parappur provide access to primary and secondary education.

The region includes institutions affiliated with both the Kerala State syllabus and national boards such as the Central Board of Secondary Education (CBSE). Notable schools in the vicinity include Nirmal Jyothi Central School (CBSE), St. George's Higher Secondary School, Salsabeel Green School, Mambaul Huda English School, and St. John's Higher Secondary School, Parappur.

For technical and professional education, Kaiparamba is home to the Vidya Academy of Science and Technology, an engineering college offering undergraduate and postgraduate programmes in engineering and technology.

Students also access higher education institutions in nearby Thrissur, a major academic hub in Kerala. Prominent institutions include the Kerala Agricultural University, St. Thomas College, Thrissur, and Sree Kerala Varma College, which offer programmes across science, arts, commerce, and research disciplines.

The high literacy rate in the region reflects Kerala’s emphasis on universal education, supported by widespread access to schooling and higher education opportunities.

== Healthcare ==
Healthcare services in Kaiparamba are delivered through a combination of local primary care facilities and access to major hospitals in nearby urban centres. Basic healthcare needs are met through government primary health centres and private clinics serving the village and surrounding areas.

For secondary and tertiary medical care, residents primarily depend on healthcare institutions in Thrissur, which serves as a major healthcare hub in central Kerala. Key public institutions include the Government Medical College, Thrissur, which provides specialised treatment, emergency care, and referral services for the district.

The region is supported by Kerala’s extensive public healthcare system, which includes a network of primary health centres, community health centres, and district hospitals. State-run initiatives such as Arogya Keralam focus on preventive healthcare, maternal and child health services, and disease control programmes.

In addition to public healthcare facilities, private hospitals and speciality centres in Thrissur provide advanced diagnostic and treatment services, complementing the government healthcare infrastructure.

The healthcare access available to residents reflects the broader strengths of Kerala’s health system, including high accessibility, strong public health initiatives, and a well-integrated referral network between primary and tertiary care.

== Culture ==
The cultural life of Kaiparamba reflects traditional Kerala practices, including temple festivals and community events.

Nearby major cultural and religious centres include Guruvayur Temple and Paramekkavu Bhagavathy Temple, while festivals such as Thrissur Pooram are widely celebrated in the region.

== Infrastructure and transport ==
Kaiparamba is well connected by road to major towns such as Thrissur, Kunnamkulam, and Guruvayur. Public transport services operate regularly in the area.

The nearest railway station is Thrissur railway station, and the nearest airport is Cochin International Airport, located approximately 50 km away.

== Politics ==
Kaiparamba falls under the Thrissur Lok Sabha constituency and the Manalur Assembly constituency. The region participates actively in Kerala’s electoral politics, with representation from major political alliances including the Left Democratic Front (LDF) and the United Democratic Front (UDF).
