= Kuttur (Thrissur) =

Kuttoor Kuttoor
- Census Town
- Nickname: കുറ്റൂർ
- Location of Kuttur (CT) in Kerala, India Kuttoor (India)
- Coordinates: 10°33′47″N 76°11′42″E
- Country: India
- State: Kerala
- District: Thrissur district

Government
  - Body: Kolazhy Grama Panchayath, Thrissur Corporation, Avannoor Grama Panchayath

Population (2011)
  - Total: 12,179

Languages
  - Official: Malayalam, English
- Time zone: UTC+5:30 (IST)
- Vehicle registration: KL-08

Kuttur, also known as Kuttoor, is a census town in Thrissur district in the Indian state of Kerala. Kuttur is located 5–8 km from Thrissur town and is part of Kolazhy Grama Panchayat.

== Demographics ==
As of 2011 India census, Kuttur (CT) had a population of 12179.
