= Avitanallur =

- village
- Location in Kerala, India Avitanallur (India)
- Coordinates: 11°29′13.661″N 75°49′28.03″E
- Country: India
- State: Kerala
- District: Kozhikode

Population (2011)
  - Total: 18,378

Languages
  - Official: Malayalam, English
- Time zone: UTC+5:30 (IST)
- PIN: 673614
- Vehicle registration: KL-

Avitanallur is a village in Kozhikode district in the state of Kerala, India. Avitanallur has been made famous by the birth of N. N. Kakkad, the famous Malayalam Poet. While Avitanallur is the official name of the village, it is locally renowned and directed as Kootallida.

The place name (Avita-Nalla-uur) in Malayalam means "That is a good place". This small village had nearly 300 Illams (Brahmin House) in which most of them was attacked and looted during Mysorean invasion of Malabar.

== Demographics ==
At the 2011 India census, Avitanallur had a population of 18,378 with 8,651 males and 9,727 females.

== Transportation ==
Avitanallur village connects to other parts of India through Koyilandy town. The nearest airports are at Kannur and Kozhikode. The nearest railway station is at Koyilandy. The national highway no.66 passes through Koyilandy and the northern stretch connects to Mangalore, Goa and Mumbai. The southern stretch connects to Cochin and Trivandrum. The eastern National Highway No.54 going through Kuttiady connects to Mananthavady, Mysore and Bangalore.
