= Vivekodayam Boys Higher Secondary School =

Coordinates: 10.5286°N 76.2101°E

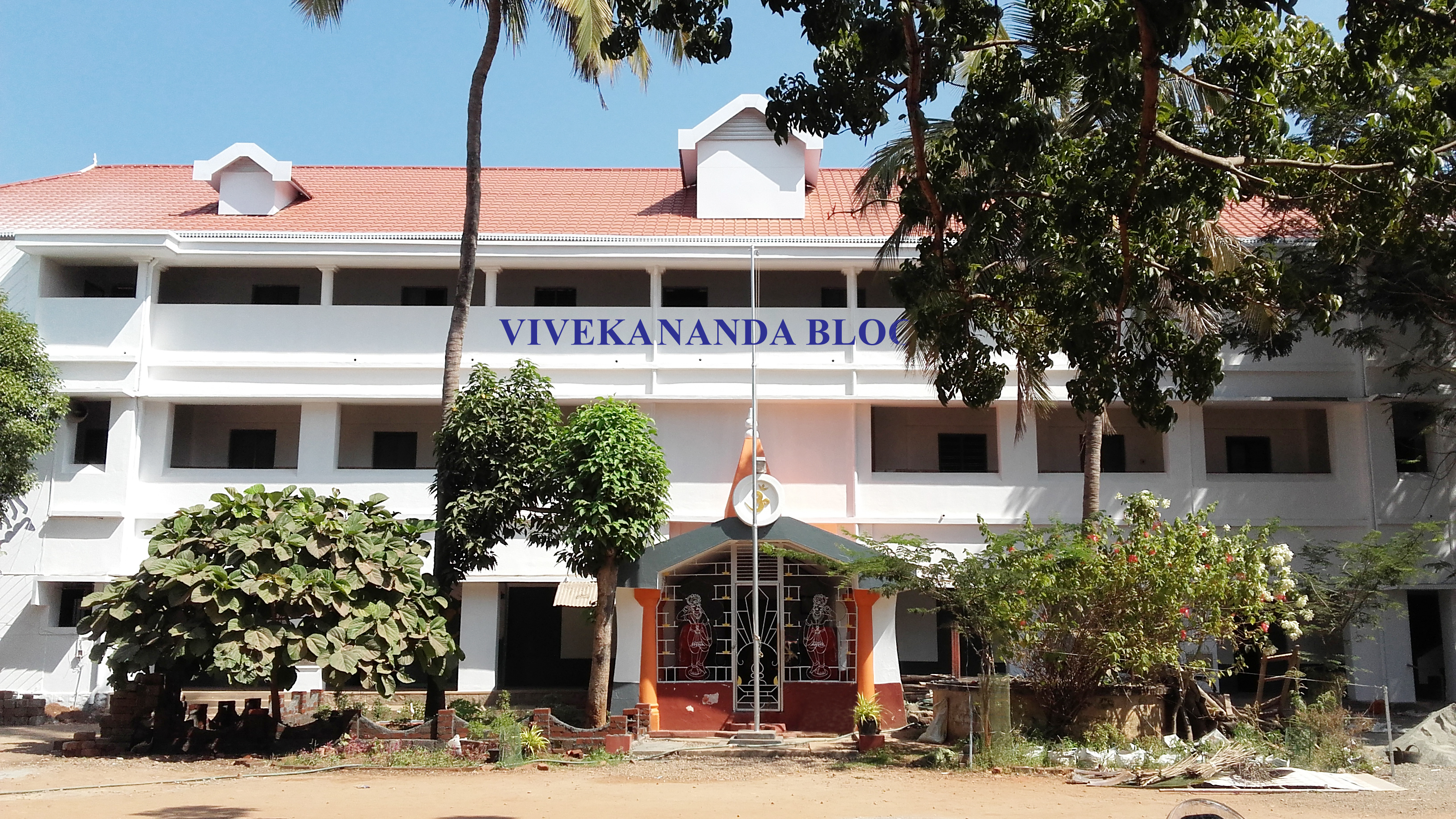
- Thrissur City, Kerala; India

Information
- Type: Higher Secondary, Mixed
- Established: 1917, Vivekodayam Samajom
- President: K Madhavanunni
- Principal: Venugopalan N
- Affiliation: Department of General Education, Kerala.
- Website: vivekodayamschool.in

Vivekodayam Boys Higher Secondary School (V.B.H.S.S) is an aided school in Naikkanal, near Thrissur Town, Kerala, India. The school was established by Vivekodayam Samajom under the leadership of Rama Varma Appan Thampuran in 1917. Now, Therambil Ramakrishnan is the manager of the school.

== History ==
The school was founded through the inspiration of Vivekananda. A group of devout youths from Thrissur founded an organization called the Vivekodayam Samajom in 1917 for the reminiscence of Vivekananda. They founded a primary school named Vivekodayam School to realize the mission of the Samajom. Later, the school was split into two high schools for boys and girls. On 14 October 1927, Mahatma Gandhi visited the school and wrote his comments in the visitors' book. The luminaries of the school, like Chinmayananda Saraswati, the founder of Chinmaya Mission and Swami Ranganathananda, the president of Ramakrishna Math, have expressed their indebtedness to the school for shaping their destiny.

== Notable alumni ==
- Swami Chinmayananda
- Swami Ranganathananda
- Malavika Nair
- Sathish Kalathil
- N. N. Kakkad
- V M Sudheeran
- Trichur V. Ramachandran
- M. R. Chandrasekharan, professor
- Sundar Menon
