= V. Balram =

Indian politician (1947–2020)

Kerala Legislative Assembly
- In office 1996–2004
- Preceded by: K. S. Narayanan Namboodir
- Succeeded by: A. C. Moideen
- Constituency: Wadakkanchery

Personal details
- Born: 10 November 1947
- Died: 18 January 2020 (aged 72)
- Political party: Indian National Congress

Adv. Vellur Balram (also written as V. Balaram; 10 November 1947 – 18 January 2020) was an Indian lawyer and politician from Kerala belonging to Indian National Congress who was the general secretary of the Kerala Pradesh Congress Committee. He was elected as a member of the Kerala Legislative Assembly from Wadakkanchery in 1996 and 2001.

== Biography ==
Balram was born on 10 November 1947 to T. Raman Nair and Vellur Chinnammu Amma in the temple town of Guruvayur, then a part of Malabar district in Madras State. His father hailed from Erumapetty in the then Kingdom of Cochin. He was also the nephew of Vellur Krishnankutty Nair, an Indian Independence Activist and lawyer. He was the general secretary of the Kerala Pradesh Congress Committee.

Balram was elected as a member of the Kerala Legislative Assembly from Wadakkanchery in 1996. He was also elected from this constituency in 2001. He resigned from his legislator post in 2004. K. Muraleedharan contested from his assembly constituency in bypoll and he contested from Kozhikode in Lok Sabha Election 2004. Both of them lost in the elections.

Balram was married to Kanchanamala. They had two daughters. The names of their two daughters are Deepa and Laxmi.

Balram died on 18 January 2020 at the age of 72.
