= Nalamkode =

Nalamkode Nalamcode Machad
- Village in kerala
- Location in Kerala, India Nalamkode (India)
- Coordinates: 10°37′52.8″N 76°17′36.1″E
- Country: India
- State: Kerala
- District: Thrissur

Government
  - Type: Yes

Languages
  - Official: Malayalam, English
- Time zone: UTC+5:30 (IST)
- PIN: 680589
- Vehicle registration: KL-8, KL-48
- Nearest city: Wadakkancherry
- Lok Sabha constituency: alathur
- Vidhan Sabha constituency: Wadakkanchery

Nalamkode is a village in Thrissur district in the state of Kerala, India. It is situated in the Thekkumkara Gramapachayath. The main celebration include the feast at Nalamkode Church and the Kuttikadu Kumbhakudam, which is part of the Machad Mamangam festival. One can travel through the Machad hills and the Kuttikadu forest to reach Vazhani Dam. The Nalamkode Pond and Nalamkode Hill are also notable landmarks.

== Location ==
It is located in Thekkumkara Panchayath.
