= Malakka (Kerala) =

Malakka machad
- Village
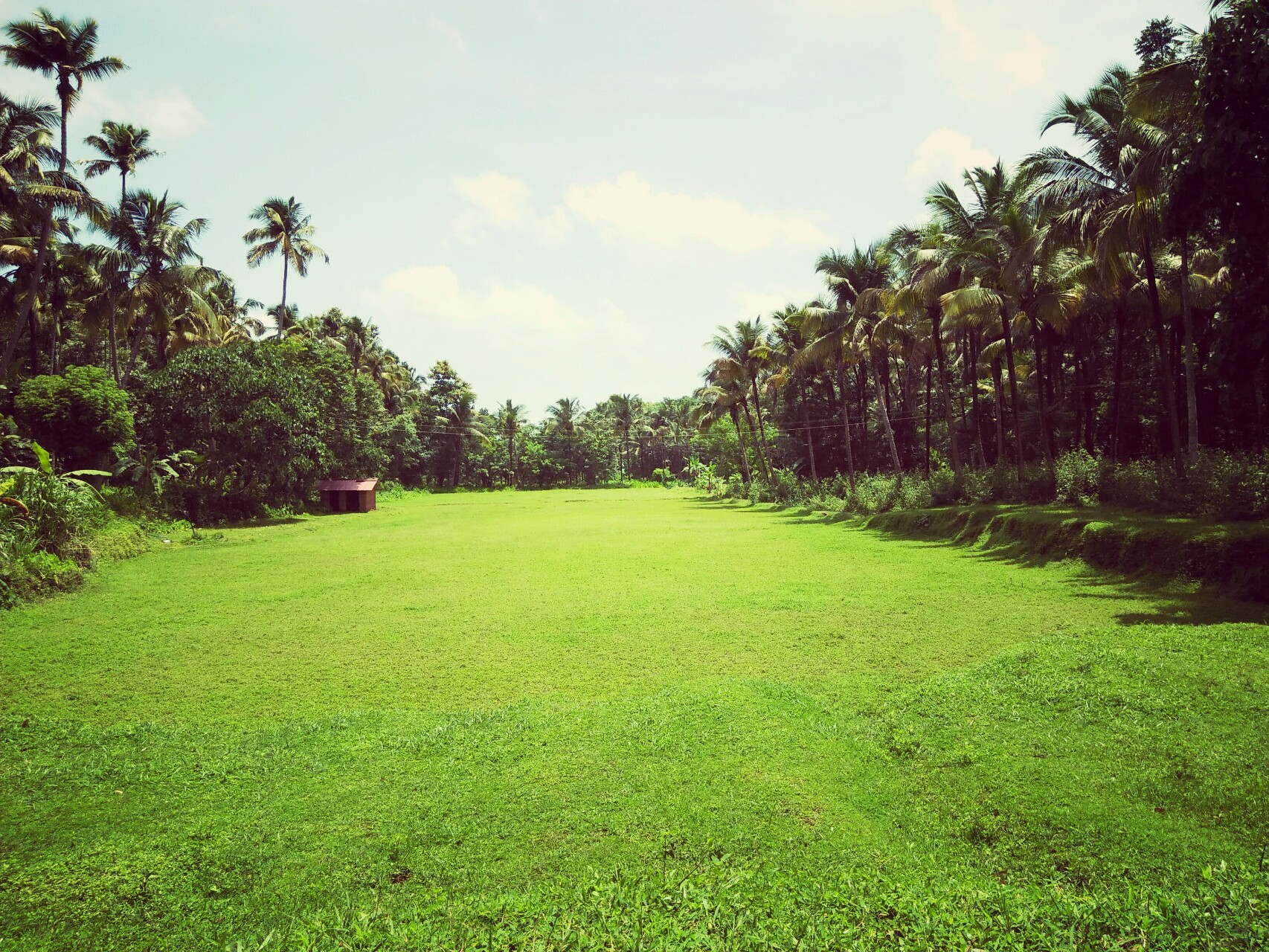

- Location in Kerala, India Malakka (India)
- Coordinates: 10°37′39.5″N 76°17′04.5″E
- Country: India
- State: Kerala
- District: Thrissur

Government
  - Type: Yes
  - Body: Panchayath

Population (2001)
  - Total: 1,000+

Languages
  - Official: Malayalam, English
- Time zone: UTC+5:30 (IST)
- PIN: 680589
- Vehicle registration: KL-8, KL-48
- Nearest city: Wadakanchery
- Lok Sabha constituency: alathur
- Vidhan Sabha constituency: wadakkanchery

Malakka is a village in Thrissur district of Kerala, India. It is located in Thekkumkara Grama Panchayath.

== Geography ==
The Village of Malakka is situated in Thrissur District of Central Kerala in India. The village is located at 10.37°N 76.17°E and has an average altitude of 2.83 metres.

== Climate ==
Under the Köppen climate classification, City of Thrissur features a tropical monsoon climate. Summer lasts from March to May which is the hottest time of the year. Summer months are uncomfortable due to higher levels of heat and humidity. Daytime temperatures can rise up to 36- 38 °C coupled with excessive humidity. Summer is followed by the south-west monsoon from June to September. October and November form the post monsoon or retreating monsoon season. Winter from December through February is cooler, and windy, due to winds from the Western Ghats. Winter months are generally dry and less humid compared to other months of the year. Morning temperatures are usually cool and daytime temperatures hover around 30 °C.
