= N. N. Kakkad =

Indian poet (1927–1987)

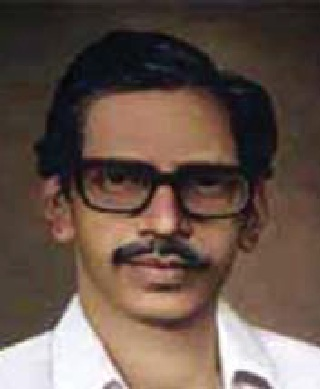
- Born: 14 July 1927; Avitanallur, British India (Kerala, India)
- Died: 6 January 1987 (aged 59)
- Occupations: Teacher, poet, essayist, translator
- Spouse: Sreedevi Kakkad
- Writing career
- Notable works: Saphalmee Yathra; Pathalathinde Muzhakkam; Changatham
- Notable awards: 1985 Odakkuzhal Award; 1985 Cherukad Award; 1986 Kerala Sahitya Akademi Award for Poetry; 1986 Vayalar Award; 1989 Asan Smaraka Kavitha Puraskaram

Narayanan Nambuthiri Kakkad (14 July 1927 – 6 January 1987), commonly known as N. N. Kakkad, was an Indian poet of the Malayalam language. Known for works such as Saphalmee Yathra, Pathalathinde Muzhakkam and Changatham, he was a Sanskrit scholar and was known to have been proficient in painting and music. He was a recipient of several awards including Odakkuzhal Award, Asan Smaraka Kavitha Puraskaram, Kerala Sahitya Akademi Award for Poetry and Vayalar Award.

== Biography ==
Kakkad was born on 14 July 1927 at Avitanallur of Kozhikode district, in the south Indian state of Kerala, in an orthodox Brahmin family to Kakkad Valiya Narayanan Namboothiri and Devaki Antharjanam. His early education was in Sanskrit in the traditional way and he also studied painting, classical music and flute. It was only at the age of 16, he could start his formal education which at the 6th standard and in 1943, he joined the Zamorin's High School, Kozhikode in 7th standard. Two years later, he moved to Vivekodayam High School from where he completed schooling and joined Sree Kerala Varma College in 1948, where he had the opportunity to study under N. V. Krishna Warrier, the noted poet and scholar, who nurtured his literary skills. After earning the graduate degree of BOL, he started his career as a teacher at Naduvannur High School but his tenure there was short-lived as he resigned following a dispute with the school management to move to a tutorial college in Kozhikode. Later, he switched to broadcasting by joining the Kozhikode station of the All India Radio as a script writer and spent the rest of his career there to superannuate in 1985 as a producer.

Kakkad was married to Sreedevi, the marriage taking place on 25 April 1955. He died on 6 January 1987, at the age of 59, succumbing to cancer.

== Career ==
He started writing poetry during his school days. His first book, Salabha Geetham, appeared in 1957, followed by ten other books of poetry and three essay compilations. He is considered by many critics as a pioneer of avant-garde poetry in Malayalam and as one of the founders of modernist movement in Malayalam literature. Kanwan and Nineteen Sixty Three, published in Mathrubhumi weekly in early 1960s revealed Eliotean influence and established him as a modern poet. Saphalamee Yathra, which fetched him a number of awards and considered by many as his magnum opus was published in 1985. Two of his works, Nadan Chinthukal and Pakalaruthikku Munpu, were published after his death.

Kakkad was also involved in politics, starting as a member of the Indian National Congress but later, moving to the Communist Party of India. He unsuccessfully contested the Malabar District Board elections from Balussery under the Communist banner and was an office bearer of the All India Radio Staff Association. He also sat in the councils of Kerala Sahitya Akademi, Kerala Sahitya Samithi, Vallathol Vidyapeedam, Sahitya Pravarthaka Sahakarana Sangham.

== Awards and honours ==
Kakkad received the Odakkuzhal Award in 1985 for his work, Saphalamee Yathra; and the Cherukad Award for the poetry anthology, Kavitha, the same year. Kerala Sahitya Akademi selected Saphalamee Yathra for their annual award for poetry in 1986 and he received one more award in 1986, the Vayalar Award, Saphalamee Yathra again fetching him the honour. He received the 1989 Asan Smaraka Kavitha Puraskaram as a posthumous honor.

== Works ==
=== Poetry ===
- Kakkad, N. N. (1957). Salaba Geetham (1 ed.). Thrissur: Current Books.
- N. N. Kakkad. Agniradham. Kozhikode: Poorna Publications. p. 224. ISBN 978-8130008295.
- N. N. Kakkad (1971). Pathalathinte Muzhakkam. Sāhityapr̲avartaka Sahakaraṇasaṅghaṃ.
- Kakkad, N. N. Vajrakundalam. Kottayam: National Book Stall.
- N. N. Kakkad (1985). Saphalamee Yathra. Kochi: Mathrubhumi Books. ISBN 8182648726. ASIN 8182648726.
- Kakkad, N. N. (1980). Kavitha.
- Kakkad, N. N. Nanni Thiruvoname Nanni.
- Kakkad. N. N (1970). Ayirathi thollayirathi Arupathi moonnu. Poorna publications: Poorna publications.
- N. N.Kakkad (1986). Itha Ashramamrugam Kollu, Kollu. Payyannur: BR Book Publishers.
- Kakkad, N. N. Pakalaruthikku Munpu.
- N N Kakkad (1987). Nadan chinthukal. Malayalam Publication, Kozhikode: Malayalam Publication, Kozhikode.
- Kakkad, N. N. Kachacharitham (Kalam[pattu).
- Kakkad, N. N. Kachavrutham.
- Kakkad, N. N. Sishyanaya Guru.
- N. N. Kakkad (2002). Kakkadinte Krithikal. Current Books. p. 591.
- N. N. Kakkad (2011). Kakkadinte Kavithakal. Kochi: Mathrubhumi Books. ISBN 978-8182650862.

=== Essays ===
- Kakkadu, N. N. (1986). Avalokanam. Kottayam, SPCS.
- N. N.Kakkad (1984). Kavithayum Paramparyavum. Vallathol Vidyapeedam. p. 98.
- Kakkad, N. N. Saparivaram Poojakal.

== See also ==
- List of Malayalam-language authors by category
- List of Malayalam-language authors
