= Killannur Census Town =

Killannur Census Town Killannur (CT)
- Census Town
- Interactive map of Killannur Census Town
- Country: India
- State: Kerala
- District: Thrissur

Population (2011)
  - Total: 20,339

Languages
  - Official: Malayalam
- Time zone: UTC+5:30 (IST)
- PIN: 6XXXXX
- Vehicle registration: KL-

Killannur (CT) is a census town in Thrissur district in the state of Kerala, India.

It comprises all the wards in Mulakunnathukavu Grama Panchayat and a small number of wards from Madakkathara Grama Panchayat

== Demographics ==
As of 2011 India census, Killannur had a population of 20339 with 9910 males and 10429 females.
