= List of revenue divisions of Kerala =

The State of Kerala consists of 14 districts, which are further divided into 27 revenue divisions.

A revenue division is positioned below the district and encompasses several taluks within its administrative purview. Each revenue division is headed by a Revenue Divisional Officer (RDO), who may be a Sub-Collector from the IAS cadre or a Deputy Collector from the state service. The RDO also functions as the Sub-divisional magistrate and assisted by Senior Superintendent among others.

Revenue divisions are subdivisions of districts under the Revenue Department.

Administrative map of Kerala

The below table details the 27 revenue divisions with respect to their districts.

District	No. of Divisions	Revenue Divisions (RDO)	Taluks under RDO	Formed on	Ref
Kasaragod	2	Kasaragod	Manjeshwaram (HQ: Uppala), Kasaragod	26 May 2018	
Kasaragod	2	Kanhangad	Vellarikundu, Hosdurg (HQ: Kanhangad)	24 May 1984	
Kannur	2	Taliparamba	Payyanur, Taliparamba, Kannur	March 2019	
Kannur	2	Thalassery	Thalassery, Iritty	1 January 1957	
Wayanad	1	Mananthavady	Mananthavady, Sulthan Bathery, Vythiri (HQ: Kalpetta)	1 November 1980	
Kozhikode	2	Vatakara	Vatakara, Koyilandy	May 2018	
Kozhikode	2	Kozhikode	Thamarassery, Kozhikode	1 January 1957	
Malappuram	2	Perinthalmanna	Nilambur, Eranad (HQ: Manjeri), Perinthalmanna	16 June 1969	
Malappuram	2	Tirur	Kondotty, Tirurangadi, Tirur, Ponnani	16 June 1969	
Palakkad	2	Ottappalam	Pattambi, Ottappalam, Mannarkkad, Attappady (HQ: Agali)	1 January 1957	
Palakkad	2	Palakkad	Palakkad, Chittur, Alathur	1 January 1957	
Thrissur	2	Thrissur	Thalapilly (HQ: Wadakkancheri), Kunnamkulam, Chavakkad, Thrissur	1 November 1956	
Thrissur	2	Irinjalakuda	Kodungallur, Mukundapuram (HQ: Irinjalakuda), Chalakudy	31 May 2018	
Ernakulam	2	Fort Kochi	Kanayannur (HQ: Ernakulam), Kochi (HQ: Fort Kochi), North Paravur, Aluva	1 April 1958	
Ernakulam	2	Muvattupuzha	Kothamangalam, Muvattupuzha, Kunnathunad (HQ: Perumbavoor)	1 April 1958	
Idukki	2	Devikulam	Peermade, Udumbanchola (HQ: Nedumkandam), Devikulam	1909	
Idukki	2	Idukki	Idukki (HQ: Painavu), Thodupuzha	16 January 1972	
Kottayam	2	Kottayam	Changanasserry, Kottayam, Kanjirappally	1868	
Kottayam	2	Palai	Meenachil (HQ: Pala), Vaikom	1 July 1949	
Alappuzha	2	Chengannur	Chengannur, Mavelikkara, Karthikappally (HQ: Haripad)	17 August 1957	
Alappuzha	2	Alappuzha	Kuttanad (HQ: Mankombu), Ambalappuzha (HQ: Alappuzha), Cherthala	17 August 1957	
Pathanamthitta	2	Adoor	Adoor, Konni, Kozhencherry (HQ: Pathanamthitta)	9 June 1983	
Pathanamthitta	2	Thiruvalla	Ranni, Mallappally, Thiruvalla	1 November 1956	
Kollam	2	Kollam	Kollam, Kunnathoor (HQ: Sasthamcotta), Karunagappally	1868	
Kollam	2	Punalur	Punalur, Pathanapuram, Kottarakkara	1 November 2018	
Thiruvananthapuram	2	Thiruvananthapuram	Thiruvananthapuram, Chirayinkeezhu (HQ: Attingal), Varkala, Neyyattinkara	1 July 1949	
Thiruvananthapuram	2	Nedumangad	Kattakkada, Nedumangad	30 April 2018	

== Bibliography ==
- Chandran, VP (2018). Mathrubhumi Yearbook Plus - 2019 (Malayalam ed.). Kozhikode: P. V. Chandran, Managing Editor, Mathrubhumi Printing & Publishing Company Limited, Kozhikode.
