= Anil Akkara =

Indian politician (born 1972)

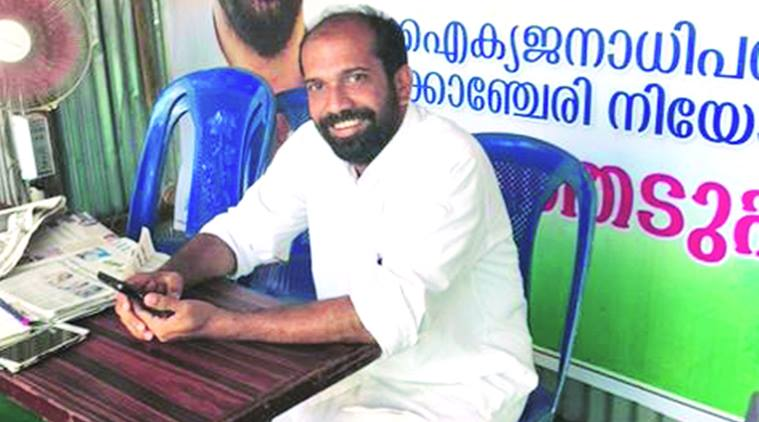

Member of Legislative Assembly, Wadakkancherry, Kerala
- In office 2016–2021
- Preceded by: C. N. Balakrishnan
- Succeeded by: Xavier Chittilappilly
- Constituency: Wadakkancherry

Personal details
- Party: Indian National Congress

Anil Akkara (born 1972) is an Indian politician of the Indian National Congress, social worker and farmer from Kerala, India. He represented the Wadakkancherry constituency in Kerala Legislative Assembly.

== Political career ==
He was elected to the Kerala Legislative Assembly from the Wadakkancherry assembly constituency in 2016 Kerala Legislative Assembly election by defeating Mary Thomas of CPI(M) by a margin of 43 votes, one of the shortest margins of a winning candidate in the elections. Anil Akkara was defeated by Xavier Chittilappilly LDF Candidate in 2021 Kerala Legislative Assembly election with a vote margin of 15,168 votes.

== Initiatives ==
During his tenure as President of Adat grama panchayath, Akkara has transformed the village with organic farming and sanitation initiatives. Every household in Adat, which has a population of 40,000, gets drinking water, is self-reliant in agriculture, has its own brand of organic rice and coconut oil, and owns a "tourism village". Adat Panchayat has won several awards including Panchayat Sashaktikaran Puraskar of the Central government and the state's Swaraj Award for an ideal panchayat.
