= Government Medical College, Thrissur =

College in Kerala, India

- Type: Government
- Established: 1981; 45 years ago
- Affiliations: Kerala University of Health Sciences
- Principal: Dr. Indu P. S.
- Location: Medical College, M.G. Kavu., Thrissur, Kerala, India; 10.6165°N 76.1984°E
- Administration: Department of Health and Family Welfare, Government of Kerala
- Nickname: TMC
- Mascot: Dr. Appu
- Website: gmctcr.kerala.gov.in

Government Medical College Thrissur (also known colloquially as Thrissur Medical College) is a government medical school situated in the city of Thrissur in the Indian state of Kerala.

Established in 1982, it is the fifth oldest medical college in the state and the fourth most popular choice for medical undergraduate students in the state. With newly constructed massive Mother and Child block and superspeciality block it becomes kerala third biggest medical college, known historically for the quality of care given comparable to much praised two private medical college in Thrissur district.

It is affiliated to the Kerala University of Health Sciences which itself began functioning in the campus in 2009.

Spread over an area of more than 250 acres (100 ha), it is located in the serene surroundings of Mulagunnathukavu (M.G. Kavu) 14 kilometres (8.7 mi) away from Thrissur downtown. The college was selected as the best medical college in Kerala by the Swasthya conference 2021.

== History ==
The college was inaugurated on 1 April 1982 by the Governor of Kerala, Jyothi Vencatachellum, who had also laid the foundation stone for the proposed college building at Mulagunnathukavu on 30 April 1982. Thrissur Medical College had its humble beginning at Mannuthy. By March 1983, the institution had moved to its permanent site at Mulamgunnathukavu, where the old buildings of the T.B. sanatorium were modified to accommodate the pre-clinical and the para-clinical departments as well as the administrative block.

The old Medical College building, which is currently the District hospital

The clinical departments started functioning on 22 October 1983 in the erstwhile District Hospital & Maternity Hospital buildings in Thrissur City. On 1 April 1985, the entire District Hospital was taken over. Construction of the 300 bedded Medical College Chest Hospital at Mulamgunnathukavu was completed in 1987. The primary health centre of Tholur was taken over by the college in 1986, for regular training of medical students in community and preventive care. Ollur and Erumappetty primary health centres were also made available for training purposes. Construction of the 400-bed new medical college hospital was started in 1995.

The first class of 74 students was admitted to the college in April 1982 who completed their course in the May 1987. The college was granted permanent recognition by IMC in 1991 and by WHO in 1993. In January 1995 construction of a new hospital complex was started in M.G Kavu. MD Radiodiagnosis courses were started in 1997 & MD general medicine courses were started in 2004.

In 2005 December the clinical departments were shifted from District Hospital to the New Medical College Hospital Complex in Mulagunnathukavu. The college celebrated its Silver Jubilee in the year 2007.

== Principals ==
Principal	Year		
Dr. C.V. Korah	18 February 1983 to 31 May 1983		
Dr. N. Sarada Devi	1 June 1983 to 1 September 1984		
Dr. Aysha Guharaj	1 September 1984 to 4 July 1985		
Dr. V. Kanthaswamy	4 July 1985 to 7 October 1987		
Dr. Nirmala Devi (Vice Principal-in-charge)	8 October 1987 to 4 November 1987		
Dr. Saramma Joseph	5 November 1987 to 3 April 1990		
Dr. N. Nirmala Devi	11 April 1990 to 15 July 1992		
Dr. D. M. Vasudevan (Vice Principal-in-charge)	16 July 1992 to 15 May 1993		
Dr. James T. Antony	16 May 1993 to 30 June 1994		
Dr. D. M. Vasudevan (Vice Principal-in-charge)	24 September 1995 to 19 November 1995		
Dr. T. Chandrasekaran Nair	20 November 1995 to 30 April 1998		
Dr. V.K. Ramankutty (Vice Principal-in-charge)	1 May 1998 to 23 September 1998		
Dr. K. Madan Mohan	24 September 1998 to 25 October 1999		
Dr. V.K. Ramankutty (Vice Principal-in-charge)	26 October 1999 to 30 April 2001		
Dr. M.R. Chandran	4 May 2001 to 21 July 2001		
Dr. Madhavi Ramachandaen	27 March 2002 to 31 May 2002		
Dr. M.Lilly	18 July 2002 to 28 February 2003	Dr. Bhagavathy Ammai	1 September 2004 to 31 May 2005
Dr. Aliama Fenn	30 July 2005 to 30 April 2006		
Dr. Rajaram .N Vice Principal In-charge	30 April 2006 to 25 June 2006	Dr M J Cyriac	25 June/2006 to 30 April 2007
Dr. A Remla Beevi	1 May 2007 to 30 September 2007		
Dr. K.Praveenlal	1 October 2007 to 15 November 2011		
Dr.K.R.Girija (in-charge)	16 November 2011		

== Constitution and working of the college ==
Government Medical College, Thrissur is under the Directorate of Medical Education, Government of Kerala.

The academic year extends from June to April/May. The college remains closed on Sundays, gazetted holidays and such other holidays as may be notified by the government.

== Courses conducted ==
As of October 2009

Name of course	No of seats
MBBS	175
MD and MS Post Graduate courses	Various specialities
DM & MCH Super Speciality courses	Cardiology, Neurosurgery
Senior house surgeoncy	Various specialities
BSc. Nursing	60
Diploma course in Medical Lab. Technology (MLT)	35
Certified Radiol. Assistant's (CRA) Course	35
Ophthalmic Assistant's Course	25

== Achievements ==
- Mammography with stereotactic biopsy – first sophisticated mammography system installed in India.
- H.P.L.C – First of its kind to be installed in Medical Colleges of Kerala.
- CT – Second spiral CT scanner installed in Kerala.
- I.I.T.V. (Image Intensifier Tele Vision fluoroscopy) system in CT block.
- New ventilator for Medical College Chest Hospital.
- V-Sat with medlar facility in the library – first unit installed in Medical Colleges of Kerala.

=== Non-academic ===
- Champions of 21st All Kerala Inter-Medicos youth festival held at Government Medical College, Thrissur in 2003.
- Second prize in 22nd All Kerala Inter-Medicos youth festival held at Government Medical College Calicut in 2004.
- Second prize in 23rd All Kerala Inter-Medicos youth festival held at Government Medical College Trivandrum in 2005
- Champions of 26th All Kerala Intermedicos Fest held at Pariyaram Medical College in March 2010
- First prize in State-level Inter-collegiate Youth Festival held as part of the silver jubilee celebrations of Government Medical College, Thrissur in November 2006
- Second prize in Arts in 22nd All Kerala Inter-Medicos Festival held at Government Medical College, Kottayam.
- 1st prize for quiz in ULTIMATE 2008 held at T D Medical college, Allepey
- 2nd prize for quiz at MA college Kothamangalam & Adi Shankara College, Kalady
- 3rd prize for quiz at P S Varrier Ayurveda College, Kottakal

== Campus ==
New Medical college hospital, MG Kavu

The Temple situated in the campus

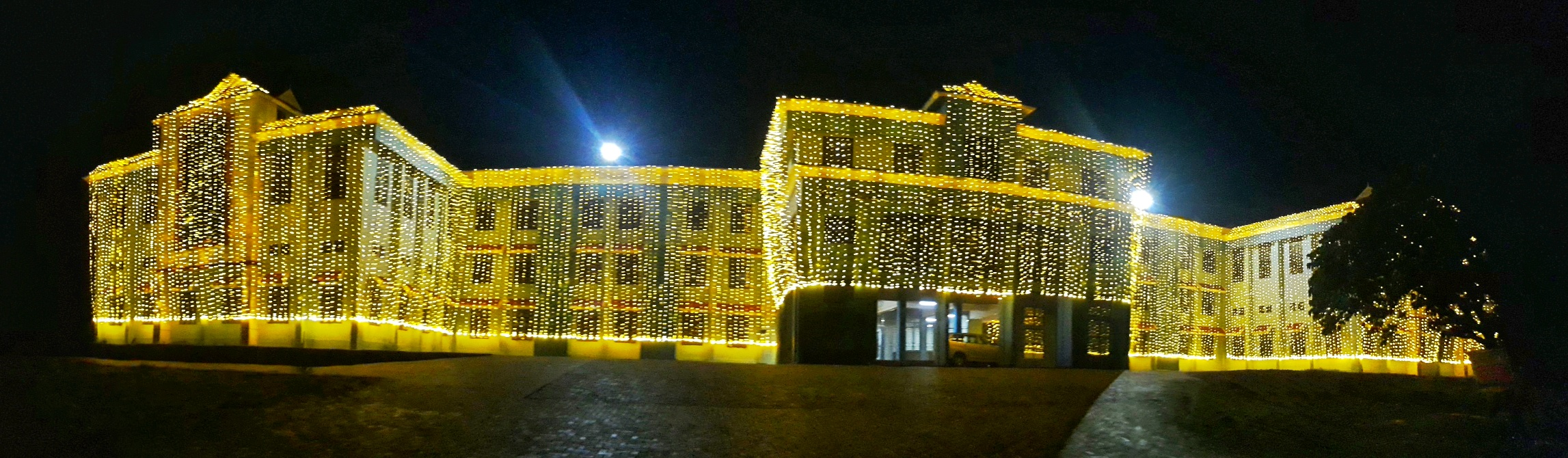
2012 MBBS Batch Graduation

Medical College Establishments

- Medical College Administrative office, Pre-clinical & Para clinical departments including Mortuary & Office of Police Surgeon.
- New Medical College Hospital.
- Medical College Chest Hospital.
- Men's and women's hostel.
- Library.
- Canteens
- Post office and employees co-operative store.
- P.W.D (spl.buildings) section, S.B.T (Extn.counter)
- PWD Electrical wing section and substation
- 800 bedded extension of new Medical College Hospital complex.
- Teletherapy building.
- Museum block for forensic medicine.
- Lecture halls.
- TMCAA Sports complex

.
Attached institutions outside the campus

- Health centre
1. Rural: Tholur, Pambur & Erumappetty.
2. Urban: Urban Community Health Centre, Kizhakkumbattukara. (in collaboration with Thrissur Corporation)

In addition there is an auditorium located deep inside the campus which hosts the Annual inter-batch youth festivals. There is a small temple in the campus. The three canteens in the campus are run by the Indian Coffee House. The non-clinical departments are situated as separate buildings inside the campus.

== Alumni association ==
Thrissur Medical College Alumni Association (TMCAA) is an organisation of the past and present students of Govt.Medical College, Thrissur and the teachers who served as faculty in this institution. As per the byelaw, this organisation is committed to the academic and infrastructural development of the alma mater. TMCAA conducts the famous CME programme for orientation for junior doctors for career advancement, helping doctors all over Kerala to get through the post-graduate MD/MS entrance examinations.

TMCAA have also provided teaching materials, audio visual equipment, furniture, computers, academic bulletin board, surgical instruments, instruments for pre-clinical medical training, high quality Histology teaching slides, medical journals and books, TVs, chairs, scanners and printers & LCD projectors to various departments.

TMCCA have also contributed in computerisation of MCCH out patient dept, beautification of the campus (by sponsoring planting of trees in MCCH), co sponsoring academic meetings and art festivals, co-sponsoring the 31st Inter-medical youth festival, felicitating our retiring teachers, hosting a web Site useful for the institution, supporting various academic activities of the students, reprographic services for PGs, departments administration, supporting water supply scheme of the college campus, supporting background work in IMC inspections, silver jubilee celebrations, working as a catalyst in various situations where administrative bottle necks affects the development of the alma mater and providing financial support for students.

The Thrissur Medical College Alumni Association built and donated an Academic Complex in the year 2009, at an approximate cost of Rs. 16 million. The complex consists of one Convocation Hall of 1000 seating capacity, three Seminar Halls of 200 seats, an Electronic Library and a two Food Courts. The entire complex is air conditioned, and now serves as the nerve center of academic activities. The TMCAA has also built and donated an Indoor Stadium cum Examination Hall at a cost of Rs. 55 million, after signing a Memorandum of Understanding with the Government of Kerala for this purpose.

== Notable alumni ==
- Dr.Niji Justin, Mayor Thrissur Municipal Corporation

== Popular culture ==
- Abraham Ozler

== See also ==
- List of medical colleges in India
- AIIMS
- JIPMER
- PGIMER Chandigarh
- CMC Vellore
- Azeezia Medical College
- Government T D Medical College, Alappuzha
- Government Medical College, Kozhikode
- Government Medical College, Thiruvananthapuram
