= Thirumukkulam =

Village in Kerala, India

- village
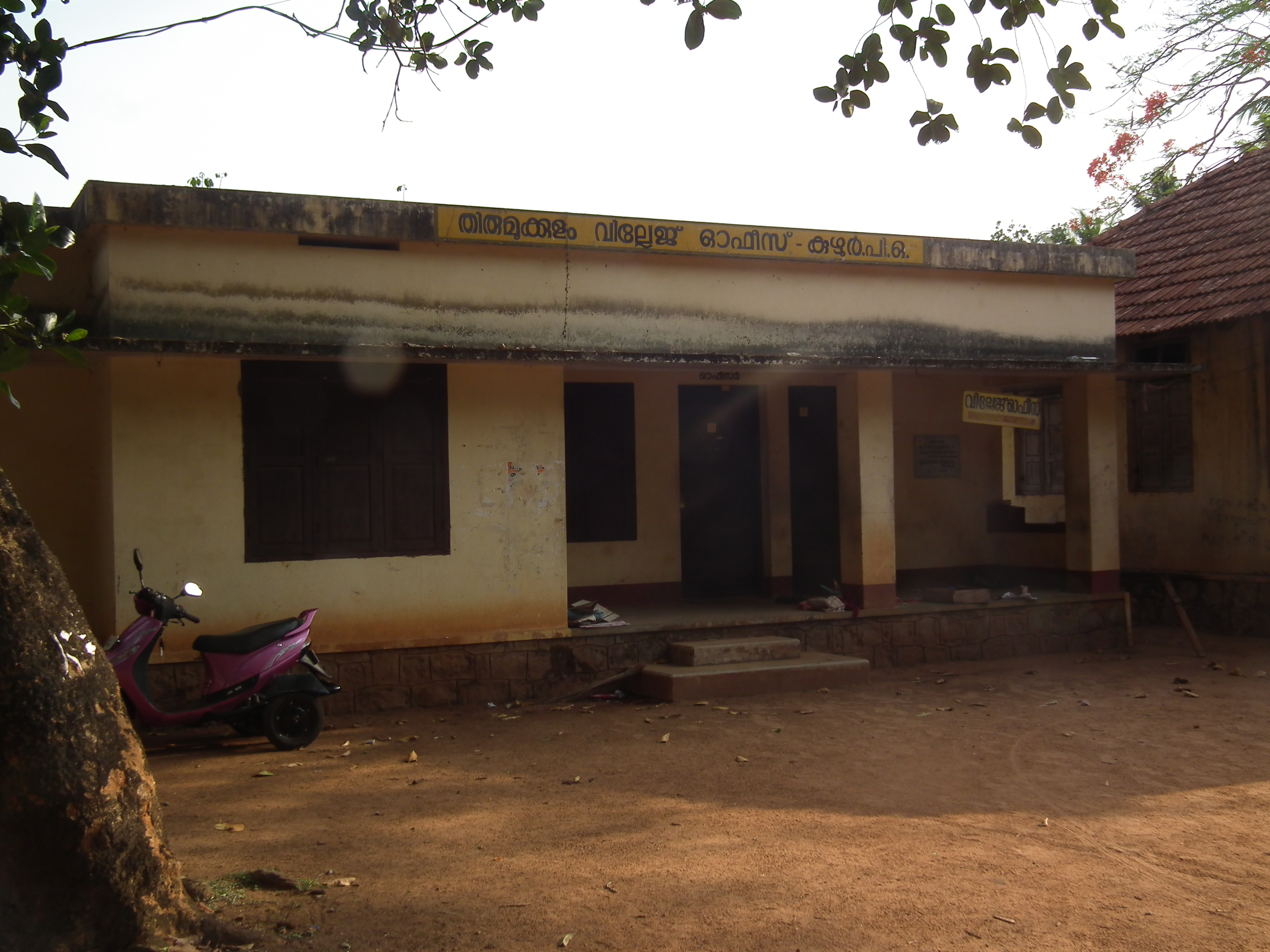
- Thirumukkulam Village office situated in Kuzhur
- Country: India
- State: Kerala
- District: Thrissur

Population (2011)
  - Total: 9,468

Languages
  - Official: Malayalam, English
- Time zone: UTC+5:30 (IST)
- PIN: 6XXXXX
- Vehicle registration: KL-

Thirumukkulam is a village in Thrissur district in the state of Kerala, India.

== Demographics ==
According to the 2011 India census, Thirumukkulam had a population of 9,468 with 4,540 males and 4,928 females.
