= Pottore, Thrissur =

Pottore (CT)
- Census town
- Location in Kerala, India
- Coordinates: 10.5916927°N 76.203096°E
- Country: India
- State: Kerala
- District: Thrissur

Population (2001)
  - Total: 8,210

Languages
  - Official: Malayalam, English
- Time zone: UTC+5:30 (IST)

Pottore (CT) is a census town in Thrissur district in the Indian state of Kerala. Pottore is located 7–8 km from Thrissur town and is part of Kolazhy Grama Panchayat. Its approximate location is 10°34'25"N, 76°12'25"E

== Demographics ==
At the 2001 India census, Pottore had a population of 8210. Males constituted 49% of the population and females 51%. Pottore had an average literacy rate of 85%, higher than the national average of 59.5%: male literacy was 86% and female literacy was 84%.

10% of the population was under 6 years of age.
