= Avanur =

- village
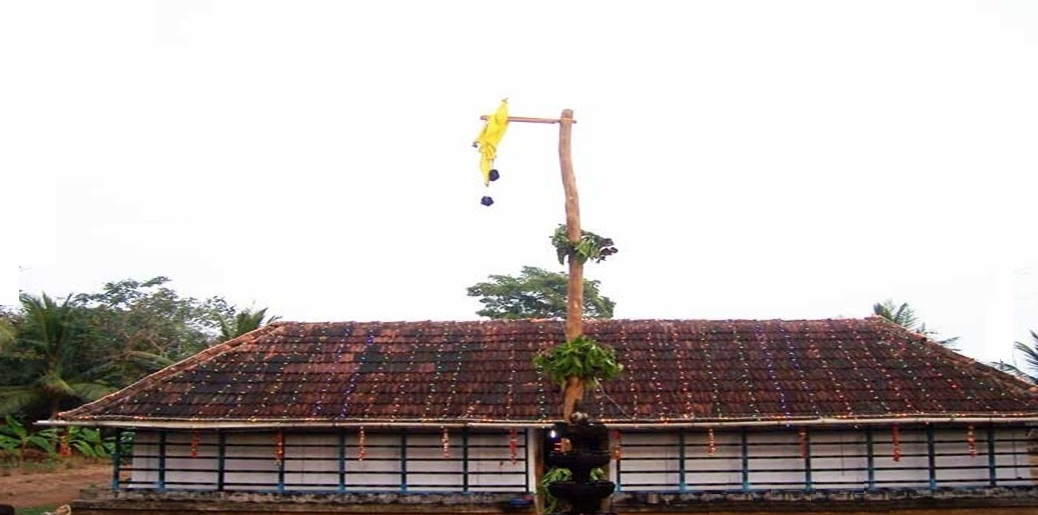
- Shreekandeshwara Mahadeva Temple
- Interactive map of Avanur
- Coordinates: 10.593500°N 76.1697700°E
- Country: India
- State: Kerala
- District: Thrissur

Population (2011)
  - Total: 7,879

Languages
  - Official: Malayalam, English
- Time zone: UTC+5:30 (IST)
- PIN: 680541
- Vehicle registration: KL-

Avanur is a village in Thrissur district in the state of Kerala, India. Avanur is around 3 km east of the Thrissur-Kunnamkulam highway from Mundur junction and around 8 to 9 km from Thrissur town.

== Demographics ==
As of 2011 India census, Avanur had a population of 7,879, with 3,815 males and 4,064 females.
