= Tholur =

Coordinates: 10.5728°N 76.1273°E

- village
- Interactive map of Tholur
- Country: India
- State: Kerala
- District: Thrissur

Area
  - Total: 3.66 km^{2} (1.41 sq mi)

Population (2011)
  - Total: 7,454
  - Density: 2,040/km^{2} (5,270/sq mi)

Languages
  - Official: Malayalam, English
- Time zone: UTC+5:30 (IST)
- PIN: 680552
- Vehicle registration: KL-08
- Nearest city: Thrissur

Tholur is a village in Thrissur district in the state of Kerala, India.

== Demographics ==
As of 2011 India census, Tholur had a population of 7,454 with 3,543 males and 3,911 females, with a 1.8% annual growth rate from the 2001 population of 6,225.
