= List of districts of Kerala =

Districts of Keralam
- Districts of Keralam
- Category: Districts
- Location: Keralam
- Number: 14 districts
- Populations: Wayanad – 846,637 (lowest); Malappuram – 4,494,998 (highest)
- Areas: Alappuzha – 1,415 km^{2} (546 sq mi) (smallest); Idukki – 4,612 km^{2} (1,781 sq mi) (largest)
- Government: Government of Keralam
- Subdivisions: Revenue Divisions Taluks

The Indian state of Keralam is divided into 14 districts, which are officially referred to as revenue districts. Districts are the major administrative units of a state which are further sub-divided into revenue divisions and taluks.

Idukki district is the largest district in Keralam with a total land area of 461,223.14 hectares.

When the independent India merged smaller states together, Travancore and Cochin states were integrated to form Travancore-Cochin state on 1 July 1949. However, North Malabar and South Malabar remained under the Madras state. The States Reorganisation Act of 1 November 1956 elevated Kerala to statehood through the unification of Malayalam-speaking territories in the southwestern Malabar Coast of India.

The state comprises three parts – the Northern Keralam districts of Kasaragod, Kannur, Wayanad, Kozhikode, Malappuram; the Central Keralam districts of Palakkad, Thrissur, Ernakulam, Kottayam, Idukki; and the Southern Keralam districts of Alappuzha, Pathanamthitta, Kollam and Thiruvananthapuram. Such a regional division occurred being part of historical regions of Cochin, North Malabar, South Malabar, and Travancore. North Malabar region includes Kasargod, Kannur, Wayanad, and the northern region of Kozhikode district, South Malabar region includes south-central part of Kozhikode district, Malappuram, parts except Chittoor taluk of Palakkad district, Kunnamkulam and Chavakkad region of Thrissur district. The regions of South Malabar and Kingdom of Cochin, both of which share many historical, geographical, and cultural similarities, together constitute the districts of Central Keralam. The Travancore region is incorporated in the districts of South Keralam. The Travancore region was again divided into three zones as Northern Travancore (Hill Range) (Idukki District, Kottayam district and eastern portion of Ernakulam district), Central Travancore (Central Range) (Kollam district, Pathanamthitta and Alappuzha district) and Southern Travancore (Southern Range) (Thiruvananthapuram).

The districts in Keralam are often named after the largest town or city in the district. Some of the districts were renamed in 1990 from the anglicised names to their local names. The 14 districts are further divided into 27 revenue divisions, 77 taluks and 1664 revenue villages for land revenue administration.

== Administrative structure ==
Regional grouping of districts in Kerala

Districts were originally created for land revenue administration, but today they function as key units for overall governance and administration.

District administration is historically associated with the Revenue Department, but it now serves as a multi-departmental coordinating authority at the district level, overseeing emergency and disaster management, elections, law and order, planning, and licensing. The Collectorate is the administrative headquarters of a district.

=== Revenue administration ===
A district is administered by a District Collector, who is an officer of the Indian Administrative Service (IAS) of Kerala cadre, and is appointed by the State Government of Kerala. The headquarters of the district administration is known as the Collectorate. The District Collector serves as the head of revenue administration in the district and also functions as the District Magistrate responsible for maintaining law and order within the district. The Collector serves as both the agent of the state Government and also as the representative of the people in the district. District administration is performed by the various Departments of the State Government, each of which has its own office at the district level. The District Officers of the various Departments in the district render technical advice to the collector in the discharge of his duties. The district collector is assisted by an additional district magistrate and deputy collectors.

The districts are divided into revenue divisions which comprises several taluks under its jurisdiction. Taluks comprises several revenue villages. A revenue division is headed by a Revenue Divisional Officer/Sub Collector, and taluk is headed by a Tehsildar. The Tahsildar is assisted in each revenue village by village officers and village assistants. Village offices functions as the grassroot of the revenue administration.

=== Local governance ===
For the purpose of local governance, there are local-self government institutions, which includes 941 gramapanchayats, 152 block panchayats, 14 district panchayats, 6 corporations and 87 municipalities.

The panchayati raj institutions (gram panchayats, block panchayats, district panchayats) look after the governance of the rural areas in the district. These panchayats are governed by elected councils, headed by presidents and vice presidents respectively.

An NGO Contributes to Kerala Maps - Based on Open Street Maps & Wikivoyage

The urban local bodies (municipalities and municipal corporations) look after the governance of the urban areas in the district. These urban local bodies are governed by elected municipal councils, headed by mayor/chairperson and deputy mayor/vice chairperson respectively. A municipality, which consists of urban areas, is administered by a municipal council headed by a Municipal Chairperson. In cities, a municipal corporation, administered by a corporation council headed by a mayor, oversees the municipal affairs.

The other administrative subdivision is "blocks", which is co-terminus with the block panchayats area. Th CD blocks are established for the purpose of rural development, aligning with the boundaries of the block panchayat. Each CD Block encompasses several gram panchayats within its limit. A block is administered by a Block Development Officer (BDO), appointed by the government, who also functions as the ex-officio secretary of the Block Panchayat.

A taluk consists of urban units such as statutory towns and census towns and rural units called gram panchayats (for revenue purposes). The Local Self-Governments Department (LSGD), Government of Kerala, coordinates and supervises the administrative affairs of these local bodies and has district-level offices.

=== Police ===
There are 20 police districts in total, and among these, 8 police districts are coterminous with the respective revenue districts, while the remaining 12 police districts are constituted by bifurcating the revenue district into "city" and "rural" areas. Each police district is headed by a "District Police Chief" (DPC), an IPS officer typically holding the rank of Superintendent of Police (SP) or above. The District Police Chief is responsible for maintaining law and order, conducting criminal investigations and overseeing police administration in the district.

These districts are further divided into police sub-divisions. A subdivision comprises several police stations under its jurisdiction, each headed by an Assistant Superintendent of Police or Deputy Superintendent of Police (DySP) designated as the sub-divisional police officer (SDPO). The police station is the basic unit of police administration at the district level, each headed by an Inspector of Police, or in the case of rural areas, by a Sub-Inspector of Police designated as the Station House Officer (SHO).

=== Judiciary ===
There are 14 judicial districts in Kerala. Each of the districts has a District & Sessions Court, headed by a Principal District and Sessions Judge.

=== Other ===
Each state government department has a district office at the district level, headed by district-level officials, such as the District Medical Officer for the health department, District Fire Officer for the Fire and Rescue Department, Divisional Forest Officer for the Forest Department, etc. Each department's district-level offices oversee their respective areas of administration.

Districts in Kerala

== History ==
At the time of formation, Kerala had only five districts: Malabar, Thrissur, Kottayam, Kollam, and Thiruvananthapuram.

On 1 January 1957, the Malabar district was trifurcated to form new districts of Kannur, Kozhikode, and Palakkad, bringing the total to seven districts.

Alappuzha district was carved out of erstwhile Kottayam and Kollam districts on 17 August 1957, to form the 8th district.

Ernakulam district was formed on 1 April 1958 as the 9th district, carved out of parts of erstwhile Thrissur and Kottayam districts.

Malappuram district was formed on 16 June 1969 as the 10th district, with Ernad and Tirur taluks of the erstwhile Kozhikode district and Perinthalmanna and Ponnani taluks of Palakkad district.

Idukki district was formed on 26 January 1972 as the 11th district, with Devikulam, Udumbanchola and Peermedu taluks of the erstwhile Kottayam district and Thodupuzha taluk of the erstwhile Ernakulam district.

Wayanad district was formed on 1 November 1980 as the 12th district in Kerala by carving out areas from Kozhikode and Kannur districts.

Pathanamthitta district was formed on 1 November 1982 as the 13th district by carving out the entire Pathanamthitta taluk and nine villages of Kunnathur taluk from Kollam district, entire Thiruvalla taluk and part of Chengannur and Mavelikkara taluks from Alapphuzha district and parts of Idukki district.

Kasaragod district was formed on 24 May 1984 as the 14th district by carving out a major portion of the erstwhile Kannur district. Kasaragod remains the last formed district of Kerala to date.

== Characteristics ==
Idukki district is the largest district in Kerala by area. Alappuzha district is noted for its small area, while Malappuram district stands out as the most populous in Kerala. Wayanad, Idukki, and Kasargod are the least populated districts in the state. Ernakulam district stands out as the most urbanised in Kerala, housing a municipal corporation and 11 municipalities, with 68.07% of its population residing in urban areas. Thiruvananthapuram has the highest population density at 1509 persons per sq.km, followed closely by Alappuzha and Kozhikode districts.

== Districts ==
Sl No	Code	District	Headquarters	Established	Population (2018)	Area	Subdivisions	Map
1	ALA	Alappuzha	Alappuzha	17 Aug 1957	2,146,033	1,415 km^{2} (546 sq mi)	Ambalapuzha (Alappuzha); Chengannur; Cherthala; Karthikappally (Haripad); Kuttanad (Mankombu); Mavelikkara	
2	ERN	Ernakulam	Kakkanad	1 Apr 1958	3,427,659	2,407 km^{2} (929 sq mi)	Aluva; Kanayannur (Ernakulam); Kochi (Fort Kochi); Kothamangalam; Kunnathunad (Perumbavoor); Muvattupuzha; North Paravur	
3	IDU	Idukki	Painavu	26 Jan 1972	1,093,156	4,612 km^{2} (1,781 sq mi)	Devikulam; Peermade; Udumbanchola (Nedumkandam); Idukki (Painavu); Thodupuzha	
4	KAN	Kannur	Kannur	1 Jan 1957	2,615,266	2,966 km^{2} (1,145 sq mi)	Thalassery; Iritty; Kannur; Taliparamba; Payyanur	
5	KAS	Kasaragod	Kasaragod	24 May 1984	1,390,894	1,989 km^{2} (768 sq mi)	Manjeshwaram (Uppala); Kasaragod; Vellarikundu; Hosdurg	
6	KOL	Kollam	Kollam	1 Nov 1956 ( 1 July 1949)	2,659,431	2,483 km^{2} (959 sq mi)	Kollam; Karunagappally; Kunnathur (Sasthamkotta); Kottarakkara; Punalur; Pathanapuram	
7	KOT	Kottayam	Kottayam	1 Nov 1956 (1 July 1949 )	1,983,573	2,206 km^{2} (852 sq mi)	Changanasserry; Kanjirappally; Kottayam; Vaikom; Meenachil (Pala)	
8	KOZ	Kozhikode	Kozhikode	1 Jan 1957	3,249,761	2,345 km^{2} (905 sq mi)	Kozhikode; Thamarassery; Koyilandy; Vatakara	
9	MAL	Malappuram	Malappuram	16 Jun 1969	4,494,998	3,554 km^{2} (1,372 sq mi)	Nilambur; Eranad (Manjeri); Kondotty; Perinthalmanna; Ponnani; Tirur; Tirurangadi	
10	PAL	Palakkad	Palakkad	1 Jan 1957	2,952,254	4,482 km^{2} (1,731 sq mi)	Alathur; Chittur; Palakkad; Pattambi; Ottappalam; Mannarkkad; Attappady (Agali)	
11	PAT	Pathanamthitta	Pathanamthitta	1 Nov 1982	1,172,212	2,652 km^{2} (1,024 sq mi)	Adoor; Konni; Kozhencherry (Pathanamthitta); Ranni; Mallappally; Thiruvalla	
12	THI	Thiruvananthapuram	Thiruvananthapuram	1 Nov 1956 (1 July 1949)	3,355,148	2,189 km^{2} (845 sq mi)	Neyyattinkara; Kattakada; Nedumangad; Thiruvananthapuram; Chirayinkeezhu (Attingal); Varkala	
13	THR	Thrissur	Thrissur	1 Nov 1956 (1 Jul 1949)	3,243,170	3,027 km^{2} (1,169 sq mi)	Kodungallur; Mukundapuram (Irinjalakuda); Chalakudy; Chavakkad; Thalapilly (Wadakkancheri); Thrissur; Kunnamkulam	
14	WAY	Wayanad	Kalpetta	1 Nov 1980	846,637	2,130 km^{2} (820 sq mi)	Mananthavady; Sultan Bathery; Vythiri (Kalpetta)	
Total	14	14	14		34,630,192	38,852 km^{2} (15,001 sq mi)	78	

== Demands for new districts ==
Proposals for the creation of new administrative districts in Kerala are primarily driven by the need to decentralize administration in highly populated regions, reduce travel times from remote or inland areas to current coastal headquarters, and handle localized economic changes brought on by major infrastructure developments.

List of Proposed Districts in Kerala Grouped by Current Parent District(s)
Proposed District	Proposed HQ	Expected Area of Jurisdiction	Rationale for Creation
Tirur	Tirur	Tirur, Tirurangadi, and Ponnani Taluks of Malappuram. No. of Taluks: 3.	Driven by Malappuram's position as the state's most populous district (approaching 4.5 million residents), advocates seek to split the administrative overhead to enhance public utility and service delivery.
Proposed from Malappuram and Palakkad
Valluvanad	Ottapalam or Perinthalmanna	Perinthalmanna Taluk of Malappuram and Pattambi, Ottapalam, Mannarkkad and Attappadi Taluks of Palakkad. No. of Taluks: 5	Grounded in historical regional identity and regional administrative convenience, centering operations around the inland city of Perinthalmanna.
Proposed from Ernakulam and Idukki
Muvattupuzha	Muvattupuzha	Muvattupuzha, Kothamangalam, and Kunnathunadu taluks of Ernakulam and Thodupuzha taluk of Idukki. No. of Taluks: 4	Proposed to isolate and support the distinct administrative and development needs of an interior agricultural zone, separating its management from the industrial profile of coastal Kochi.
Proposed from Thiruvananthapuram
Neyyattinkara	Neyyattinkara	Neyyattinkara and Kattakada taluks. No. of Taluks: 2	Proposed to manage accelerated economic expansion and infrastructure infrastructure demands in the south following the operationalization of the Vizhinjam Port, requiring a dedicated, closer administrative headquarters.

Proposed District	Proposed HQ	Expected Area of Jurisdiction	Rationale for Creation
Proposed from Kozhikode
Vadakara	Vadakara or Perambra	Vadakara and Koyilandi No. of Taluks: 2	Proposed to isolate and support the distinct administrative and development needs of the northern part of Kozhikode district.
