= Wadakkancherry, Thrissur =

Wadakkanchery
- Town
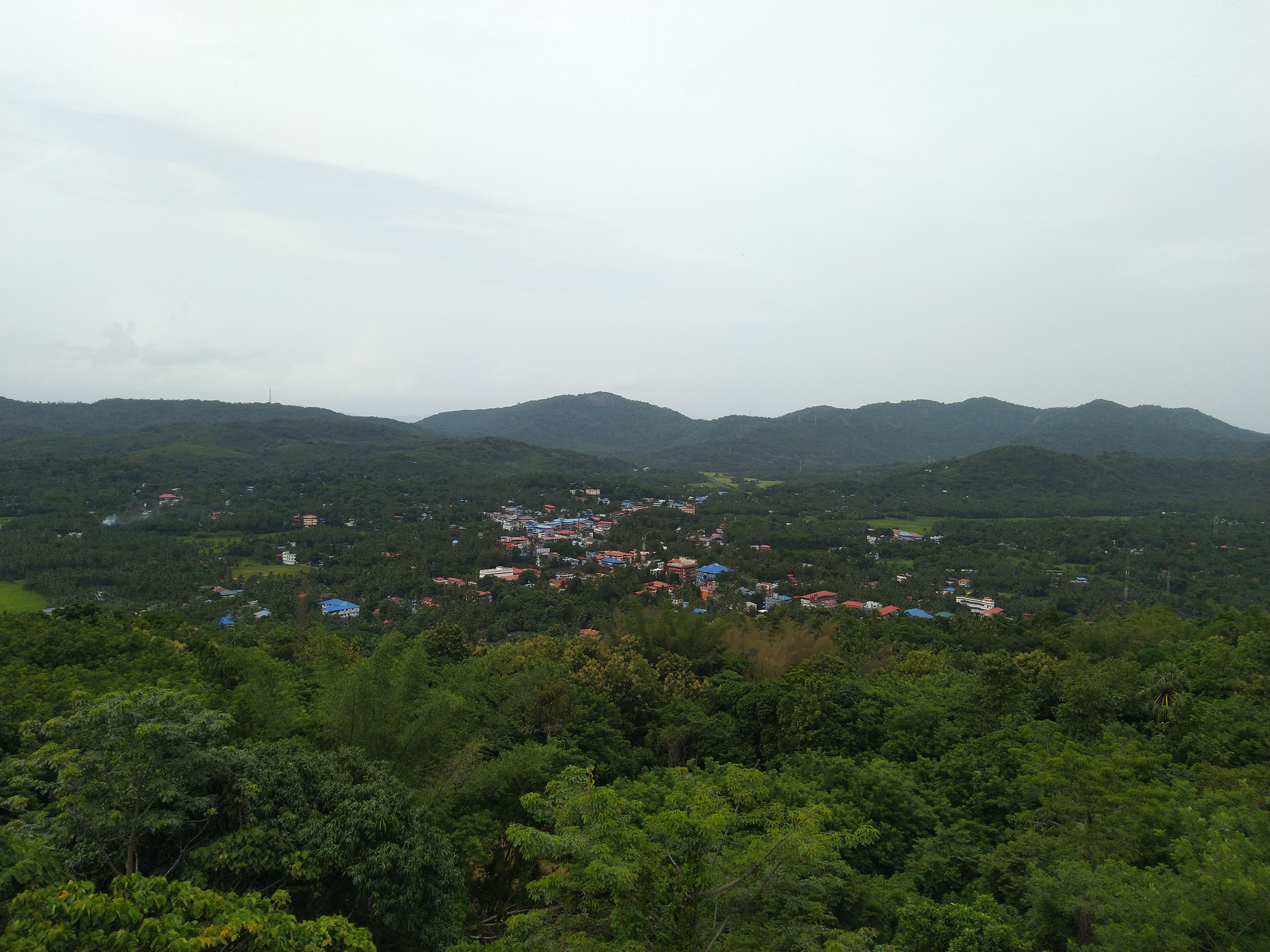
- An aerial view of Wadakkanchery

- Location in Kerala, India
- Coordinates: 10°39′34″N 76°14′58″E
- Country: India
- State: Kerala
- District: Thrissur
- Municipality: 2015

Government
  - Type: Grade 3 Municipality
  - Body: Wadakkanchery Municipality

Languages
  - Official: Malayalam, English
- Time zone: UTC+5:30 (IST)
- PIN: 680582
- Telephone code: 04884
- Vehicle registration: KL-48
- Nearest city: Thrissur (18 km)
- Lok Sabha constituency: Alathur
- Assembly constituency: Wadakkanchery
- Climate: cool&hot (Köppen)
- Website: www.wadakanchery.com

Wadakkancherry (IPA: [ʋɐɖɐkːaːɲdʒeːɾi]) is a town and municipality in Thrissur district, Kerala, India. It is the headquarters of Thalappilly taluk and located on State Highway 22 between Thrissur and Shoranur. State Highway 50 connects Wadakkancherry with coastal town of Chavakkad and other towns like Guruvayoor and Kunnamkulam.

Wadakkanchery Municipality was formed in 2015 by merging Wadakkanchery Grama Panchayat with Mundathikode Grama Panchayat. There are two places with similarly pronounced names: Wadakkanchery in Thrissur district and Vadakkencherry in Palakkad district.

== Demographics ==
Social composition in Wadakkancherry (2011)
Community	Percent
Thiyyar	37.12%
Other Hindu	15.76%
Islam	19.77%
Christianity	27.15%

== Politics ==
Wadakkanchery assembly constituency is part of Alathur Lok Sabha constituency.

== Suburbs and villages ==
- Kumaranellur
- Thekkumkara
- Malakka (Kerala)
- Nalamkode
