= Nadapuram =

- Town
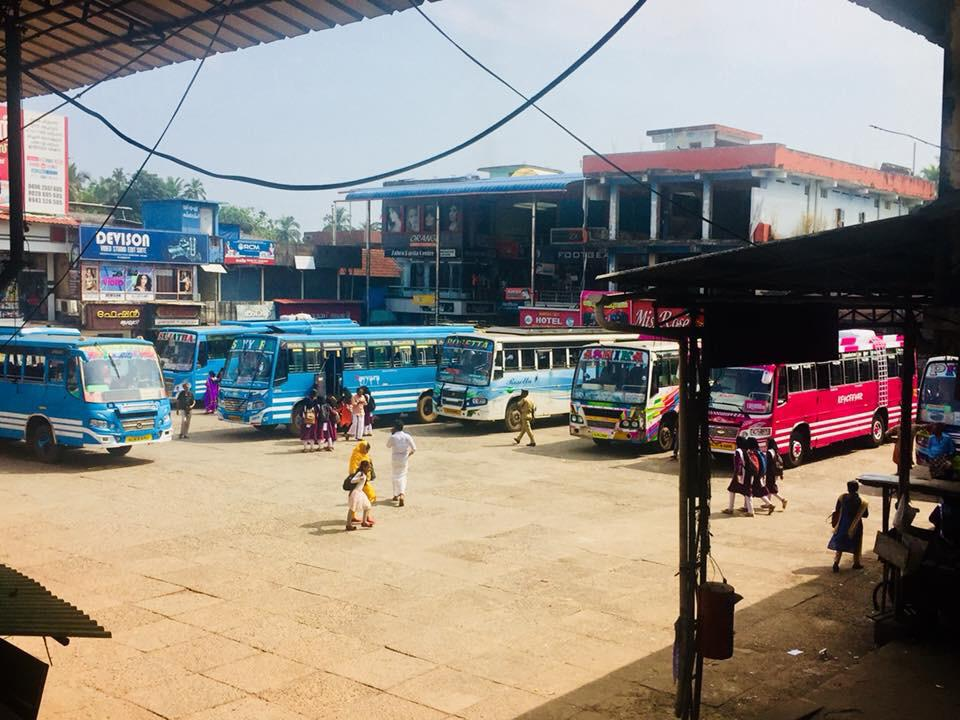
- Nadapuram bus stand

- Location in Kerala, India Nadapuram (India)
- Coordinates: 11°42′0″N 75°40′0″E
- Country: India
- State: Kerala
- District: Kozhikode

Area
  - Total: 20.44 km^{2} (7.89 sq mi)

Population (2011)
  - Total: 40,230
  - Density: 1,968/km^{2} (5,098/sq mi)

Languages
  - Official: Malayalam, English
- Time zone: UTC+5:30 (IST)
- PIN: 673504
- Telephone code: 0496
- Vehicle registration: KL 18
- Nearest city: Vatakara
- Vidhan Sabha constituency: Nadapuram
- Lok Sabha constituency: Vatakara
- Website: www.nadapuram.com

Nadapuram is a census town and a special grade panchayath located in Kozhikode District of Kerala, coming under Nadapuram assembly constituency. It is in the North Malabar region of Kerala, India.

== History ==
In the past, Nadapuram was the place which lies in between Kuttipuram Kovilakam and Kadathanad palace. The derivation of the name Nadapuram is widely theorized through the name Naadapuram (land of melody). Nadapuram is the place that is well-known as part of the ballads of North (Vadakkan paattukal) and Mappilai Ballads (Mappilla paattukal) and is notable for its popular dialect (vyavahaara bhasha) and its distinct Naadan paattu style. Art forms like Dafmuttu, Aravanamuttu, Poorakkali and Kolkkali were nourished in this place.

In his book Malayala Rajyam Charithrathodu Chernna Bhoomisathram, Hermen Gundert states that Nadapuram is two miles northeast to Kuttipuram; also, there is a mosque (mazjid) and a market mainly concentrated on the pepper business.

Kuttipuram was part of the famous Kurumbanad Taluk and was famous for its martial arts. Nowadays, the remnant of Kuttipuram Kovilakam is only a pond with dilapidated pavement and covered with waterweed.

In earlier times, Nadapuram was well known for its secular nature and was famous as a centre for Islamic teaching. Significant marks for its secularism can be noted in places like Kallachi where the Kallachi Avolam road is named in the name of ruler Tipu Sulthan.

Nadapuram is also known for playing a role in Indian nationalism. The urge for freedom made a group of people led by Sri. Appukurup to try to make an explosion at the Nadapuram Munsif court using a bomb back when it was under British rulers. The Nadapuram Munsif court was formed in 1910. Nadapuram has honoured its freedom warriors like Sri Rairukurup, P Krishinan Nambiar, Edavalath Kanaran master and Chingonth Kunhiraman Nair for the fight they had made for their country and made their land proud.

== Demographics ==
Religion in Nadapuram (2011)
1. Islam (52.2%)
2. Hinduism (47.5%)
3. Christianity (0.19%)
4. Other (0.07%)

As of the 2011 India census, Nadapuram has a population of 40,230. Hindu and Mappilas (Muslims) are major religions. Males constitute 47% of the population and females 53%. Hindu: 47.52%, Muslim: 52.21%, Christian: 0.19% and Others: 0.07%. Nadapuram has an average literacy rate of 92.64%, higher than the national average of 74.4%. Male literacy is around 96.34% while female literacy rate is 89.49%. In Nadapuram, 13.18% of the population is under 6 years of age. The Malayalam language is used widely as in the rest of Kerala.

== Economy ==
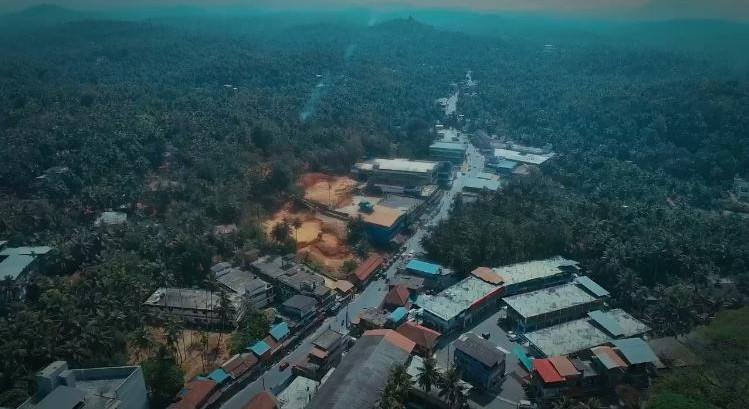
Aerial view of Kallachi

Most of the people are working outside India, particularly in the Persian Gulf area. The main income of the locality is based on these NRIs. Nadapuram is greatly influenced by the luxuries of Gulf regions. One can find magnificent houses with modern facilities, which reflect the wealth of the local people.

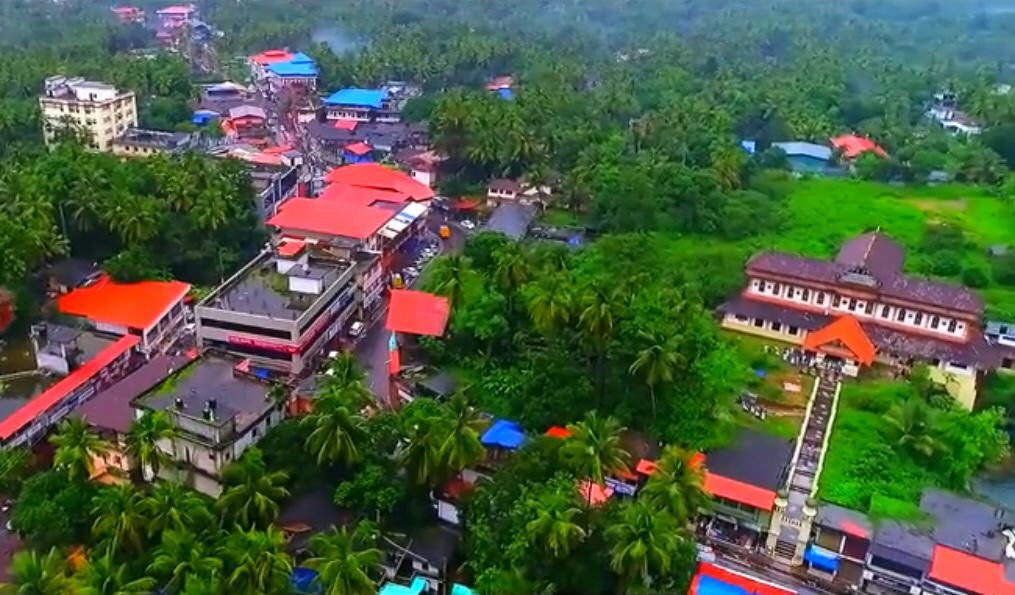
Vadakara Road

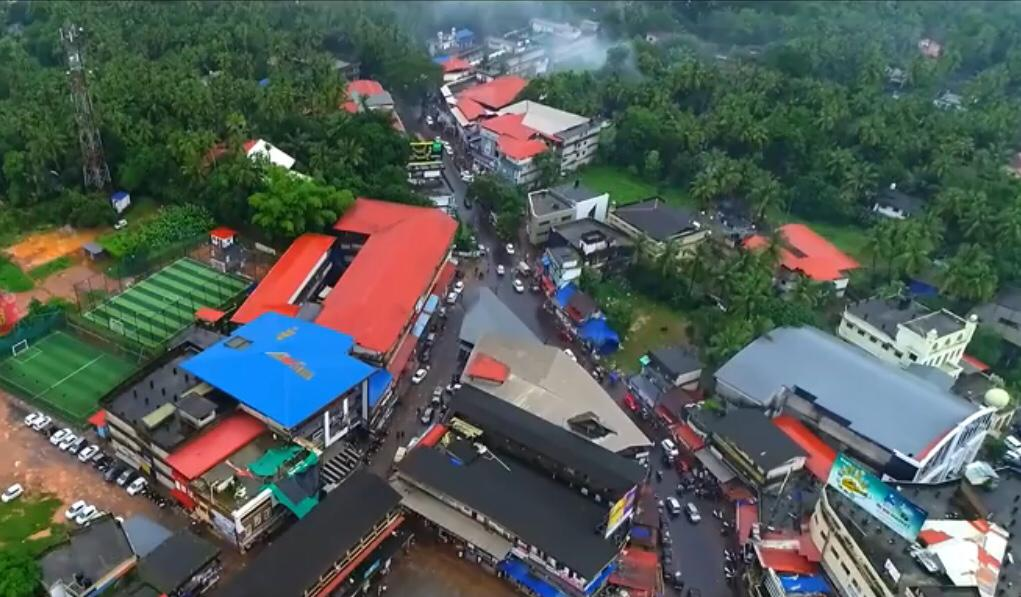
Thalassery Road

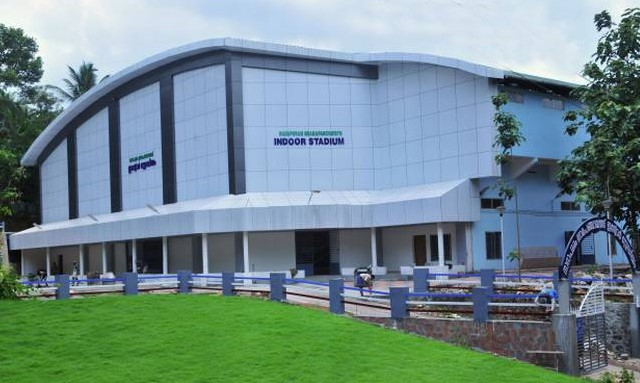
Nadapuram Indoor Stadium

== Politics ==
Nadapuram is the stronghold of the Indian Union Muslim League (IUML). It is a part of the Nadapuram assembly constituency and the Vadakara Lok Sabha constituency. Nadapuram is infamous for the political violence between CPIM and the Indian Union Muslim League.

Constituency	Name of Constituency	Leader	Party
Parliament	Vadakara	Sri. Shafi Parambil	INC
Assembly	Nadapuram	Sri. K. M. Abhijith	INC
Panchayat	Nadapuram	Smt. Safeera Moonamkuni	IUML

== Nadapuram Assembly Constituency ==
Nadapuram Assembly constituency consists of the Panchayats Vanimel, Edacheri, Thuneri, Chekkiad, Valayam, Narippatta, Kayakkodi, Kavilumpara, Maruthonkara and Nadapuram.

K. M. Abhijith is the MLA of Nadapuram. In the 2026 anssembly elections, he defeated Adv. P. Vasantham, of CPI at a margin of 23600 votes. The present MP (member of parliament) Binoy Viswam represented Nadapuram constituency in 2001 & 2006.

History of Nadapuram Assembly Constituency

2026	K. M. Abhijith	INC	P.Vasantham	CPI
2021	E. K. Vijayan	CPI	Praveenkumar	INC
2016	E. K. Vijayan	CPI	Praveenkumar	INC
2011	E. K. Vijayan	CPI	V.M.Chandran	INC
2006	Binoy Viswam	CPI	M Veerankutty	INC
2001	Binoy Viswam	CPI	K.P.Rajan	INC
1996	Sathyan Mokeri	CPI	Abu K.C.	INC
1991	Sathyan Mokeri	CPI	P. Shaduli	MUL
1987	Sathyan Mokeri	CPI	N.P. Moideen	INC
1982	K . T. Kanaran	CPI	M. T. Padma	INC
1980	K . T. Kanaran	CPI	K. G. Adiyodi	INC(I)
1977	Kandalottu Kunhambu	CPI	E. V. Kumaran	CPM
1970	M. Kumaran Master	CPI	E. V. Kumaran	CPM
1967	E.V.Kumaran	CPI(M)	P.Balakrishnan	INC
1965	C. H. Kanaran	CPI(M)	K.P. Padmanabhan	INC
1960	Hameed Ali Shemnad	ML	C. H. Kanaran	CPI
1957	C. H. Kanaran	CPI	Kunhammad Haji V. K.	INC

== Geography ==
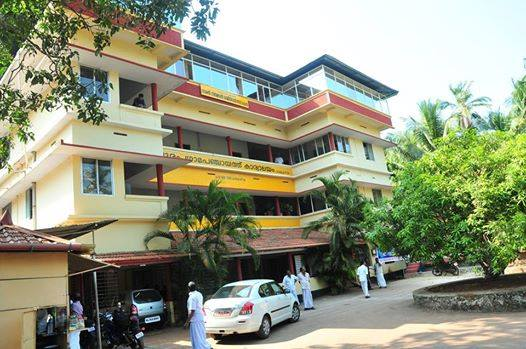
Nadapuram Grama Panchayat Office, Kallachi

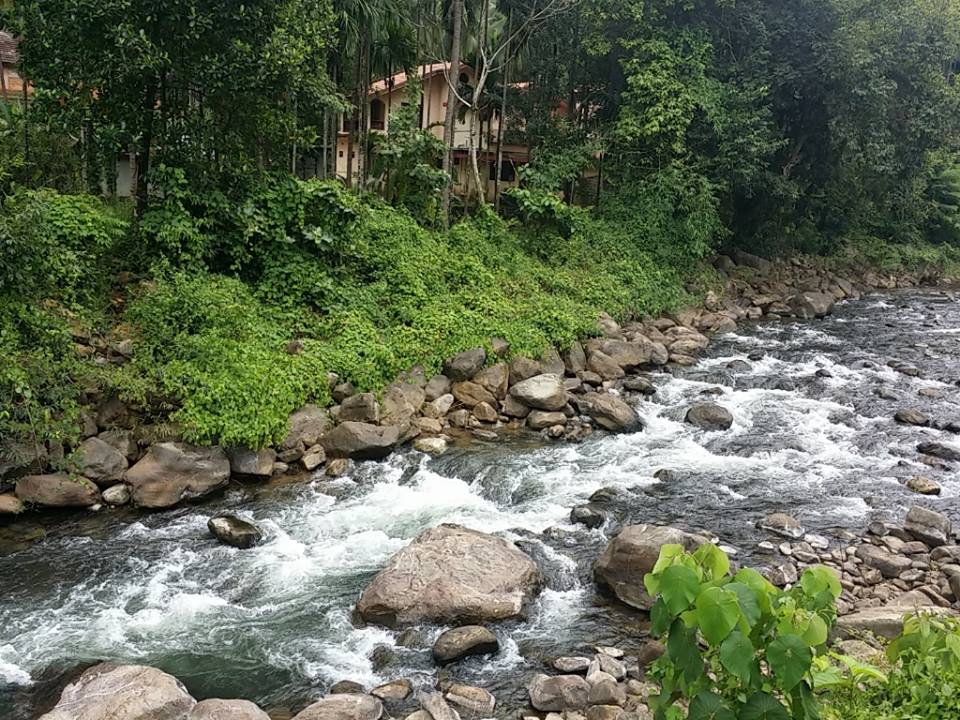
Mahe River at Vilangad

Nadapuram is located at 11.68°N 75.65°E. It has an average elevation of 25.9 m (85 ft). Geographically, Nadapuram is situated about 14 km to the northeast of Vadakara and approximately 21 km to the southeast of Thalassery. The panchayat lies by the side of a river known by different names as the Vishnumangalam, Vanimel or Mahe River.

== Landmarks ==
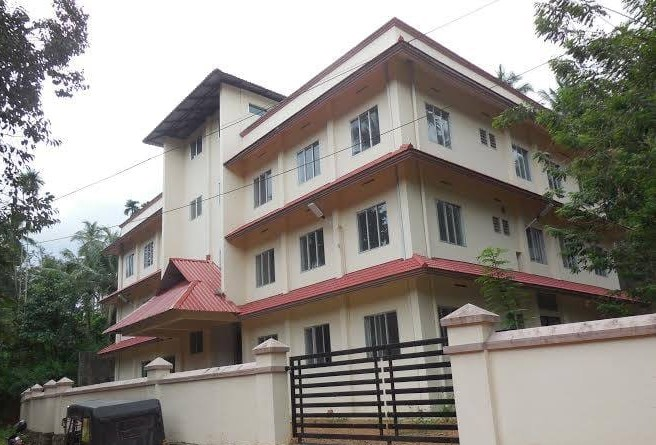
Nadapuram Mini Civil Station, Kallachi

The Nadapuram Masjid mosque played an important role in the history of Nadapuram as it nourishes the tradition and culture for over 100 years. Nowadays, this mosque is an important landmark to Nadapuram. Nadapuram also has Judicial First Class Magistrate Court & Munsiff Court, the office of the DYSP, the office of the Circle Inspector of Police, Police Station, Police control Room, Traffic Unit, Gov't Taluk Hospital, Gov't College, Mini Civil Station, PWD Rest house, Sub Treasury, the BSNL divisional office, Fire & Rescue Station, AEO office, Sub Registrar office, Excise Range office, Land Tribunal office, KSBCDC sub district office and the KSEB Division office, Sub division office, Section office & 110KV Substation. In May 2014, a prestigious indoor stadium was inaugurated at Nadapuram.

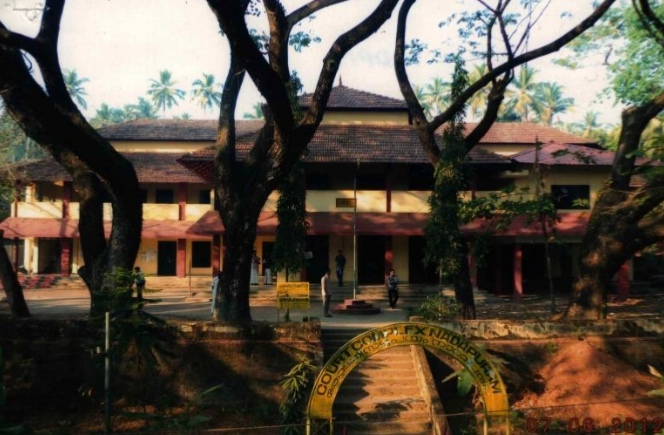
Nadapuram Court

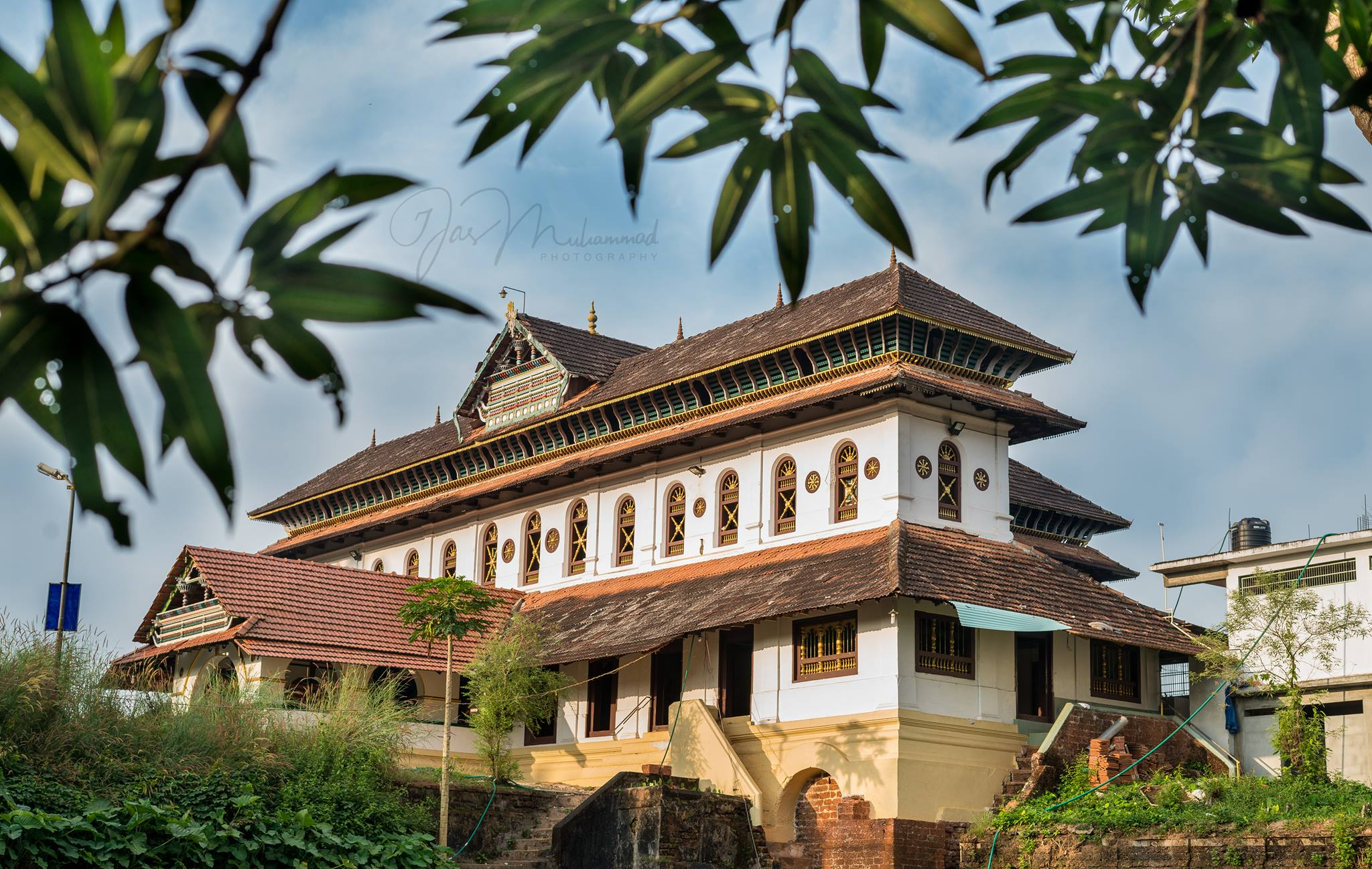
Nadapuram Mosque

=== Law and order ===
The town comes under the jurisdiction of the Nadapuram police station, which was opened before the year 1910, which is known from the locals. The correct date of opening and Govt. notification is not available. The station has the jurisdiction over the panchayaths of Nadapuram, Thuneri, Purameri and parts of Edacheri, and Ayancheri.

The border police stations are headquartered at Edacheri, Vadakara, Valayam and Kuttiady.

Nadapuram is also headquarters of one among the four subdivisions of Kozhikode Rural District Police. The police stations at Nadapuram, Valayam, Kuttiady, and Thottilpalam comes under jurisdiction of Nadapuram subdivision of district police. Nadapuram Traffic unit & Control room also come under the Subdivision.

Jurisdictional courts of Nadapuram Station

- Judicial First Class Magistrate Court Nadapuram
- Munsiff Court Nadapuram
- Pocso Fast Track Special Court Nadapuram

== Transportation ==
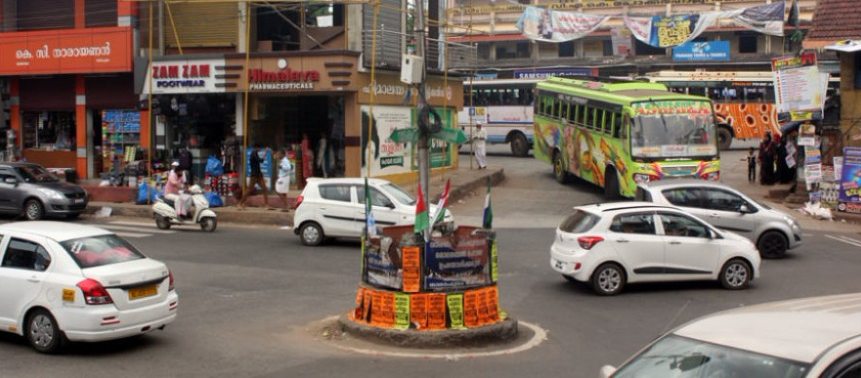
Nadapuram Town

Nadapuram town is 63 km away from Kozhikode City. SH 38 (Aka - Airport Road) Passes through Nadapuram. Nadapuram Town connects to other parts of India through Vatakara city on the west and Kuttiady town on the east. National highway No.66 passes through Vatakara and the northern stretch connects to Mangalore, Goa and Mumbai. The southern stretch connects to Cochin and Trivandrum. The eastern Highway going through Kuttiady connects to Mananthavady, Mysore and Bangalore. Important local interior routes include P. Shaduli Road, which connects residential and commercial neighborhoods such as Kakkamvelli to the main town center. The road is named in honor of P. Shaduli (c. 1950–2022), a prominent local writer, former President of the Nadapuram Grama Panchayat, and Indian Union Muslim League (IUML) leader who resided along the route and contested the Nadapuram Assembly constituency in 1991.

- Regular bus services serve Vatakara, Thalassery, Kuttiady, Panoor and Thottilpalam. Hilly regions like Kaiveli, Kumbala Chola, Valayam, Chuzhali, Kallunira, Vanimel, Vilangad are connected to Nadapuram via kallachi through Bus route. KSRTC Bus service are available to Vadakara, Thalassery, Mananthavady, Sulthan Bathery, Kalpetta, Kannur Guruvayoor, Thrissur, Mysore & Bangalore.

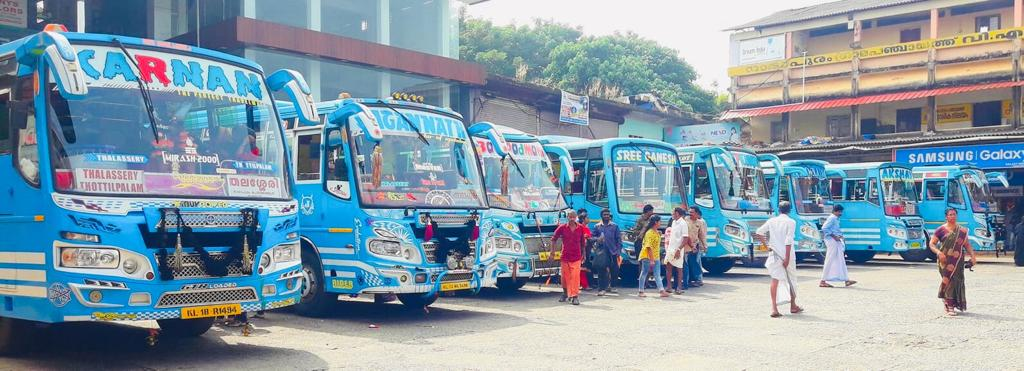
Nadapuram Bus Station

=== Railway ===
There is no direct railway line that connects Nadapuram with other cities. Nearest stations are at Vatakara(16 kilometres), Nadapuram Road (11 kilometres) and Mahe (18 kilometres). Nadapuram can reach Vatakara or Nadapuram Road by train and then proceed by road through Orkkatteri & Edacheri.

=== Air ===
The air gateway to Nadapuram is the Kannur International Airport (KIAL) located at Mattannur, which is about 38 km from the Nadapuram Bus Stand and handles both domestic and international flights. Calicut International Airport is 88 km away from Nadapuram

== Educational organizations ==
There are many schools in Nadapuram, including state syllabus and CBSE syllabus schools.government and private schools

== Climate ==
Nadapuram has a tropical climate. During most months of the year, there is significant rainfall in Nadapuram. There is only a short dry season. This climate is considered to be Am according to the Köppen-Geiger climate classification. The average annual temperature in Nadapuram is 27.2 °C. In a year, the average rainfall is 3697 mm. The temperatures are highest on average in April, at around 29.5 °C. In July, the average temperature is 25.7 °C. It is the lowest average temperature of the whole year. The variation in the precipitation between the driest and wettest months is 1111 mm. The average temperatures vary during the year by 3.8 °C.

Climate data for Nadapuram
Month	Jan	Feb	Mar	Apr	May	Jun	Jul	Aug	Sep	Oct	Nov	Dec	Year
Mean daily maximum °C (°F)	31.6 (88.9)	32.1 (89.8)	33.1 (91.6)	33.4 (92.1)	32.8 (91.0)	29.6 (85.3)	28.3 (82.9)	28.8 (83.8)	29.5 (85.1)	30.3 (86.5)	31.0 (87.8)	31.3 (88.3)	31.0 (87.8)
Mean daily minimum °C (°F)	21.6 (70.9)	22.8 (73.0)	24.4 (75.9)	25.7 (78.3)	25.5 (77.9)	23.8 (74.8)	23.2 (73.8)	23.5 (74.3)	23.5 (74.3)	23.6 (74.5)	23.1 (73.6)	21.8 (71.2)	23.5 (74.4)
Average rainfall mm (inches)	4 (0.2)	4 (0.2)	18 (0.7)	88 (3.5)	305 (12.0)	907 (35.7)	1,115 (43.9)	561 (22.1)	284 (11.2)	267 (10.5)	121 (4.8)	23 (0.9)	3,697 (145.7)
Source: Climate-Data.org

== In popular culture ==
The song "Naadapuram Palliyile" from the 1978 Indian Malayalam-language historical drama film Thacholi Ambu is well-known all over Kerala. The music was composed by K. Raghavan and the lyrics were written by Yusufali Kechery. Famous writer Akbar Kakkattil wrote a book named Nadapuram, which is a collection of 16 short stories.

== Notable people ==
- A.K. Balan, Minister of Kerala
- Gani Nigam, Indian footballer
- Abdulla Aboobacker, Indian athlete
- A. Pradeepkumar, former MLA
- Sarjano Khalid, Indian actor
- Iyyamcode Sreedharan, Writer

== See also ==
- Vatakara
- Thalassery
- Mahé River
- Kallachi
- Unniyarcha
