= P.Shaduli =

Indian politician and writer from Kerala (1950–2022)

P. Shaduli

Personal details
- Born: 4 June 1950 Nadapuram, Kerala, India
- Died: 2 February 2022 (aged 71) Nadapuram, Kerala, India
- Party: Indian Union Muslim League
- Spouse: Safiya Shaduli
- Children: 7
- Education: Government College, Madappally; University College Thiruvananthapuram
- Occupation: Politician, writer

P. Shaduli (4 June 1950 – 2 February 2022) was an Indian politician and Malayalam-language writer from Nadapuram, Kozhikode district, Kerala. A member of the Indian Union Muslim League (IUML), he served as a member of its state working committee.

== Early life and education ==
P. Shaduli was born on 4 June 1950 in Nadapuram, Kerala, to A. P. Kalanthan Musliyar. He completed his schooling at Nadapuram Government Upper Primary School and Purameri Rajas High School.

He graduated from Government College, Madappally, where he was active in the Muslim Students Federation (MSF) and contested the college union chairmanship. He later enrolled in a Master of Arts program at University College Thiruvananthapuram, where he helped establish a campus unit of the MSF.

== Political and public career ==
Within the MSF, Shaduli served as president of the Vadakara taluk committee, secretary of the Kozhikode district committee, and state secretary. In the Indian Union Muslim League, he held the posts of general secretary of the Nadapuram constituency committee, vice president of the Kozhikode district committee, and member of the state working committee. He also served as state vice president of the Independent Farmers' Union (Swathanthra Karshaka Sangham).

Shaduli was elected three times to the Nadapuram Grama Panchayat and served two terms as its president. In the 1991 Kerala Legislative Assembly election, he was the United Democratic Front (UDF) candidate for the Nadapuram Assembly constituency, receiving 52,427 votes and finishing second to Communist Party of India (CPI) candidate Sathyan Mokeri, who received 60,053 votes.

During his career, he held appointments in public-sector and statutory bodies, including:

- Chairman, Kerala State Warehousing Corporation
- Chairman, Shoranur Metal Industries
- Director, Steel Industries Kerala Limited (SILK)
- Director, Kerala State Library Council

He was also a founding office-bearer of several educational and religious institutions in Nadapuram, including Nadapuram TIM, MYM Orphanage, MET College, NI Madrasa Kummangode, and SS Madrasa East Kummangode.

== Bibliography ==
Shaduli wrote seven books in Malayalam. His published works include:

- Anayatha Deepangal (അണയാത്ത ദീപങ്ങൾ, Trend Books, 2017)
- Aathmavinte Ullarakalilude Oru Athmeeya Sancharam (ആത്മാവിന്റെ ഉള്ളറകളിലൂടെ ഒരു ആത്മീയ സഞ്ചാരം, Trend Books, 2017)
- Iruloka Vijayam Ullariviloode (ഇരുലോക വിജയം ഉള്ളറിവിലൂടെ, Islamic Study Centre Trust, 2017)
- Stephen Hawking – Pralayam – Rathiravam (സ്റ്റീഫൻ ഹോക്കിങ് - പ്രളയം - രതിരവം)
- Ormakkurippukal (ഓർമ്മക്കുറിപ്പുകൾ)
