= Nadapuram Assembly constituency =

Constituency of the Kerala legislative assembly in India

Nadapuram
- Constituency No. 22 for the Kerala Legislative Assembly
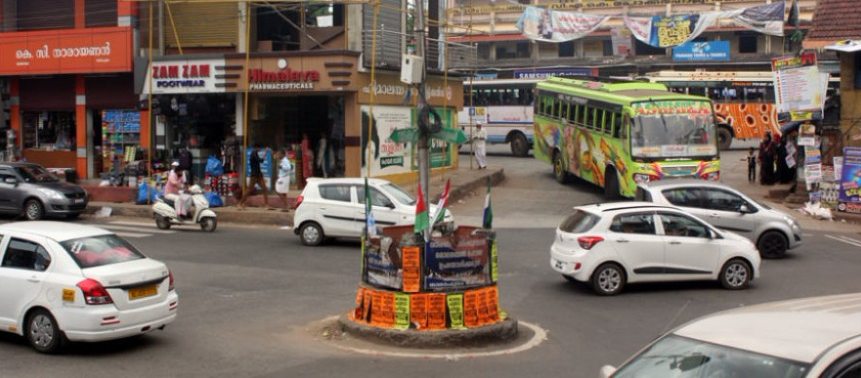
- Nadapuram Junction in Nadapuram Assembly constituency

Constituency details
- Country: India
- Region: South India
- State: Kerala
- District: Kozhikode
- Established: 1951
- Total electors: 2,16,141 (2021)
- Reservation: None

Member of Legislative Assembly
- 16th Kerala Legislative Assembly
- Incumbent K. M. Abhijith
- Party: INC
- Elected year: 2026

Nadapuram State assembly constituency is one of the 140 state legislative assembly constituencies in Kerala in southern India. It is also one of the seven state legislative assembly constituencies included in Vatakara Lok Sabha constituency. As of the 2026 Assembly elections, the current MLA is K.M Abhijith of INC.

== Local self-governed segments ==
Nadapuram Assembly constituency is composed of the following local self-governed segments:

| Sl no. | Name | Status (Grama panchayat/Municipality) | Taluk |
|---|---|---|---|
| 1 | Chekkiad | Grama panchayat | Vatakara |
| 2 | Edacheri | Grama panchayat | Vatakara |
| 3 | Kavilumpara | Grama panchayat | Vatakara |
| 4 | Kayakkodi | Grama panchayat | Vatakara |
| 5 | Maruthonkara | Grama panchayat | Vatakara |
| 6 | Nadapuram | Grama panchayat | Vatakara |
| 7 | Narippatta | Grama panchayat | Vatakara |
| 8 | Thuneri | Grama panchayat | Vatakara |
| 9 | Valayam | Grama panchayat | Vatakara |
| 10 | Vanimal | Grama panchayat | Vatakara |

== Members of the Legislative Assembly ==
The following list contains all members of Kerala Legislative Assembly who have represented the constituency:

| Election | Niyama Sabha | Name | Party | Tenure |
|---|---|---|---|---|
| 1957 | 1st | C. H. Kanaran | Communist Party of India | 1957–1960 |
| 1960 | 2nd | Hameed Ali Shemnad | Indian Union Muslim League | 1960–1965 |
| 1967 | 3rd | E. V. Kumaran | Communist Party of India | 1967–1970 |
| 1970 | 4th | Kumaran Madathil | Communist Party of India | 1970–1977 |
| 1977 | 5th | Kandalottu Kunhambu | Communist Party of India | 1977–1980 |
| 1980 | 6th | K. T. Kanaran | Communist Party of India | 1980–1982 |
| 1982 | 7th | K. T. Kanaran | Communist Party of India | 1982–1987 |
| 1987 | 8th | Sathyan Mokeri | Communist Party of India | 1987–1991 |
| 1991 | 9th | Sathyan Mokeri | Communist Party of India | 1991–1996 |
| 1996 | 10th | Sathyan Mokeri | Communist Party of India | 1996–2001 |
| 2001 | 11th | Binoy Viswam | Communist Party of India | 2001–2006 |
| 2006 | 12th | Binoy Viswam | Communist Party of India | 2006–2011 |
| 2011 | 13th | E. K. Vijayan | Communist Party of India | 2011–2016 |
| 2016 | 14th | E. K. Vijayan | Communist Party of India | 2016–2021 |
| 2021 | 15th | E. K. Vijayan | Communist Party of India | 2021-2026 |
| 2026 | 16th | K.M. Abhijith | Indian National Congress | Incumbent |

== Election results ==
=== LOCAL BODY ELECTIONS ===
==== 2025 ====
| SEGMENT | LDF | NDA | UDF | IND | SDPI | WPI | | LEADING ALLIANCE lMAJORITY VOTE |
| CHEKKIAD | 4907 | 399 | 10154 | 183 | 0 | 0 | 15643 | UDF |
| EDACHERI | 9973 | 1463 | 7766 | 161 | 125 | 0 | 19488 | LDF |
| KAVILUMPARA | 7150 | 999 | 7503 | 0 | 0 | 0 | 15652 | UDF |
| KAYAKKODI | 8153 | 1357 | 7717 | 0 | 61 | 0 | 17288 | LDF |
| MARUTHONKARA | 7143 | 806 | 5361 | 734 | 335 | 285 | 14664 | LDF |
| NADAPURAM | 10365 | 1766 | 16020 | 0 | 161 | 0 | 28312 | UDF |
| NARIPATTA | 9047 | 2242 | 6306 | 478 | 0 | 0 | 18073 | LDF |
| THUNERI | 7213 | 901 | 9113 | 14 | 0 | 0 | 17241 | UDF |
| VALAYAM | 6881 | 1585 | 4603 | 0 | 0 | 0 | 13069 | LDF |
| VANIMAL | 7228 | 943 | 8235 | 0 | 425 | 0 | 16831 | UDF |
| TOTAL | 78060 | 12461 | 82778 | 1570 | 1107 | 285 | 176261 | |
| % | 44.28659772 | 7.069629697 | 46.96331009 | 0.8907245505 | 0.6280459092 | 0.1616920362 | | |

=== 2026 ===
2026 Kerala Legislative Assembly election: Nadapuram
| Party | Candidate | Votes | % | ±% |
|---|---|---|---|---|
| INC | K. M. Abhijith | 99,763 | 52.87 | ▲7.71 |
| CPI | P. Vasantham | 76,163 | 40.36 | ▼7.10 |
| BJP | C. P. Vipin Chandran | 11,506 | 6.10 | ▲0.10 |
| Independent | Vasantha | 314 | 0.17 | |
| NOTA | None of the above | 272 | 0.14 | |
| Independent | Padmakumar | 269 | 0.14 | |
| Independent | Abhijith | 218 | 0.12 | |
| Independent | K. M. Abhijith | 207 | 0.11 | |
| Margin of victory | | 23,600 | 12.51 | ▲10.39 |
| Turnout | | 1,88,712 | | |
| INC gain from CPI | | Swing | ▲7.71 | |

==== 2021 ====
There were 201,719 registered voters in the constituency for the 2021 election.

2021 Kerala Legislative Assembly election: Nadapuram
| Party | Candidate | Votes | % | ±% |
|---|---|---|---|---|
| CPI | E. K. Vijayan | 83,293 | 47.46 | ▲2.00 |
| INC | Praveenkumar | 79,258 | 45.16 | ▲2.00 |
| BJP | M. P. Rajan | 10,537 | 6.00 | ▼2.80 |
| SDPI | K. K. Nasar Master | 1,676 | 0.95 | ▼0.39 |
| NOTA | None of the above | 316 | 0.18 | −0.09 |
| Independent | T.praveen Kumar | 258 | 0.15 | – |
| Independent | Sreedharan K K | 165 | 0.10 | – |
| Margin of victory | | 4,035 | 2.12 | ▼0.60 |
| Turnout | | 162,950 | 80.5 | ▼0.27 |

=== 2016 ===
There were 2,01,719 registered voters in the constituency for the 2016 election.

2016 Kerala Legislative Assembly election: Nadapuram
| Party | Candidate | Votes | % | ±% |
|---|---|---|---|---|
| CPI | E. K. Vijayan | 74,742 | 45.87 | ▼3.35 |
| INC | Praveenkumar | 69,983 | 42.95 | ▼1.12 |
| BJP | M. P. Rajan | 14,493 | 8.90 | ▲4.76 |
| SDPI | C. K. Abdul Rahim | 2,183 | 1.34 | ▲0.07 |
| NOTA | None of the above | 446 | 0.27 | – |
| BSP | K. K. Vasu | 377 | 0.23 | – |
| Independent | E. K. Vijayan Komath | 220 | 0.14 | – |
| Independent | Praveenkumar Thayyullathil | 163 | 0.10 | – |
| Independent | Aluva Aneesh | 151 | 0.09 | – |
| Margin of victory | | 4,759 | 2.92 | ▼3.35 |
| Turnout | | 1,62,929 | 80.77 | ▼1.50 |
| CPI hold | | Swing | ▼3.35 | |

=== 2011 ===
There were 1,77,993 registered voters in the constituency for the 2011 election.

2011 Kerala Legislative Assembly election: Nadapuram
| Party | Candidate | Votes | % | ±% |
|---|---|---|---|---|
| CPI | E. K. Vijayan | 72,078 | 49.22 | |
| INC | V. M. Chandran | 64,532 | 44.07 | |
| BJP | K. P. Prakash Babu | 6,058 | 4.14 | |
| SDPI | Ismail Kammana | 1,865 | 1.27 | – |
| Independent | Chandran | 745 | 0.51 | |
| Independent | C. K. Vijayan | 708 | 0.48 | |
| Independent | K. P. Vijayan | 444 | 0.30 | |
| Margin of victory | | 7,546 | 5.15 | |
| Turnout | | 1,46,430 | 82.27 | |
| CPI hold | | Swing | | |

=== 1952 ===
1952 Madras Legislative Assembly election: Nadapuram
| Party | Candidate | Votes | % | ±% |
|---|---|---|---|---|
| INC | E. K. Sankara Varma Raja | 18,173 | 40.86% | 40.86% |
| CPI | K. Thacharakandy | 16,572 | 37.26% | |
| Socialist Party (India) | Arangil Sreedharan | 9,736 | 21.89% | |
| Margin of victory | | 1,601 | 3.60% | |
| Turnout | | 44,481 | 70.96% | |
| Registered electors | | 62,684 | | |
| INC win (new seat) | | | | |

== See also ==
- Nadapuram
- Kozhikode district
- List of constituencies of the Kerala Legislative Assembly
- 2016 Kerala Legislative Assembly election
