= K. M. Abhijith =

Indian politician

Member of the Kerala Legislative Assembly
- Incumbent
- Assumed office 2026
- Preceded by: E. K. Vijayan
- Constituency: Nadapuram

Personal details
- Born: 1995 (age 30–31)
- Party: Indian National Congress
- Profession: Politician

K. M. Abhijith is an Indian politician from Kerala. He is a member of the Kerala Legislative Assembly from Nadapuram representing the Indian National Congress.

== Early life and education ==
Born to Gopalan Kutty, Abhijith completed his higher education in Kozhikode. He graduated with a Bachelor of Science degree in physics from Government Arts and Science College, Meenchanda in 2014, before earning a postgraduate degree in Mass Communication and Journalism from the University of Calicut in 2016.

== Political career ==
Representing the Indian National Congress, Abhijith contested the Nadapuram Assembly constituency in the 2026 Kerala Legislative Assembly election and won the seat. He secured 99,763 votes, defeating Communist Party of India candidate Adv. P. Vasantham by a margin of 23,600 votes.
