= Hameed Ali Shemnad =

Indian politician and lawyer (1929–2017)

- ഹമീദലി ഷംനാട്

Member of Parliament, Rajya Sabha
- In office 5 February 1970 – 21 April 1979
- Constituency: Kerala

Member of the Kerala Legislative Assembly
- In office 22 February 1960 – 10 September 1964
- Preceded by: C. H. Kanaran
- Succeeded by: E. V. Kumaran
- Constituency: Nadapuram

Personal details
- Born: 23 January 1929 Angadimogar, Kumbla, Kasaragod district, Madras Presidency, British India
- Died: 6 January 2017 (aged 87) Kasaragod, Kerala, India
- Resting place: Thayalangadi Juma Masjid Cemetery, Kasaragod
- Party: Indian Union Muslim League
- Spouse: Ummu Haleema
- Children: 3 (Raziya, Pyari, Fauziya)
- Education: St. Aloysius College, Mangalore; Madras Law College
- Profession: Lawyer, politician

Hameed Ali Shemnad (also spelled Hameed Ali Shamnad; 23 January 1929 – 6 January 2017) was an Indian lawyer and politician from Kerala. A senior leader of the Indian Union Muslim League (IUML), he served in the Kerala Legislative Assembly before going on to represent Kerala for two terms in the Rajya Sabha.

== Early life and education ==
Born on 23 January 1929 in Angadimogar (within Puthige panchayat, near Kumbla in Kasaragod), Shemnad was the son of Bellary tahsildar Abdul Khader Shemnad and Khadeeja Bee Sherool; official Kerala Legislature records list his birth in July 1929. After losing his father at the age of ten, he grew up under the care of his maternal grandfather, Khan Bahadur Mahmood Schamnad, a pre-independence political leader who served in the Central Legislative Assembly in Delhi.

Shemnad began his schooling at Badoor Government L.P. School and later attended B.E.M. School and Government Higher Secondary School in Kasaragod. He completed his college education at St. Aloysius High School and College in Mangalore before earning a Bachelor of Laws (BL) degree from Madras Law College.

== Legal career ==
After enrolling as an advocate in 1956, Shemnad started his legal practice at the Madras High Court under senior Muslim League leader B. Pocker Sahib. A few years later, he returned to Kasaragod and practiced in the local courts.

== Political career ==
Shemnad was initially drawn to the Praja Socialist Party (PSP) before joining the Indian Union Muslim League. Within the IUML, he led both the Kasaragod and Kannur district committees as president and later held key state-level offices, including State General Secretary, Vice President, and Treasurer.

In the 1960 Kerala Legislative Assembly election, Shemnad won the Nadapuram seat on a Muslim League ticket, polling 34,893 votes to defeat C. H. Kanaran of the Communist Party of India, who secured 27,846 votes. He subsequently represented Kerala in the Rajya Sabha across two terms from 1970 to 1979.
