= Kandalottu Kunhambu =

Indian politician

Kandalottu Kunhambu (8 December 1916 – 16 January 2004) was an Indian politician and leader of Communist Party of India. He represented Nadapuram constituency in 5th Kerala Legislative Assembly.

== Biography ==
Kanthalot Kunhambu was born at Pappinisseri, Kannur district, Kerala on 8 December 1916 to Pokkan.

Kunhambu joined Indian National Congress in 1932. He was arrested in 1940 and 1946 due to his trade union activities. He later joined Communist Party of India and was elected to the fifth Kerala Legislative Assembly from Nadapuram.

He had served as Minister for Forests in the governments of K. Karunakaran, A. K. Antony, and P. K. Vasudevan Nair.

Kunhambu died on 16 January 2004 at Pappinisseri, Kannur.

== Personal life ==
Kunhambu's wife P. Yashoda was a woman activist, freedom fighter and journalist. They were married in 1952. The couple had no children.
