= Shameem Faizee =

Indian politician

Shameem Faizee (1946 March 3- 2019 July 6) was an Indian politician and leader of Communist Party of India. He was a member of the National Secretrait of Communist Party of India. Also he was the editor of New Age Weekly.

He died on 6 July 2019.
