= Purameri =

- Panchayath
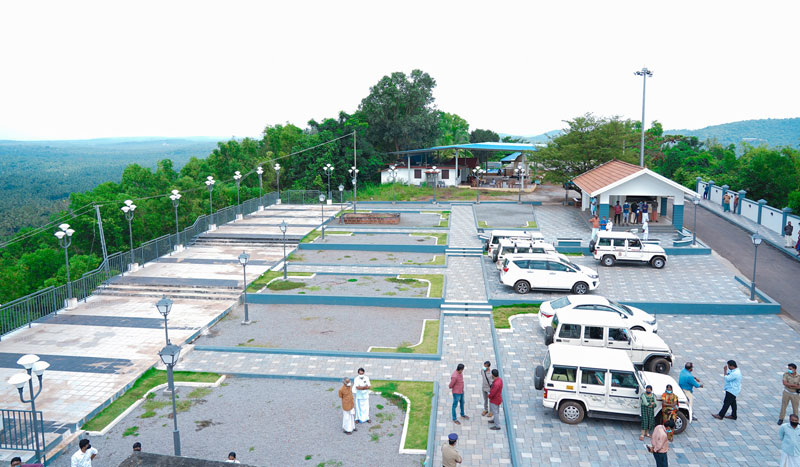
- Purameri

- Location in Kerala, India Purameri (India)
- Coordinates: 11°38′N 75°46′E
- Country: India
- State: Kerala
- District: Kozhikode

Area
  - Total: 2,027 km^{2} (783 sq mi)

Population (2011)
  - Total: 27,612
  - Density: 13.62/km^{2} (35.28/sq mi)

Languages
  - Official: Malayalam, English
- Time zone: UTC+5:30 (IST)
- PIN: 673503
- Telephone code: 0496
- Vehicle registration: KL-18
- Nearest city: Vatakara
- Literacy: 93.10%
- Lok Sabha constituency: Vatakara
- Vidhan Sabha constituency: Kuttiyadi
- Climate: Climatic regions of India Tropical Monsoon (Köppen)
- Website: www.purameri.com

Purameri is a Village Panchayat in Kozhikode district of North Malabar region in the Indian state of Kerala. It is located in the north-western part of the district, on the way from Vatakara to Nadapuram.

== Demographics ==
As of 2011 India census, Purameri had a population of 27612. Purameri has an average literacy rate of 93.10%, lower than the Kerala state average of 94.00%: female literacy is 89.91%, and male literacy is 96.94%.

== Geography ==
Purameri is located in Vatakara Taluk of Kozhikode district. It shares borders with Nadapuram to the east, Edacheri to the west, Thuneri to the south and Mayyazhipuzha to the north.
