= P. Yashoda =

Indian woman journalist

- Born: 12 February 1916; Dharmadom, Malabar district, British India
- Died: 29 July 2009 (aged 93); Kannur district, Kerala
- Other name: Yashoda Teacher
- Occupations: Journalist, Teacher, Woman activist
- Spouse: Kandalottu Kunhambu

Payyanadan Yashoda popularly known as Yashoda teacher was a woman activist, freedom fighter, journalist and teacher from Kerala, India. She is best known as the first woman reporter, first woman journalist and first woman school teacher from Kerala.

== Biography ==
Yashoda was born on 12 February 1916, the daughter of Janaki and Dharmadath Payyanadan Govindan at present-day Kannur district, Kerala. She joined Kalliasseri higher elementary school as the only woman student in the eighth standard. After passing eighth in 1930, in April, she was appointed as an untrained teacher at a school where her uncle Govindan was headmaster. She was only 15 years at the time of joining as a teacher. She trained as a teacher during the period 1933–35. She completed her high school education and became a schoolteacher at a time when female education rates were very low.

In 1939, 198 teacher certificates were revoked, including Yashoda's. If they apologized, they would be taken back. But Yashoda was not ready to apologize. She received her Elementary School Living Certificate on 8 March 1942. Yashoda attended the National Conference of the All India Women's Conference in Sindh in December 1943 and the Asiatic Women's Conference in Kolkata in 1949.

Yashoda was at the forefront of bringing women together and teaching them spinning, stitching and weaving. Along with this she also conducted literacy classes and awareness classes to woman. The women's movement started under the leadership of Yashoda Teacher later took root all over the Malabar region.

Formerly a schoolteacher, Yashoda was instrumental in the formation of the Teachers' Union in Kerala before Indian independence. The Teachers 'Struggle of 1939, led by the Malabar Teachers' Union, marked a turning point in the lives of teachers who demanded that SSLC students be given the opportunity to sit for examinations privately.

As a reporter for the pro-left newspaper Deshabhimani, Yashoda had interviewed prisoners sentenced to death at Kannur Central Jail for participating in the Kayyur agitation demanding the distribution of land to landless farmers in northern Kerala during the British rule. Yashoda Teacher is the only woman who went to see Kayyur comrades in jail.

Yashoda Teacher, the first woman reporter, first woman journalist and first woman school teacher from Kerala, was also the first woman organizer of the communist struggle in Kerala. Yashoda also acted in several plays at the time, and was also nominated for Best Actress several times. Plays in which actors and organizers all were only women became very popular.

=== Personal life and death ===
Yashoda's husband Kandalottu Kunhambu was a CPI leader and former Kerala state minister. They were married in 1952. The couple had no children. She died at her residence near Kannur on 27 July 2009.

== Legacy ==
Since 2019, the P Yasoda Women's Media Award has been presented in Yashoda's honor. The award is presented by the P Yashoda Memorial Committee and the Kerala Mahila Sangam Kannur District Committee. The award consists of Rs. 10001 and a certificate. First award was given to Nileena Atholi.
