= Richard Hay (politician) =

Indian politician

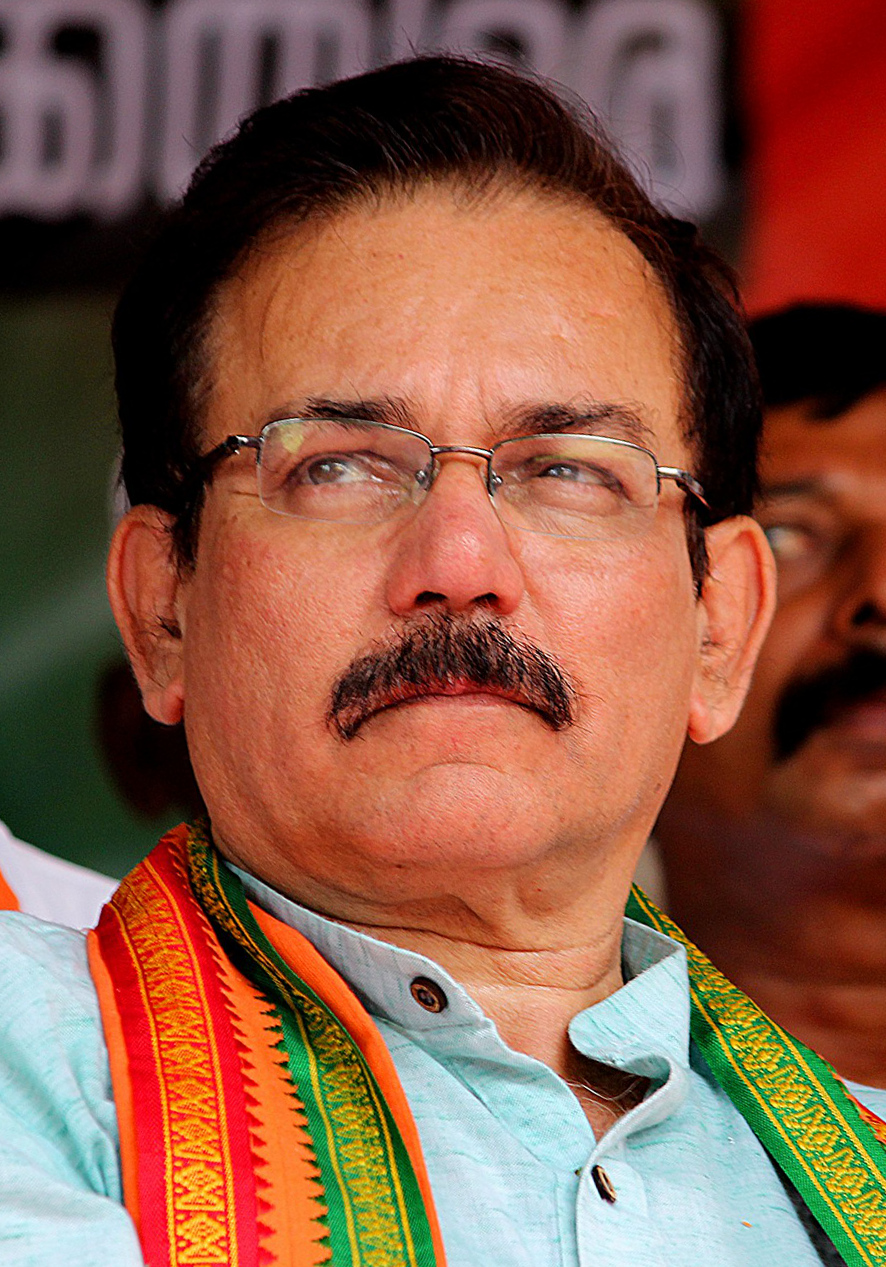

Member of the Indian Parliament for Anglo-Indian reserved seats (Kerala)
- In office 23 July 2015 – 23 May 2019

Personal details
- Born: 9 June 1952 (age 74) Thalassery, Madras State, India
- Party: Bharatiya Janata Party
- Spouse: Shakila Hay
- Education: University of Calicut
- Occupation: Politician
- Profession: Educationalist; teacher; writer; social worker; sportsperson
- Website: richardhay.in

Richard Hay (born 9 June 1952) is an Indian politician, representing Bharatiya Janata Party, and was a Member of Parliament from Kerala as a nominated member of the Lok Sabha, representing the Anglo-Indian community from 2015 to 2019.

== Early life and career ==
Richard Hay was born in Thalassery, Kerala and had his education at Holy Angels School and St. Joseph's School, Thalassery. He took his B.Com. degree from Government College, Madappally and M.Com degree from the Dept. of Commerce and Management Studies, University of Calicut and M.C.T. degree from the Dept. of Education, University of Calicut.

Richard Hay received acclaim, when as principal, he secured NAAC accreditation for four different government colleges. He was a chairman of the Malabar Heritage Society and the first chairperson of the Special Olympics International, Kerala. As member of the Lions International, Prof. Hay was elected as Lions district governor in 2003-2004. He currently serves as the President of the Latin Catholic Association, Kannur, the Vice-President of the Anglo-Indian Association and an Organiser for the Nature Clubs of India. Hay started the Campus Innovative Group, which visits colleges to motivate students and consult with them on how to develop the country. In 2015 his book, Professionalization of Teachers and Institutions, was published.

== Political career ==
Hay joined the Bharatiya Janata Party in 2014. He was appointed to the 16th Lok Sabha as one of the two appointed members representing the Anglo-Indian community. On 1 May 2016, he was appointed to the Public Accounts Committee.

== Honours ==
In 1990, the Lions International recognised Hay for 10 years of active Lion's Club service.

== Personal life ==
Richard Hay married Shakila in 1980; they have two daughters.
