= Binoy Viswam =

Indian politician (born 1955)

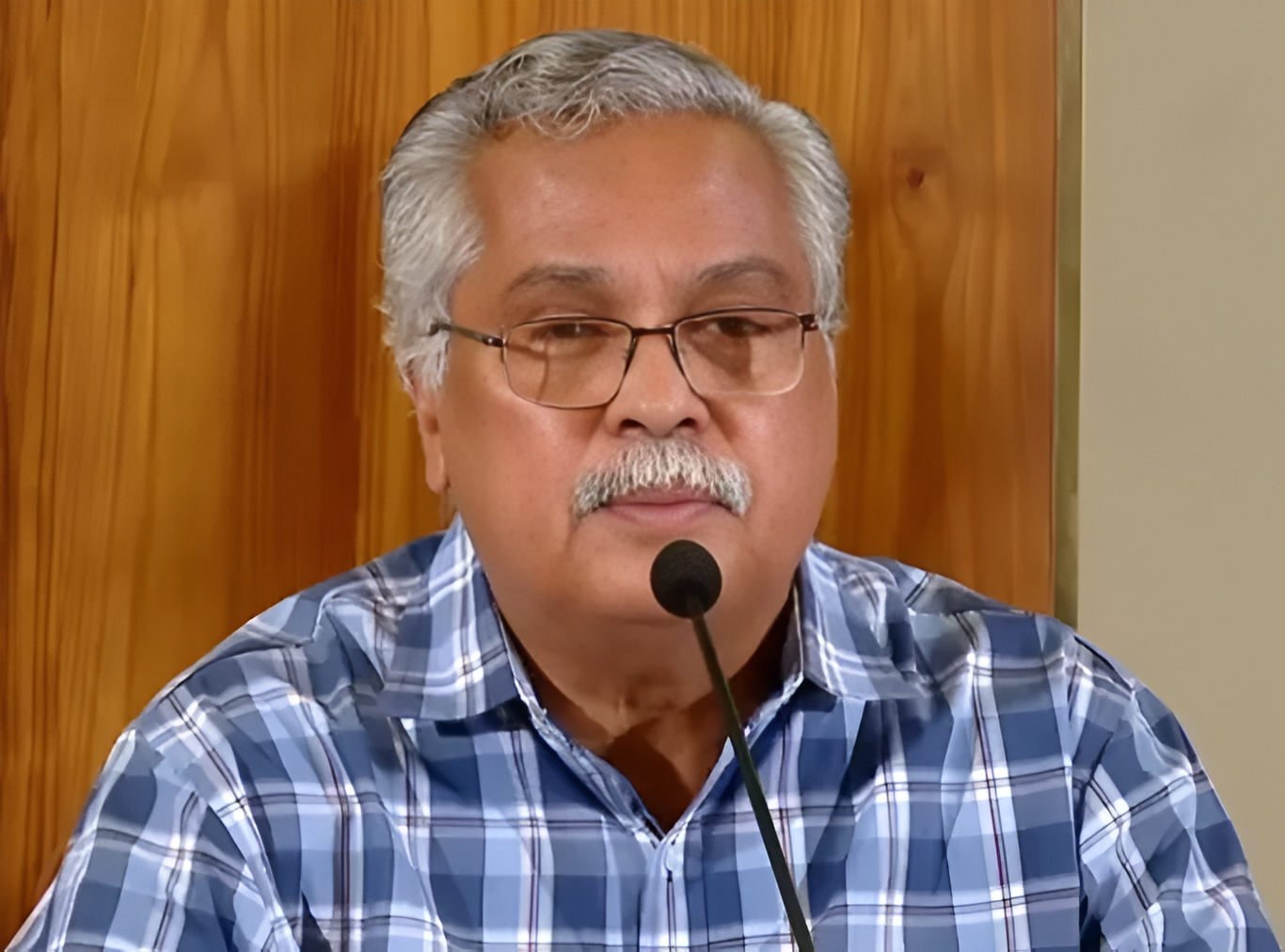

Leader of the Communist Party of India in the Rajya Sabha
- In office 24 July 2019 – 1 July 2024
- Preceded by: D. Raja

Member of Parliament of Rajya Sabha for Kerala
- In office 2 July 2018 – 1 July 2024
- Preceded by: P. J. Kurien
- Succeeded by: Jose K. Mani

Minister for Forests and Housing, Kerala
- In office 18 May 2006 – 18 May 2011
- Preceded by: A. Sujanapal
- Succeeded by: K. B. Ganesh Kumar
- Constituency: Nadapuram

Member of Legislative Assembly, Kerala
- In office 14 May 2001 – 14 May 2011
- Preceded by: Sathyan Mokeri
- Succeeded by: E. K. Vijayan
- Constituency: Nadapuram

State Secretary of the Communist Party of India, Kerala State Council
- Incumbent
- Assumed office 10 December 2023
- Preceded by: Kanam Rajendran

Personal details
- Born: 25 November 1955 (age 70) Vaikom, Kottayam district, Kerala
- Party: Communist Party of India
- Spouse: Shaila George
- Children: 2

Binoy Viswam is an Indian politician who was the Member of Parliament of the Rajya Sabha from Kerala from 2019 until 2024. Viswam was a member of the Communist Party of India (CPI) and its Parliamentary Party leader.

A member of the CPI's National Secretariat, he is currently the State Secretary of CPI Kerala State Committee, the Editor of New Age Weekly - the central organ of CPI and the Working President of the All India Trade Union Congress. He is a senior Communist Party of India (CPI) leader and the president of the Kerala Tourism Development Corporation Employees' Federation.

Before parliament, Viswam was elected to the Kerala Legislative Assembly from Nadapuram constituency between 2001 and 2011, serving as a member of the Estimates Committee and chairman of the Assurance Committee. He was one of the five members of the Constituency Delimitation Committee. Viswam served as the Minister for Forests and Housing in the Government of Kerala from 2006–2011.

== Early life and political career ==
Viswam was born on 25 November 1955 to C.K. Viswanathan and Omana in Vaikom, Kottayam. He entered politics from his school days through the All India Students Federation (AISF) as Unit Secretary of AISF in Vaikom Government Boys High School. He was also elected as Union Chairman of St. Paul's College, Kalamassery. He was elected as a member of the Kerala University Union and a syndicate member of Cochin University of Science and Technology.

Later he became State President and All India Secretary of AISF. He was also elected as State Secretary of the All India Youth Federation (AIYF). He served as vice president of the World Federation of Democratic Youth (WFDY) and also head of its Asia Pacific Commission. He became a CPI member at the age of 18. He was a member of the National Council of CPI during the period 1992–98. He also served as a Kerala Agricultural University Senate Member and a Director Board Member of the KTDC. After the demise of Kanam Rajendran, he was elected as the secretary of the CPI Kerala state committee in 2023.

== Personal life ==
Binoy Viswam is married to Shaila George, who worked at the Kerala Gramin Bank as an officer in Thiruvananthapuram. She completed a course in creative writing at the University of Nottingham. Both Binoy and Shaila are the children of two prominent Communist Party leaders. Binoy is the son of C.K. Viswanathan, who was a leader of the Communist Party of India. He was the assistant secretary of its state committee and is a well-known campaigner and strategist. Shaila is the daughter of Mary Koothattukulam, a party leader turned teacher. The couple has two daughters.

== See also ==
- Kerala Council of Ministers
