= Kallachi =

Town in Kozhikode district, Kerala, India

- Town
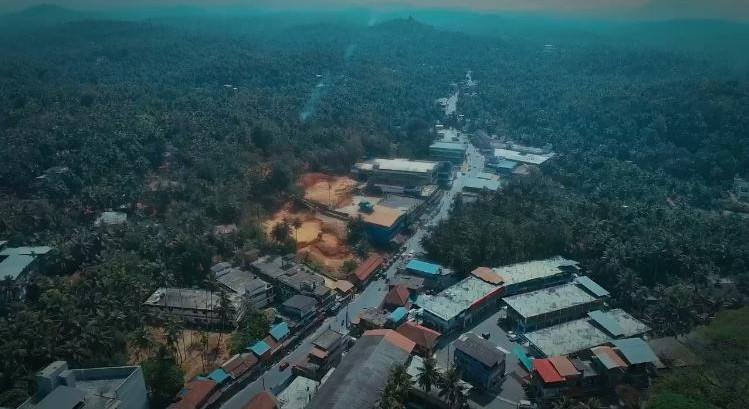

- Location in Kerala, India Kallachi (India)
- Coordinates: 11.6863°N 75.6775°E
- Country: India
- State: Kerala
- Region: North Malabar
- District: Kozhikode

Languages
  - Official: Malayalam, English
- Time zone: UTC+5:30 (IST)
- Telephone code: 0496
- Vehicle registration: KL 18
- Nearest city: Vatakara
- Lok Sabha constituency: Vatakara

Kallachi is a major town in Nadapuram panchayath, Kozhikode district, Kerala, India.

== Educational institutions ==
The College of Applied Science (IHRD) and the GHSS Kallachi are in Kallachi.
