= K. T. Kanaran =

Indian politician

K. T. Kanaran (6 June 1932 – 6 April 2006) was an Indian politician and leader of Communist Party of India. He represented Nadapuram constituency in 6th and 7th Kerala Legislative Assembly.
