= Government College, Madappally =

- Type: State Government College
- Established: 1958; 68 years ago
- Affiliations: University of Calicut
- Location: College Road, Madappallly, Vatakara Kozhikode, Kerala, 673102, India; 11.6489532°N 75.5690772°E
- Campus: Urban
- Website: Government College, Madappally
- Location in Kerala Government College, Madappally (India)

Government College, Madappally (known as Madappally College) is an affiliated college to the University of Calicut, located on a green-clad hillock near Madappally, north of Vatakara town.

== About college ==
This college has turned to be the hub of higher education in North Kerala. The college was established in 1958, which was then affiliated to the University of Kerala. Later college was shifted to a new building with new courses in 1963. In 1968, the college was separated from the University of Kerala and affiliated to the University of Calicut.

== Courses ==
MA 1. History 2. Political Science 3. English

MSc 1. Physics 2. Chemistry 3. Zoology

M.Com

BA 1. History with General Economics & Political Science (Sub) 60 2. English with Social and Cultural History of Britain & World History (Sub) 20 3. Economics with political science & Modern Indian History (Sub) 40 4. Politics with General Economics & World History(Sub) 40

BSc 1. Physics with Maths & Chemistry (Sub) 24 2. Chemistry with Maths & Physics (Sub) 24 3. Botany with Chemistry & Zoology (Sub) 24 4. Zoology with Chemistry & Botany (Sub) 24 5. Mathematics with Statistics & Physics (sub) 20

BCom 1. With A II Finance 60

== Notable alumni ==
- Mullappally Ramachandran
- Richard Hay
- Punathil Kunjabdulla
- Akbar Kakkattil
- Rajan Gurukkal
- Suveeran
- V. R. Sudheesh
- K. P. Satheesh Chandran
- V. T. Murali

== See also ==
- Education in India
- Education in Kerala
- Madappally, Vatakara
- List of institutions of higher education in Kerala
- List of colleges affiliated to the University of Calicut
