= New Age Weekly =

Communist periodicals published in India

New Age
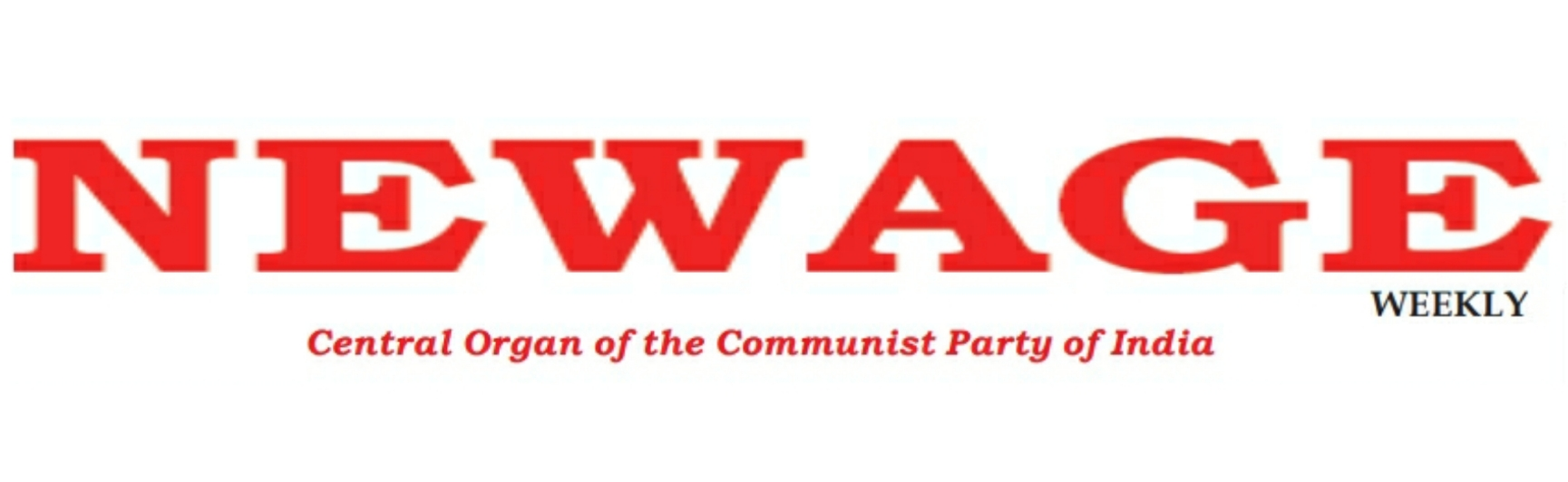
- Type: Weekly newspaper
- Format: Print
- Owner: Communist Party of India
- Publisher: D. Raja
- Editor: Binoy Viswam
- Founded: 1934; 92 years ago
- Political alignment: Left-wing
- Language: English
- Headquarters: New Delhi
- Country: India
- Website: newagemukti.com

The New Age is the central organ of the Communist Party of India. The first editor was S. V. Ghate and started in 1934 as a monthly journal. Binoy Viswam is the current editor of New Age Weekly.

== Columns ==
=== Education ===
Study and Struggle Authored by C. Adhikesavan

=== International ===
Diary of International Events. Authored by C. Adhikesavan.

Other columns include Current Issues and Book Reviews.

- Glimpses from the Lives of Our Great Leaders

Authored by Anil Rajimwale

- What the Others Say
- On Records
