= Maruthonkara =

Maruthonkara Mullankunnu Marudonkara
- village
- Location in Kerala, India Maruthonkara (India)
- Coordinates: 11°38′20″N 75°49′10″E
- Country: India
- State: Kerala
- District: Kozhikode

Population (2011)
  - Total: 23,487

Languages
  - Official: Malayalam, English
- Time zone: UTC+5:30 (IST)
- Telephone code: 0496
- Vehicle registration: KL-77(SRTO Perambra)
- Nearest city: Calicut
- Lok Sabha constituency: Vadakara
- Vidhan Sabha constituency: Nadapuram
- Website: www.maruthonkara.com

Maruthonkara is a village and grama panchayat in Kozhikode district in the state of Kerala, India.

== Demographics ==
As of 2011 Indian census, Maruthonkara had a population of 23487 with 11306 males and 12181 females.
