= Muslim Students Federation =

Muslim Students Federation (MSF) may refer to:

- All India Muslim Students Federation, the student wing of All-India Muslim League
- Muslim Students Federation (Indian Union Muslim League), the student wing of Indian Union Muslim League
  - Muslim Students Federation (Kerala unit)
