= Valayam =

- town
- Location in Kerala, India Valayam (India)
- Coordinates: 11°43′17″N 75°40′11″E
- Country: India
- State: Kerala
- District: Kozhikode

Population (2011)
  - Total: 14,328

Languages
  - Official: Malayalam, English
- Time zone: UTC+5:30 (IST)
- PIN: 673517
- Telephone code: 0496246
- Vehicle registration: KL-11,KL-18
- Nearest city: Vatakara
- Lok Sabha constituency: Vatakara
- Vidhan Sabha constituency: Nadapuram

Valayam is a town in Kozhikode district in the state of Kerala, India.

== Etymology ==
The Panchayat is said to have acquired its name 'Valayam', meaning 'circle', as the place is surrounded by hills and mountains. The Panchayat was formed in the year 1978, carved out from the Vanimel Panchayat.

== Temples ==
1. Thikuni Muthappan Temple
2. Chekkotta Bhagavathy temple
3. Paradevatha Temple

== Demographics ==
As of 2011 India census, Valayam had a population of 14328 with 6801 males and 7527 females.

== Education ==
1. valayam higher secondary school
2. Valayam U P School
3. Industrial Training Institute
4. Valayam north LP school
5. Poovamvazhal LP school

== Transportation ==
Valayam village connects to other parts of India through Vatakara city on the west and Kuttiady town on the east. National highway No.66 passes through Vatakara and the northern stretch connects to Mangalore, Goa and Mumbai. The southern stretch connects to Cochin and Trivandrum. The eastern Highway going through Kuttiady connects to Mananthavady, Mysore and Bangalore. The nearest airports are at Kannur and Kozhikode. The nearest railway station is at Vatakara.

== Social condition ==
Valayam has a reputation for intermittent political conflicts between Muslim league workers and Communists. Many people were killed in the last few years and there is recurrence of violence on a daily basis there and in nearby villages. Normal business and travel has been hampered in this area because of frequent street fights and agitations. On 24 January 2015, one communist volunteer called P. Shibin was murdered by a Muslim league worker in a local dispute. The police issued prohibitory orders in violent areas like Nadapuram, Valayam, Kuttiady and Edachery.

The police are not effective in this area because the number of security personnel deployed is only ten percent of the perpetrators of the violence.

Nowadays there is no political conflicts and street fights. The police and political leaders are succeeded in controlling the violence and making a friendly atmosphere. The panjayath has developed a lot during the period of pinarayi government. The primary health centre and government higher secondary school has become international level.
