= Akbar Kakkattil =

Indian short story writer and novelist (1954–2026)

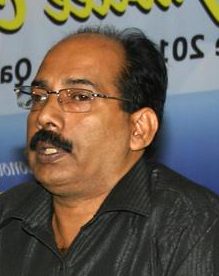
Akbar Kakkattil

Akbar Kakkattil (7 July 1954 – 17 February 2016) was an Indian short-story writer and novelist from Kerala state.

== Life ==
Akbar was born on 7 July 1954 at Kakkattil in Vadakara as the only son out of the two children of his parents, Sri. P. Abdulla and Smt. Kunjhamina. He completed his school education from Parayil L P School, Kakkattil, and Sanskrit Secondary School Vattoli. He spent the first half of the first year pre-degree at Farook College, Calicut and studied up to degree course in English Language and Literature at Government College, Madappally. The first year of P G course in Malayalam Language & Literature he studied at Sree Kerala Varma College, Thrissur and again moved to Government Brennen College, Thalassery to complete the course. He took his Bachelor of Education degree from Government Brennen College Of Teacher Education, Thalassery. While studying he was elected chairman of College Union both at Government College, Madappally Vadakara & Government Brennen College Of Teacher Education, Thalassery. He was also executive member of University Union of Calicut University. He has served as a Malayalam teacher for about 30 years in various schools, including National Higher Secondary School, Vattoli, where he worked for a long period.

Akbar Kakkattil has worked as a member of the governing body of South Zone Cultural Centre of Central Government of India and Kerala State Institute of Children's literature. He has also served as member of the curriculum steering committee, Kerala Lalitha Kala Akademi, State Television Jury, State Cinema jury, Ezhuthachan Puraskara Samiti and Programme Advisory Board of Akashavani, Kozhikkode. Besides he has worked as an honorary editor of Malayalam Publications and Olive Publications, Kozhikode. He had been a permanent jury member of the first educational reality show in Kerala, Haritha Vidyalaya. He was also a member of Malayalam Advisory Board of Kendra Sahitya Akademi and Convener of Publication Committee, Kerala Sahitya Akademi. He was the vice president of the Kerala Sahitya Academi and a member of Malayalam Advisory Panel of National Book Trust, Govt. of India and Malayalam Advisory Board, Govt of Kerala. He was also a member of State Literacy Mission's Magazine Aksharakairali Editorial Board and Curriculum Committee of National Institute of Open Schooling (NIOS), Govt. of India. Akbar Kakkattil has also served as a part of the committee for the revision of Malayalam text books from the primary to the higher secondary level. Right from his college days he has been associated with the Film Society movements. He died on 17 February 2016.

== Literary life ==
Akbar Kakkattil turned to creative writing at the age of fourteen by publishing short stories in a regular column for children in the leading Malayalam weekly Mathrubhumi. He got published his first story Pothichoru in 1969 through the weekly. He maintained his connection with G. Sankara Kurup, Thakazhi and Basheer. He has a collection of works to his credit that comprises 54 books. They include four novels, seven collections of novelettes, twenty-seven anthologies of short stories, six collections of essays, memoirs, a play and a volume of critical essays and interviews with the leading writers of Malayalam. He has received the Kerala Sahitya Akademi Award twice. The first ever award in humour section in 1992 for his School Diary- an anthology of short essays and in the year 2004, 'Vadakkuninnoru Kudumba Vrithantham' was awarded as the best novel. He has also been honoured twice by the State Government – in the year 1998, his work 'Sthrynam' was awarded the Joseph Mundassery Award for the best Novel. The Television Award for the best story writer (School Diary – Doordarsan serial) for the year 2002 also went to him.

The fellowship of Literature from the Government of India was bestowed on him in the year 1992. The Abu Dhabi Sakthi Award was received by him in the year 2002. Besides, he has been awarded the S K Pottakkad award, Ankanam Award, Malayala Manorama Prize, Rajiv Gandhi Peace Foundation Award, C H Muhammed Koya Award, T V Kochubaava Award, V Sambasivan Puraskar and Dubai Book Trust Award etc.

His selected stories includes 'Addiction, Achanum Makalum, Samasya, Avasanam, Oru Thenginte Darsanam, Verum Avarthanam, Sourayoodham, Aanakkariyam and Anthya Dinam' are translated to English by P A Noushad and Arun Lal Mokeri. Both translators are natives and intimates of Akbar. “Akbar Mash himself had expressed his satisfaction over the translation," said Noushad.

His book on Adoor Gopalakrishnan titled Varoo Adoorileykku Pokam is translated to Tamil ("Adoor Gopalakrishnan – Idam Porul Kalai) and his novel Mrithyuyogam is translated to Kannada (Mrithyuyoga).

== Works ==
Short-story

- 1978 – Ee Vazhi Vannavar
- 1982 – Medhaswam
- 1986– Shameelafahmi
- 1989 – Adhyapaka Kathakal
- 1991– Kadarkutty Utharav
- 1992 – Aaram Kalam
- 1994 – Veedinu Thee Pidikkunnu
- 1995 – Aakaasathinte Athirukal
- 1996 – Naadaapuram
- 1999 – Veentum Narangnga Muricchappol
- 1999 – Therenjetuttha Kathakal
- 2000 – Oru Vayanakariyute Aavalathikal
- 2001 – Cheriya Kathakal
- 2003 – Mayakkannan
- 2005 – Sesham Screenil
- 2006 – Shreepriyayute Aadhikal
- 2007 – Jeansitta Penkuttiye Ottaykku Kittiyal Enthu Cheyyanam?
- 2008 – Kathakal – Therenjetuttha Kathakal
- 2009 – Njangal Liba Johnine Pedikkunnu
- 2009 – Puthiya Vaathilukal
- 2009 – Durbar
- 2010 – Aalperumattam
- 2011 – Mailanchikkaatt
- 2011 – Sthreelingam (Selected Works)
- 2012 – 2011-le 'Aan' kutti
- 2014 - Kannichuvatukal ( Ee Vazhi Vannavarum Medhaswavum)
- 2014 - Ippol Undakunnath

Novelette

- 1982 – Randum Rand
- 1993 – Moonnum Moonn
- 1994 – Oru Vivahithante Chila Swakarya Nimishangal
- 2001 – Dharma Sankadangngalude Rajavu
- 2005 – Pathinonnu Novelettukal
- 2010 – Jiyad Gold Poovitumpol
- 2010 – Keerthana

Novels

- 1989 – Mruthyu Yogam
- 1995 – Strainam
- 1997 – Harithaabhakalkkapuram
- 2001 – Vadakkuninnoru Kudumba Vrithaantham
- 2012 – Akbar Kakkattilinte Naalu Novelukal

Essays

- 1979 – Prarthanayum Perunnalum
- 1989 – School Diary
- 2010 – Anubhavam Orma Yathra
- 2010 – Punathilum Njanum Pinne Kavya Madhavanum
- 2014 - A Penkutti Ippol Evide?
- 2014 - Nakshathrangalute Chiri

Criticism, Life-sketch, Interview

- 1993 – Sargasameeksha
- 2014 - Namude M T

Memoirs

- 1993 – Adhyayana Yathra

Play

- 1996 – Kunjhi Moosa Vivaahithanaavunnu

Cinema

- 2006 – Varoo Adoorileykk Pokaam
- 2009 – Inganeyum Oru Cinemakkaalam

Children's literature

- 2008 – Nokkoo, Ayal Ningngalil Thanneyund

Service Story

- 2010 – Padham Muppath

Travelogue

- 2011 – Kakkattil Yathrayilanu

== Awards and honours ==
- Merit Scholarship for Sanskrit by state government (1967–'70)
- Malayala Manorama Prize for Essay Writing (1971)
- Calicut University Union Prize for Novel (1974)
- Ankanam literary Award for 'Shameelafahmi' (1987)
- S K Pottekkatt Award for "Mrithyuyogam' (1991)
- Indian Government Fellowship for Literature (1992)
- Kerala Sahithya Academy Awards for 'School Diary (1992) and 'Vadakku Ninnoru Kutumbavrithantham' (2003)
- CH Muhammed Koya memorial Award for 'Sarga Sameeksha' (1995)
- Joseph Mundasseri Award for 'Sthrainam' (1998)
- State Television Award for best story (School Diary 2000)
- Abu Dhabi Sakthi Award (Novel) for 'Vadakku Ninnoru Kutumbavrithantham' (2002)
- Rajeev Gandhi Peace Foundation Award for 'Selected Stories' (2003)
- Gramadeepam Award (2005)
- T V Kochubava Award (2006)
- V Sambasivan Award (2008)
- Gulf Malayali Dot Com Award (2010)
- Wise men international Excellence Award (2010)
- Dubai Pravasi Book Trust Award (2012)
- First Academic Council Award of Kerala Aided Higher Secondary Association (2013).

== See also ==
- Malayalam literature
- List of Malayalam-language authors
