= K. M. Abhijith =

1. REDIRECT 2026 Kerala Legislative Assembly election
