= Narippatta =

Narippatta Kaiveli
- village
- Location in Kerala, India Narippatta (India)
- Coordinates: 11°41′50″N 75°43′5″E
- Country: India
- State: Kerala
- District: Kozhikode

Population (2011)
  - Total: 21,381

Languages
  - Official: Malayalam, English
- Time zone: UTC+5:30 (IST)
- PIN: 673507
- Telephone code: 0496
- Vehicle registration: KL-18
- Nearest city: Vatakara
- Literacy: 87% aria 50.63km2%

Narippatta is a village in Kozhikode district in the state of Kerala, India.

== Demographics ==
As of 2011 India census, Narippatta had a population of 21,381 with 10,045 males and 11,336 females.
