= Edacheri =

Edachery
- Town
- Location in Kerala, India Edachery (India)
- Coordinates: 11.6625057°N 75.596466°E
- Country: India
- State: Kerala
- Region: North Malabar
- District: Kozhikode

Languages
  - Official: Malayalam, English
- Time zone: UTC+5:30 (IST)
- PIN: 673502
- Telephone code: 0496
- Vehicle registration: KL 18
- Nearest city: Vatakara
- Lok Sabha constituency: Vatakara

Edacheri is a small panchayath in the district of Kozhikode in the South Indian state of Kerala.

== Location ==
It is part of the North Malabar province of Kerala, and is situated east of Vatakara. Purameri Panchayat borders it to the east, Eramala Panjayath to the west and the Mahe river to the north.

== In the news ==
The village was in the news in December 2021, when a Kannur man and his wife, avoided anextravagant wedding for his daughter and married off five other girls setting a model.

== Administration ==
Edacheri is in the Nadapuram constituency and has a strong leftist political history. The panchayat has always been majority LDF (Left Democratic Front) since its inception.

== Demographics ==
The panchayat has a mixed population. Hindus constitute the majority. There is also a large Muslim population.

== Economy ==
There are no major industries in Edacheri and migration to the Middle East (Gulf) and the major cities in India is prevalent. There is a saliya-theruvu (weaver's street) where weaving is an important occupation. There are granite quarries in the Panchayat where granite mining is carried out.

== Community ==
The majority of the people here are Hindus belonging to the Thiyya or other lower castes of the Hindus. Nevertheless, a significant portion of Edacheri is also constituted by Nambudiri, and muslim belongs to Mappila sect.

== Law enforcement ==
The Edacheri Police, a division of Kerala Police, is the police agency responsible for law enforcement and investigations within Edacheri as well as nearby towns such as Orkkatteri and Thalayi and the surrounding area.

== Transportation ==
Edacheri connects to other parts of India through Vatakara city on the west and Kuttiady town on the east. National Highway 66 passes through Vatakara and the northern stretch connects to Mangalore, Goa and Mumbai. The southern stretch connects to Cochin and Trivandrum. The eastern highway going through Kuttiady connects to Mananthavady, Mysore and Bangalore. The nearest airports are at Kannur and Kozhikode. The nearest railway station is at Vatakara.

The public KSRTC buses are mostly depended on for transport. KSRTC bus service to Wayanad from Vadakara has two stops at Edachery and Thalayi. Private buses to Thrissur, Kozhikkode, Vadakara, Iringannur, Nadapuram, Kuttiadi, Thottilpalam, Valayam, Parakkadavu, and Kakkattil are accessible from Edachery. There is a limited stop bus stop as well for long route buses.

== See also ==
- Vatakara
- Nadapuram
