= Sathyan Mokeri =

Indian politician (born 1953)

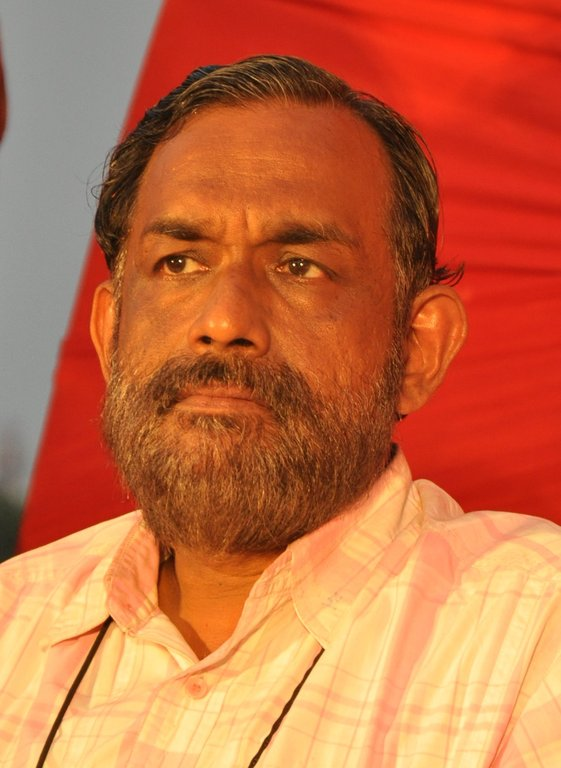

Member of the Kerala Legislative Assembly
- In office 1987–2001
- Preceded by: K. T. Kanaran
- Succeeded by: Binoy Viswam
- Constituency: Nadapuram

Personal details
- Born: 2 October 1953 (age 72)
- Party: Communist Party of India
- Spouse: P. Vasantham
- Children: 1 son, 1 daughter
- Parent: P. Kelappan Nair (father)
- Education: BA Sociology
- Occupation: Journalist; Politician
- Won award for the Best Young Parliamentarian instituted in the name of Speaker of first Kerala Assembly K. Sankaranayanan Thampi

Sathyan Mokeri (born 2 October 1953) is an Indian communist Journalist and politician. He represented Nadapuram constituency in the Kerala Legislative Assembly from 1987 to 2001, being elected thrice. In 2015, he was elected the Assistant Secretary of Communist Party of India Kerala State Committee. He has been convicted in two criminal cases; one in 2015 where he was fined Rs. 200, and another in 2024 where he was fined Rs. 1450.

== Education ==
In 1980, Mokeri obtained a Bachelor of Arts in Sociology from the Malayalam University of Calicut.

== Positions held ==
- Member, Calicut University Senate
- Member, CPI State Executive Committee
- President, AISF, Kozhikode District Committee and State Committee
- Secretary and President, AIYF Kerala State Committee
- Vice President, AIYF National Council,
- Vice President, All India Kisan Sabha State Committee

== Electoral History ==
2024 by-election: Wayanad
Party	Candidate	Votes	%	±%
INC	Priyanka Gandhi	622,338	64.99	▲5.3
CPI	Sathyan Mokeri	2,11,407	22.08	▼4.01
BJP	Navya Haridas	1,09,939	11.48	▼1.51
NOTA	None of the above	5,406	0.57	▼0.5
Majority		4,10,931	42.9	▲9.32
Turnout		9,57,571	64.22	▼9.35
INC hold		Swing		
