= C. H. Kanaran =

Indian politician (1909–1972)

State Secretary of the Communist Party of India (Marxist), Kerala
- In office 1964–1972
- Preceded by: Position established
- Succeeded by: E. K. Nayanar

Member of the Kerala Legislative Assembly
- In office 1965–1967
- Preceded by: Hameed Ali Shemnad
- Succeeded by: E. V. Kumaran
- Constituency: Nadapuram
- In office 1957–1960
- Preceded by: Constituency established
- Succeeded by: Hameed Ali Shemnad
- Constituency: Nadapuram

Personal details
- Born: Missing required parameter 1=month! 1909 Azhiyur, Kozhikode district, Kerala, British India
- Died: 20 October 1972 (aged 62–63)
- Party: Communist Party of India (Marxist)
- Spouse: Parvati

C. H. Kanaran (1909 – 20 October 1972) was a political leader who represented the Nadapuram constituency in the 1st Kerala Legislative Assembly. He entered the Kerala Legislative Assembly as a CPI representative. He worked as a teacher in his early days. C.H. Kanaran was a member of the Madras Legislative Assembly from 1951–56. After the formation of the CPI(M), he was the state secretary of the party for a long time.

He had shown interest in national struggles even during his school days. He was a complete rationalist. When the Congress Socialist Party started building peasant organizations, he withdrew from the rationalist campaign and started organizing the peasants. He won the elections to the Madras Legislative Assembly in 1946. He spent a long time in hiding during the period when the Communist Party was banned. He was arrested in 1948. When the party split, he stood firmly with the CPI(M). He died in 1972.

== Early years ==
He was born in 1909 in Azhiyur, Kozhikode district, to Ananthan, a small trader, and Cheekoli Karayi Narayani. He received his primary education at a government school in Punnole. Kanaran, who passed his matriculation in 1929 from Thalassery B.E.M.P. School, became active in the freedom struggle immediately. Even during his school days, CH was interested in extracurricular activities.

== Political struggle ==
In 1932, Kanaran also became an active participant in the Non-Cooperation Movement led by Gandhiji. During this time, he had to serve a 13-month prison sentence for speaking against the British government. During his imprisonment, Kanaran was able to get to know many leaders. After his release from prison, he worked as a teacher. During this period, he organized rationalists and formed the Free Thought Society. It was a time when socialist thought was spreading in Kerala. CH was also attracted to the socialist movement that emerged under the leadership of EMS and P. Krishna Pillai.

He organized the beedi workers of Thalassery and led a procession from Thalassery to Kuttiadi in 1936-37 . This was the first strike led by CH. It was the organizational activities led by Kanaran that transformed the Thalassery beedi workers' union into a class organization. The strikes conducted at the New Darbar beedi company elevated him to a prominent leader among the workers. Following this strike, Kanaran had to spend time in jail. Kanaran took a leading position in many peasant struggles that took place in North Kerala.

== Communist Movement ==
CH, who was imprisoned following the strike at the New Darbar Beedi Company, came out with the new ideas of communism in mind. At that time, all socialist thinkers in Kerala were converting to communism. CH and P. Krishna Pillai represented Kerala in the party plenum held in Bombay in 1942. In 1946, he won the election to the Madras Legislative Assembly. When the Communist Party was banned in the country following the Second Congress in 1948, CH also went into hiding. In 1957, he won from the Nadapuram constituency and entered the first Kerala Legislative Assembly. CH was one of the main architects of the Land Reforms Act passed by the first Kerala Legislative Assembly.

When the party split in 1964, C.H. was one of the 32 members who left the National Council and formed the CPI(M). He remained steadfast with the party since then. His organizational skills also helped to keep the members in the CPI(M). The state conference held prior to the 7th Congress elected Kanaran as the state secretary. He also served as the CPM state secretary from 1964 to 1972. When the party was banned following the 7th Congress, Kanaran was also imprisoned. While in prison, he contested and won the general elections held during his imprisonment, but could not serve as a member of the legislature as the legislature was not in session.

His wife was Parvati, and they had two sons and two daughters.

The centenary celebrations of CH were inaugurated by CPI(M) General Secretary Prakash Karat at a function held at the Town Hall in Thalassery on 29 July 2009.
