= Kayakkodi =

- village
- Location in Kerala, India Kayakkodi (India)
- Coordinates: 11°41′3″N 75°44′51″E
- Country: India
- State: Kerala
- District: Kozhikode

Population (2011)
  - Total: 24,578

Language = Malayalam
- Time zone: UTC+5:30 (IST)
- PIN: 673508
- Vehicle registration: KL- 18
- Nearest city: Kuttiady
- Lok Sabha constituency: Vatakara

Kayakkodi is a village in Kozhikode district in the state of Kerala, India.

== Etymology ==
The name Kayakkodi (Malayalam: കായക്കൊടി) comes from two Malayalam words: kaya (fruit) and kodi (vine or boundary). Historian Hysom Nawas point to two likely origins. One is the thick growth of wild, fruit-bearing vines that covered these eastern slopes before the land was cleared for farming. The other links kodi to old boundary markers once used to separate forest land from settled estates.

== Early Settlements and Local Principalities (12th–18th Centuries) ==
Between the 12th and 18th centuries, following the decline of the Chera dynasty, the upland belt around Kayakkodi lay along the borderland between the Kurumbranad (Kurumbiathiri Swaroopam) and Kadathanadu principalities. While the Kurumbranad dynasty controlled the inland stretches running from the coast through Perambra and Kuttiady toward the Wayanad hills, the Kadathanadu chieftains (Vazhunnavars) consolidated control over the northern Vatakara–Nadapuram belt by the 17th century.

Rather than serving as a political seat, Kayakkodi functioned as a rural frontier governed through local chieftains and Moopil Nairs. Social life in these early settlements centered around local religious institutions—such as the Varikoli Thirumeni Temple and historic mosques along the Deverkovil–Nadapuram route like Kayakodi Old Juma Mosque, Mokeri Juma Mosque, Talikara Mosque, Kodakkal Juma Mosque and Nenol Thaya Mosque—alongside the martial traditions of Kalaripayattu, which flourished across both Kurumbranad and Kadathanadu throughout the 16th and 17th centuries.

== Mysorean and British Rule (1766–1947) ==
In the late 18th century, between 1766 and 1792, the Mysore rulers Hyder Ali and Tipu Sultan brought the region's principalities and eastern uplands under their administration. Their government introduced systematic land surveys, direct tax collection, and new road links, which undercut the authority of local chieftains.

After the Treaty of Srirangapatam in 1792, Mysore ceded Malabar to the English East India Company. Under the Madras Presidency, Kayakkodi was administered as part of the sprawling Kurumbranad Taluk within the Malabar District. Because the village sits just west of Kuttiady at the foot of the Kuttiady Pass (Pakranthalam Churam), the surrounding belt served as an active route for spice caravans, timber, and troops moving between the coastal ports of Vatakara and Mahe and the Wayanad plateau—particularly between 1793 and 1805 during the resistance led by Pazhassi Raja (a scion of the western branch of the Kurumbranad–Kottayam royal line).

During the 19th century under British administration, land control was restructured through the Jenmi system, which granted absolute legal ownership of large estates to British loyal families around Thaleekkara, Mokeri, and neighboring Nadapuram, who in turn leased the paddy fields and hillside plots to tenant farmers (Kudiyans). Under this colonial land-lease setup, commercial cash-crop farming gradually spread across the foothills.

== 20th-Century Shifts and Panchayati Raj (1900–Present) ==
Between the 1920s and 1950s, steady migration into the eastern hills changed Kayakkodi's landscape. Farmers cleared scrubland in pockets like Nedumannoor, Paloly, and Kovukkunnu to grow pepper, coconut, areca nut, and rubber. At the same time, peasant movements (Karshaka Sangham) from the 1930s through the 1950s—culminating in the Kerala Land Reforms Acts of 1963 and 1969—ended the British-era Jenmi lease system and transferred land ownership directly to the families who farmed it.

Following Indian independence in 1947 and the States Reorganisation Act of 1956, Malabar merged with Travancore-Cochin to form Kerala, and the old Kurumbranad Taluk was split into Vatakara and Koyilandy taluks in 1957, placing Kayakkodi in Vatakara taluk of Kozhikode district. Under the Panchayati Raj system, the area was constituted as the Kayakkodi Grama Panchayat within the Kunnummal Block Panchayat. Covering 28.14 km², the panchayat operates out of its headquarters in Thaleekkara and includes local centers such as Kayakkodi, Thaleekkara, Mokeri, Deverkovil, Changaramkulam, and Palayad.

== Demographics ==
As of 2011 India census, Kayakkodi had a population of 24578 with 11627 males and 12951 females.

== Transportation ==
Kayakkodi village connects to other parts of India through Vatakara town on the west and Kuttiady town on the east. National highway No.66 passes through Vatakara and the northern stretch connects to Mangalore, Goa and Mumbai. The southern stretch connects to Cochin and Trivandrum. The eastern state Highway No.54 going through Kuttiady connects to Mananthavady, Mysore and Bangalore. The nearest airports are at Kannur and Kozhikode. The nearest railway station is at Vatakara.

== Notable Personalities ==
- Haneef Kayakkodi – Islamic scholar, educator, and orator known for his public lectures and television discussions on Islamic theology and religious movements in Kerala.
- Koushik S. Vinod – Malayalam playback singer and stage performer who gained recognition as a contestant on the television reality show Top Singer.
