= E. K. Vijayan =

Indian politician

E.K. Vijayan
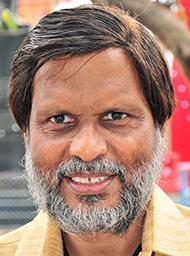
- E.K Vijayan

Member of the Kerala Legislative Assembly
- In office 2011–2026
- Constituency: Nadapuram

Personal details
- Born: 2 January 1953 (age 73) Muthuvanna
- Party: Communist Party of India
- Spouse: Anitha P
- Children: 2

E. K. Vijayan is the member of 14th Kerala Legislative Assembly. He is from the Communist Party of India and represents Nadapuram constituency.

== Political life ==
He started his political life as the district secretary of All India Students' Federation. Presently, he is the president of motor vehicle workers' union and member of the state council of Communist Party of India in Kerala.

== Personal life ==
He was born on 2 January 1953 at Muthuvana. His father is T.V Balakrishnan Kidavu and mother is E. K Kamalakshi Amma. He is married to P. Anitha. He has got two sons Arjun E K and Ajay E K.
