= Thuneri =

Thuneri Thuneri
- village
- Location in Kerala, India Thuneri (India)
- Coordinates: 11°41′0″N 75°37′0″E
- Country: India
- State: Kerala
- District: Kozhikode

Government
  - Body: Thuneri Grama Panchayath

Population (2011)
  - Total: 23,421

Languages
  - Official: Malayalam, English
- Time zone: UTC+5:30 (IST)
- PIN: 673505
- Vehicle registration: KL-18
- Nearest city: Nadapuram
- Vidhan Sabha constituency: Nadapuram

Thuneri is a village in Kozhikode district in the state of Kerala, India.

== Demographics ==
As of 2011 Indian census, Thuneri had a population of 23421 with 10693 males and 12728 females.

== Political violence ==
A 19 year old Democratic Youth Federation of India worker, C. K. Shibin, was hacked to death in Thunerin on 22 January 2015, Thuneri, allegedly by Indian Union Muslim League workers.

Following the murder, Thuneri had riots and looting with more than 50 Muslim houses attacked and properties worth crores of rupees destroyed. Later the court released the accused killers due to lack of evidence.
