= 2015 Kolazhy Gram Panchayat election =

2015 Election

2015 Kolazhy Grama Panchayat Election
← 2010	5 November 2015	2020 →

All 17 wards in the Panchayat 9 seats needed for a majority
Alliance	UDF	LDF	NDA
Last election	10	7	0
Seats won	10	7	0
Seat change	Steady	Steady	Steady
Popular vote	8608	8973	2060
Percentage	42.87%	44.68%	10.26%
Elected Panchayat President
NA

Vote Share by Alliance
1. LDF (44.68%)
2. UDF (42.87%)
3. NDA (10.26%)
4. Other (2.19%)

Election to Kolazhy Grama Panchayat was held on 5 November 2015 as part of Local Body Elections, Kerala.Counting was held on 7 November 2015. UDF secured majority by winning 10 out of 17 seats in the panchayath.

== Results (summary) ==
=== By alliance ===
Total Seats	UDF	LDF	NDA	IND
17	10	7	0	0

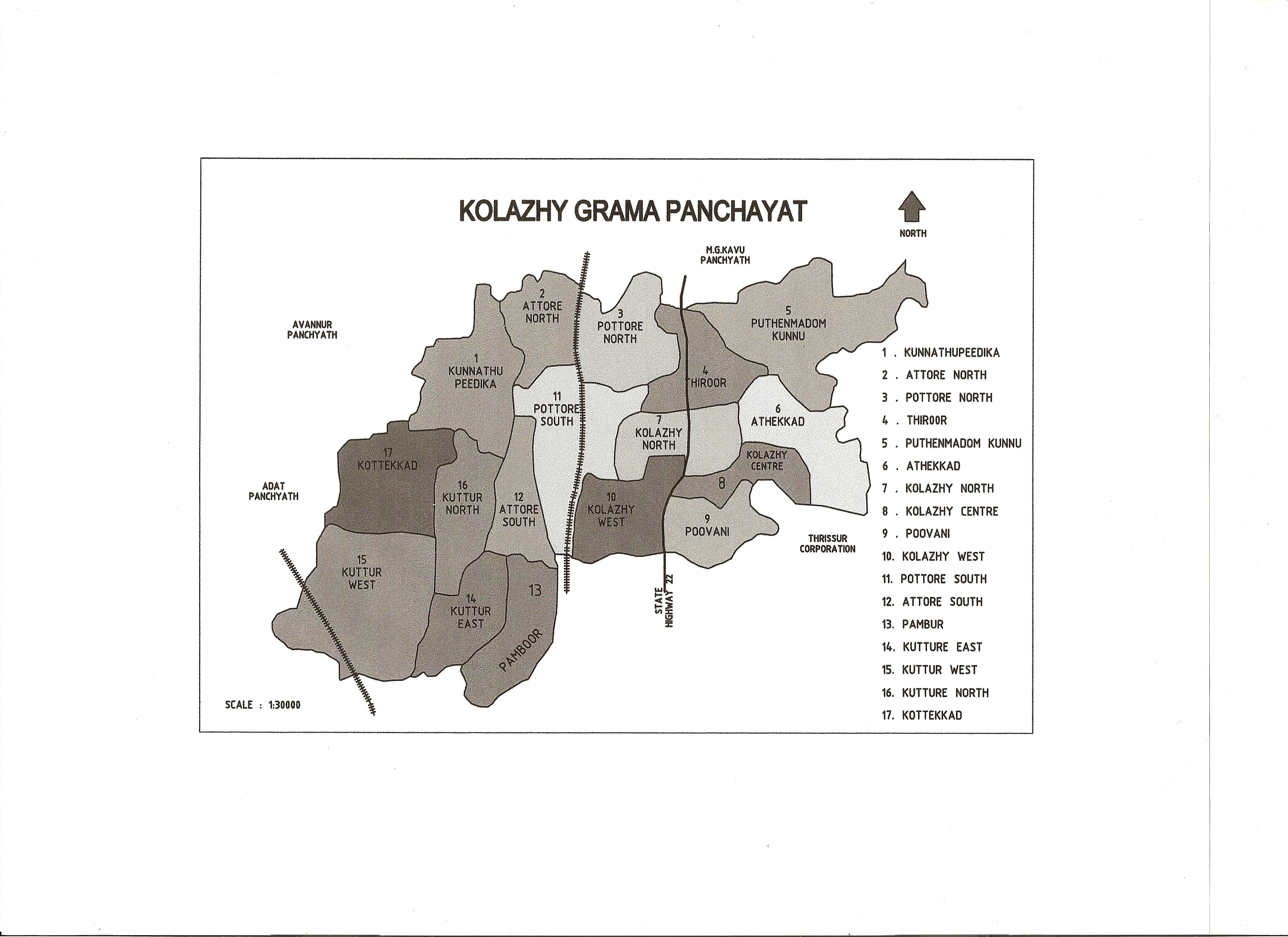
Kolazhy Grama Panchayat Wards

=== Winning candidates ===
Ward Number	Ward Name	Winner	Majority	Party	Front
1	Kunnathupeetika	SUMITHA SHAJI	29	INC	UDF
2	Attore North	A J SHAJU	23	INC	UDF
3	Pottore North	K S AJITH	502	CPM	LDF
4	Thiroor	ESSY BIJU	32	INC	UDF
5	Puthan Madham Kunnu	I B SANTHOSH	19	CPM	LDF
6	Athekkad	JESSY WILSON	116	INC	UDF
7	Kolazhy North	K J CHANDI	110	INC	UDF
8	Kolazhy Centre	SUNITHA VIJAYABHARAT	190	CPM	LDF
9	Poovani	LAKSHMI VISWAMBHARAN	474	CPM	LDF
10	Kolazhy West	M T SEBASTIAN	416	CPM	LDF
11	Pottore South	BINISH.K.M	123	CPI	LDF
12	Attore South	BENCY SHAJI	31	INC	UDF
13	Pambur	O.M.SHAJU	300	INC	UDF
14	Kuttoor East	ALICE TEACHER	23	IND	LDF
15	Kuttoor West	P.G.UNNIKRISHNAN	40	INC	UDF
16	Kuttoor North	ANNIE RAPHEL	460	INC	UDF
17	Kottekkad	JESSY LONAPPAN	262	INC	UDF

== Results (detailed) ==
=== Ward 1 (Kunnathupeetika) ===
Position	Candidate	Party	Front	Vote	Majority
1	SUMITHA SHAJI	INC	UDF	564	29
2	SIJI ANOOP	CPM	LDF	535	
3	RAJITHA SATHYAN	BJP	NDA	114	

=== Ward 2 (Attore North) ===
Position	Candidate	Party	Front	Vote	Majority
1	A J SHAJU	INC	UDF	556	23
2	M N RAJEEV	CPM	LDF	533	
3	SUBIN C.S	BJP	NDA	69	

=== Ward 3 (Pottore North) ===
Position	Candidate	Party	Front	Vote	Majority
1	K S AJITH	CPM	LDF	723	502
2	T R SATHEESAN	BJP	NDA	221	
3	VIJAYAN KUNNANATH	INC	UDF	200	
4	T A CHANDRAN	IND	IND	114	

=== Ward 4 (Thiroor) ===
Position	Candidate	Party	Front	Vote	Majority
1	ESSY BIJU	INC	UDF	609	32
2	BINCY JOHNSON	IND	LDF	577	
3	SISILY CHIRAYATH	IND	IND	82	

=== Ward 5 (Puthan Madham Kunnu) ===
Position	Candidate	Party	Front	Vote	Majority
1	I B SANTHOSH	CPM	LDF	674	19
2	N A SABU	INC	UDF	655	
3	V S SUBRAMANYAN	BJP	NDA	113	
4	THOMAS	IND	IND	20	
5	STEEPHAN M L	IND	IND	16	

=== Ward 6 (Athekkad) ===
Position	Candidate	Party	Front	Vote	Majority
1	JESSY WILSON	INC	UDF	604	116
2	RAJI AJAYAN	CPM	LDF	488	
3	SINDHU BALAN	BJP	NDA	81	

=== Ward 7 (Kolazhy North) ===
Position	Candidate	Party	Front	Vote	Majority
1	K J CHANDI	INC	UDF	476	110
2	CHANDRASENAN MATTATHOLI	IND	LDF	366	
3	DIBIN DAS	BJP	NDA	169	
4	MALAPPURATH RAVI	IND	IND	75	

=== Ward 8 (Kolazhy Centre) ===
Position	Candidate	Party	Front	Vote	Majority
1	SUNITHA VIJAYABHARAT	CPM	LDF	422	190
2	SUBHASHINI RAVEENDRAN	INC	UDF	232	
3	GEETHU MANIKANDAN	BJP	NDA	90	

=== Ward 9 (Poovani) ===
Position	Candidate	Party	Front	Vote	Majority
1	LAKSHMI VISWAMBHARAN	CPM	LDF	679	474
2	SHEELA PRASAD	INC	UDF	205	
3	INVALID VOTES			1	

=== Ward 10 (Kolazhy West) ===
Position	Candidate	Party	Front	Vote	Majority
1	M T SEBASTIAN	CPM	LDF	659	416
2	K KRISHNANKUTTY	INC	UDF	243	

=== Ward 11 (Pottore South) ===
Position	Candidate	Party	Front	Vote	Majority
1	BINISH.K.M	CPI	LDF	610	123
2	V.A.RAMAKRISHNAN	INC	UDF	487	
3	K.T. RATHISH	BJP	NDA	262	

=== Ward 12 (Attore South) ===
Position	Candidate	Party	Front	Vote	Majority
1	BENCY SHAJI	INC	UDF	598	31
2	REMYA KANNADASAN	CPM	LDF	567	
3	ALLI	BJP	NDA	137	

=== Ward 13 (Pambur) ===
Position	Candidate	Party	Front	Vote	Majority
1	O.M.SHAJU	INC	UDF	677	300
2	DAVID KANNANAIKAL	IND	LDF	377	
3	SANTHOSH BABU	BJP	NDA	134	
4	N.M.SHAJU	IND	IND	17	

=== Ward 14 (Kuttoor East) ===
Position	Candidate	Party	Front	Vote	Majority
1	ALICE TEACHER	IND	LDF	540	23
2	NESSY VARGHESE	INC	UDF	517	
3	REMYA. M	BJP	NDA	404	

=== Ward 15 (Kuttoor West) ===
Position	Candidate	Party	Front	Vote	Majority
1	P.G.UNNIKRISHNAN	INC	UDF	537	40
2	K.RAMACHANDRAN	CPM	LDF	497	
3	MANOJ.C	BJP	NDA	220	

=== Ward 16 (Kuttoor North) ===
Position	Candidate	Party	Front	Vote	Majority
1	ANNIE RAPHEL	INC	UDF	810	460
2	NISHA BABU	IND	LDF	350	

=== Ward 17 (Kottekkad) ===
Position	Candidate	Party	Front	Vote	Majority
1	JESSY LONAPPAN	INC	UDF	638	262
2	SEEMA SHABU	IND	LDF	376	
3	THANKAMANY KUMARAN	IND	IND	116	
4	SUPRIYA	BJP	NDA	46	
