= 2020 Kolazhy Gram Panchayat election =

2020 Kolazhy Grama Panchayat Election
← 2015	10 December 2020	2025 →

All 17 wards in the Panchayat 9 seats needed for a majority
Alliance	LDF	UDF	NDA
Last election	7	10	0
Seats won	12	5	0
Seat change	5▲	5▼	Steady
Popular vote	9136	8116	2808
Percentage	43.49%	38.64%	13.37%
Elected Panchayat President
Lakshmi Viswambharan

Vote Share by Alliance
1. LDF (43.49%)
2. UDF (38.64%)
3. NDA (13.37%)
4. Other (4.50%)

Election to Kolazhy Grama Panchayat was held on 10 December 2020 as part of Local Body Elections, Kerala.Counting was held on 16 December 2020. LDF secured majority by winning 12 out of 17 seats in the panchayath.

== Results(Summary) ==
=== By Alliance ===
Total Seats	LDF	UDF	NDA	IND
17	12	5	0	0

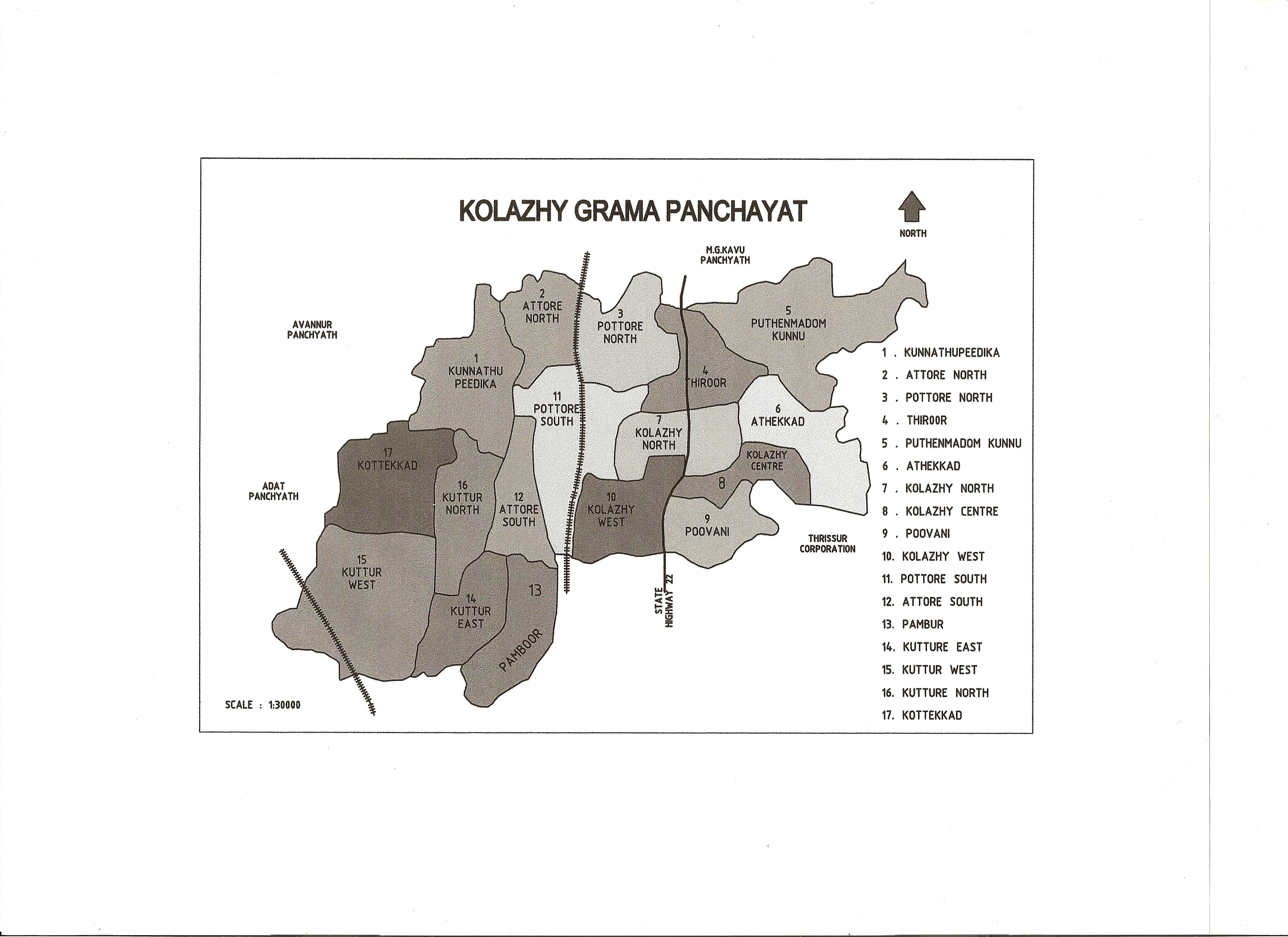
Kolazhy Grama Panchayat Wards

=== Winning Candidates ===
Ward Number	Ward Name	Winner	Majority	Party	Front
1	Kunnathupeetika	M D Vikas Raj	98	CPM	LDF
2	Attore North	Usha Raveendran	311	CPM	LDF
3	Pottore North	Beena Radhakrishnan	353	CPM	LDF
4	Thiroor	T K Krishnankutty	179	INC	UDF
5	Puthan Madham Kunnu	Indira Sasikumar	257	INC	UDF
6	Athekkad	Sruthi Saji	55	CPM	LDF
7	Kolazhy North	Abhirami Suresh	87	IND	LDF
8	Kolazhy	K T Sreejith	169	CPM	LDF
9	Poovani	Lakshmi Viswambharan	273	CPM	LDF
10	Kolazhy West	Sunitha Vijayabharath	341	CPM	LDF
11	Pottore South	Nijamol Jayakumar	45	CPI	LDF
12	Attore South	Peethambaran I S	120	CPM	LDF
13	Pambur	Rathi Ravi	176	INC	UDF
14	Kuttoor East	Prakash Chittilappilly	199	IND	LDF
15	Kuttoor West	Nisha Sajeevan	9	CPM	LDF
16	Kuttoor North	Martin Kottekkad	128	INC	UDF
17	Kottekkad	P A Lonappan	304	INC	UDF

== Results(Detailed) ==
=== Ward 1 ( Kunnathupeetika ) ===
Position	Candidate	Party	Front	Vote	Majority
1	M D Vikas Raj	CPM	LDF	578	98
2	M J Shaju	INC	UDF	480	
3	Eljo Chakkalakkal	IND	IND	108	
4	Vasu Naduvath	BJP	NDA	100	

=== Ward 2 ( Attore North ) ===
Position	Candidate	Party	Front	Vote	Majority
1	Usha Raveendran	CPM	LDF	681	311
2	Sindhu Jayaraj	INC	UDF	370	
3	Valsa Vasu	BJP	NDA	124	

=== Ward 3 ( Pottore North ) ===
Position	Candidate	Party	Front	Vote	Majority
1	Beena Radhakrishnan	CPM	LDF	691	353
2	Sanitha Santhosh	INC	UDF	338	
3	Vidhubala	BJP	NDA	263	

=== Ward 4 ( Thiroor ) ===
Position	Candidate	Party	Front	Vote	Majority
1	T K Krishnankutty	INC	UDF	707	179
2	P M Anoop	CPI	LDF	528	
3	K S Ajith	BJP	NDA	109	

=== Ward 5 (Puthan Madham Kunnu) ===
Position	Candidate	Party	Front	Vote	Majority
1	Indira Sasikumar	INC	UDF	829	257
2	Rosy Thomas	IND	LDF	572	
3	Sajana Roopesh	BJP	NDA	155	

=== Ward 6 (Athekkad) ===
Position	Candidate	Party	Front	Vote	Majority
1	Sruthi Saji	CPM	LDF	512	55
2	Jessy Wilson	INC	UDF	457	
3	Anitha	BJP	NDA	185	
4	Shajitha T S	IND		98	

=== Ward 7 (Kolazhy North) ===
Position	Candidate	Party	Front	Vote	Majority
1	Abhirami Suresh	IND	LDF	495	87
2	M N Vijayalakshmi	INC	UDF	408	
3	Ramyamol Ramesh	BJP	NDA	181	

=== Ward 8 (Kolazhy) ===
Position	Candidate	Party	Front	Vote	Majority
1	K T Sreejith	CPM	LDF	403	169
2	Bharathan Madhathiparampil	INC	UDF	234	
3	Gopalakrishnan	BJP	NDA	109	

=== Ward 9 (Poovani) ===
Position	Candidate	Party	Front	Vote	Majority
1	Lakshmi Viswambharan	CPM	LDF	496	273
2	Raveendran Poluvalappil	INC	UDF	223	
3	Balakrishnan Kantampulli	BJP	NDA	216	
4	Rajeev Kumar Puthiyedath	IND		19	

=== Ward 10 (Kolazhy West) ===
Position	Candidate	Party	Front	Vote	Majority
1	Sunitha Vijayabharath	CPM	LDF	583	341
2	M R Shantha	INC	UDF	242	
3	Vijitha	BJP	NDA	106	

=== Ward 11 (Pottore South) ===
Position	Candidate	Party	Front	Vote	Majority
1	Nijamol Jayakumar	CPI	LDF	408	45
2	Prasannakumari	IND	IND	363	
3	Swapna Vinod	BJP	NDA	312	
4	Sujatha Vijayan	INC	UDF	292	

=== Ward 12 (Attore South) ===
Position	Candidate	Party	Front	Vote	Majority
1	Peethambaran I S	CPM	LDF	701	120
2	Jomon Kollannur	INC	UDF	581	
3	Prakashan	BJP	NDA	92	

=== Ward 13 (Pambur) ===
Position	Candidate	Party	Front	Vote	Majority
1	Rathi Ravi	INC	UDF	649	176
2	Athira Babu	IND	LDF	473	
3	Pushya	BJP	NDA	91	

=== Ward 14 (Kuttoor East) ===
Position	Candidate	Party	Front	Vote	Majority
1	Prakash Chittilappilly	IND	LDF	837	199
2	Anto C M	INC	UDF	638	
3	Sasi Kallatt	BJP	NDA	117	

=== Ward 15 (Kuttoor West) ===
Position	Candidate	Party	Front	Vote	Majority
1	Nisha Sajeevan	CPM	LDF	507	9
2	Indu Nandakumar	INC	UDF	498	
3	Sreedevi	BJP	NDA	402	

=== Ward 16 (Kuttoor North) ===
Position	Candidate	Party	Front	Vote	Majority
1	Martin Kottekkad	INC	UDF	485	128
2	Leo Varghese	IND		357	
3	Prashanth Chittilappilly	IND	LDF	290	
4	Vinod Kumar	BJP	NDA	62	

=== Ward 17 (Kottekkad) ===
Position	Candidate	Party	Front	Vote	Majority
1	P A Lonappan	INC	UDF	685	304
2	Kumaran K C	IND	LDF	381	
3	B D Robert	BJP	NDA	184	
