= 1977 Indian general election in Kerala =

1977 Indian general election
- March 1977

20 seats
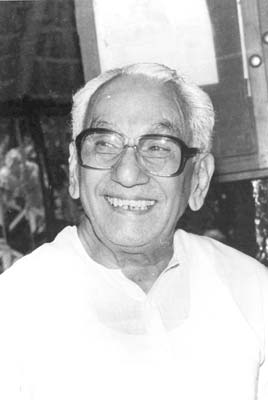

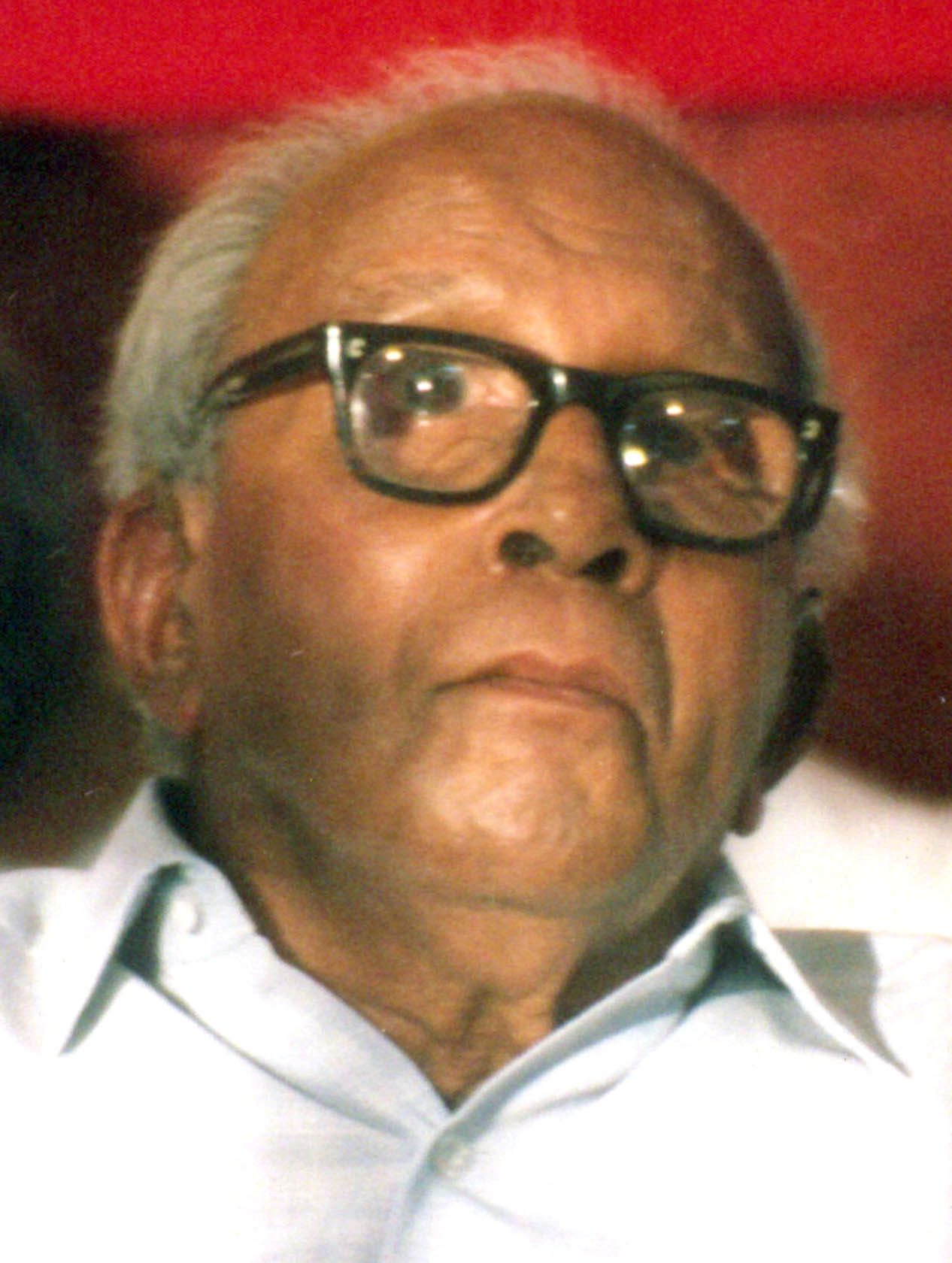
	First party	Second party
Leader	K. Karunakaran	E. M. S. Namboodiripad
Party	INC	CPI(M)
Alliance	UDF	LDF
Leader's seat	-	-
Last election	18	2
Seats won	20	0
Seat change	▲2	▼2
Percentage	54.2%	43.2%
Prime Minister before election
Indira Gandhi
INC
Prime Minister after election
Morarji Desai
JP

The 1977 Parliamentary Election was held in the aftermath of the Emergency which was declared nationwide. At the national level, the Indian National Congress lost power for the first time in independent India, with Prime Minister Indira Gandhi losing from her own constituency and the Janata Party under Morarji Desai coming to power.

However, the trend was the reverse in Kerala with the INC-led United Front winning a landslide by registering victories in all 20 constituencies. It is the only election in Kerala where a coalition has whitewashed all the seats. In the concurrently held assembly election, the United Front won a colossal 111 out of 140 seats, the only state to elect a Congress-led government in that year. This seemingly unusual result was attributed to the good governance as well as performance of the outgoing Achutha Menon Ministry. Congress leaders K. Karunakaran and A.K. Antony would go on to assume the office of Chief Minister for the first time.

For the Communist Party of India (Marxist), this election remains its worst performance in a Lok Sabha election in Kerala. It also came at a time when the party came into power in West Bengal, marking the beginning of a 3 and a half decade long rule.

The two coalitions comprised the following parties-

United Front- Indian National Congress, Communist Party of India, Indian Union Muslim League, Revolutionary Socialist Party, Kerala Congress

Marxist Front- Communist Party of India (Marxist), Bharatiya Lok Dal, Kerala Congress (Pillai), Muslim League (Opposition)

== Parties and alliances ==
=== United Front ===
No.	Party	Election Symbol	Seats contested
1.	Indian National Congress		11
2.	Communist Party of India	Star	4
3.	Indian Union Muslim League		2
4.	Kerala Congress		2
5.	Revolutionary Socialist Party		1

=== Marxist Front ===
No.	Party	Election Symbol	Seats contested
1.	Communist Party of India (Marxist)	Key	9
2.	Bharatiya Lok Dal		3
3.	Kerala Congress (Pillai)		3
4.	Muslim League (Opposition)		2
5.	Independent		3

== List of Candidates ==
Constituency					
Constituency		United Front		Marxist Front	
1	Kasaragod	INC	K. Ramachandran	CPI(M)	Ramanna Rai
2	Cannanore	CPI	C. K. Chandrappan	CPI(M)	O. Bharathan
3	Badagara	INC	K. P. Unnikrishnan	BLD	Arangil Sreedharan
4	Calicut	INC	V. A. Seyid Muhammad	BLD	M. Kamalam
5	Manjeri	IUML	Ebrahim Sulaiman Sait	AIML	B. M. Hussain
6	Ponnani	IUML	G. M. Banatwala	AIML	M. Moideen Kutty Haji
7	Palghat	INC	A. Sunnasahib	CPI(M)	T. Sivadasa Menon
8	Ottapalam (SC)	INC	K. Kunhambu	CPI(M)	C. K. Chakrapani
9	Trichur	CPI	K. A. Rajan	CPI(M)	Aravindakshan
10	Mukundapuram	INC	A. C. George	Ind.	S. C. S. Menon
11	Ernakulam	INC	Henry Austin	CPI(M)	K. N. Raveendranath
12	Muvattupuzha	KEC	George J. Mathew	KC(P)	K. M. Joseph Kuruppamadham
13	Kottayam	KEC	Skariah Thomas	KC(P)	Varkey George
14	Idukki	INC	C. M. Stephen	KC(P)	M. M. Joseph
15	Alleppey	INC	V. M. Sudheeran	CPI(M)	E. Balanandan
16	Mavelikara	INC	B. K. Nair	Ind.	B. G. Verghese
17	Adoor (SC)	CPI	P. K. Kodiyan	CPI(M)	K. Chandrasekharan Shastri
18	Quilon	RSP	N. Sreekantan Nair	Ind.	N. Rajagopalan
19	Chirayinkil	INC	Vayalar Ravi	CPI(M)	K. Anirudhan
20	Trivandrum	CPI	M. N. Govindan Nair	BLD	P. Viswambharan

== Results ==
=== Results by Party/Alliance ===
Alliance/ Party		Popular vote			Seats		
Alliance/ Party		Votes	%	±pp	Contested	Won	+/−
UF	INC	25,79,745	29.13		11	11	
UF	CPI	9,19,359	10.38		4	4	
UF	IUML	5,33,726	6.03		2	2	
UF	KEC	4,91,674	5.55		2	2	
UF	RSP	2,72,378	3.08		1	1	
UF	Total	47,96,882	54.17	Steady	20	20	Steady
MF	CPI(M)	18,00,193	20.33		9	0	
MF	BLD	6,37,206	7.20		3	0	
MF	KC(P)	5,26,937	5.95		3	0	
MF	MLO	3,18,979	3.60		2	0	
MF	IND	5,61,709	6.34		3	0	
MF	Total	38,45,024	43.42	Steady	20	0	Steady
Others		8,305	0.09	Steady	1	0	Steady
IND		2,05,962	2.33		22	0	Steady
Total		88,56,173	100%	-	63	20	-

=== Summary Results ===
Vote Share by alliance
1. UDF (54.2%)
2. LDF (43.2%)
3. Other (2.60%)

No.	Constituency	Elected M.P.	Party	Majority	Alliance
1	Kasaragod	Kadannappalli Ramachandran	INC	5,042	UF
2	Kannur	C.K. Chandrappan	CPI	12,877	UF
3	Vatakara	K. P. Unnikrishnan	INC	8,070	UF
4	Kozhikode	V. A. Seyid Muhammad	INC	13,704	UF
5	Manjeri	Ebrahim Sulaiman Sait	IUML	97,201	UF
6	Ponnani	G. M. Banatwala	IUML	1,17,546	UF
7	Palakkad	A. Sunnasahib	INC	44,820	UF
8	Ottapalam	K. Kunhambu	INC	35,721	UF
9	Thrissur	K. A. Rajan	CPI	37,506	UF
10	Mukundapuram	A. C. George	INC	4,220	UF
11	Ernakulam	Henry Austin	INC	7,285	UF
12	Muvattupuzha	George J. Matthew	KEC	44,820	UF
13	Kottayam	Skaria Thomas	KEC	68,695	UF
14	Idukki	C. M. Stephen	INC	79,257	UF
15	Alappuzha	V. M. Sudheeran	INC	64,016	UF
16	Mavelikkara	B. K. Nair	INC	56,552	UF
17	Adoor	P.K. Kodiyan	CPI	40,567	UF
18	Kollam	N. Sreekantan Nair	RSP	1,13,161	UF
19	Chirayankil	Vayalar Ravi	INC	60,925	UF
20	Thiruvananthapuram	M. N. Govindan Nair	CPI	69,822	UF
