= K. Uppi Saheb =

Indian politician and social worker

Kottal Uppi
- Kottal Uppi

Personal details
- Born: 1891 Kottayam, Kuthuparamba
- Died: 11 May 1973 (aged 81–82)
- Political party: All-India Muslim League (till 1947); Indian Union Muslim League (after 1947)
- Spouse: Kayyumma
- Parent: Mayan Adhikari (father)
- Education: Tellicherry Moplah School; Tellicherry Brennen College; Mohammedans College, Madras

K. Uppi Saheb, or Kottal Uppi Saheb Bahadur, (1891–1972) was an Indian politician and social worker from Kannur, north Kerala.

Kottal Uppi, from an elite Mappila family from north Malabar with a mercantile background, was educated at Tellicherry Brennen College and Mohammedans College, Madras. He was elected to the Madras Legislative Council from a Muslim seat in 1923. He was re-elected to the legislative council in 1926 (as a Congress member supported by the Swaraj Party). He is said to have maintained "tenuous and cautious" links with the Khilafat Movement at this time. He was later elected to the Imperial Legislative Assembly from West Coast and Nilgiris, Muhammadan (1930).

Along with K. M. Seethi Saheb, B. Pocker and M. Mohammed Ismail, Uppi Saheb was one of the principal leaders of All-India Muslim League in Madras Presidency from the mid-1930s. After the partition of India in 1947, the All-India Muslim League was succeeded by Indian Union Muslim League (1951) in the new Dominion of India.

He served as the Assembly Leader of the Muslim League (ML) in Madras Legislative Assembly. He later ceased to be a Member of the Assembly on the re-organization of States.
