= E. Ahamed =

Indian politician

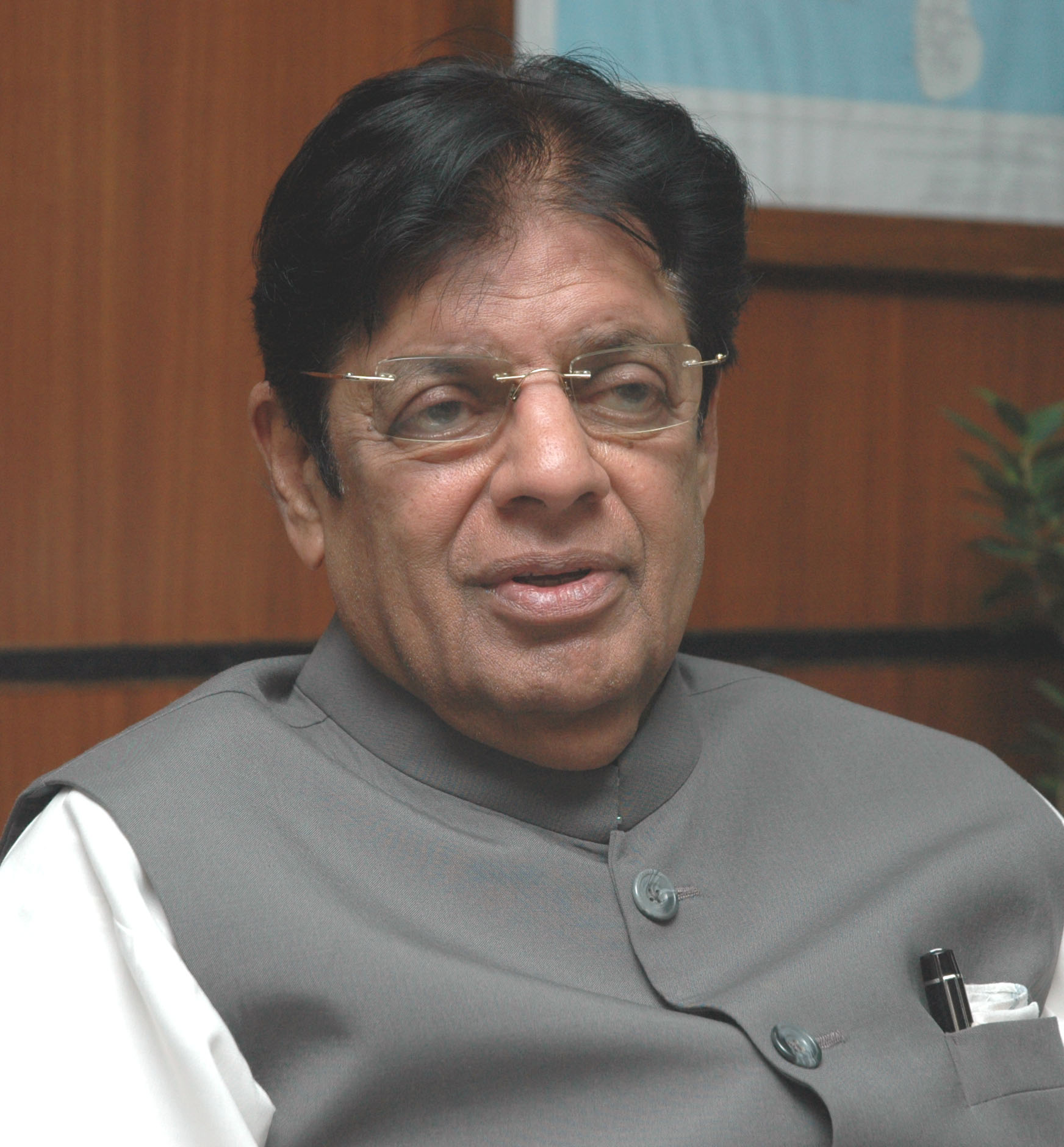
- Ahamed in 2014

Member of Parliament, Lok Sabha
- In office 18 May 2009 – 1 February 2017
- Preceded by: Office established
- Succeeded by: P. K. Kunhalikutty
- Constituency: Malappuram
- In office 16 May 2004 – 18 May 2009
- Preceded by: G. M. Banatwala
- Succeeded by: E. T. Mohammed Basheer
- Constituency: Ponnani
- In office 20 June 1991 – 16 May 2004
- Preceded by: Ebrahim Sulaiman Sait
- Succeeded by: T. K. Hamza
- Constituency: Manjeri

Minister of State for External Affairs
- In office 23 May 2004 – 26 May 2014
- Prime Minister: Manmohan Singh
- Minister: Natwar Singh; Manmohan Singh; Pranab Mukherjee; S. M. Krishna; Salman Khurshid
- Preceded by: Vinod Khanna
- Succeeded by: V. K. Singh

Personal details
- Born: 29 April 1938 Cannanore, Madras Presidency, British India (now Kerala)
- Died: 1 February 2017 (aged 78) New Delhi
- Party: Indian Union Muslim League
- Spouse: Zuhara Ahamed
- Children: 2 sons and 1 daughter
- Education: Brennen College, Tellicherry

E. Ahamed (29 April 1938 – 1 February 2017), Edappakath Ahamed in full, was an Indian politician from Kannur (then Cannanore) in northern Kerala. A Member of Parliament (Lok Sabha) between 1991 and 2017, he was key figure in India's diplomatic relations with the Middle East.

Educated at Brennen College, Tellicherry and Trivandrum Law College, Ahamed was first elected to Kerala Legislative Assembly in 1967 (from Kannur, with Indian Union Muslim League). He later served as a cabinet minister (Industry) in the U D F ministry headed by Congress-leader K. Karunakaran (1982–87). He was first elected to the Parliament (Lok Sabha) in 1991. Ahamed was appointed Union Minister of State, Ministry of External Affairs, in 2004 (Congress-led U P A ministry headed by Manmohan Singh). He also served as Union Minister of State for Railways and Human Resource Development.

Ahamed served as the National President, Indian Union Muslim League between 2008 and 2017. He was the first Indian Union Muslim League union minister in independent India. In 2004, he was famously dispatched by Atal Bihari Vajpayee to the United Nations (Geneva) to represent India.

== Early life ==
E. Ahamed was born on 29 April 1938 in a merchant family in Kannur, Malabar District (Now Kannur district, Kerala), to Edappakath Nafeesa Beevi and Ovintakath Abdul Khader. He carried his mother's 'house name' as his initials as the tradition among the Cannanore Mappilas.

He graduated from Government Brennen College, Tellicherry and later obtained a law degree from Government Law College, Thiruvananthapuram. He was the first General Secretary of the MSF, the students' wing of Indian Union Muslim League. He also worked as a reporter for the Chandrika newspaper. Ahamed married Zuhara in 1961 who died in an accident in 1999. The couple has three children.

== Political career ==
=== In Kerala ===
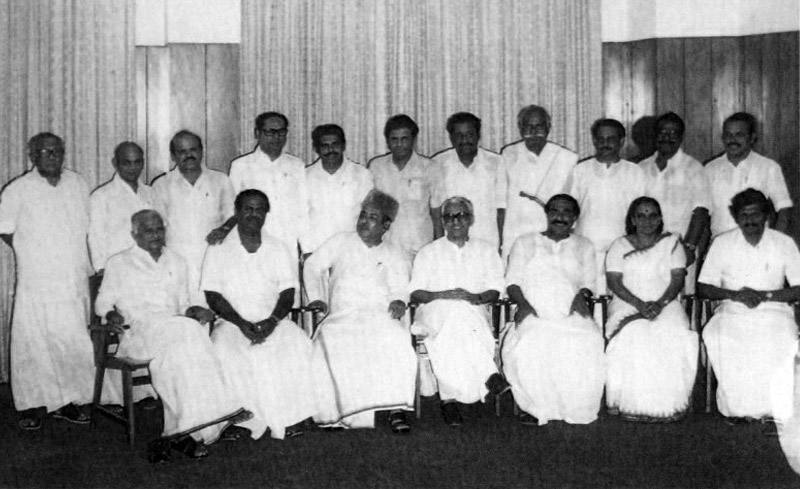
Kerala Council of Ministers, 1982 - 87 (1983)

Mandate	Legislative Assembly	Constituency	Party
1967	3rd Assembly	Cannanore	Indian Union Muslim League
1977	5th Assembly	Koduvally	Indian Union Muslim League
1980	6th Assembly	Tanur	Indian Union Muslim League
1982	7th Assembly	Tanur	Indian Union Muslim League
1987	8th Assembly	Tanur	Indian Union Muslim League

- Ahamed served as Minister for Industry from May 1982 to March 1987 (U D F ministry headed by Congress-leader K. Karunakaran).
- He was a member of the Kerala and Calicut University Senate. He was also Chairman, Kannur Municipal Council (1981–83).
- He also served as the founder Chairman, Kerala State Rural Development Board (1971–77), and Chairman, Kerala Small Industries Development Corporation.
- Ahamed was chosen as the General Secretary, Indian Union Muslim League in 1995.

=== Career in national politics ===
Mandate	Constituency	Party
1991	Manjeri	Indian Union Muslim League
1996	Manjeri	Indian Union Muslim League
1998	Manjeri	Indian Union Muslim League
1999	Manjeri	Indian Union Muslim League
2004	Ponnani	Indian Union Muslim League
2009	Malappuram	Indian Union Muslim League
2014	Malappuram	Indian Union Muslim League

- From 2004 to 2009, Ahamed served as the Minister of State for External Affairs. From 2009 to 2011, he was the Minister of State for Railways. He assumed charge again as Minister of State for External Affairs in early 2011. Ahamed also held the additional charge of the Union Minister of State, Human Resource Development 2011 to 2012.

=== Other positions ===
President

- Muslim Educational Foundation, Panur, Kannur
- Kannur Deenul Islam Sabha, Kerala

Member

- Board of the Medical College, Pariyaram, Kerala
- Managing Committee, MEA Engineering College, Malappuram
- Executive Council, Aligarh Muslim University
- Central Haj Committee

== Representing India ==
- Ahamed represented India in the United Nations several times between 1991 and 2014.
- Special Emissary, Prime Minister Indira Gandhi to the Gulf (1984).
- Chairman, Crisis Management Group (Iraq hostage crisis, August–September 2004).

== Minister in different ministries ==
Government of Kerala
Period	Portfolio	Chief Minister
1982 – 1987	Cabinet Minister: Industries	K. Karunakaran
Union Government (Govt. of India)
Period	Portfolios	Prime Minister
2004 – 2014	Minister of State (MoS) (Junior Minister): External Affairs (2004–09 and 2011–14); Railways (2009 - 2011); Human Resource Development (2011 - 2012)	Manmohan Singh

== Death ==
Ahamed died on 1 February 2017 after suffering a cardiac arrest in a joint session of Parliament. He was buried with full state honours at the Kannur City Juma Masjid.

Lok Sabha
Preceded by Ebrahim Sulaiman Sait	Member of Parliament for Manjeri; 1991 – 2004	Succeeded by T. K. Hamza
Preceded by G. M. Banatwala	Member of Parliament for Ponnani; 2004 – 2009	Succeeded by E. T. Mohammed Basheer
Preceded by Constituency established	Member of Parliament for Malappuram; 2009 – 2017	Succeeded by P. K. Kunhalikutty
Party political offices
Preceded by G. M. Banatwala	Leader; Indian Union Muslim League; Lok Sabha; 2004 – 2017	Succeeded by E. T. Mohammed Basheer
