= Laila Al-Marayati =

Palestinian American doctor

Laila Al-Marayati (Arabic: ليلى المراياتي; born 1962) is a Palestinian-American doctor and a Muslim activist, and former presidential appointee to the US Commission on International Religious Freedom, where she served for two years after being appointed by President Bill Clinton.

Al-Marayati was born in 1962 and was raised in Los Angeles. Her father, the late Dr. Sabri El Farra, was originally from the Gaza Strip and her mother is from Missouri.

She earned her medical degree from University of California, Irvine School of Medicine, and received specialty training in Obstetrics and Gynecology at Los Angeles County USC Women's Hospital. After, she opened her own practice focusing on gynecology, which she ran for 11 years. She is currently an Assistant Professor of Clinical Obstetrics and Gynecology at the University of Southern California, Keck School of Medicine. She also serves as the Director of Women's Health at the Eisner Pediatric and Family Medical Center in downtown Los Angeles.

In the 1990s, Al-Marayati served as a member of the US State Department's Advisory Committee on Religious Freedom Abroad, and in 1995 she was appointed by Hillary Rodham-Clinton to be a member of the official United States' delegation to the United Nations Fourth World Conference on Women in Beijing, China.

From 1999 to 2001, she served as a presidential appointee to the US Commission on International Religious Freedom (USCIRF).

In addition, she has been the spokesperson for the Muslim Women's League, based in Los Angeles since 1994. The MWL's main work has been to educate Muslims and non-Muslims alike about the rights of women in Islam. She is the author of numerous articles and position papers on a range of issues that include topics such as sexuality in Islam and violence against women. Al-Marayati led a fact-finding delegation to Croatia during the Balkan War to help spread awareness about rape survivors from Bosnia. She continues to be an outspoken critic against female genital cutting (also known as female circumcision or female genital mutilation) and other practices that are harmful to women.

As of 2006, Al-Marayati was involved with the Muslim Public Affairs Council, and in this role she talks about the perception of Muslims in the media.

As of 2025 she is the chairperson of KinderUSA, and in this role she has traveled to Gaza to determine medical and food needs for Gazans living in the area.

== Personal life ==
She is married to Salam al-Marayati, the president of the Muslim Public Affairs Council.
