= Nalakath Soopy =

Indian politician (born 1946)

Minister for Education, Government of Kerala
- In office 25 May 2001 – 29 August 2004
- Chief Minister: A. K. Antony
- Preceded by: P. J. Joseph
- Succeeded by: E. T. Mohammed Basheer
- Constituency: Perinthalmanna

Member of Kerala Legislative Assembly
- In office 1970–2006
- Succeeded by: V. Sasikumar
- Constituency: Perinthalmanna

President of Thazhekode Gram Panchayat
- In office 1979-1991

Personal details
- Born: August 15, 1946 (age 80) Thazhekode, Malappuram Dt., Kerala
- Party: Indian Union Muslim League
- Other political affiliations: UDF
- Relations: Married
- Children: 1 son and 1 daughter
- Profession: Politician, lawyer

Nalakath Soopy (born 15 August 1946) is a prominent leader of Indian Union Muslim League (IUML) and former Minister of Kerala.

== Biography ==
Nalakath Soopy is an LLB degree holder and came to active politics through the Muslim Students Federation. Soopy held high position in the party. He was elected to the Kerala Legislative Assembly for the Perinthalmanna Constituency in 1980 for the first time, and reelected to the Assembly in all General Elections until 2001. He served as the Minister for Education from 2001 to 2004 in the A.K. Antony Ministry.
