= B. Pocker =

Indian politician and lawyer

- B. Pocker

Member of Parliament, Lok Sabha
- Preceded by: Inaugural Holder
- Succeeded by: M. Muhammad Ismail
- Constituency: Malappuram
- In office 1952–1957
- In office 1957–1962

Personal details
- Born: 1890 Tellicherry, Malabar District, Madras Presidency
- Died: 29 July 1965 (aged 74–75) Kozhikode
- Party: Muslim League (till 1947); Indian Union Muslim League (after 1948)
- Parents: Chalakkandy Peedikayil Kuttivatha Sahib (father); Badekkandy Mariyumma (mother)

B. Pocker (1890 – 29 July 1965), Badekkandy Pocker, also spelled Poker, title Sahib Bahadur, as an Indian politician and lawyer from Tellicherry, north Kerala, Madras Presidency. He served as a member of the Constituent Assembly of India and as the Member of Parliament from Malappuram Parliamentary Constituency between 1952 and 1962.

Pocker was the first Member of Parliament (1952) from Indian Union Muslim League in independent India.

== Career ==
Pocker was born to Chalakkandy Peedikayil Kuttivatha Sahib and Badekkandy Mariyumma in 1890 at Tellicherry in Malabar District, Madras Presidency. He carried his mother's 'house name' as his initials as the tradition among the Cannanore Mappilas.

=== Early career ===
Pocker studied at Tellicherry Brennen College and Madras Christian College. He graduated from Madras Law College in 1915 and started practising as an advocate in Madras High Court in 1917. He was one of earliest university graduates from the Mappila Muslims of Malabar District.

Pocker, by then a senior advocate in the High Court, entered politics in the late 1910s by arguing for special Muslim constituencies in Malabar District. He famously submitted a memorandum during the introduction of the Montagu-Chelmsford reforms (passed as Government of India Act, 1919).

Pocker was a leader of the Caliphate Movement in Malabar District (he supported Shaukat Ali at Madras by representing the Malabar District). He later led the relief activities for Mappilas, who were affected by the Mappila Uprising (1921–22). He formed the "Mappila Amelioration Committee" at Madras, which collected and distributed more than Rs. 200,000 among the Mappilas.

Pocker founded the "South India Muslim Education Society" and "Kerala Muslim Education Association". He served as the Parliament Party Secretary of the United Nationalist Party in the Madras Assembly from 1930 to 1936.

=== With the Muslim League ===
B. Pocker was one of earliest leaders of the Muslim League in Madras Presidency (along with Mohammed Ismail Sahib, K. M. Seethi Saheb and K. Uppi Saheb). He contested from the Kurumbranad-Kozhikkode Constituency (Muslim League). Though he lost the election to the candidate supported by Bafaqy Thangal, the election campaign led by K. M. Seethi Sahib strengthened the Muslim League in Malabar. Eventually, Bafaqy Thangal also joined the party, which spread the acceptance of Muslim League among Mappilas.

=== In the Constituent Assembly ===
Pocker was elected from the Madras Assembly to the Constituent Assembly of India in 1946 (Malabar - Urban Muslim).

Following the partition of India (1947), the All-India Muslim League was virtually disbanded. It was succeeded by the Indian Union Muslim League in the Dominion of India. Even after partition, Pocker and his south Indian League colleagues remained with the League. Within a month, the Constituent Assembly voted to abolish separate electorates for Muslims. Pocker and K. T. M. Ahmed Ibrahim moved an amendment to retain the separate electorates. This motion was defeated in the Constituent Assembly.

== In independent India ==
=== As a Member of Parliament ===
Pocker was elected from Malappuram Parliamentary Constituency to the Lower House (Lok Sabha) in 1952 with the Muslim League. He was re-elected in 1957 as independent (Muslim League) candidate from Manjeri Constituency.

His efforts helped to win Indian Muslims exemptions from the Special Marriage Act, 1954. He also served as National Executive Member, Indian Union Muslim League and Vice President, Muslim League Kerala State Committee.

	Candidate	Votes%	Party
1952 General Elections (Malappuram)	B. Pocker	39.0	Muslim League
1952 General Elections (Malappuram)	T. V. Chathukutty Nair	30.6	Indian National Congress
1952 General Elections (Malappuram)	Kumhali Karikedan	30.4	Communist Party of India
1957 General Elections (Manjeri)	B. Pocker	43.5	Independent (Muslim League)
1957 General Elections (Manjeri)	Kunhikoya Palat	34.4	Indian National Congress
1957 General Elections (Manjeri)	Mohamed Koya K. P.	22.1	Communist Party of India
