= Muslim League (Opposition) =

- Leader: Ummer Bafaqy Thangal
- Founded: 1974 (wing within the League); 1975 (formal)
- Dissolved: 1985
- Split from: Indian Union Muslim League
- Merged into: Indian Union Muslim League
- Alliance: Left front (Kerala); Left Democratic Front

Muslim League (Opposition), also rebel Muslim League, renamed as the All India Muslim League in 1980, was an Indian political party formed by the aggrieved leaders of Indian Union Muslim League in Kerala. The party was a member of the Communist Party of India Marxist-led Left front (later Left Democratic Front) in Kerala.

The party was organized by Ummer Bafaqy Thangal, son-in-law of the prominent Indian Union Muslim League leader Bafaqy Thangal (died 1973). All India Muslim League withdrew from the Left Democratic Front and merged with the Indian Union Muslim League in 1985.

== Formation ==
The signs of a dissensions within ranks of the Kerala unit of the Indian Union Muslim League emerged with the deaths of senior League leaders M. Muhammed Ismail (1972) and Abdurrahiman Bafaqy Thangal (1973).

The main reasons of the rift were,

1. A power struggle between League leaders C. H. Mohammed Koya and Ummer Bafaqy Thangal, the son-in-law of Bafaqy Thangal.
2. A generational conflict within the Kerala unit of the Indian Union Muslim League.
3. A dispute over tactics (whether to compromise the alliance with Indian National Congress in Kerala).

Six aggrieved League M. L. A.s refused the party whip in May 1975. They were expelled from the party, and subsequently the 'rebel Muslim League' was formed.

== Election history ==
The Muslim League (Opposition) or 'rebel Muslim League' began to cooperate with the Communist Party of India Marxist-led Left Front from 1977 Kerala Assembly Elections.

=== 1977 Kerala Assembly Elections ===
The Muslim League (Opposition) contested the 1977 Kerala Legislative Assembly elections by fielding 16 candidates across Kerala. The party managed to receive a total of 390,139 votes (4.45% of the polled votes in Kerala). Three of its candidates were elected; P. P. V. Moosa from Edakkad, P. M. Aboobaker from Calicut-II and K. P. Raman from Kunnamangalam (S. C.).

=== 1977 General Elections ===
Muslim League (Opposition) fielded two candidates in the 1977 general election. Both were defeated by Indian Union Muslim League candidates in straight contests; B. M. Hussain in the Manjeri Constituency (167,034 votes, 38.73%) and M. Moideen Kutty Haji (151,945 votes, 36.05%) in Ponnani Constituency. The party secured the 1979 by-election to the Kasaragod Legislative Assembly seat, with B. M. A. Rahiman as the candidate.

=== 1980 Kerala Assembly Elections ===
Muslim League (Opposition) changed its name to the 'All India Muslim League' ahead of the 1980 Kerala assembly election (with the election symbol of the boat).

All India Muslim League fielded eleven candidates in the 1980 Legislative Assembly election, out of whom five were elected; P. P. V. Moosa, P. M. Aboobacker, K. P. Rama, A. V. Abdulurahiman Haji and M. J. Zakaria. In total, the party received 335,223 votes (3.51% of the polled votes in the state). The party became a partner in the Communist Party of India Marxist-led coalition government, with E. K. Nayanar as the Chief Minister (the first Left Democratic Front government).

=== 1980 General Elections ===
All India Muslim League fielded K. Moideen Kutty Haji in Manjeri Constituency in the 1980 general election. He finished second with 196,820 votes (and managed to receive 45.60% of the total polled votes in the constituency).

=== 1982 Kerala Assembly Elections ===
The All India Muslim League fielded twelve candidates in the 1982 Legislative Assembly election, out of whom four were elected. A. V. Abdulurahiman Haji, P. M. Aboobacker and K. P. Raman were re-elected. N. A. Mammoo Haji was elected from Peringalam. All in all, the candidates of the party obtained 310,626 votes (3.25% of the total polled votes in the state).

== Merger with Indian Union Muslim League ==
The alliance between Communist Party of India Marxist and the All India Muslim League was severed in 1985. The party withdrew from the Left Democratic Front and merged with the Indian Union Muslim League in 1985.
