= G. M. Banatwala =

Indian politician

Gulam Mehmood Banatwalla
- G. M. Banatwalla

Member of Maharashtra Legislative Assembly
- In office 1967–1977
- Preceded by: Established
- Succeeded by: Abdulkadar Ibrahim Chorwadwala
- Constituency: Umarkhadi, Maharashtra

Member of Parliament, Lok Sabha
- In office 1977–1989
- Preceded by: M. K. Krishnan
- Succeeded by: Ebrahim Sulaiman Sait
- Constituency: Ponnani, Kerala
- In office 1996–1999
- Preceded by: Ebrahim Sulaiman Sait
- Succeeded by: E. Ahamed
- Constituency: Ponnani, Kerala

Personal details
- Born: 15 August 1933 Bombay (British India)
- Died: 25 June 2008 (aged 74) Mumbai
- Party: Indian Union Muslim League
- Spouse: Ayesha Banatwalla
- Parents: Haji Noor Mohamed (father); Ayesha (mother)
- Education: MCom
- Alma mater: Sydenham College of Commerce and Economics, Bombay; S. T. College, Bombay
- Occupation: Social worker; Politician

Gulam Mehmood Banatwalla (15 August 1933 – 25 June 2008), also spelled as Banatwala, was an Indian politician and social worker from Mumbai. Banatwalla, a "firebrand orator" and intellectual, was regarded as the pan-India face of the Indian Muslim community.

Banatwalla was born in Bombay, in then-British India, to Haji Noor Mohamed and Ayesha in a Cutchi Memon family. He studied at Sydenham College of Commerce and Economics and S.T. College, Bombay. He married Ayesha in February 1960.

He was elected to the Maharashtra Legislative Assembly in 1967 and 1972 from (Umarkhadi, Bombay). He later served seven terms in the Loksabha, from Ponnani in Kerala, between 1977 – 1989 and 1996 – 2004. He also served as the national president of Indian Union Muslim League from 1993 to 2008. He was a member of the All India Muslim Personal Law Board.

Banatwalla never spoke Malayalam and addressed the people of Kerala in English. Banatwalla, aged 74, died on 25 June 2008. He had no children.

== Books by G. M. Banatwala ==
- Religion and Politics in India
- Muslim League
- Azadi Ke Bad (in Urdu)

Banatwala also contributed numerous articles in various journals both in English and Urdu.
