= Vengara Assembly constituency =

Constituency of the Kerala legislative assembly in India

Vengara
- Constituency No. 41 for the Kerala Legislative Assembly
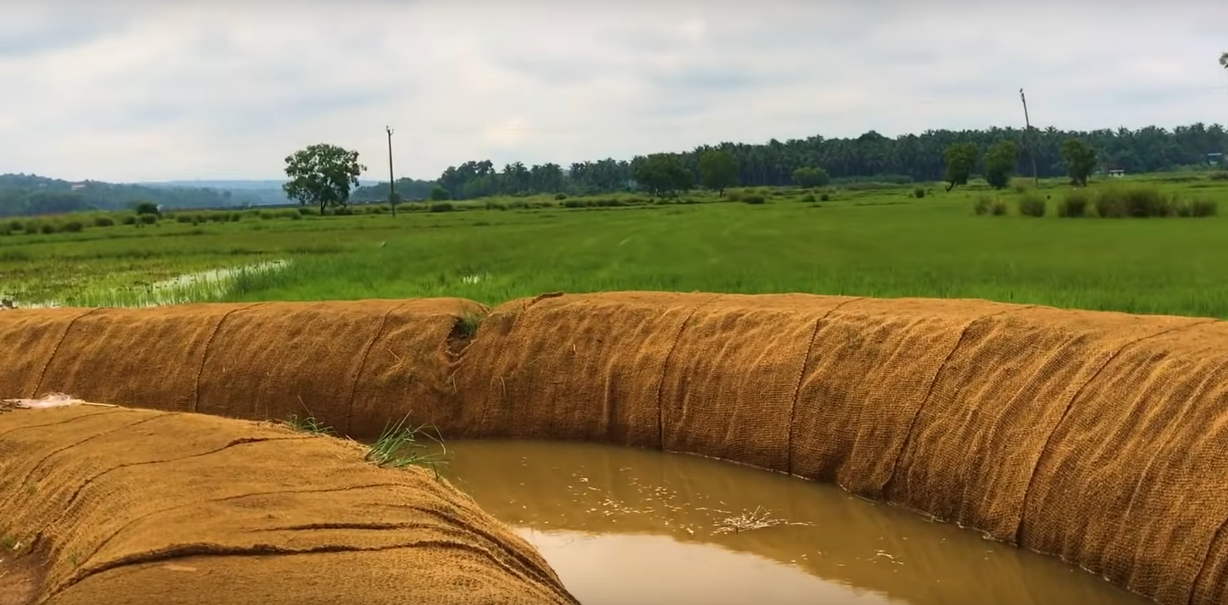
- Kooriyad field in Vengara

Constituency details
- Country: India
- Region: South India
- State: Kerala
- District: Malappuram
- Established: 2008
- Total electors: 1,85,356 (2021)
- Reservation: None

Member of Legislative Assembly
- 16th Kerala Legislative Assembly
- Incumbent K. M. Shaji
- Party: IUML
- Alliance: UDF
- Elected year: 2026

Vengara State assembly constituency is one of the 140 state legislative assembly constituencies in Kerala in southern India. It is also one of the seven state legislative assembly constituencies included in Malappuram Lok Sabha constituency. As of the 2026 Assembly elections, the current MLA is K.M. Shaji of IUML.

== Local self-governed segments ==
Vengara Assembly constituency is composed of the following local self-governed segments:

Sl no.	Name	Status (Grama panchayat/Municipality)	Taluk
1	Vengara	Grama panchayat	Tirurangadi
2	Abdu Rahiman Nagar	Grama panchayat	Tirurangadi
3	Kannamangalam	Grama panchayat	Tirurangadi
4	Oorakam	Grama panchayat	Tirurangadi
5	Parappur	Grama panchayat	Tirurangadi
6	Othukkungal	Grama panchayat	Tirurangadi

Vengara Assembly constituency

== Members of Legislative Assembly ==
The following list contains all members of Kerala Legislative Assembly who have represented Vengara Assembly constituency during the period of various assemblies:

Key

IUML

Election	Niyama Sabha	Member	Party	Tenure
2011	13th	P. K. Kunhalikutty	IUML	2011 – 2016
2016	14th	P. K. Kunhalikutty	IUML	2016 - 2017
2017*	14th	K. N. A. Khader	IUML	2017 - 2021
2021	15th	P. K. Kunhalikutty	IUML	2021-2026
2026	16th	K. M. Shaji	IUML	2026-

*by-election

== Election results ==
Percentage change (±%) denotes the change in the number of votes from the immediate previous election.

=== 2026 ===
2026 Kerala Legislative Assembly election: Vengara
Party	Candidate	Votes	%	±%
IUML	K. M. Shaji	95,863		
Independent	Sabah Kundupuzhakkal	65,538		
BJP	V. N. Jayakrishnan	6,126		
NOTA	None of the above	1,171		
Independent	Abdul Rafeeq Chemban	1,145		
Independent	K. M. Shaji Shaimalayam	305		
Independent	U. P. Shaji Ullattu Parambil	141		
Margin of victory		30,325		
Turnout		1,70,289		
IUML hold		Swing		

=== 2021 ===
There were 1,85,356 registered voters in the constituency for the 2021 Kerala Assembly election.

2021 Kerala Legislative Assembly election: Vengara
Party	Candidate	Votes	%	±%
IUML	P. K. Kunhalikutty	70,381	53.50%	▲0.31
CPI(M)	P. Jiji	39,785	30.24%	▼3.94
Independent	Sabah Kundupuzhakkal	11,255	8.56%	▲8.56
BJP	Preman Master	5,968	4.54%	▼0.13
WPOI	E. K. Kunhahammed Kutty Master	2,051	1.56%	▲1.56
BSP	Keeran	1,060	0.81%	▲0.81
NOTA	None of the above	787	0.60%	▲0.19
DSJP	Ananyakumari Alex	135	0.10%	▲0.10
Independent	Adil Abdurahman Thangal	129	0.10%	▲0.10
Margin of victory		30,596	23.26%	▲4.25
Turnout		1,31,551	70.97%	▼1.16
IUML hold		Swing	▲0.31	

=== 2017 by-election ===
Vengara Assembly constituency held a by-election due to the election of the sitting MLA P. K. Kunhalikutty into the Indian Lok Sabha in 2017. There were 1,70,006 registered voters for the subsequent by-election.

2017 Kerala Legislative Assembly By-election: Vengara
Party	Candidate	Votes	%	±%
IUML	K. N. A. Khader	65,227	53.19%	▼6.82%
CPI(M)	Adv. P. P. Basheer	41,917	34.18%	▲5.81%
SDPI	Adv. K. C. Naseer	8,648	7.05%	▲4.51%
BJP	K. Janachandran Master	5,728	4.67%	▼1.20%
NOTA	None of the above	502	0.41%	▼0.03%
Independent	Adv. Hamza Karumannil	442	0.36%	N/A
Independent	Sreenivas	159	0.13%	N/A
Margin of victory		23,310	19.01%	▼12.63%
Turnout		1,22,623	72.13%	▲1.23
IUML hold		Swing	▼6.82%	

=== 2016 ===
There were 1,69,639 registered voters in Vengara Assembly constituency for the 2016 Kerala Assembly election.

2016 Kerala Legislative Assembly election: Vengara
Party	Candidate	Votes	%	±%
IUML	P. K. Kunhalikutty	72,181	60.01%	▼3.43
CPI(M)	Adv. P. P. Basheer	34,124	28.37%	▲3.35
BJP	P. T. Ali Haji	7,055	5.87%	▲2.44
SDPI	Kallen Aboobacker Master	3,049	2.54%	▼2.17
WPOI	Surendran Karippuzha	1,864	1.55%	−
PDP	Subair Swabahi	1,472	1.22%	−
NOTA	None of the above	531	0.44%	−
Margin of victory		38,057	31.64%	▼6.78
Turnout		1,20,276	70.90%	▲1.93
IUML hold		Swing	▼3.43	

=== 2011 ===
There were 1,44,317 registered voters in the constituency for the 2011 election.

2011 Kerala Legislative Assembly election: Vengara
Party	Candidate	Votes	%	±%
IUML	P. K. Kunhalikutty	63,138	63.44%	
INL	K. P. Ismayil	24,901	25.02%	
SDPI	Abduil Majeed Faizi	4,683	4.71%	
BJP	Subrahmanian	3,417	3.43%	
Independent	K. P. Ismayil (Kalluparamban)	1,615	1.62%	
Independent	Kunhalikutty K. P.	1,079	1.08%	
BSP	Safarudeen	405	0.41%	
Independent	Ismayil K. T.	292	0.29%	
Margin of victory		38,237	38.42%	
Turnout		99,530	68.97%	
IUML win (new seat)				

== See also ==
- Vengara
- Malappuram district
- List of constituencies of the Kerala Legislative Assembly
- 2016 Kerala Legislative Assembly election
