= E. T. Mohammed Basheer =

Indian politician and social worker

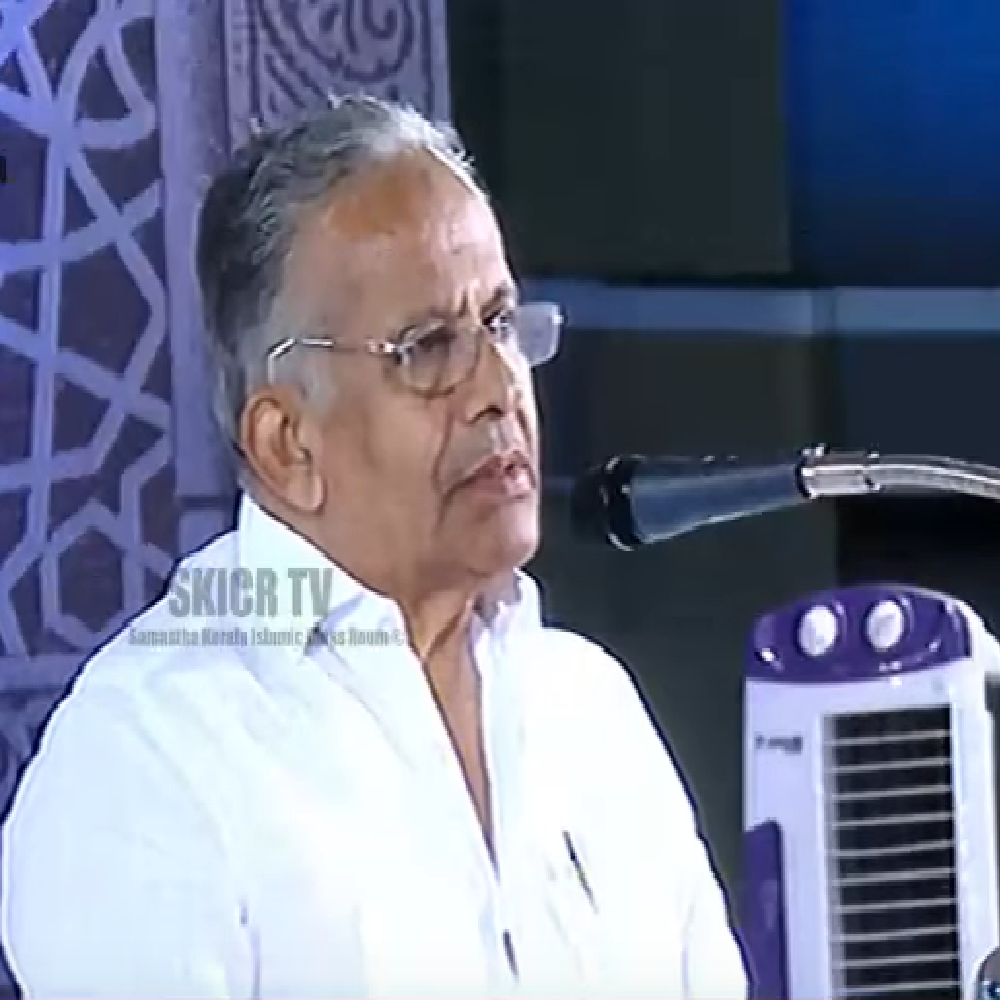

Member of Parliament, Lok Sabha
- Incumbent
- Assumed office 4 June 2024
- Preceded by: M. P. Abdussamad Samadani
- Constituency: Malappuram, Kerala
- In office 31 May 2009 – 4 June 2024
- Preceded by: E. Ahamed
- Succeeded by: M. P. Abdussamad Samadani
- Constituency: Ponnani, Kerala

Leader, Indian Union Muslim League, Lok Sabha
- Incumbent
- Assumed office 1 February 2017
- Preceded by: E. Ahamed

Minister for Education, Government of Kerala
- In office 2004–2006
- Chief Minister: Oommen Chandy
- Preceded by: Nalakath Soopy
- Succeeded by: M. A. Baby
- In office 1991–1996
- Chief Minister: K. Karunakaran; A.K Antony
- Preceded by: K. Chandrasekharan
- Succeeded by: P. J. Joseph

Member of Kerala Legislative Assembly
- In office 1991–2006
- Constituency: Tirur

Personal details
- Born: 1 July 1946 (age 80) Malappuram, Madras Presidency, British India
- Party: Indian Union Muslim League
- Spouse: Rukhiya Basheer
- Children: 3 sons and 1 daughter
- Website: mpofficeponnani.com

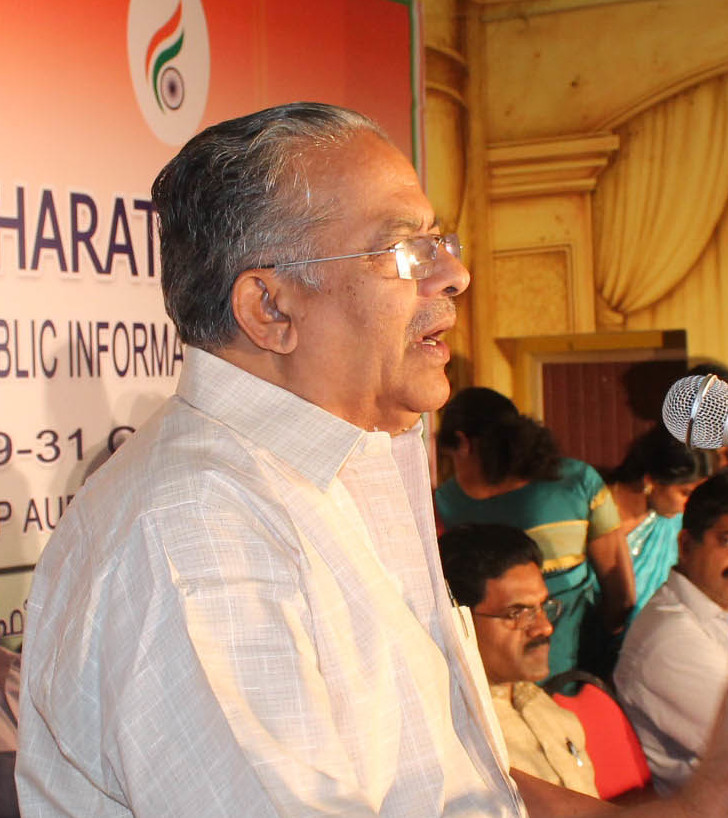
E. T. Muhammed Basheer speaking at the inauguration of the Bharat Nirman Public Information Campaign in Palakkad District on October 29, 2013.

E. T. Mohammed Basheer (born 1 July 1946) is an Indian politician and social worker who serves as the Member of Parliament from Malappuram Parliament Constituency of the Indian state Kerala.

Basheer was first elected to Kerala Legislative Assembly in 1985. He served as a Cabinet Minister in various ministries of the Government of Kerala. He served as the Minister for Education (1991–96 and 2001–06) under K. Karunakaran, A. K. Antony and Oommen Chandy. He has been a member of Parliament from 2009 (three terms, 2009, 2014 and 2019).

Basheer is the National Organising Secretary and Kerala State Party Secretary of Indian Union Muslim League. He also leads the League in Lok Sabha (the Lower House).

== Life and career ==
Basheer was born on 1 July 1946 to E. T. Moosakutty and Fathima at Mapram, Vazhakkad, in present-day Malappuram District. He entered politics through Muslim Students Federation (M. S. F.), the student wing of Indian Union Muslim League.

He later served as the Kondotty Mandalam Committee President, Malappuram District Committee Secretary and State Secretariat Member of Indian Union Muslim League.

He is married to Rukhiya Basheer.

=== Political career ===
Basheer actively engaged in trade union field and became Kerala State Secretary of Swatantra Thozhilali Union (S. T. U). He also worked as president of various trade unions affiliated to S. T. U. in industrial firms like:

- Mavoor Gwalior Rayons
- Malabar Cements, Palakkad, Edarikode Textiles
- Kerala Electrical and Allied, Kundara
- Malabar Spinning Mills, Kozhikode
- Modern Spinning Mills, Kozhikode
- Steel Complex, Kozhikode
- K. S. D. C. Kuttipuram

He was also Member in Kerala Agricultural University Senate, Kerala State Orphanage Control Board and Industries Relationship Committee.

=== As Minister for Education (1991–96 and 2001–06) ===
As Minister for Education, Basheer was instrumental in promoting the concept of Self-financing Colleges.

- Introduction of Grading System at the Secondary and Higher Secondary Levels.
- Establishment of Kannur University, Sanskrit University, Kaladi and National University of Advanced Legal Studies at Kochi.
- Expansion of information technology enabled education and the inclusion of information technology as a part of curriculum in Secondary Level.
- Implemented special package for the education and social upliftment of the physically and mentally handicapped children.

=== Committee Membership ===
1. Central Advisory Board of Education (C. A. B. E.)
2. Government of India Committee on Decentralisation of Education Management
3. Janardhana Reddy Commission on National Educational Policy
4. Minority Education Monitoring Committee

== Member of Legislative Assembly ==
Constituency	Election	Tenure	Assembly	Position	Chief Minister
Peringalam	1985 (by-election)	1985–87	7th KLA	Government	K. Karunakaran (1982–87)
Tirur	1991	1991–96	9th KLA	Government	K. Karunakaran (1991–95)
Tirur	1991	1991–96	9th KLA	Government	A. K. Antony (1995–96)
Tirur	1996	1996–01	10th KLA	Opposition	E. K. Nayanar (1996–01)
Tirur	2001	2001–06	11th KLA	Government	A. K. Antony (2001–04)
Tirur	2001	2001–06	11th KLA	Government	Oommen Chandy (2004–06)

== Minister in different Kerala ministries ==
Election	Ruling Front	Term	Chief Minister	Portfolio	Period
1991 (9th KLA)	U. D. F. (1991–96)	1991–95	K. Karunakaran	Education	1991–95
1991 (9th KLA)	U. D. F. (1991–96)	1995–96	A. K. Antony	Education	1995–96
2001 (11 KLA)	U. D. F. (2001–06)	2004–06	Oommen Chandy	Education	2004–06

== Member of Parliament ==
Alliance	Constituency	Election	House	Tenure	Position
United Progressive Alliance (U. P. A.)	Ponnani	2009	15th House	2009–14	Government
United Progressive Alliance (U. P. A.)	Ponnani	2014	16th House	2014–19	Opposition
United Progressive Alliance (U. P. A.)	Ponnani	2019	17th House	2019–2024	Opposition
INDIA Alliance	Malappuram	2024	18th House	2024–present	Opposition

Party political offices
Preceded by E Ahamed	Leader of the Indian Union Muslim League Party in the 16th Lok Sabha; 2017–Present	Incumbent
