= Swatantra Thozhilali Union =

Trade union in India

STU
- Swatantra Thozhilali Union (STU)
- സ്വതന്ത്ര തൊഴിലാളി യൂണിയൻ
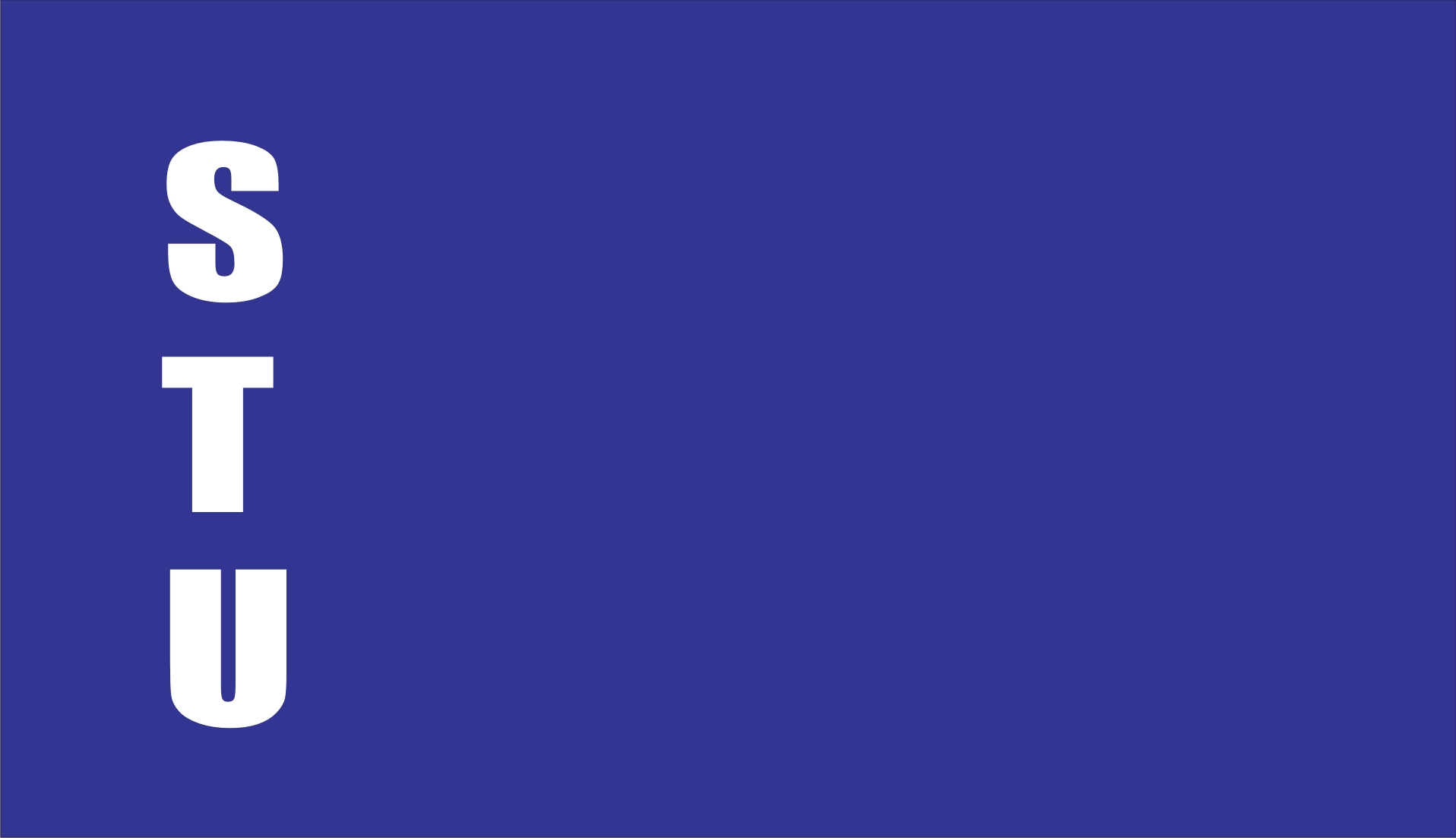
- Founded: May 5, 1957
- Headquarters: Kozhikode
- Location: India
- Parent organization: Indian Union Muslim League
- Affiliations: trade union

The Swatantra Thozhilali Union, also known as Swatantra Trade Union (STU), is the oldest trade union federation in India. It is associated with the Indian Union Muslim League.

== History ==
May 5, 1957 - That is when the Kerala State Independent Workers Union State Committee was formed. When the organization was born at the office of the Independent Handloom Workers Union in Valiyangadi, Kozhikode, there was no beating. All those present had vowed to undertake a great mission. The organization was able to provide benefits to all workers and create better working conditions by eliminating labor exploitation.

== Principal mass organizations of STU ==
- State Construction Workers Union
- Motor and Engineering Workers Union
- Kerala Agricultural Workers Federation
- State Headload and General Workers Union
- Sewing Workers Union
- Kerala Artists 'Skilled and General Workers' Union
- Independent Fishermen's Union
- Fish Supply Workers Union
- Real Estate Workers' Union
- Heritage College Mystery Folk Medicine Federation
- Newspaper Agent and Workers Union
- Anganwadi Workers and Helpers Organization
- Asha Workers Union
- Innovative Marketing and Workers' Union
- National Rural Employment Guarantee Scheme Workers Union

== Notable leaders ==
- E. T. Mohammed Basheer Member of Parliament, Lok Sabha and former Minister of Education, Kerala | Kerala State Secretary of S.T.U
- V. K. Ebrahimkunju Kerala Minister for Industry and Social Welfare | Kerala State Vice President of S.T.U

== See also ==
- Indian Trade Unions
- Indian Union Muslim League
