= Malappuram Lok Sabha constituency =

Lok Sabha Constituency in Kerala

Coordinates: 11.1°N 76.1°E

Malappuram KL-6
- Lok Sabha constituency
- Malappuram Lok Sabha constituency

Constituency details
- Country: India
- Region: South India
- State: Kerala
- Assembly constituencies: Kondotty; Manjeri; Perinthalmanna; Mankada; Malappuram; Vengara; Vallikkunnu
- Established: 1952
- Total electors: 13,69,878 (2019)
- Reservation: None

Member of Parliament
- 18th Lok Sabha
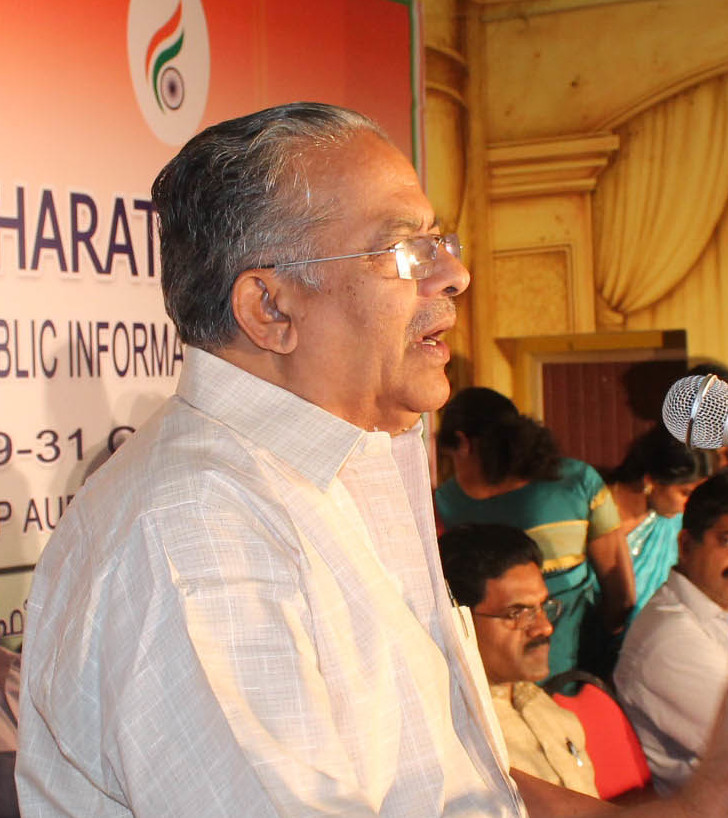
- Incumbent E. T. Mohammed Basheer
- Party: IUML
- Alliance: UDF
- Elected year: 2024
- Preceded by: M. P. Abdussamad Samadani

Malappuram Lok Sabha constituency is one of the 20 Lok Sabha (parliamentary) constituencies in Kerala state in southern India. It is one amongst the 1st Lok Sabha parliament constituencies of India.

== Assembly segments ==
Malappuram Lok Sabha constituency is composed of the following assembly segments:

No	Name	District	Member	Party	2024 Lead
33	Kondotty	Malappuram	T. P. Ashrafali	IUML	IUML
37	Manjeri	Malappuram	M. Rahmathulla	IUML	IUML
38	Perinthalmanna	Malappuram	Najeeb Kanthapuram	IUML	IUML
39	Mankada	Malappuram	Manjalamkuzhi Ali	IUML	IUML
40	Malappuram	Malappuram	P. K. Kunhalikutty	IUML	IUML
41	Vengara	Malappuram	K. M. Shaji	IUML	IUML
42	Vallikkunnu	Malappuram	T. V. Ibrahim	IUML	IUML

== Members of Parliament ==
Year	Member	Party
As Malappuram Lok Sabha constituency
1952	B. Pocker	Indian Union Muslim League
As Manjeri Lok Sabha constituency
1957	B. Pocker	Independent politician
1962	M. Muhammad Ismail	Indian Union Muslim League
1967	M. Muhammad Ismail	Indian Union Muslim League
1971	M. Muhammad Ismail	Indian Union Muslim League
1977	Ebrahim Sulaiman Sait	Indian Union Muslim League
1980	Ebrahim Sulaiman Sait	Indian Union Muslim League
1984	Ebrahim Sulaiman Sait	Indian Union Muslim League
1989	Ebrahim Sulaiman Sait	Indian Union Muslim League
1991	E. Ahammed	Indian Union Muslim League
1996	E. Ahammed	Indian Union Muslim League
1998	E. Ahammed	Indian Union Muslim League
1999	E. Ahammed	Indian Union Muslim League
2004	T. K. Hamza	Communist Party of India (Marxist)
As Malappuram Lok Sabha constituency
2009	E. Ahammed	Indian Union Muslim League
2014	E. Ahammed	Indian Union Muslim League
2017 (Note: By-election)	P. K. Kunhalikutty	Indian Union Muslim League
2019	P. K. Kunhalikutty	Indian Union Muslim League
2021 (Note: By-election)	Abdussamad Samadani	Indian Union Muslim League
2024	E. T. Muhammed Basheer	Indian Union Muslim League

== Election results ==
Vote share of Winning candidates
2024	59.35%
2021 (By-Poll)	48.96%
2019	57.00%
2017 (By-Poll)	55.10%
2014	51.29%
2009	54.64%
2004	47.05%
1999	54.01%
1998	49.65%
1996	48.46%
1991	51.32%
1989	49.84%
1984	50.90%
1980	53.61%
1977	61.27%
1971	67.60%
1967	68.54%
1962	40.50%
1957	43.49%
1952	38.98%

=== General Elections 2029 ===
2029 Indian general election: Malappuram
Party	Candidate	Votes	%	±%
UDF				
LDF				
NDA				
NOTA	None of the above			
Margin of victory				
Turnout				
		Swing		

=== 2024 ===
2024 Indian general election: Malappuram
Party	Candidate	Votes	%	±%
IUML	E. T. Mohammed Basheer	644,006	59.35	▲11.39
CPI(M)	V. Vaseef	3,43,888	31.69	▼6.84
BJP	Dr. Abdussalam	85,361	7.87	▲1.60
NOTA	None of the above	6,766	0.63	▲0.24
Majority		3,00,118	27.66	▲2.52
Turnout		10,87,395	73.44	▼2.06
Registered electors				
IUML hold		Swing	▲11.39	

By Assembly Segments
No.	Status (Assembly Constituency)	Votes			Lead
No.	Status (Assembly Constituency)	E. T. Mohammed Basheer	V. Vaseef	M. Abdusalam	Lead
33	Kondotty	95,025	50,038	14,150	44,987
37	Manjeri	92,346	50,026	12,823	42,320
38	Perinthalmanna	85,319	58,520	10,486	26,799
39	Mankada	92,383	51,350	10,604	41,033
40	Malappuram	104,787	50,706	7,983	54,041
41	Vengara	90,142	33,745	7,414	56,397
42	Vallikkunnu	80,307	47,125	21,069	33,182

=== 2021 by-election ===
Malappuram Lok Sabha Constituency went for bypoll on 6 April 2021 along with the 2021 Kerala Legislative Assembly Election. On May 2, the results were announced along with the results of the Legislative Assembly Elections. Former Rajya Sabha MP Abdussamad Samadani won the election by a margin of 1,14,615 votes.

Bye-Election, 2021: Malappuram
Party	Candidate	Votes	%	±%
IUML	M. P. Abdussamad Samadani	538,248	48.96	▼8.05
CPI(M)	V. P. Sanu	4,23,633	38.53	▲6.66
BJP	A. P. Abdullakutty	68,935	6.27	▼1.69
SDPI	Tasleem Rehmani	46,758	4.25	▲2.4
NOTA	None of the Above	4,259	0.39	▼0.04
Margin of victory		1,14,692	10.43	
Turnout		11,02,537	76.26	
IUML hold		Swing	▼8.05	

=== 2019 ===
2019 Indian general election: Malappuram
Party	Candidate	Votes	%	±%
IUML	P. K. Kunhalikutty	589,873	57.00	▲1.90
CPI(M)	V. P. Sanu	329,720	31.86	▼4.95
BJP	Unnikrishnan	82,332	7.96	▲0.94
SDPI	Abdul Majeed Faizy	19,106	1.85	
NOTA	None of the Above	4,480	0.43	▼0.01
IND	Nissar Methar	3,687	0.36	
BSP	Adv. Praveen Kumar	2,294	0.22	
IND	N. K. Sanu	2,203	0.21	
IND	K. P. Abdul Salam	923	0.09	
Majority		260,153	25.14	▲6.85
Turnout		1,034,618	75.49	▲4.27
IUML hold		Swing		

By Assembly Segments
No.	Status (Assembly Constituency)	Votes			Lead
No.	Status (Assembly Constituency)	P. K. Kunhalikkutty	V. P. Sanu	V. Unnikrishnan	Lead
33	Kondotty	87,561	48,248	13,832	39,313
37	Manjeri	85,579	49,531	11,595	36,048
38	Perinthalmanna	79,867	56,829	9,851	23,038
39	Mankada	85,193	49,928	10,160	35,265
40	Malappuram	94,704	49,728	7,343	44,976
41	Vengara	82,388	30,500	7,504	51,888
42	Vallikkunnu	73,861	44,339	21,802	29,522

=== 2017 by-election ===
Bye-Election, 2017: Malappuram
Party	Candidate	Votes	%	±%
IUML	P. K. Kunhalikutty	515,330	55.10	▲3.81
CPI(M)	M. B. Faisal	3,44,307	36.81	▲8.34
BJP	N. Sreeprakash	65,675	7.02	▼0.56
IND	Muhammed Faisal	1,698	0.18	N/A
IND	P. P. A. Sageer	1,469	0.16	N/A
IND	K. Shajimon	1,027	0.11	N/A
IND	P. K. Kunjalikutty	720	0.08	N/A
IND	A. K. Shaji	565	0.06	N/A
IND	Muhammed Musliyar N.	445	0.05	N/A
NOTA	None of the Above	4,098	0.44	▼2.12
Majority		1,71,023	18.29	▼4.53
Turnout		9,35,991	71.22	▼0.05
IUML hold		Swing	▲3.81	

=== 2014 ===
2014 Indian general election: Malappuram
Party	Candidate	Votes	%	±%
IUML	E. Ahamed	437,723	51.29	▼3.35
CPI(M)	P. K. Sainaba	242,984	28.47	▼11.41
BJP	Adv. N. Sreeprakash	64,705	7.58	▲2.98
SDPI	Nasarudheen Elamaram	47,853	5.61	
WPOI	Prof. P. Ismail	29,216	3.42	
NOTA	None of the Above	21,829	2.56	
BSP	Ilyas	2,745	0.32	▼0.56
IND	Gopinathan N.	2,491	0.29	
IND	Dr. M. V. Ibrahim	1,376	0.16	
IND	Sreedharan	1,330	0.16	
IND	Anwar Shakeel Omar	1,215	0.14	
Majority		194,739	22.82	▲8.06
Turnout		853,467	71.26	▼5.55
IUML hold		Swing		

By Assembly Segments
No.	Status (Assembly Constituency)	Votes			Lead
No.	Status (Assembly Constituency)	E. Ahammed	P. K. Sainaba	N. Sreeprakash	Lead
33	Kondotty	65,846	34,129	10,960	31,717
37	Manjeri	64,677	38,615	10,656	26,062
38	Perinthalmanna	59,210	48,596	7,356	10,614
39	Mankada	59,738	36,277	8,279	23,461
40	Malappuram	72,304	35,980		36,324
41	Vengara	60,323	17,691		42,632
42	Vallikkunnu	55,422	31,487	15,982	23,935

=== 2009 ===
2009 Indian general election: Malappuram
Party	Candidate	Votes	%	±%
IUML	E. Ahamed	427,940	54.64	▲12.85
CPI(M)	T. K. Hamza	312,343	39.88	▼7.17
BJP	Adv. N. Aravindan	36,016	4.60	▼4.67
BSP	Adv. E. A. Aboobacker	6,931	0.88	▲0.02
Majority		115,597	14.76	▲9.50
Turnout		783,230	76.81	
IUML gain from CPI(M)		Swing		

=== 2004 ===
2004 Indian general election: Manjeri
Party	Candidate	Votes	%	±%
CPI(M)	T. K. Hamza	426,920	47.05	▲8.27
IUML	K. P. A. Majeed	379,177	41.79	▼12.22
BJP	Uma Unni	84,149	9.27	
IND	Anwar Shakeel Omar	9,213	1.02	
BSP	C. Abdul Muneer	7,824	0.86	
Majority		47,743	5.26	▼9.97
Turnout		907,283		
CPI(M) gain from IUML		Swing		

=== 1999 ===
1999 Indian general election: Manjeri
Party	Candidate	Votes	%	±%
IUML	E. Ahamed	437,563	54.01	▲4.36
CPI(M)	Adv. I. T. Najeeb	314,152	38.78	▲2.27
JD(U)	Kalathingal Mohiyudheen	58,451	7.21	
Majority		123,411	15.23	▲2.09
Turnout		816,573	67.05	▼2.16
IUML hold		Swing		

=== 1998 ===
1998 Indian general election: Manjeri
Party	Candidate	Votes	%	±%
IUML	E. Ahamed	400,609	49.65	▲1.19
CPI(M)	Adv. K. V. Salahuddin	294,600	36.51	▼4.86
BJP	Prof. Sumathy Haridas	79,546	9.86	▲2.83
INL	A. P. Abdul Vahab	32,191	3.99	▲3.82
Majority		106,009	13.14	▲6.05
Turnout		813,036	69.21	▲0.20
IUML hold		Swing		

=== 1996 ===
1996 Indian general election: Manjeri
Party	Candidate	Votes	%	±%
IUML	E. Ahamed	376,001	48.46	▼2.86
CPI(M)	C. H. Ashiq	321,030	41.37	
BJP	Cherukattu Vasudevan	54,550	7.03	▼0.03
PDP	Pandalam Abdul Majeed	11,781	1.52	
INL	Puthalath Anver	1,354	0.17	
IND	5 Independent Candidates	11,217	1.45	
Majority		54,971	7.09	▼5.12
Turnout		795,721	69.01	▼1.42
IUML hold		Swing		

=== 1991 ===
1991 Indian general election: Manjeri
Party	Candidate	Votes	%	±%
IUML	E. Ahamed	375,456	51.32	▲1.48
IND	V. Venugopal	286,133	39.11	
BJP	Ahalya Sankar	51,634	7.06	▲0.54
IND	7 Independent Candidates	18,320	2.51	
Majority		89,323	12.21	▲3.50
Turnout		742,123	70.43	▼9.29
IUML hold		Swing		

=== 1989 ===
1989 Indian general election: Manjeri
Party	Candidate	Votes	%	±%
IUML	Ebrahim Sulaiman Sait	401,975	49.84	▼1.06
IND	K. V. Salahuddin	331,693	41.13	
BJP	Ahalya Sankar	52,557	6.52	▼1.15
IND	P. K. Janardhanan	15,345	1.90	
BSP	Ali Sahib Shoukathji	976	0.12	
JP	Saifuddin	244	0.03	
IND	10 Independent Candidates	3,668	0.47	
Majority		70,282	8.71	▼3.89
Turnout		811,009	79.72	▲2.31
IUML hold		Swing		

=== 1984 ===
1984 Indian general election: Manjeri
Party	Candidate	Votes	%	±%
IUML	Ebrahim Sulaman Sait	287,538	50.90	▼2.71
CPI(M)	E. K. Imbichi Bava	216,363	38.30	
BJP	O. Rajagopal	43,301	7.67	
IND	Palliyali Kunhmutty	12,753	2.26	
IND	Karatachali Nafesakutty	2,954	0.52	
IND	Noorengal Mohammed	1,125	0.20	
IND	Iqubal Pandikkad	864	0.15	
Majority		71,175	12.60	▲4.59
Turnout		570,262	77.41	▲12.78
IUML hold		Swing		

=== 1980 ===
1980 Indian general election: Manjeri
Party	Candidate	Votes	%	±%
IUML	Ebrahim Sulaiman Sait	231,401	53.61	▼7.66
AIML	K. Moideenkutty Haji	196,820	45.60	▲6.87
IND	Chembakassery Ramachandran	3,387	0.78	
Majority		34,581	8.01	▼14.53
Turnout		435,656	64.63	▼13.08
IUML hold		Swing		

=== 1977 ===
1977 Indian general election: Manjeri
Party	Candidate	Votes	%	±%
IUML	Ebrahim Sulaiman Sait	264,235	61.27	▼6.33
AIML	B. M. Hussain	167,034	38.73	
Majority		97,201	22.54	▼24.70
Turnout		442,328	77.71	▲31.90
IUML hold		Swing		

=== 1971 ===
1971 Indian general election: Manjeri
Party	Candidate	Votes	%	±%
IUML	M. Muhammad Ismail	171,496	67.60	▼0.94
IND	S. P. Muhammed Ali	51,659	20.36	
ABJS	K. K. Radhakrishnan	30,535	12.04	
Majority		119,837	47.24	▲10.16
Turnout		256,834	45.81	▼20.83
IUML hold		Swing		

=== 1967 ===
1967 Indian general election: Manjeri
Party	Candidate	Votes	%	±%
IUML	M. Muhammad Ismail	198,732	68.54	▲28.04
INC	A. N. Beevi	91,238	31.46	▲10.66
Majority		107,494	37.08	▲35.28
Turnout		302,322	66.64	▲9.24
IUML hold		Swing		

=== 1962 ===
1962 Indian general election: Manjeri
Party	Candidate	Votes	%	±%
IUML	M. Muhammad Ismail	97,290	40.50	
CPI	Muhammad Kunju	92,962	38.70	▲16.55
INC	Shoukkathali Puthanveettil	49,977	20.80	▼13.56
Majority		4,328	1.80	▼7.33
Turnout		247,891	57.40	▲2.63
IUML gain from Independent		Swing		

=== 1957 ===
1957 Indian general election: Manjeri
Party	Candidate	Votes	%	±%
IND	B. Pocker	99,777	43.49	
INC	Kunhikoya Palat	78,822	34.36	▲3.71
CPI	K. P. Mohamed Koya	50,803	22.15	▼8.23
Majority		20,955	9.13	▲0.80
Turnout		229,402	54.77	▼0.43
Independent gain from IUML		Swing		

=== 1952 ===
1952 Indian general election: Malappuram
Party	Candidate	Votes	%	±%
IUML	B. Pocker	79,470	38.98	
INC	T. V. Chathukutty Nair	62,494	30.65	
CPI	Kumhali Karikedan	61,935	30.38	
Majority		16,976	8.33	
Turnout		203,899	55.20	
IUML win (new seat)				

== See also ==
- Malappuram district
- Manjeri (Lok Sabha constituency)
- 2019 Indian general election in Kerala
