= Muslim Women's League =

Women's Wing of the Indian Union Muslim League (IUML)

Muslim Women's League (MWL)
- President: Beegam Fathima Muzaffer
- Secretary: Noorbina Rasheed
- Headquarters: Calicut
- Ideology: Communitarianism

IUML-Muslim Women's League, or simply Vanitha League is the women's wing of the Indian Union Muslim League (IUML) of India Noorbina Rasheed is the National General secretary.

== National office bearers ==
Name	Position	State or U T
Beegam Fathima Muzaffer	National President	Tamil Nadu
Noorbina Rasheed	National General Secretary	Kerala
Jayanthi Rajan	General Secretary	Kerala

=== Office bearers of Kerala State Committee ===
Name	Position
Suhara Mampad	President
kulsu	General Secretary
Seema Yahya	treasurer

== women's students wing ==
=== Haritha ===
Haritha was part of IUML-Women's League, haritha formed in 2012 July to provide space of collectivization to the female students in campuses of Kerala in India, but its participation in electoral politics was through the MSF, limiting it to a tributary of sorts. The parent body IUML and the electoral face MSF, Decided to interfere in the affairs of Haritha.

== See also ==
- Indian Union Muslim League
