= Muslim Students Federation (Indian Union Muslim League) =

Student organisation in India

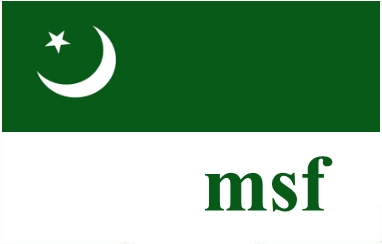
- President: PV Ahmed Saju
- Treasurer: Ateeb Khan
- Founded: 1 September 1937
- Headquarters: Chennai
- Mother party: Indian Union Muslim League
- Website: www.msfindia.net; msfindia.net

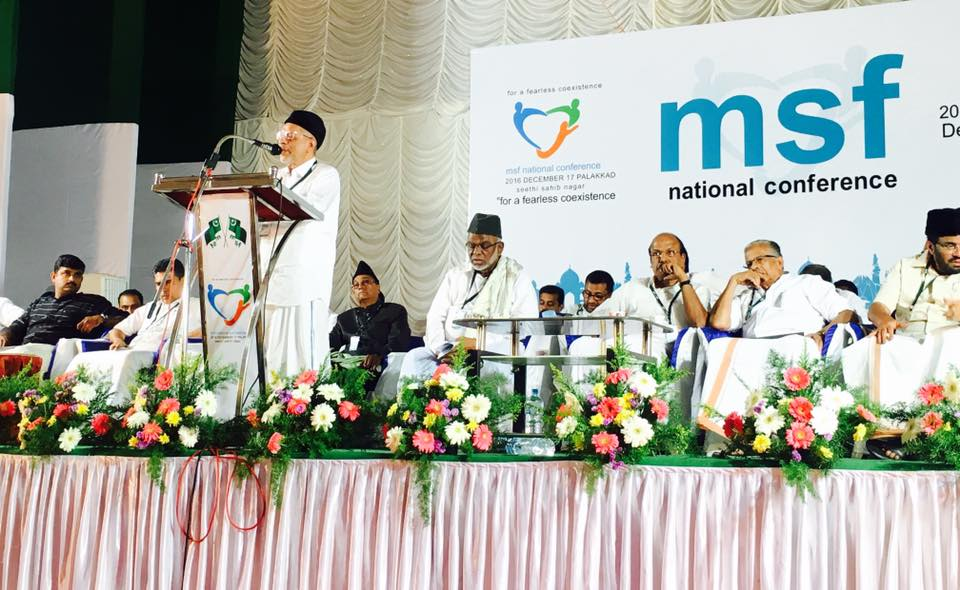
Community leader Sayed Hyderali Shihab Thangal in an MSF event in Kerala

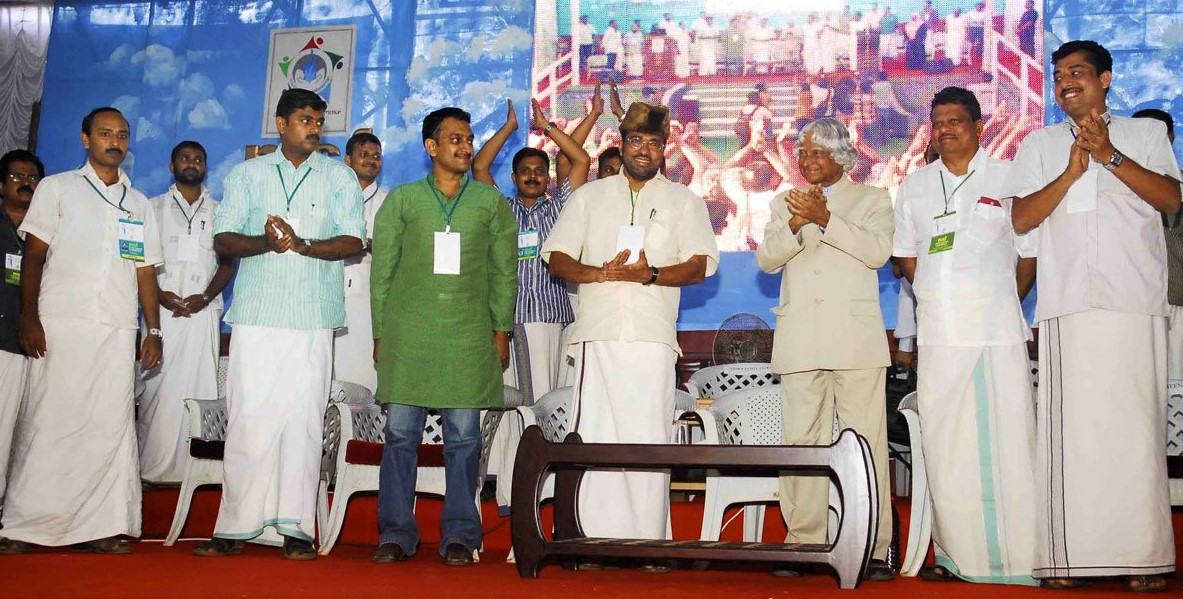
Former president of INDIA DR APJ Abdul Kalam inaugurating Muslim Students Federation Campus Conference in 2011 at Calicut

Activist Medha Patkar on an MSF at JNU

The Muslim Students Federation (MSF) is the student wing of the Indian Union Muslim League party which is based in Kerala.

MSF is principally active in Kerala universities and college campuses. P.V Ahmed Saju and S. H. Muhammed Arshad currently serve as the National President and National General Secretary of the MSF.

Muslim Students Federation is the largest Muslim students organisation in Kerala. Indian Union Muslim League leaders C. H. Mohammed Koya, Minister of Education in various Kerala Governments and E. Ahamed, Union Minister of State, Ministry of External Affairs, were associated with the Muslim Students Federation.

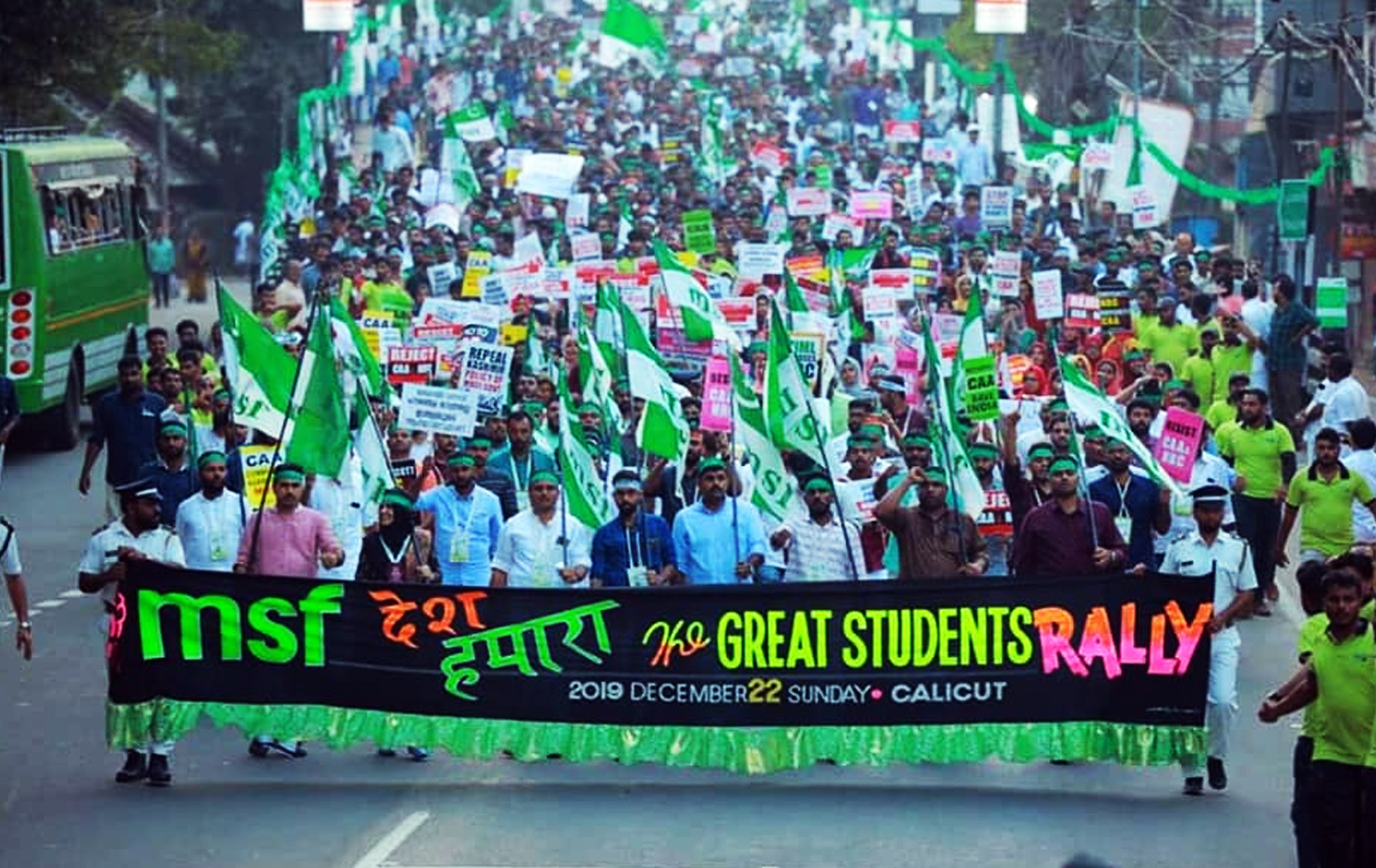
Muslim Students Federation march in Kozhikode

== Notable former members ==
- C. H. Mohammed Koya, former Chief Minister in Kerala
- E. Ahamed, former Union Minister of State, Ministry of External Affairs
- K. M. Kader Mohideen, national President Indian Union Muslim League, Former Member of Parliament (Lok Sabha)
- P. K. Kunhalikutty, former Minister for Industries in Kerala
- E. T. Mohammed Basheer, former Minister of Education in Kerala

== Related Organisations ==
- Muslim Students Federation (Kerala unit)
- Haritha (organisation)
