= Ponnani Lok Sabha constituency =

Lok Sabha Constituency in Kerala

Coordinates: 10.8°N 75.9°E

- Indian electoral constituency

Constituency details
- Country: India
- Region: South India
- State: Kerala
- Assembly constituencies: Tirurangadi; Tanur; Tirur; Kottakkal; Thavanur; Ponnani; Thrithala
- Established: 1952
- Total electors: 13,56,408 (2019)
- Reservation: None

Member of Parliament
- 18th Lok Sabha
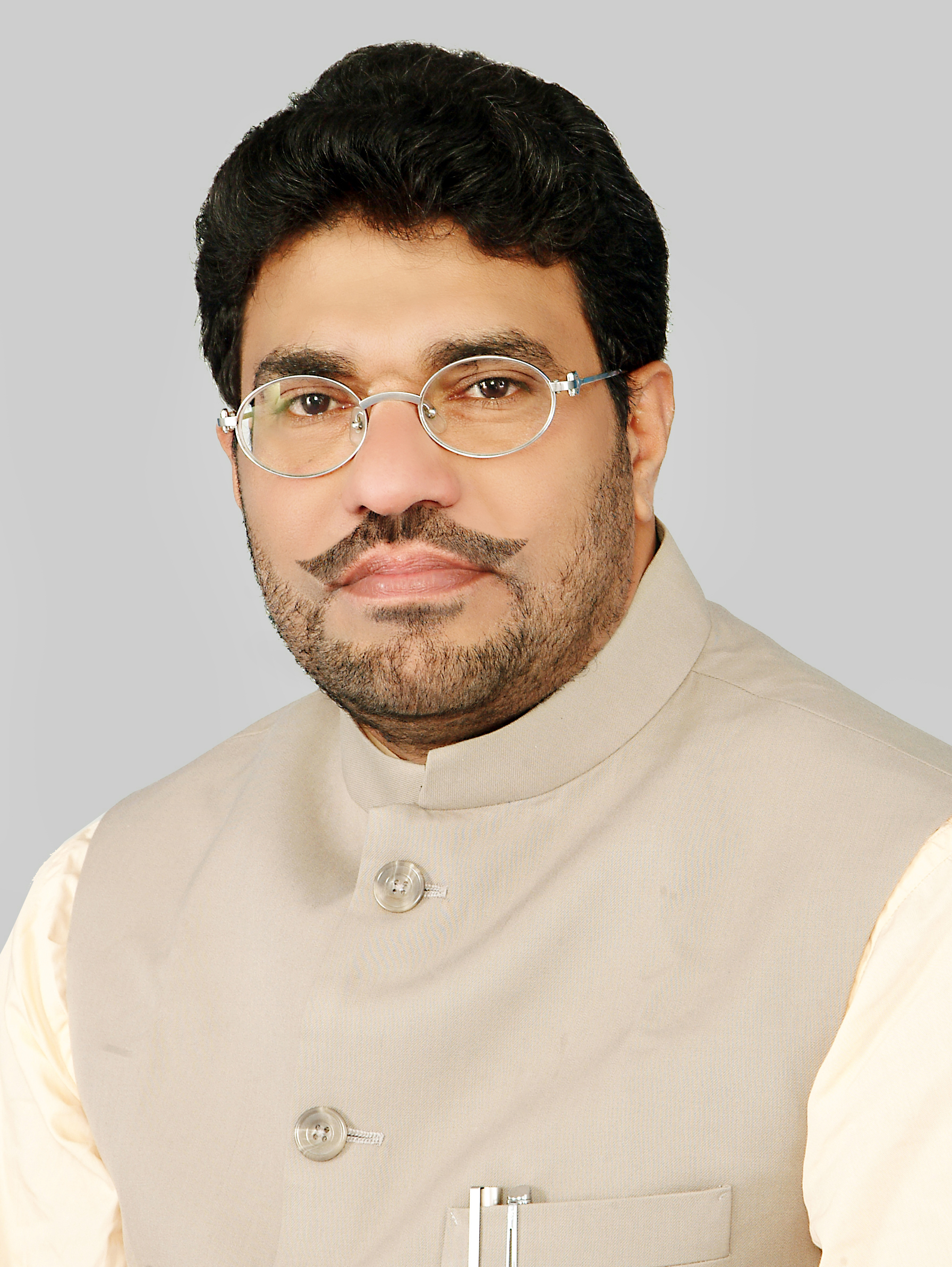
- Incumbent M. P. Abdussamad Samadani
- Party: IUML
- Alliance: UDF
- Elected year: 2024
- Preceded by: E. T. Mohammed Basheer

Ponnani Lok Sabha constituency is one of the 20 Lok Sabha (parliamentary) constituencies in Kerala state in southern India.

== Assembly segments ==
Ponnani Lok Sabha constituency is composed of the following assembly segments:

No	Name	District	Member	Party	2024 Lead
43	Tirurangadi	Malappuram	P. M. A. Sameer	IUML	IUML
44	Tanur	Malappuram	P. K. Navas	IUML	IUML
45	Tirur	Malappuram	Kurukkoli Moideen	IUML	IUML
46	Kottakkal	Malappuram	K. K. Abid Hussain Thangal	IUML	IUML
47	Thavanur	Malappuram	V. S. Joy	INC	IUML
48	Ponnani	Malappuram	K. P. Noushad Ali	INC	IUML
49	Thrithala	Palakkad	V. T. Balram	INC	IUML

== Members of Parliament ==
Election	Member	Party
Madras State
1952	Vella Eacharan Iyyani	Indian National Congress
1952	K. Kelappan	Kisan Mazdoor Praja Party
After the Formation of Kerala
1962	E. K. Imbichi Bava	Communist Party of India
1967	C. K. Chakrapani	Communist Party of India (Marxist)
1971	M. K. Krishnan	Communist Party of India (Marxist)
Major boundary changes
1977	G. M. Banatwala	Indian Union Muslim League
1980	G. M. Banatwala	Indian Union Muslim League
1984	G. M. Banatwala	Indian Union Muslim League
1989	G. M. Banatwala	Indian Union Muslim League
1991	Ebrahim Sulaiman Sait	Indian Union Muslim League
1996	G. M. Banatwala	Indian Union Muslim League
1998	G. M. Banatwala	Indian Union Muslim League
1999	G. M. Banatwala	Indian Union Muslim League
2004	E. Ahamed	Indian Union Muslim League
2009	E. T. Mohammed Basheer	Indian Union Muslim League
2014	E. T. Mohammed Basheer	Indian Union Muslim League
2019	E. T. Mohammed Basheer	Indian Union Muslim League
2024	M. P. Abdussamad Samadani	Indian Union Muslim League

== Election results ==
Percentage change (±%) denotes the change in the number of votes from the immediate previous election.

=== General Elections 2029 ===
2029 Indian general election: Ponnani
Party	Candidate	Votes	%	±%
UDF				
LDF				
NDA				
NOTA	None of the above			
Margin of victory				
Turnout				
		Swing		

=== General Election 2024 ===
2024 Indian general election: Ponnani
Party	Candidate	Votes	%	±%
IUML	M. P. Abdussamad Samadani	562,516	54.81	▲3.51
CPI(M)	K.S. Hamza	3,26,756	31.84	▼0.46
BJP	Niveditha Subramanian	1,24,798	12.16	▲1.29
BSP	Vinod	1,477	0.14	N/A
NOTA	None of the above	6,561	0.64	▲0.03
Majority		2,35,760	22.97	▲3.97
Turnout		10,26,616	69.78	
IUML hold		Swing	▲3.51	

By Assembly Segments
No.	Status (Assembly Constituency)	Votes			Lead
No.	Status (Assembly Constituency)	M. P. Abdussamad Samadani	K. S. Hamsa	Niveditha Subramanian	Lead
43	Tirurangadi	92,980	38,833	11,393	54,147
44	Tanur	83,556	41,587	14,861	41,969
45	Tirur	99,468	49,138	12,592	50,330
46	Kottakkal	93,070	47,143	14,406	45,927
47	Thavanur	66,681	48,665	24,204	18,016
48	Ponnani	63,995	48,579	20,115	15,416
49	Thrithala	59,820	50,617	26,162	9,203

=== General Election 2019 ===
There were 13,56,408 registered voters in Ponnani Constituency for the 2019 Lok Sabha Election.

2019 Indian general election: Ponnani
Party	Candidate	Votes	%	±%
IUML	E. T. Mohammed Basheer	521,824	51.30	▲7.87
LDF	P. V. Anvar	3,28,551	32.30	▼8.21
BJP	V. T. Rama	1,10,603	10.87	▲2.24
NOTA	None of the Above	6,231	0.61	▼0.25
Margin of victory		1,93,273	19.00	▲16.08
Turnout		10,17,366	74.98	▲
IUML hold		Swing	▲7.87	

By Assembly Segments
No.	Status (Assembly Constituency)	Votes			Lead
No.	Status (Assembly Constituency)	E. T. Mohammad Basheer	P. V. Anvar	V. T. Rama	Lead
43	Tirurangadi	85,428	38,444	10,663	46,984
44	Tanur	75,210	43,044	14,791	32,166
45	Tirur	90,734	49,349	11,365	41,385
46	Kottakkal	87,795	45,596	13,506	42,199
47	Thavanur	62,481	50,128	20,769	12,353
48	Ponnani	61,294	51,555	17,498	9,739
49	Thrithala	58,496	50,092	21,838	8,404

=== General election 2014 ===
2014 Indian general election: Ponnani
Party	Candidate	Votes	%	±%
IUML	E.T. Mohammed Basheer	378,503	43.43%	−6.71%
LDF	V. Abdurahman	3,53,093	40.51%	+1.11%
BJP	K. Narayanan	75,212	8.63%	+1.13%
SDPI	V.T. Ikramul Haque	26,640	3.06%	N/A
Independent	Abullais T.P.	11,034	1.27%	N/A
AAP	Shylock P.V.	9,504	1.09%	N/A
NOTA	None of the above	7,494	0.86%	−−−
Margin of victory		25,410	2.92%	−7.82%
Turnout		8,71,592	73.83%	
IUML hold		Swing	-6.71%	

By Assembly Segments
No.	Status (Assembly Constituency)	Votes			Lead
No.	Status (Assembly Constituency)	E. T. Mohammad Basheer	V. Abdurahiman	K. Narayanan	Lead
43	Tirurangadi	61,073	37,706	7,530	23,367
44	Tanur	51,365	45,145	10,141	6,220
45	Tirur	63,711	56,466	6,860	7,245
46	Kottakkal	62,791	50,910	8,931	11,881
47	Thavanur	47,039	56,209	13,921	9,170
48	Ponnani	44,942	52,600	12,163	7,658
49	Thrithala	47,488	53,921	15,640	6,433

=== General election 2009 ===
2009 Indian general election: Ponnani
Party	Candidate	Votes	%	±%
IUML	E.T. Mohammed Basheer	3,85,801	50.14%	+1.66%
LDF	Hussain Randathani	3,03,117	39.40%	+4.99%
BJP	K. Janachandran Master	57,710	7.50%	−2.30%
Independent	K. Sadanandan	4,321	0.56%	N/A
Independent	Husain	3,416	0.44%	N/A
Independent	Dr. Azad	2,636	0.34%	N/A
BSP	P.K. Muhammed	2,403	0.31%	N/A
Margin of victory		82,684	10.74%	−3.33%
Turnout		7,69,418		
IUML hold		Swing	+1.66%	

=== General election 2004 ===
2004 Indian general election: Ponnani
Party	Candidate	Votes	%	±%
IUML	E. Ahamed	354,051	48.48%	−5.60%
CPI	P. P. Suneer	2,51,293	34.41%	−0.88%
BJP	Aravindan	71,609	9.80%	+0.16%
Independent	U. Kunhi Muhamed	45,720	6.26%	N/A
Independent	Saleem Veliyancode	7,,666	1.05%	N/A
Margin of victory		1,02,758	14.07%	−4.72%
Turnout		7,30,339		
IUML hold		Swing	-5.60%	

=== General election 1999 ===
1999 Indian general election: Ponnani
Party	Candidate	Votes	%	±%
IUML	G.M. Banatwalla	372,572	54.08%	+3.85%
CPI	P. P. Suneer	2,43,094	35.29%	+0.26%
BJP	K. Narayanan Master	66,427	9.64%	+0.16%
Independent	Kallayi Moosa	3,729	0.54%	N/A
RJD	K. Abdu Rahiman Haji	3,101	0.45%	N/A
Margin of victory		1,29,478	18.79%	+3.59%
Turnout		6,88,923	60.63%	−2.00%
IUML hold		Swing	+3.85%	

=== General election 1998 ===
1998 Indian general election: Ponnani
Party	Candidate	Votes	%	±%
IUML	G.M. Banatwalla	3,44,461	50.23%	+0.60%
CPI	Minu Mumthas	2,40,217	35.03%	−3.51%
BJP	Ahalliya Sankar	65,008	9.48%	+1.61%
Independent	Puthuthottil Ibrahim Tirur	35,026	5.10%	N/A
Independent	Cholakkattil Kunhimuhammed	1,073	0.16%	N/A
Margin of victory		1,04,190	15.20%	+4.11%
Turnout		6,85,785	62.63%	−4.58%
IUML hold		Swing	+0.60%	

=== General election 1996 ===
1996 Indian general election: Ponnani
Party	Candidate	Votes	%	±%
IUML	G.M. Banatwalla	3,54,808	49.63%	−3.45%
CPI	Mokkath Rahmathullah	2,75,513	38.54%	+0.41%
BJP	K. Janachandran Master	56,234	7.87%	+0.78%
Independent	C. K. Abdul Azeez	23,484	3.29%	N/A
Independent	Thorakkattu Konderan	1,737	0.24%	N/A
Independent	Areekadan Kadeesumma Kuttyassan	1,612	0.23%	N/A
Margin of victory		79,295	11.09%	−3.86%
Turnout		7,14,873	67.21%	+3.00%
IUML hold		Swing	-3.45%	

=== General election 1991 ===
1991 Indian general election: Ponnani
Party	Candidate	Votes	%	±%
IUML	Ebrahim Sulaiman Sait	3,39,766	53.08%	−0.61%
CPI	Kattisseri Hamza Kunhu	2,44,060	38.13%	−0.31%
BJP	K. Janachandran Master	45,388	7.09%	+0.15%
Independent	V.P. Radhakrishnan Nair	5,711	0.89%	N/A
Independent	Sreedharan Kalladi Kunnath	2,038	0.32%	N/A
Independent	Ahmed Pokkattil	1,242	0.19%	N/A
Independent	Said Haidros Hibshi Thangal	1,080	0.17%	N/A
Independent	Maliyekkal Hameed	785	0.12%	N/A
Margin of victory		95,706	14.95%	−0.30%
Turnout		6,49,480	64.21%	−7.46%
IUML hold		Swing	-0.61%	

=== General election 1989 ===
1989 Indian general election: Ponnani
Party	Candidate	Votes	%	±%
IUML	G.M. Banatwalla	3,78,347	53.69%	−4.78%
CPI	M. Rahmatullah	2,70,828	38.44%	+0.73%
BJP	K. Janachandran Master	48,892	6.94%	New
JP	Thuppath Mohamedunni	2,622	0.37%	N/A
Independent	Vallikkattil Hyderkutty	1,746	0.25%	N/A
Independent	Velayudhan Nair S	1,171	0.17%	N/A
Independent	Bhaskaran Thekkepurakkal	1,018	0.14%	N/A
Margin of victory		1,07,519	15.25%	−5.51%
Turnout		7,10,929	71.67%	+1.20%
IUML hold		Swing	-4.78%	

=== General election 1984 ===
1984 Indian general election: Ponnani
Party	Candidate	Votes	%	±%
IUML	G.M. Banatwalla	2,88,216	58.47%	+2.94%
CPI	Koladi Govindankutty	1,85,890	37.71%	−5.15%
Independent	K. T. M. Kutty Moulavi	13,290	2.70%	N/A
Independent	M. T. Venu	2,574	0.52%	N/A
Independent	Vattapparambil Kunhali	2,072	0.42%	N/A
Independent	K. Venu	869	0.18%	N/A
Margin of victory		1,02,326	20.76%	+8.09%
Turnout		5,06,049	70.47%	+10.08%
IUML hold		Swing	+2.94%	

=== General election 1980 ===
1980 Indian general election: Ponnani
Party	Candidate	Votes	%	±%
IUML	G.M. Banatwalla	222,834	55.53	▼8.42
LDF	Aryadan Muhammed	1,71,971	42.86	▲6.81
Independent	P. H. Gopala Iyer	6,456	1.61%	N/A
Margin of victory		50,863	12.67%	−15.23%
Turnout		4,05,196	60.39%	−14.80%
IUML hold		Swing	-8.42%	

=== General election 1977 ===
1977 Indian general election: Ponnani
Party	Candidate	Votes	%	±%
IUML	G.M. Banatwalla	269,491	63.95%	
LDF	M. Moideen Kutty Haji	1,51,945	36.05%	
Margin of victory		1,17,546	27.90%	
Turnout		4,31,232	75.19%	
IUML gain from CPI(M)		Swing		

== See also ==
- Malappuram district
- List of Constituencies of the Lok Sabha
- 2019 Indian general election in Kerala
