= Indian Union Muslim League =

- Abbreviation: IUML
- President: K. M. Kader Mohideen
- Chairman: Sayyid Sadiq Ali Shihab Thangal
- General Secretary: P. K. Kunhalikutty
- Rajya Sabha Leader: P. V. Abdul Wahab
- Lok Sabha Leader: E. T. Muhammed Basheer
- Founder: M. Muhammad Ismail
- Founded: 10 March 1948 (First Council); 1 September 1951 (Constitution)
- Preceded by: AIML
- Headquarters: Quaid-e-Millath Manzil, No. 36, Maraikayar Lebbai Street, Chennai, Tamil Nadu, India.
- Student wing: Muslim Students Federation (msf)
- Youth wing: Muslim Youth League (Youth League)
- Women's wing: Muslim Women's League
- Labour wing: Swatantra Thozhilali Union (STU)
- Peasant's wing: Swathanthra Karshaka Sangam (SKS)
- Ideology: Islamic democracy Liberal conservatism
- Political position: Centre-right to right-wing
- ECI status: State Party
- Alliance: UDF (Kerala); SSJVA (Tamil Nadu); INDIA (National)
- Seats in Rajya Sabha: 2 / 245
- Seats in Lok Sabha: 3 / 543
- Seats in State Legislative Assemblies: 24 / 4,036 List 22 / 140 (Kerala) 2 / 234 (Tamil Nadu)
- Number of states and union territories in government: 2 / 31

Election symbol

Party flag

Website
- iumlkerala.org

Indian Union Muslim League (IUML), or simply the Muslim League, is a Muslim political party based in Kerala and Tamil Nadu. It is recognised as a State Party in Kerala by the Election Commission of India.

After the Partition of India, the first Council of the Indian segment of the All-India Muslim League was held on 10 March 1948 at the south Indian city of Madras (now Chennai). The party renamed itself as the 'Indian Union Muslim League' and adopted a new constitution on 1 September 1951.

IUML is a major member of United Democratic Front, the INC-led state level ruling alliance in Kerala. With a strong comeback to power the party shares important cabinet ministries in Keralam government. The party has always had a constant, albeit small, presence in the Indian Parliament. The party is a part of the INDIA in national level. The League first gained a ministry (Minister of State for External Affairs) in Indian Government in 2004.

The party currently has five members in Parliament – E. T. Mohammed Basheer, M. P. Abdussamad Samadani and Kani K. Navas in the Lok Sabha and P. V. Abdul Wahab and Adv. Haris Beeran in the Rajya Sabha – and twenty two members in Kerala State Legislative Assembly.

== History ==
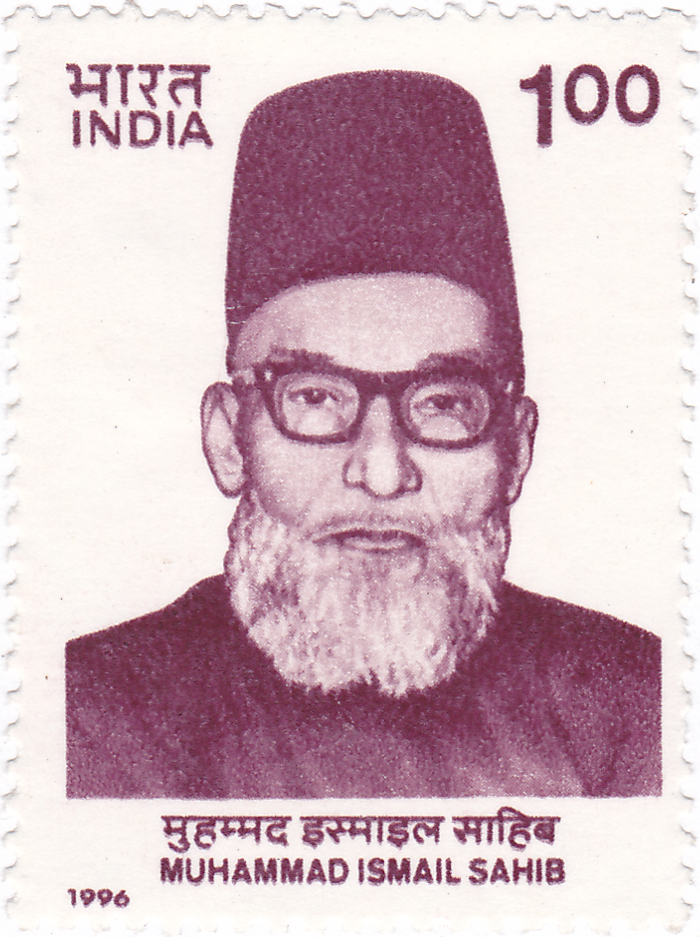
Muhammad Ismail Sahib on a 1996 stamp of India

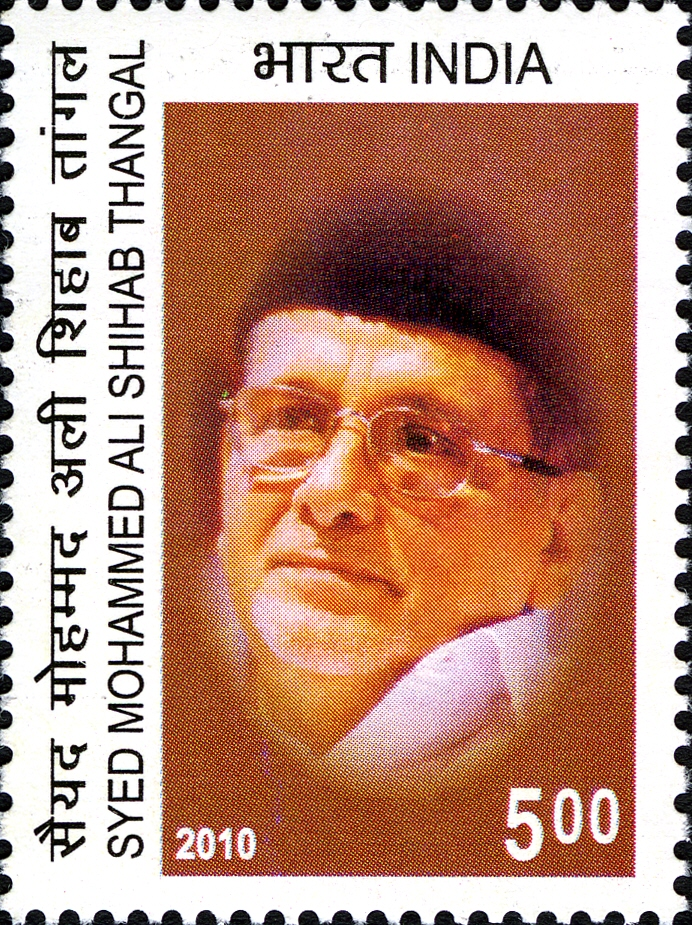
A postage stamp released in commemoration of Mohammed Ali Shihab Thangal (1936–2009).

The first Muslim political agency in the region was the Kerala Muslim Majlis formed in 1931. It joined the federal setup of All-India Muslim League later.

After the partition of India in 1947, the All-India Muslim League was virtually disbanded. It was succeeded by the Indian segment of the Muslim League in the new Dominion of India (first session on 10 March 1948 and constitution passed on 1 September 1951). M. Muhammad Ismail, the then President of the Madras unit of the Muslim League was chosen as the Convener of the Indian segment of the party. The Travancore Muslim League (the States' Muslim League) was merged with the Malabar League in November 1956.

Indian Union Muslim League contests General Elections under the Indian Constitution. The party is normally represented by two members in the Indian Lower House (the Lok Sabha). B. Pocker, elected from Malappuram Constituency, was a member of the First Lower House (1952–57) from the Madras Muslim League. The party currently has four members in Parliament.

Apart from Kerala and West Bengal, the League had Legislative Assembly members in Tamil Nadu, Pondicherry, Maharastra, Karnataka, Uttar Pradesh, and Assam. In West Bengal, the League had won Assembly seats in the 1970s, and A. K. A. Hassanussaman was a member of the Ajoy Mukherjee cabinet.

Indian Union Muslim League first gained a ministry in Kerala Government as part of the Communist Party of India Marxist-led United Front in 1967. The party switched fronts in 1969 and formed an alliance with the Congress in 1976. It later became a chief constituent in a succession of Indian National Congress-led ministries.

=== Early years ===
- First Council of the Indian segment of the Muslim League was held on 10 March 1948 at the south Indian city of Madras (now Chennai).
- On 1 September 1951, the 'Indian Union Muslim League' came into being in Madras (constitution was passed).
- B. Pocker Sahib, elected from Malappuram Constituency, was a member of the first Lok Sabha (1952–57).
- K. M Seethi Sahib served as the Speaker of the Kerala Assembly from 1960 to 1961.

=== From the 1960s to the 80s ===
- The League gained a ministry in Kerala Government in 1967 (C. H. Mohammed Koya and M. P. M. Ahammed Kurikkal).
- The League oversaw the creation of the University of Calicut, the second university in Kerala, in 1968.
- Contribution to local government – the League oversaw the creation of Malappuram District in 1969.
- Death of M. Muhammad Ismail (1972) and Bafaqy Thangal (1973). Syed Ummer Bafaqy Thangal rebels against the leadership.

=== With the Congress Party ===
- Muslim League formed an alliance with the Congress in 1976.
- C. H. Mohammed Koya served as the Chief Minister of Kerala from 12 October to 1 December 1979.
- Muslim League joined the Congress (Indira)-lead United Democratic Front in 1979/80.
- The 'rebel' Muslim League formed 'All India Muslim League' and joined the Left Front in 1980.
- C. H. Mohammed Koya and K. Avukaderkutty Naha served as Deputy Chief Ministers of Kerala in the 1980s.

=== In the 1990s ===
- All India Muslim League (AIML) quit the Left Front and merged with the Muslim League in 1985.
- Demolition of the Babri Masjid (1992). Panakkad Syed Mohammed Ali Shihab Thangal made a passionate plea to all the Muslims in Kerala to remain calm. Kerala remained peaceful throughout.
- Ebrahim Sulaiman Sait, then National President, rebelled and formed the Indian National League (INL) in 1994.
- Minister of Education (E. T. Mohammad Basheer) decided to establish the University of Sanskrit (1993) in Kerala.

=== From the 2000s ===
- Atal Bihari Vajpayee dispatched E. Ahamed to the United Nations (Geneva) to represent India (2004).
- Mid-2000s witnessed the Manjeri (2004) and the Kuttippuram-Mankada (2006) defeats.
- The League first gained a ministry (E. Ahamed) in Indian Government (Manmohan Singh Ministry) in 2004.
- Panakkad Syed Mohammed Ali Shihab Thangal died in 2009.
- The League won a record 20 out of the contested 23 seats in the 2011 Assembly Elections.
- The League remains in the Opposition for two consecutive terms (2016 and 2021)
- The League achieves its best-ever result and moves back into government (2026)

=== National President of Indian Union Muslim League ===
No.	Name	Portrait	Tenure	Home State
1	M. Muhammed Ismail		10 March 1948 — 5 April 1972	Tamil Nadu
2	Bafaqy Thangal		1972 — 19 January 1973	Kerala
3	Ebrahim Sulaiman Sait		1973–1994	Karnataka
4	G. M. Banatwala		1994— 25 June 2008	Maharashtra
5	E. Ahamed		25 June 2008 — 1 February 2017	Kerala
6	K. M. Kader Mohideen		27 February 2017 — present	Tamil Nadu

== Ideology ==
The [Indian Union Muslim League] party...has shown strands of identity politics, but largely remained communitarian; it has at times been conservative, but never communal. It has furthered Muslim aspirations without antagonising any other segment—and hence has retained its centrality in the larger Kerala polity.

— Outlook

The distinctive feature of the [Indian Union] Muslim League in Kerala is that it strove to keep the [Muslim] community at the centre of the [Kerala] state's politics, unlike other Muslim political formations elsewhere in India that revelled in confessional isolationism. As a result, the Kerala Muslims emerged as probably the only community of that faith in India that achieved genuine political empowerment on the one hand and, on the other, lived out the promise of equal citizenship enshrined in the [Indian] Constitution.

— Outlook

If organising a religious community politically on the basis of antagonism to another is communalism, the IUML has never mobilised its cadre nor used its political and often administrative clout to create religious divides. On the contrary, whenever the state faced a communally sensitive situation, the party rose to the occasion and played a stellar role in dousing the flames....By practicing a brand of politics that could be termed communitarian rather than communal, the IUML succeeded in actualising the constitutional guarantee of equal citizenship for the Muslims in the state.

— The Indian Express

== Composition ==
Designation	Name
Chairman- Political Advisory Committee (PAC)	Sadiq Ali Thangal (Kerala)
National President	K. M. Kader Mohideen (Tamil Nadu)
Vice Presidents	Iqbal Ahmed (Uttar Pradesh)
Vice Presidents	Dastagir Ibrahim Aga (Karnataka)
National General Secretary	P. K. Kunhalikutty (Kerala)
National Organising Secretary	E. T. Mohammed Basheer (Kerala)
National Treasurer	P. V. Abdul Wahab (Kerala)
Secretaries	Khorrum Anis Omer (Delhi)
Secretaries	M. P. Abdussamad Samadani (Kerala)
Secretaries	Jayanthi Rajan (Kerala)
Secretaries	S. Naim Akthar (Bihar)
Secretaries	Siraj Ebrahim Sait (Karnataka)
Assistant Secretaries	Abdul Basith (Tamil Nadu)
Assistant Secretaries	Kausar Hayat Khan (Uttar Pradesh)

=== Organizational structure ===
- Youth Wing: Muslim Youth League (the Youth League)
  - National President: Asif Ansari (New Delhi)
  - National Secretary: Najma Thabsheera (Kerala)
  - National Council Secretary: Faisal Babu (Kerala)
  - National vice President Mufeeda Thesni (Kerala)
  - National Secretary: Ch. Ajrudin Advocate (Haryana)
  - Kerala State President: Sayyid Munavvar Ali Shihab Thangal
  - Kerala State secretary: Fathima Thahiliya
  - Kerala State General Secretary: P. K. Firoz
- Students' Wing: Muslim Students Federation (M. S. F.)
  - National President: P.V. Ahamed Saju
  - National General Secretary: S. H. Muhammed Arshad
- Scheduled Caste Wing: Indian Union Dalit League
- Women's Political Wing: Haritha and Muslim Women's League
- Trade Union Organization (Kerala): Swatantra Thozhilali Union (S.T.U)
- Peasants' Union (Kerala): Swathanthra Karshaka Sangam (Independent Peasants Union)
- Advocates: Lawyers Forum
- Expatriates: Kerala Muslim Cultural Centre (K. M. C. C.)

== Kerala Legislative Assembly ==
Source: http://www.ceo.kerala.gov.in/electionhistory.html

=== Early years (1957–1979/80) ===
Election	Seats	Vote%	Government/Opposition	Ministers	Sources
Election	Won (Contested)	Vote%	Government/Opposition	Ministers	Sources
1957	8 (19) As independents	4.72	Opposition (to Namboodiripad Ministry) 1957–59		
1960	11 (12)	5.0 ▲	Government (Pattom Ministry) 1960–62: Formally left the coalition in 1961 as an abstaining Opposition.	Excluded from the Pattom Ministry	
1960	11 (12)	5.0 ▲	Abstaining Opposition (to Shankar Ministry) 1962–64		
1965	6 (16)	3.71 ▼	Inconclusive (no government formed)		
1967	14 (15)	6.75 ▲	Government (Namboodiripad Ministry) 1967–69	C. H. Mohammed Koya; M. P. M. Ahammed Kurikkal (succeeded by K. Avukaderkutty Naha)	
1967	14 (15)	6.75 ▲	Government (Achutha Menon Ministry) 1969–70	C. H. Mohammed Koya; K. Avukaderkutty Naha	
1970	11 (20)	7.7 ▲	Government (Achutha Menon Ministry) 1970–77	C. H. Mohammed Koya (succeeded by Chakkeeri Ahamed Kutty); K. Avukaderkutty Naha	
1977	13 (16)	6.65 ▼	Government (Karunakaran Ministry) 1977	C. H. Mohammed Koya; K. Avukaderkutty Naha	
1977	13 (16)	6.65 ▼	Government (Antony Ministry) 1977–78	C. H. Mohammed Koya (replaced in-between by U. A. Beeran); K. Avukaderkutty Naha	
1977	13 (16)	6.65 ▼	Government (PKV Ministry) 1978–79	C. H. Mohammed Koya; K. Avukaderkutty Naha	
1977	13 (16)	6.65 ▼	Government (Koya Ministry) 1979	C. H. Mohammed Koya	

=== With the United Democratic Front (1979/80–present) ===
Election	Seats	Vote %	Government/Opposition	Ministers
Election	Won (Contested)	Vote %	Government/Opposition	Ministers
1980	14 (21)	7.18 ▲	Opposition (to Nayanar Ministry) 1980–81	
1980	14 (21)	7.18 ▲	Government (Karunakaran Ministry) 1981–82	C. H. Mohammed Koya
1982	14 (18)	6.17 ▼	Government (Karunakaran Ministry) 1982–87	C. H. Mohammed Koya (succeeded by K. Avukaderkutty Naha); U. A. Beeran; E. Ahamed
1987	15 (23)	7.73 ▲	Opposition (to Nayanar Ministry) 1987–91	
1991	19 (22)	7.37 ▼	Government (Karunakaran Ministry) 1991–95	P. K. Kunhalikutty; E. T. Mohammad Basheer; P. K. K .Bava; C.T. Ahammed Ali
1991	19 (22)	7.37 ▼	Government (Antony Ministry) 1995–96	C. T. Ahammed Ali; P. K. K. Bava; P. K. Kunhalikutty; E. T. Mohammad Basheer
1996	13 (23)	7.19 ▼	Opposition (to Nayanar Ministry) 1996–2001	
2001	16 (21)	7.59 ▲	Government (Antony Ministry) 2001–2004	P. K. Kunhalikutty; Nalakath Sooppy; Cherkalam Abdullah; M. K. Muneer
2001	16 (21)	7.59 ▲	Government (Chandy Ministry) 2004–2006	P. K. Kunhalikutty (replaced by V. K. Ebrahim Kunju); E. T. Mohammad Basheer; M. K. Muneer; Kutty Ahammed Kutty
2006	7 (21)	7.30 ▼	Opposition (to Achuthanandan Ministry) 2006–11	
2011	20 (23)	7.92 ▲	Government (Chandy Ministry) 2011–16	P. K. Kunhalikutty; P. K. Abdu Rabb; M. K. Muneer; V. K. Ebrahim Kunju; Manjalamkuzhi Ali
2016	18 (23)	7.40 ▼	Opposition (to Vijayan Ministry) 2016–2021	
2021	15 (25)	8.27 ▲	Opposition (to Vijayan Ministry) 2021—2026	
2026	22 (27)	11.01 ▲	Government (Satheesan Ministry) 2026– Incumbent	P. K. Kunhalikutty (Industries & IT); P. K. Basheer (Public Works); N. Samsudheen (General Education and Minority Welfare); K. M. Shaji (Local Self Government); V. E. Abdul Gafoor (Fisheries and Social Justice)

=== Current members ===
Map of Kerala showing 2021 Assembly Election Results

Legislative Constituency	Member
Kerala
Kasaragod
Manjeshwaram	A. K. M. Ashraf
Kasaragod	N. A. Nellikkunnu
Kozhikode
Koduvally	M. K. Muneer
Malappuram
Kondotty	T. V. Ibrahim
Eranad	P. K. Basheer
Manjeri	U. A. Latheef
Perinthalmanna	Najeeb Kanthapuram
Mankada	Manjalamkuzhi Ali
Malappuram	P. Ubaidulla
Vengara	P. K. Kunhalikutty
Vallikkunnu	P. Abdul Hameed
Tirurangadi	K. P. A. Majeed
Tirur	Kurukkoli Moideen
Kottakkal	K. K. Abid Hussain Thangal
Palakkad
Mannarkkad	N. Samsudheen

== Electoral performance ==
=== Kerala ===
Loksabha election results in Kerala
Election Year	Alliance	Seats contested	Seats won	Total Votes	Percentage of votes	± Vote
2024	UDF	2	2 / 20	1,199,839	6.07%	▲0.59%
2019	UDF	2	2 / 20	1,111,697	5.48%	▲0.94%
2014	UDF	2	2 / 20	816,226	4.54%	▼0.54%
2009	UDF	2	2 / 20	813,741	5.07%	▲0.21%
2004	UDF	2	1 / 20	733,228	4.86%	▼0.44%
1999	UDF	2	2 / 20	810,135	5.30%	▲0.29%
1998	UDF	2	2 / 20	745,070	5.01%	▼0.07%
1996	UDF	2	2 / 20	745,070	5.08%	▲0.06%
1991	UDF	2	2 / 20	715,222	5.02%	▼0.21%
1989	UDF	2	2 / 20	780,322	5.23%	▼0.06%
1984	UDF	2	2 / 20	575,754	5.29%	▼0.27%
1980	UDF	2	2 / 20	454,235	5.60%	▼0.40%
1977	UDF	2	2 / 20	533,726	6.0%	▲0.38%
1971	Steady	2	2 / 19	366,702	5.62%	▼0.98%
1967	Steady	2	2 / 19	413,868	6.6%	▲2.11%
1962	Steady	3	2 / 18	248,038	4.49%	▲2.84%
1957	Steady	1	1 / 18	99,777	1.65%	New

Kerala Legislative Assembly election results
Election Year	Alliance	Seats contested	Seats won	Total Votes	Percentage of votes	± Vote
2026	UDF	26	22 / 140	2,378,053	11.01%	▲2.74%
2021	UDF	25	15 / 140	1,723,593	8.27%	▲0.87%
2016	UDF	23	18 / 140	1,496,864	7.4%	▼0.52%
2011	UDF	23	20 / 140	1,383,670	7.92%	▲0.62%
2006	UDF	21	7 / 140	1,135,098	7.30%	▼0.70%
2001	UDF	23	16 / 140	1,259,572	8.00%	▲0.81%
1996	UDF	22	13 / 140	1,025,556	7.19%	▼0.18%
1991	UDF	22	19 / 140	1,044,582	7.37%	▼0.36%
1987	UDF	23	15 / 140	985,011	7.73%	▲1.56%
1982	UDF	18	14 / 140	590,255	6.17%	▼1.01%
1980	UDF	21	14 / 140	684,910	7.18%	▲0.52%
1977	UDF	16	13 / 140	584,642	6.66%	▼0.90%
1970	Steady	20	11 / 133	569,220	7.56%	▲0.81%
1967	Steady	15	14 / 133	424,159	6.75%	▲2.92%
1965	Steady	16	6 / 133	242,529	3.83%	▼1.13%
1960	Steady	12	11 / 126	401,925	4.96%	New
1957	Steady	19	8 / 126		4.72%	Steady

=== Tamil Nadu ===
Loksabha election results in Tamil Nadu
Election Year	Alliance	Seats contested	Seats won	Total Votes	Percentage of votes	± Vote
2024	INDIA	1	1 / 39	5,09,664	1.17%	▲0.09%
2019	UPA	1	1 / 39	4,69,943	1.08%	▲0.57%
2014	UPA	1	1 / 39	205,896	0.51%	▼0.68%
2009	UPA	2	1 / 39	360,474	1.19%	Steady
2004	UPA	1	0 / 39			
1999	DPPA	1	0 / 39			
1991	PMK+	5	0 / 39			
1989	Congress+	1	1 / 39	356,637		
1984	DPA	1	0 / 39	176,372		
1980	DPA	1	1 / 39	232,567	1.26%	
1977	AIADMK+	1	0 / 39			
1971	DMK+	1	1 / 39	175,940	1.10%	▼0.07
1967	DMK+	1	1 / 39	180,392	1.17%	
1951	Steady	1	1 / 75	79,470	0.40%	New

Tamil Nadu Legislative Assembly election results
Election Year	Alliance	Seats contested	Seats won	Total Votes	Percentage of votes	± Vote
2026	TVK+	2	2 / 234	142,465	0.29%	▼0.19%
2021	DMK+	3	0 / 234	222,263	0.48%	▼0.25%
2016	DMK+	5	1 / 234	313,808	0.73%	▲0.52%
2011	DMK+	3	0 / 234			
2006	DMK+	2	0 / 234			
2001	DMK+	1	0 / 234	30,497	0.1%	
1996	AIADMK+	1	0 / 234			
1989	INC+	5	0 / 234			
1980	DMK-INC(I)+	8	1 / 234			
1977	AIADMK+	1	1 / 234	26,620	0.2%	▼0.24%
1971	DMK+	2	2 / 234	69,634	0.44%	▼0.22%
1967	DMK+	3	3 / 234	95,494	0.62%	▼0.1%
1962	DMK+	6	0 / 206	89,968	0.71%	▼0.22%
1952	Steady	13	5 / 375	1,86,546	0.93%	Steady

== List of Union Ministers ==
No.	Photo	Portfolio	Name (Lifespan)	Assumed office	Left office	Duration	Constituency (House)	Prime Minister	
1		Minister of External Affairs (MoS)	E. Ahamed (1938–2017)	23 May 2004	22 May 2009	4 years, 364 days	Ponnani (Lok Sabha)	Prime Minister	Manmohan Singh
1		Minister of Railways (MoS)	E. Ahamed (1938–2017)	28 May 2009	19 January 2011	1 year, 236 days	Malappuram (Lok Sabha)		Manmohan Singh
1		Minister of External Affairs (MoS)	E. Ahamed (1938–2017)	19 January 2011	26 May 2014	3 years, 127 days	Malappuram (Lok Sabha)		Manmohan Singh
1		Minister of Human Resource Development (MoS)	E. Ahamed (1938–2017)	12 July 2011	28 October 2012	1 year, 108 days	Malappuram (Lok Sabha)		Manmohan Singh

== Members of Parliament ==
=== Lok Sabha Members ===
Source: Loksabha
Election	Lok sabha	Member	Constituency
1951	1st Lok Sabha	B. Pocker	Malappuram
1957	2nd Lok Sabha	B. Pocker	Manjeri
1962	3rd Lok Sabha	C. H. Mohammed Koya	Kozhikode
1962	3rd Lok Sabha	M. Muhammad Ismail	Manjeri
1967	4th Lok Sabha	M. Muhammad Ismail	Manjeri
1967	4th Lok Sabha	Ebrahim Sulaiman Sait	Kozhikode
1967	4th Lok Sabha	S. M. Muhammed Sheriff	Ramananthapuram
1971	5th Lok Sabha	M. Muhammad Ismail	Manjeri
1971	5th Lok Sabha	Ebrahim Sulaiman Sait	Kozhikode
1971	5th Lok Sabha	S. M. Muhammed Sheriff	Periyakulam
1971	5th Lok Sabha	Abu Taleb Chowdhury	Murshidabad
1977	6th Lok Sabha	G. M. Banatwalla	Ponnani
1977	6th Lok Sabha	Ebrahim Sulaiman Sait	Manjeri
1980	7th Lok Sabha	G. M. Banatwalla	Ponnani
1980	7th Lok Sabha	Ebrahim Sulaiman Sait	Manjeri
1980	7th Lok Sabha	A. K. A. Abdul Samad	Vellore
1984	8th Lok Sabha	G. M. Banatwalla	Ponnani
1984	8th Lok Sabha	Ebrahim Sulaiman Sait	Manjeri
1989	9th Lok Sabha	G. M. Banatwalla	Ponnani
1989	9th Lok Sabha	Ebrahim Sulaiman Sait	Manjeri
1989	9th Lok Sabha	A. K. A. Abdul Samad	Vellore
1991	10th Lok Sabha	Ebrahim Sulaiman Sait	Ponnani
1991	10th Lok Sabha	E. Ahamed	Manjeri
1996, 1998, 1999	11, 12, 13th Lok Sabha	G. M. Banatwalla	Ponnani
1996, 1998, 1999	11, 12, 13th Lok Sabha	E. Ahamed	Manjeri
2004	14th Lok Sabha	E. Ahamed	Ponnani
2004	14th Lok Sabha	K.M. Kader Mohideen	Vellore
2009	15th Lok Sabha	E. Ahamed	Malappuram
2009	15th Lok Sabha	E. T. Mohammed Basheer	Ponnani
2009	15th Lok Sabha	Abdul Rahman	Vellore
2014	16th Lok Sabha	E. Ahamed and P. K. Kunhalikutty	Malappuram
2014	16th Lok Sabha	E. T. Mohammed Basheer	Ponnani
2019	17th Lok Sabha	P. K. Kunhalikutty and M. P. Abdussamad Samadani	Malappuram
2019	17th Lok Sabha	E. T. Mohammed Basheer	Ponnani
2019	17th Lok Sabha	K. Navas Kani	Ramananthapuram
2024	18th Lok Sabha	E. T. Mohammed Basheer	Malappuram
2024	18th Lok Sabha	M. P. Abdussamad Samadani	Ponnani
2024	18th Lok Sabha	K. Navas Kani	Ramananthapuram

=== Rajya Sabha Members ===
Source: Rajyasabha
State	Member	Year
Madras	M. Muhammad Ismail	1952–58
Tamil Nadu	A. K. A. Abdul Samad	1964–70
Tamil Nadu	S. A. Khwaja Mohideen	1968–74
Tamil Nadu	A. K. A. Abdul Samad	1970–76
Tamil Nadu	A. K. Refaye	1972–78
Tamil Nadu	S. A. Khwaja Mohideen	1974–80
Kerala	Ebrahim Sulaiman Sait	1960–66
Kerala	Abdulla Koya	1967–73 1974–98
Kerala	Hamid Ali Schamnad	1970–79
Kerala	Abdussamad Samadani	1994–2006
Kerala	Korambayil Ahammed	1998–03
Kerala	P. V. Abdul Wahab	2004–10 2015–present
Kerala	Adv.Haris Beeran	2024–present

== List of State Cabinet Ministers ==
Cabinet Ministers from Indian Union Muslim League in defferent ministries of Kerala
Sl. No.	Name	Designation	Tenure	Cabinet	Chief Minister	Notes
1	P. K. Abdu Rabb	Minister for Education	2011–2016	Second Oommen Chandy ministry	Oommen Chandy	
2	Manjalamkuzhi Ali	Minister for Urban Affairs and Minority Welfare	2012–2016	Second Oommen Chandy ministry	Oommen Chandy	Assumed office on 12 April 2012
3	M. K. Muneer	Minister for Social Welfare and Panchayats	2011–2016	Second Oommen Chandy ministry	Oommen Chandy	
4	V. K. Ebrahimkunju	Minister for Public Works	2011–2016	Second Oommen Chandy ministry	Oommen Chandy	
5	P. K. Kunhalikutty	Minister for Industries, IT, Trade & Commerce, Mining & Geology, Wakf & Haj Affairs	2011–2016	Second Oommen Chandy ministry	Oommen Chandy	# Minister for Industries and Information Technology (with effect from 12 April 2012 ) Hold the portfolio of urban affairs from 18 May 2011 to 12 April 2012
1	Kutty Ahammed Kutty	Minister for Local Self Government	2004–2006	First Oommen Chandy ministry	Oommen Chandy	
2	E. T. Muhammed Basheer	Minister for Education	2004–2006	First Oommen Chandy ministry	Oommen Chandy	
3	P. K. Kunhalikutty	Minister for Industries and Social Welfare	2004–2005	First Oommen Chandy ministry	Oommen Chandy	Assumed office on 31 August 2004 AN and resigned on 4 January 2005
4	M. K. Muneer	Minister for Public Works	2004–2006	First Oommen Chandy ministry	Oommen Chandy	
	V. K. Ebrahimkunju	Minister for Industries and Social Welfare	2005-2006	First Oommen Chandy ministry	Oommen Chandy	Assumed office on 6 January 2005
1	Chekkalam Abdulla	Minister for Local Self Government	2001–2004	Third A. K. Antony ministry	A. K. Antony	
2	Nalakath Soopy	Minister for Education	2001–2004	Third A. K. Antony ministry	A. K. Antony	
3	P. K. Kunhalikutty	Minister for Industries and Social Welfare	2001–2004	Third A. K. Antony ministry	A. K. Antony	Assumed office on 17 May 2001
4	M. K. Muneer	Minister for Public Works	2001–2004	Third A. K. Antony ministry	A. K. Antony	
1	E. T. Muhammed Basheer	Minister for Education	1995–1996	Second A. K. Antony ministry	A. K. Antony	
2	P. K. Kunhalikutty	Minister for Industries and Municipalities	1995–1996	Second A. K. Antony ministry	A. K. Antony	
3	P. K. K. Bava	Minister for Panchayat and Social Welfare	1995–1996	Second A. K. Antony ministry	A. K. Antony	
4	C. T. Ahammed Ali	Minister for Public Works	1995–1996	Second A. K. Antony ministry	A. K. Antony	
1	E. T. Muhammed Basheer	Minister for Education	1991–1995	Fourth K. Karunakaran ministry	K. Karunakaran	
2	P. K. Kunhalikutty	Minister for Industries	1991–1995	Fourth K. Karunakaran ministry	K. Karunakaran	
3	C. T. Ahammed Ali	Minister for Local Administration	1991–1995	Fourth K. Karunakaran ministry	K. Karunakaran	Assumed office on 29 June 1991
4	P.K.K Bava	Minister for Public Works	1991-1995	Fourth K. Karunakaran ministry	K. Karunakaran	Assumed office on 29 June 1991
01	K. Avukaderkutty Naha	Deputy Chief Minister of Kerala	1983–1987	Third K. Karunakaran ministry	K. Karunakaran	Assumed office on 24 October 1983
02	C. H. Mohammed Koya	Deputy Chief Minister of Kerala	1982–1983	Third K. Karunakaran ministry	K. Karunakaran	Expired on 28 September 1983
01	C. H. Mohammed Koya	Deputy Chief Minister of Kerala & Minister for Public Works	1981–1982	Second K. Karunakaran ministry	K. Karunakaran	
01	C. H. Mohammed Koya	Chief Minister of Kerala	Oct 1979 –Dec 1979	Koya ministry	—	The Koya ministry lasted 1 month and 20 days.
01	C. H. Mohammed Koya	Minister for Education	1978–1979	P. K. Vasudevan Nair ministry	P. K. Vasudevan Nair	
02	K. Avukader Kutty Naha	Minister for Local Administration	1978–1979	P. K. Vasudevan Nair ministry	P. K. Vasudevan Nair	Assumed office on 9 December 1978
01	K. Avukader Kutty Naha	Minister for Local Administration	1977-78	First Antony ministry	A. K. Antony	
02	C. H. Mohammed Koya	Minister for Education	1977-78	First Antony ministry	A. K. Antony	Resigned w.e.f. 20 December 1977 and again assumed office on 4 October 1978
	U. A. Beeran	Minister for Education	January 1978 - October 1978	First Antony ministry	A. K. Antony	Assumed office on 27 January 1978 and resigned w. e. f. 3 October 1978
01	C.H. Mohammed Koya	Minister for Education	25 March 1977 - 25 April 1977	First Karunakaran ministry	K. Karunakaran	
2	K. Avukader Kutty Naha	Minister for Local Administration	25 March 1977 - 25 April 1977	First Karunakaran ministry	K. Karunakaran	
01	C. H. Mohammed Koya	Minister for Education and Home	1970–1977	Second C. Achutha Menon ministry	C. Achutha Menon	Resigned w.e.f. 1 March 1973
02	K. Avukader Kutty Naha	Minister for Food and Local Administration	1970–1977	Second C. Achutha Menon ministry	C. Achutha Menon	
03	Chakkeeri Ahamed Kutty	Minister for Education	1973-1977	Second C. Achutha Menon ministry	C. Achutha Menon	Assumed office on 2 March 1973
01	C. H. Mohammed Koya	Minister for Home and Education	1969–1970	First C. Achutha Menon ministry	C. Achutha Menon	
02	K. Avukader Kutty Naha	Minister for Local Administration	1969–1970	First C. Achutha Menon ministry	C. Achutha Menon	
01	K. Avukader Kutty Naha	Minister for Panchayats	1967–1969	E. M. S. Namboodiripad ministry	E. M. S. Namboodiripad	** Assumed office on 9 November 1968 and Resigned w. e. f. 21 October 1969
02	M. P. M. Ahammed Kurikkal	Minister for Panchayats	1967–1969	E. M. S. Namboodiripad ministry	E. M. S. Namboodiripad	** Expired on 24 October 1968
03	C. H. Mohammed Koya	Minister for Education	1967–1969	E. M. S. Namboodiripad ministry	E. M. S. Namboodiripad	** Resigned w.e.f. 21 October 1969

== Controversies ==
=== Women rights ===
In 2013, the party demanded Muslim women to be excluded from the Child Marriage Act which prescribes 18 as women's legal marital age and 21 for men, in Supreme court stating its contradictory to Muslim Personal laws. Similarly in 2021, the party was against the Union Cabinet's suggestion to change the minimum marriage age of women from 18 to 21 years.

The party when in control of the local self-government department, issued a circular which legalised marriage for Muslim women between ages of 16 and 18 and Muslim men below age 21. The circular was later amended after backlash. In 2021, ten female leaders from the disbanded Haritha state committee lodged a police complaint against the state president of the Muslim Students Federation (MSF) and the Malappuram district general secretary, accusing them of making sexual remarks and sexual harassment charges. Following this Fathima Thahiliya, vice-president of MSF, who supported the women leaders was removed from her post.

The Muslim League has opposed the Supreme Court of India verdict regarding entry of adult women to Sabarimala temple.

=== LGBT rights ===
It is also at odds with several LGBTQ rulings from the Supreme Court. The party also supports the primacy of Muslim Personal Law among Indian Muslims.

IUML opposes implementing gender neutrality and comprehensive sex education in school curriculum saying that it promotes homosexuality, leads to sexual anarchy and is part of an atheist-liberal conspiracy to destroy religious values. In 2022, IUML leader Abdurahiman Randathani made statement that the co-educational schools teach homosexuality and masturbation. In 2023, IUML leader K. M. Shaji made controversial statement that the LGBT members are the 'worst humans'. He made similar statement in 2026 too. Similarly in 2023, another IUML leader M.K Muneer made controversial comment on a trans man who gave birth.

=== Conservatism & Violence ===
An article by the current president of the Muslim League, on Hagia Sophia, seemed to support the views of political Islam. Muslim League generally presents itself as a conservative political party in Kerala. The Catholic Church has also criticized the IUML for organizing solidarity programs in support of Hamas, arguing that such actions downplay or obscure the terrorist attacks carried out by the group. A controversy occurred in 2015, when the Islamic symbol of Crescent moon and a star appeared in a Board Exam question paper when IUML's P.K. Abdu Rabb was Kerala's Education minister.The Kerala School Teachers Association (KSTA) alleged that the IUML was exerting influence over the state's education system.

The party leaders were also involved in the Marad massacre, which involved the killing of 8 Hindu fishermen. Eight party workers were also convicted in 2024 for the killing of a DYFI activist.

In July 2023, following the Manipur violence where a woman was paraded naked in public, members of the Muslim League raised anti Hindu slogans in Kanhangad, located in the Kasaragod district of Kerala. The following day, Kerala Police arrested five of those members. Upon criticism over the incident, the State President of IUML Panakkad Sayyid Sadiq Ali Shihab Thangal responded on 28 July, saying no one has the right to hurt the sentiments and faith of others. In 2025, an FIR was filed against IUML leader Basheer Vellikoth for provocative remarks on television on Pahalgam terrorist attack. In 2025, the BJP criticised IUML MP of Navaskani for eating non-veg in the Tiruparankundram temple premises.

=== Casteism ===
In 2021, the IUML leaders made casteism remarks on the Kerala chief minister Pinarayi Vijayan and his daughter's marriage as 'prostitution'. In 2023, the Kerala Women Commission booked cased against IUML leader K. M. Shaji over his comments on minister Veena George in a speech involving alleged casteist remarks. In 2025, case has been filed against IUML workers for using casteism slurs and conducting "purification ritual" after a Scheduled caste man was relieved from a local government body position.

== See also ==
- List of political parties in India
- All-India Muslim League
- Indian Independence Movement
- List of Islamic political parties
