= Ebrahim Sulaiman Sait =

Indian politician

- Ebrahim Sulaiman Sait
- Born: 3 November 1922; Bangalore, British India
- Died: 27 April 2005 (aged 82); Bangalore, Karnataka, India
- Education: Under-Graduation (History and Economics)
- Occupation: Politician
- Spouse: Mariyam Bai
- Parents: Muhammed Sulaiman Sait; Zainab Bai

Ebrahim Sulaiman Sait (1922 – 2005), known as "Mehboob-e-Millat", was an Indian politician, born in Bangalore in a Cutchi Memon family, who served as an Indian Union Muslim League Member of Parliament from northern Kerala several times. He was also a founding member of All India Muslim Personal Law Board.

In 1994, while serving as its National President, Sait severed ties with the Indian Union Muslim League and formed the Indian National League.

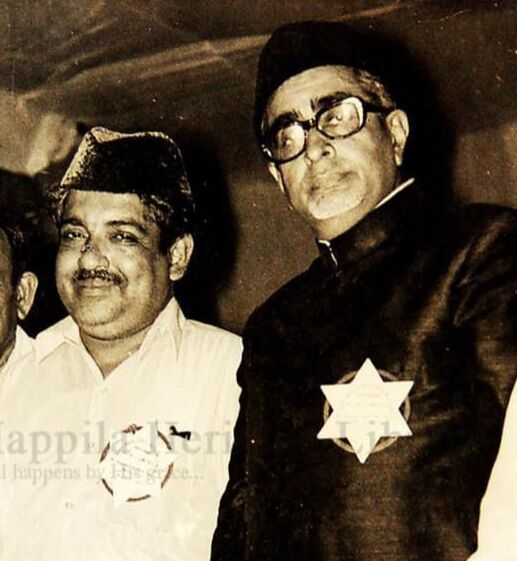
Indian Union Muslim League leaders C. H. Mohammed Koya and Ebrahim Sulaiman Sait (right)

== Early life ==
Sait was born to Mohammed Sulaiman and Zainab Bai on 3 November 1922 at Bangalore. He obtained his Bachelor of Arts under-graduate degree from St. Joseph's College, Bangalore.

He married Mariyam Bai, from Mattancherry, in 1949.

== Member of Parliament ==
Sait served as the National President of Indian Union Muslim League from 1973 to 1994.

=== Lok Sabha ===
Election Year	Vote share (%)	Parliamentary Constituency	Party
1991	53.08	Ponnani	Indian Union Muslim League
1989	49.84	Manjeri	Indian Union Muslim League
1984	50.90	Manjeri	Indian Union Muslim League
1980	53.61	Manjeri	Indian Union Muslim League
1977	61.27	Manjeri	Indian Union Muslim League
1971		Kozhikode	Indian Union Muslim League
1967		Kozhikode	Indian Union Muslim League

=== Rajya Sabha ===
Election Year	Term	Representing State	Party
1960	1960–66	Kerala	Indian Union Muslim League
