= List of current Indian opposition leaders =

Leaders of Official Opposition in state legislatures

The official opposition in India includes the Leader of the Opposition in Rajya Sabha, the Leader of the Opposition in Lok Sabha and the current opposition leaders in the legislative councils and legislative assemblies of the Indian states and union territories. Bhupendra Hooda & Rabri Devi are longest serving. Four incumbents belong to the Bharatiya Janata Party and two to the All India Trinamool Congress and eight to the Indian National Congress. No other party has more than one opposition leader in office. At present seven states's assembly and one state's council is under Vacancy.

== Parliament of India ==
This is the list of current opposition leaders in the Parliament of India:

Portrait	Name	Elected constituency	Term of office			Political party
Portrait	Name	Elected constituency	Assumed office	Left office	Time in office	Political party
Rajya Sabha
	Mallikarjun Kharge	Karnataka	16 February 2021	Incumbent	5 years, 239 days	Indian National Congress
Lok Sabha
	Rahul Gandhi	Rae Bareli	9 June 2024	Incumbent	2 years, 126 days	Indian National Congress

=== State Legislative Assemblies ===
This is the list of current opposition leaders in the legislative assemblies of the Indian states and union territories:

State/UT	Portrait	Name	Political party
Andhra Pradesh	Vacant (no opposition with at least 10% seats)		
Arunachal Pradesh	Vacant (no opposition with at least 10% seats)		
Assam		Wazed Ali Choudhury	Indian National Congress
Bihar		Tejashwi Yadav	Rashtriya Janata Dal
Chhattisgarh		Charan Das Mahant	Indian National Congress
Delhi		Atishi Marlena	Aam Aadmi Party
Goa		Yuri Alemao	Indian National Congress
Gujarat	Vacant (no opposition with at least 10% seats)		
Haryana		Bhupinder Singh Hooda	Indian National Congress
Himachal Pradesh		Jai Ram Thakur	Bharatiya Janata Party
Jammu and Kashmir		Sunil Kumar Sharma	Bharatiya Janata Party
Jharkhand		Babulal Marandi	Bharatiya Janata Party
Karnataka		R. Ashoka	Bharatiya Janata Party
Kerala		Pinarayi Vijayan	Communist Party of India (Marxist)
Madhya Pradesh	No photo	Umang Singhar	Indian National Congress
Maharashtra	Vacant (no opposition with at least 10% seats)		
Manipur	Vacant (no opposition with at least 10% seats)		
Meghalaya		Mukul Sangma	Mamata All India Trinamool Congress
Mizoram	No photo	Lalchhandama Ralte	Mizo National Front
Nagaland	Vacant (no opposition with at least 10% seats)		
Odisha		Naveen Patnaik	Biju Janata Dal
Puducherry	No photo	A. M. H. Nazeem	Dravida Munnetra Kazhagam
Punjab		Partap Singh Bajwa	Indian National Congress
Rajasthan		Tika Ram Jully	Indian National Congress
Sikkim	Vacant (no opposition with at least 10% seats)		
Tamil Nadu		Udhayanidhi Stalin	Dravida Munnetra Kazhagam
Telangana		K. Chandrashekar Rao	Bharat Rashtra Samithi
Tripura		Jitendra Chaudhury	Communist Party of India (Marxist)
Uttarakhand		Yashpal Arya	Indian National Congress
Uttar Pradesh	No photo	Mata Prasad Pandey	Samajwadi Party
West Bengal		Ritabrata Banerjee	Democratic Trinamool Congress

== See also ==
- Governor (India)
- Chief minister (India)
- Chief Whip (India)
- List of current Indian chief justices
- List of current Indian legislative speakers and chairpersons
- List of current Indian ruling and opposition parties
- List of female opposition leaders in India
- Leader of the Opposition (India)
- Leader of the Opposition in Rajya Sabha
- Leader of the Opposition in Lok Sabha
