= List of Left Front candidates in the 2024 Indian general election =

For the 2024 Indian general election, the candidates for the Lok Sabha (lower house of the India parliament) of the Left Front are as follows:

== Seat sharing summary ==
Parties		States/UTs	Alliance	Seats contested		Won		+/-
Communist Party of India (Marxist)	CPI(M)	West Bengal	SDA	23	52	0	4	Steady
Communist Party of India (Marxist)	CPI(M)	Kerala	LDF	15	52	1	4	Steady
Communist Party of India (Marxist)	CPI(M)	Tamil Nadu	SPA	2	52	2	4	Steady
Communist Party of India (Marxist)	CPI(M)	Andaman and Nicobar Islands	-	1	52	0	4	Steady
Communist Party of India (Marxist)	CPI(M)	Andhra Pradesh	INDIA	1	52	0	4	Steady
Communist Party of India (Marxist)	CPI(M)	Assam	-	1	52	0	4	Steady
Communist Party of India (Marxist)	CPI(M)	Bihar	INDIA	1	52	0	4	Steady
Communist Party of India (Marxist)	CPI(M)	Jharkhand	-	1	52	0	4	Steady
Communist Party of India (Marxist)	CPI(M)	Karnataka	-	1	52	0	4	Steady
Communist Party of India (Marxist)	CPI(M)	Odisha	INDIA	1	52	0	4	Steady
Communist Party of India (Marxist)	CPI(M)	Punjab	-	1	52	0	4	Steady
Communist Party of India (Marxist)	CPI(M)	Rajasthan	INDIA	1	52	1	4	▲1
Communist Party of India (Marxist)	CPI(M)	Telangana	-	1	52	0	4	Steady
Communist Party of India (Marxist)	CPI(M)	Tripura	INDIA	1	52	0	4	Steady
Communist Party of India	CPI	Jharkhand	-	4	30	0	2	Steady
Communist Party of India	CPI	Uttar Pradesh	-	6	30	0	2	Steady
Communist Party of India	CPI	Kerala	LDF	4	30	0	2	Steady
Communist Party of India	CPI	Andhra Pradesh	INDIA	1	30	0	2	Steady
Communist Party of India	CPI	Assam		1	30	0	2	Steady
Communist Party of India	CPI	Tamil Nadu	SPA	2	30	2	2	Steady
Communist Party of India	CPI	West Bengal	SDA	2	30	0	2	Steady
Communist Party of India	CPI	Bihar	INDIA	1	30	0	2	Steady
Communist Party of India	CPI	Chhattisgarh	-	1	30	0	2	Steady
Communist Party of India	CPI	Punjab	-	3	30	0	2	Steady
Communist Party of India	CPI	Odisha	INDIA	1	30	0	2	Steady
Communist Party of India	CPI	Maharashtra	-	1	30	0	2	Steady
Communist Party of India (ML)L	CPI(ML)L	Bihar	INDIA	3	4	2	2	▲2
Communist Party of India (ML)L	CPI(ML)L	Jharkhand	INDIA	1	4	0	2	Steady
Revolutionary Socialist Party	RSP	West Bengal	SDA	3	4	0	1	Steady
Revolutionary Socialist Party	RSP	Kerala	UDF	1	4	1	1	Steady
All India Forward Bloc	AIFB	West Bengal	SDA	3	4	0	0	Steady
All India Forward Bloc	AIFB	Madhya Pradesh	INDIA	1	4	0	0	Steady
Total				94		9		▲3

== Total seats contesting ==
#	Party	Seats contesting	Seats won
1	CPI(M)	51+	4
2	CPI	30	2
3	CPI(ML)L (in some states)	04	2
Total		89	8

== Statewise candidate list ==
=== Andaman and Nicobar Islands (1 out of 1) ===
#	Constituency	Poll on	Candidate	Party	Result
1	Andaman and Nicobar Islands	19 April 2024	D. Ayappan	CPI(M)	Lost

Source :

=== Andhra Pradesh (2 out of 25) ===
#	Constituency	Poll on	Candidate	Party	Result
1	Araku	13 May 2024	Appala Narsa	CPI(M)	Lost
13	Guntur	13 May 2024	Jangala Ajay Kumar	CPI	Lost

Source: CPI(M) on Twitter

=== Assam (2 out of 14) ===
#	Constituency	Poll on	Candidate	Party	Result
3	Barpeta	7 May 2024	Manoranjan Talukdar	CPI(M)	Lost
12	Lakhimpur	19 April 2024	Deben Kachari	CPI	Lost

Source: CPI(M) on Twitter

=== Bihar (5 out of 40) ===
#	Constituency	Poll on	Candidate	Party	Alliance	Result
24	Begusarai	13 May 2024	Awadhesh Rai	CPI	I.N.D.I.A.	Lost
25	Khagaria	7 May 2024	Sanjay Kushwaha	CPI(M)	I.N.D.I.A.	Lost
28	Nalanda	1 June 2024	Sandeep Saurav	CPI(ML)L	I.N.D.I.A.	Lost
32	Arrah	1 June 2024	Sudama Prasad	CPI(ML)L	I.N.D.I.A.	Won
35	Karakat	1 June 2024	Raja Ram Singh Kushwaha	CPI(ML)L	I.N.D.I.A.	Won

Source : CPI on Twitter CPI(M) on Twitter CPI(ML) on Twitter

=== Chhattisgarh (1 out of 11) ===
#	Constituency	Poll on	Candidate	Party	Result
10	Bastar (ST)	19 April 2024	Phool Singh Kachlam	CPI	Lost

=== Jharkhand (6 out of 14) ===
#	Constituency	Poll on	Candidate	Party	Result
1	Rajmahal (ST)	1 June 2024	Gopen Soren	CPI(M)	Lost
2	Dumka (ST)	1 June 2024	Rajesh Kumar	CPI	Lost
4	Chatra	20 May 2024	Arjun Kumar	CPI	Lost
5	Kodarma	20 May 2024	Vinod Kumar Singh	CPI(ML)L	Lost
12	Lohardaga (ST)	13 May 2024	Mahendra Urav	CPI	Lost
14	Hazaribagh	20 May 2024	Aniruddh Kumar	CPI	Lost

Source: CPI(M) on Twitter CPI(ML) on Twitter

=== Karnataka (1 out of 28) ===
#	Constituency	Polling date	Candidate	Party	Alliance	Result
27	Chikballapur	26 April 2024	M P Munivenkatappa	CPI(M)	Left Front	Lost

Source: CPI(M) on Twitter

=== Kerala (20 out of 20) ===
#	Constituency	Polling date	Candidate	Party	Alliance	Result
1	Kasaragod	26 April 2024	M. V. Balakrishnan	CPI(M)	Left Democratic Front	Lost
2	Kannur	26 April 2024	M. V. Jayarajan	CPI(M)	Left Democratic Front	Lost
3	Vatakara	26 April 2024	K. K. Shailaja	CPI(M)	Left Democratic Front	Lost
4	Wayanad	26 April 2024	Annie Raja	CPI	Left Democratic Front	Lost
5	Kozhikode	26 April 2024	Elamaram Kareem	CPI(M)	Left Democratic Front	Lost
6	Malappuram	26 April 2024	V. Vaseef	CPI(M)	Left Democratic Front	Lost
7	Ponnani	26 April 2024	K. S. Hamza	CPI(M)	Left Democratic Front	Lost
8	Palakkad	26 April 2024	A. Vijayaraghavan	CPI(M)	Left Democratic Front	Lost
9	Alathur (SC)	26 April 2024	K. Radhakrishnan	CPI(M)	Left Democratic Front	Won
10	Thrissur	26 April 2024	V. S. Sunil Kumar	CPI	Left Democratic Front	Lost
11	Chalakudy	26 April 2024	C. Raveendranath	CPI(M)	Left Democratic Front	Lost
12	Ernakulam	26 April 2024	K. J. Shine	CPI(M)	Left Democratic Front	Lost
13	Idukki	26 April 2024	Joice George	CPI(M)	Left Democratic Front	Lost
14	Kottayam	26 April 2024	Thomas Chazhikadan	KC(M)	Left Democratic Front	Lost
15	Alappuzha	26 April 2024	A. M. Ariff	CPI(M)	Left Democratic Front	Lost
16	Mavelikara (SC)	26 April 2024	C. A. Arun Kumar	CPI	Left Democratic Front	Lost
17	Pathanamthitta	26 April 2024	Thomas Issac	CPI(M)	Left Democratic Front	Lost
18	Kollam	26 April 2024	Mukesh Madhavan	CPI(M)	Left Democratic Front	Lost
19	Attingal	26 April 2024	V. Joy	CPI(M)	Left Democratic Front	Lost
20	Thiruvananthapuram	26 April 2024	Pannyan Raveendran	CPI	Left Democratic Front	Lost

Source: CPI(M) on Twitter and CPI on Twitter

=== Maharashtra (2 out of 48) ===
#	Constituency	Polling date	Candidate	Party	Result
15	Hingoli	26 April 2024	Vijay Ramji Gabhane	CPI(M)	Lost
17	Parbhani	26 April 2024	Rajan Kshirsagar	CPI	Lost

Source: CPI on Twitter

=== Odisha (3 out of 21) ===
#	Constituency	Polling date	Candidate	Party	Alliance	Result
16	Jagatsinghpur (SC)	1 June 2024	Ramesh Chandra Sethy	CPI	I.N.D.I.A.	Lost
18	Bhubaneswar	25 May 2024	Suresh Chandra Panigrahy	CPI(M)	I.N.D.I.A.	Lost
21	Koraput		Prakash Hikaka	CPI(M)(ML)		

=== Punjab (4 out of 13) ===
#	Constituency	Polling date	Candidate	Party	Alliance	Result
2	Amritsar	1 June 2024	Daswinder Kaur	CPI	Left Front	Lost
3	Khadoor Sahib	1 June 2024	Gurdial Singh	CPI	Left Front	Lost
4	Jalandhar (SC)	1 June 2024	Purshottam Lal Bilga	CPI(M)	Left Front	Lost
9	Faridkot	1 June 2024	Gurcharan Singh Mann	CPI	Left Front	Lost

=== Rajasthan (1 out of 25) ===
#	Constituency	Polling date	Candidate	Party	Alliance	Result
5	Sikar	19 April 2024	Amra Ram	CPI(M)	I.N.D.I.A.	Won

=== Tamil Nadu (4 out of 39) ===
#	Constituency	Polling date	Candidate	Party	Alliance	Result
18	Tiruppur	19 April 2024	K. Subbarayan	CPI	I.N.D.I.A.	Won
22	Dindigul	19 April 2024	R. Sachithanantham	CPI(M)	I.N.D.I.A.	Won
29	Nagapattinam	19 April 2024	V Selvaraj	CPI	I.N.D.I.A.	Won
32	Madurai	19 April 2024	S. Venkatesan	CPI(M)	I.N.D.I.A.	Won

=== Telangana (2 out of 17) ===
#	Constituency	Polling date	Candidate	Party	Result
14	Bhongir	13 May 2024	Mahamd Jahangir	CPI(M)	Lost

Source: CPI(M) on Twitter

=== Tripura (1 out of 2) ===
#	Constituency	Polling date	Candidate	Party	Alliance	Result
1	Tripura East (ST)	26 April 2024	Rajendra Reang	CPI(M)	I.N.D.I.A.	Lost

Source: CPI(M) on Twitter

=== Uttar Pradesh (6 out of 80) ===
#	Constituency	Polling date	Candidate	Party	Result
29	Dhaurahra	13 May 2024	Janardan Prasad	CPI	Lost
48	Banda	20 May 2024	Ramchandra Saras	CPI	Lost
54	Faizabad	20 May 2024	Arvind Sen	CPI	Lost
68	Lalganj	25 May 2024	Gangadeen	CPI	Lost
70	Ghosi	1 June 2024	Vinod Kumar Rai	CPI	Lost
80	Robertsganj	1 June 2024	Ashok Kumar Kannaujiya	CPI	Lost

=== West Bengal (31 out of 42) ===
#	Constituency	Polling date	Candidate	Party	Alliance	Result
1	Cooch Behar (SC)	19 April 2024	Nitish Chandra Roy	AIFB	Secular Democratic Alliance	Lost
2	Alipurduars (ST)	19 April 2024	Mili Oraon	RSP	Secular Democratic Alliance	Lost
3	Jalpaiguri (SC)	19 April 2024	Debraj Burman	CPI(M)	Secular Democratic Alliance	Lost
6	Balurghat	26 April 2024	Jaydeb Siddhanta	RSP	Secular Democratic Alliance	Lost
11	Murshidabad	7 May 2024	Mohammad Salim	CPI(M)	Secular Democratic Alliance	Lost
12	Krishnanagar	13 May 2024	S. M. Saadi	CPI(M)	Secular Democratic Alliance	Lost
13	Ranaghat (SC)	13 May 2024	Alakesh Das	CPI(M)	Secular Democratic Alliance	Lost
15	Barrackpur	20 May 2024	Debdut Ghosh	CPI(M)	Secular Democratic Alliance	Lost
16	Dum Dum	1 June 2024	Sujan Chakraborty	CPI(M)	Secular Democratic Alliance	Lost
17	Barasat	1 June 2024	Sanjib Chatterjee	AIFB	Secular Democratic Alliance	Lost
18	Basirhat	1 June 2024	Nirapada Sardar	CPI(M)	Secular Democratic Alliance	Lost
19	Jaynagar (SC)	1 June 2024	Samarendra Nath Mandal	RSP	Secular Democratic Alliance	Lost
20	Mathurapur (SC)	1 June 2024	Sarat Chandra Haldar	CPI(M)	Secular Democratic Alliance	Lost
21	Diamond Harbour	1 June 2024	Pratikur Rahaman	CPI(M)	Secular Democratic Alliance	Lost
22	Jadavpur	1 June 2024	Srijan Bhattacharyya	CPI(M)	Secular Democratic Alliance	Lost
23	Kolkata Dakshin	1 June 2024	Saira Shah Halim	CPI(M)	Secular Democratic Alliance	Lost
25	Howrah	20 May 2024	Sabyasachi Chatterjee	CPI(M)	Secular Democratic Alliance	Lost
27	Sreerampur	20 May 2024	Dipsita Dhar	CPI(M)	Secular Democratic Alliance	Lost
28	Hooghly	20 May 2024	Monodip Ghosh	CPI(M)	Secular Democratic Alliance	Lost
29	Arambagh (SC)	20 May 2024	Biplab Kumar Moitra	CPI(M)	Secular Democratic Alliance	Lost
30	Tamluk	25 May 2024	Sayan Banerjee	CPI(M)	Secular Democratic Alliance	Lost
32	Ghatal	25 May 2024	Tapan Ganguly	CPI	Secular Democratic Alliance	Lost
33	Jhargram (ST)	25 May 2024	Sonamoni Murmu (Tudu)	CPI(M)	Secular Democratic Alliance	Lost
34	Medinipur	25 May 2024	Biplab Bhatta	CPI	Secular Democratic Alliance	Lost
36	Bankura	25 May 2024	Nilanjan Dasgupta	CPI(M)	Secular Democratic Alliance	Lost
37	Bishnupur (SC)	25 May 2024	Shital Kaibartya	CPI(M)	Secular Democratic Alliance	Lost
38	Bardhaman Purba (SC)	13 May 2024	Nirav Khan	CPI(M)	Secular Democratic Alliance	Lost
39	Bardhaman-Durgapur	13 May 2024	Dr. Sukriti Ghosal	CPI(M)	Secular Democratic Alliance	Lost
40	Asansol	13 May 2024	Jahanara Khan	CPI(M)	Secular Democratic Alliance	Lost
41	Bolpur (SC)	13 May 2024	Shyamali Pradhan	CPI(M)	Secular Democratic Alliance	Lost

Source: First list, Second list, Third list and Fourth List

== See also ==
List of Left Democratic Front candidates in the 2014 Indian general election
List of West Bengal Left Front candidates in the 2014 Indian general election
List of Left Front candidates in the 2019 Indian general election
List of Left Front candidates in the 2024 Indian general election

- List of Left Democratic Front candidates in the 2024 Indian general election
- List of National Democratic Alliance candidates in the 2024 Indian general election
- List of Indian National Developmental Inclusive Alliance candidates for the 2024 Indian general election
- Communist Party of India (Marxist) campaign for the 2024 Indian general election
