= Communist Party of India (Marxist) campaign for the 2024 Indian general election =

CPI(M) is the largest communist party in India in terms of membership and electoral seats and one of the national parties of India. They are a member of the Indian National Developmental Inclusive Alliance.

== Campaigning ==
=== Andhra Pradesh ===
On 14 April 2023, CPI(M) along with CPI started a campaign named Pracha Bheri against the Central government's policies.

=== Bihar ===
The CPI(M) Bihar state committee organised a massive state-wide campaign at Gandhi Maidan in Patna as part of nationwide campaign during 14 September to 22 September 2022 against the incumbent central government. CPIM took part in an "oust-Modi campaign" starting from Purnia on 25 February 2023 as a part of Mahagathbandhan in Bihar.

=== Kerala ===
The Kerala unit of CPI(M) started 21 day-long campaign from 1 January 2023. On 13 January 2023, CPIM Kerala unit announced state-wide march led by Polit Bureau member and state secretary M. V. Govindan against the central government. The Kerala CPIM has also announced a series of agitations against the NDA government at the centre starting from 20 January 2023. CPIM has planned to launch a state-wide campaign in March to highlight the centre's neglect of Kerala and its trespasses on federalism and secularism. On 20 February 2023, Pinarayi Vijayan inaugurated statewide Janakeeya Prathirodha Jatha (People's Resistance Yatra) led by M. V. Govindan to expose the attacks on federalism and threats posed by the RSS-backed BJP government to the constitutional values of the nation. The rally, that covered 140 constituencies, concluded with a public meeting on 18 March 2023 in Thiruvananthapuram which was inaugurated by Sitaram Yechury.

The LDF government in Kerala will celebrate its second year of administration by launching a Lok Sabha election campaign across the state. People's rally will be organised in all constituencies from 25 April to 20 May 2023.

=== Telangana ===
CPI(M) Telangana State committee will organise state-wide march named Jana Chaitanya Yatra starting from 17 March 2023 in order to protest against the pro-corporate and anti-people policies of the BJP led union government. CPI(M) General Secretary Sitaram Yechury at Warangal, Polit Bureau member B.V. Raghavulu at Adilabad and another Polit Bureau member A. Vijayaraghavan at Nizamabad flagged off the rallies.

=== West Bengal ===
CPI(M) West Bengal State committee has launched mass contact programmes and conducted an extended meeting of state committee members and has resolved to take their "peoples connect" initiative to grassroots levels throughout the state.

=== Tamil Nadu ===
On 6 April 2024, CPIM Tamil Nadu Secretary K. Balakrishnan released party manifesto in the state.

== Seats and Alliances ==
Sl. No.	State	No. of contesting seats	Alliance	Result	
Sl. No.	State	No. of contesting seats	Alliance	Won	Lost
01	A&N Islands	1	LF	0	1
02	Andhra Pradesh	1	LF	0	1
03	Assam	1	LF	0	1
04	Bihar	1	INDIA	0	1
05	Jharkhand	1	LF	0	1
06	Karnataka	1	LF	0	1
07	Kerala	15	LF	1	14
08	Odisha	1	LF	0	1
09	Punjab	1	LF	0	1
10	Rajasthan	1	INDIA	1	0
11	Tamil Nadu	2	INDIA	2	0
12	Telangana	1	LF	0	1
13	Tripura	1	INDIA	0	1
14	West Bengal	23	LF + INC	0	23
Total		52		4	48

== Candidates ==
=== Andaman & Nicobar Islands ===
Constituency No.	Constituency	Reserved for (SC/ST/None)	Candidate	Result
1	A&N Islands	None	D Ayyappan	Lost

=== Andhra Pradesh ===
Constituency No.	Constituency	Reserved for (SC/ST/None)	Candidate	Result
1	Araku	ST	Appala Narsa	Lost

=== Assam ===
Constituency No.	Constituency	Reserved for (SC/ST/None)	Candidate	Result
3	Barpeta	None	Manoranjan Talukdar	Lost

=== Bihar ===
Constituency No.	Constituency	Reserved for (SC/ST/None)	Candidate	Result
25	Khagaria	None	Sanjay Kumar Kushwaha	Lost

=== Jharkhand ===
Constituency No.	Constituency	Reserved for (SC/ST/None)	Candidate	Result
1	Rajmahal	ST	Gopen Soren	Lost

=== Karnataka ===
Constituency No.	Constituency	Reserved for (SC/ST/None)	Candidate	Result
27	Chikkaballapur	None	M P Munivenkatappa	Lost

=== Kerala ===
Constituency No.	Constituency	Reserved for (SC/ST/None)	Candidate	Result
1	Kasaragod	None	M. V. Balakrishnan	Lost
2	Kannur	None	M. V. Jayarajan	Lost
3	Vatakara	None	K. K. Shailaja	Lost
4	Kozhikode	None	Elamaram Kareem	Lost
5	Malappuram	None	V Vaseef	Lost
6	Ponnani	None	K.S. Hamza	Lost
7	Palakkad	None	A. Vijayaraghavan	Lost
8	Alathur	SC	K. Radhakrishnan	Won
9	Chalakudy	None	C. Raveendranath	Lost
10	Ernakulam	None	K. J. Shine	Lost
11	Idukki	None	Joice George	Lost
12	Alappuzha	None	A. M. Ariff	Lost
13	Pathanamthitta	None	Thomas Issac	Lost
14	Kollam	None	M. Mukesh	Lost
15	Attingal	None	V. Joy	Lost

=== Maharastra ===
Constituency No.	Constituency	Reserved for (SC/ST/None)	Candidate	Result
4	Hingoli	SC	Vijay Gabhane	Lost

=== Punjab ===
Constituency No.	Constituency	Reserved for (SC/ST/None)	Candidate	Result
4	Jalandhar	SC	Purushottam Lal Bilga	Lost

=== Rajasthan ===
Constituency No.	Constituency	Reserved for (SC/ST/None)	Candidate	Result
5	Sikar	None	Amra Ram	Won

=== Tamil Nadu ===
In Tamil Nadu, CPIM is part of INDIA headed by Dravida Munnetra Kazhagam.

Constituency No.	Constituency	Reserved for (SC/ST/None)	Candidate	Result
22	Dindigul	None	R. Sachidanandam	Won
32	Madurai	None	Su Venkatesan	Won

=== Telangana ===
Constituency No.	Constituency	Reserved for (SC/ST/None)	Candidate	Result
14	Bhuvanagiri	None	Jahangir	Lost

=== Tripura ===
Constituency No.	Constituency	Reserved for (SC/ST/None)	Candidate	Result
3	East Tripura	ST	Rajendra Reang	Lost

=== West Bengal ===
Constituency No.	Constituency	Reserved for (SC/ST/None)	Candidate	Result
3	Jalpaiguri	SC	Debraj Burman	Lost
11	Murshidabad	None	S M Sadi	Lost
12	Krishnanagar	None	S M Saadi	Lost
13	Ranaghat	SC	Alokesh Das	Lost
16	Dum Dum	None	Sujan Chakrabarty	Lost
22	Jadavpur	None	Srijan Bhattacharyya	Lost
23	Kolkata Dakshin	None	Saira Shah Halim	Lost
25	Howrah	None	Sabyasachi Chatterjee	Lost
27	Serampore	None	Dipsita Dhar	Lost
28	Hooghly	None	Manadip Ghosh	Lost
30	Tamluk	None	Sayan Banerjee	Lost
36	Bankura	None	Nilanjan Dasgupta	Lost
37	Bishnupur	SC	Shital Kebarta	Lost
38	Bardhaman Purba	SC	Nirav Kha	Lost
39	Bardhaman-Durgapur	None	Sukriti Ghosal	Lost
40	Asansol	None	Jahanara Khan	Lost
41	Bolpur	SC	Shyamali Pradhan	Lost

=== Odisha ===
Constituency No.	Constituency	Reserved for (SC/ST/None)	Candidate	Result
4	Bhubaneswar	SC	Suresh Chandra Panigrahi	Lost

== See also ==
- List of Left Front candidates in the 2024 Indian general election
- 2024 Indian general election
- Communist Party of India
