= Wayanad Muslim Orphanage =

Orphanage in Wayanad, Kerala, India

Wayanad Muslim Orphanage - WMO
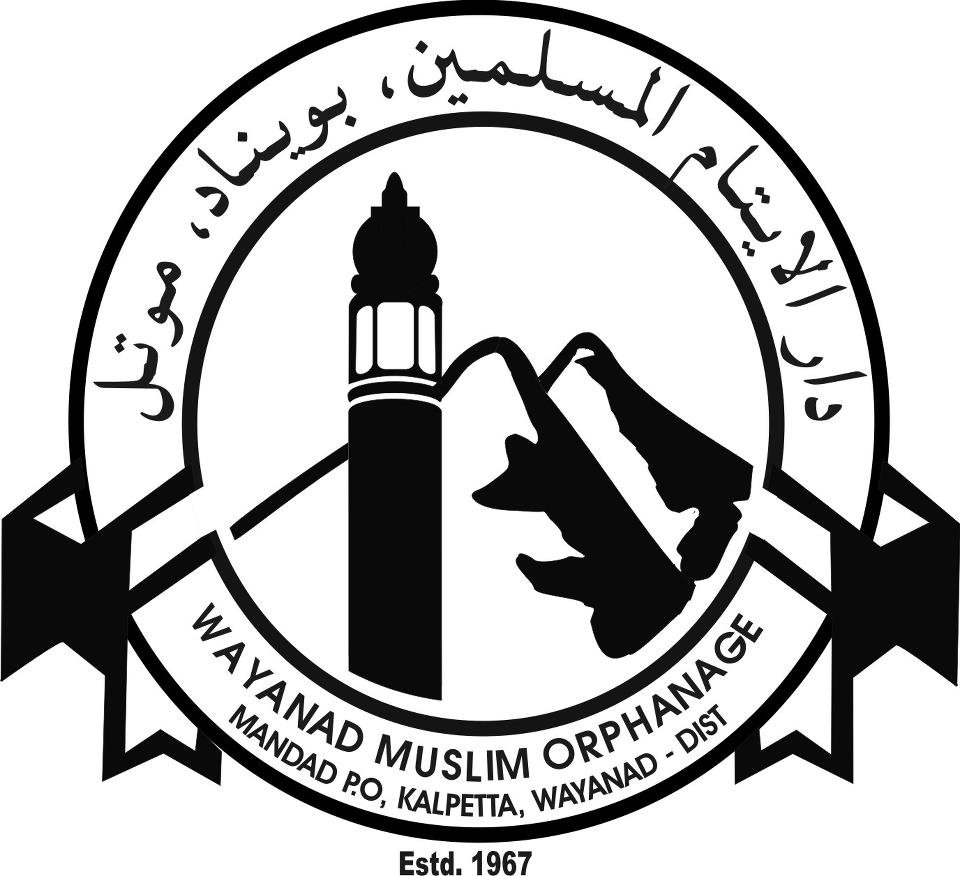
- Motto: Respect the child as a person
- Type: Orphanage
- Established: 1967
- Founders: Marhoom K.P Haji, Neelikkandy Kunji Pokker Haji
- President: K K Ahammed Hajiu
- Head: MA Mohammed Jamal
- Students: 6000
- Location: Kuttamangalam, Mandad (PO), Kalpetta, Wayanad-673122, Kerala, India, Kalpetta, Kerala, India
- Nickname: WMO Muttil
- Website: www.wmomuttil.org
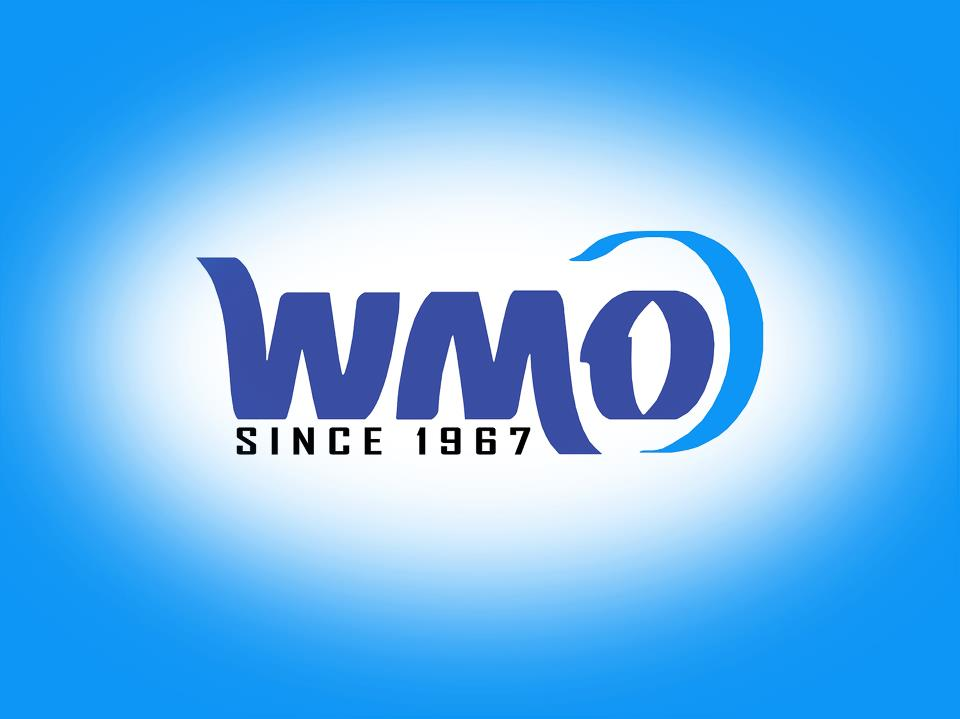

Wayanad Muslim Orphanage (WMO) is a charitable institution based in Wayanad district, Kerala, India. The orphanage is located in Muttil village near Wayanad district headquarters Kalpetta. It runs about 20 educational institutions apart from the charity outfits and small scale industrial firms. It includes a school, a college, foster home, crèche, an academy for Islamic studies, and a special school for visually or hearing impaired pupils.

WMO was established in 1967 under the leadership of Syed Abdul Rahman Bafaqi with a few children as a branch of the Mukkam Muslim Orphanage. As of 2007 the organization provides food, clothes, shelter and protection to nearly 1,100 orphans and destitutes. In an article regarding its 40th anniversary in 2007, The Hindu wrote that the orphanage has played a vital role in improving the social and economic status of the Muslim community as well as society as a whole within Wayanad district. It has criticized the dowry system that apparently prevails in the society and has organized several sans dowry wedding fetes in connection to that. This institution is managed and looked after by General Secretary M.A Mohammed Jamal for over decades. The current vice-president is Mayan Manima and Muhammed sha Master.Treasurer is P P Abdul Kader.

== Educational institutions ==
- WMO Arts and Science College, Muttil
- WMO LP and UP school, Kuttamangalam, Muttil
- WMO HSS, Kuttamangalam, Muttil
- Imam Gazali Academy, Koolivayal
- Darul Uloom Arabic College, Sulthan Bathery
- Allana I.T.C, Meenangadi
- Sharifa Fathima Quran Centre, Kunhome
- T.K.M Girl's Orphanage, Panthippoyil
- WMO Dars, Muttil
- Hayathul Islam Secondary Madrassa, Muttil
- WMO English Academy, Muttil
- WMO English Academy, Sulthan Bathery
- WMO English Academy, Vellamunda
- VHSS, Muttil
- WOHSS, Pinangode
- WMO Special School, Muttil
- Green Mount School, Padinjarathara
- L.P & U.P. School, Muttil
- Pre-primary School, Muttil
- L.P. School, Paralikkunnu
- Tailoring Institute, Muttil
- Kinder Garden, Chamaraj Nagar, Karnataka(On Progress)
- IGASC Kappunchal
- Boys Habitat, Kellur

== Commercial enterprises ==
- OTIPS Rice & Flour Mill, Muttil
- OTIPS Wood Industries, Varyad
- Qatar Offset Press, Muttil
- Qatar Bakery, Varyad
- Dairy Farm, Muttil
- Shopping Complex, Kalpetta
- Otips Stall, kuttamangalam, Muttil(On Progress)

== Other initiatives ==
- Jamia Mosque, Muttil
- WMO Bafaqi Home, Mananthavadi
- Kuwait Clinic
- Al Nasim Women's Hostel, Munderi
- Crèche Unit
