= List of Left Democratic Front candidates in the 2014 Indian general election =

For the 2014 Indian general election, the candidates for the Lok Sabha (lower house of the India parliament) of the Left Democratic Fronts of Kerala were as follows:

Constituency No.	Constituency	Reserved	Candidate	Party	Result
1	Kasaragod	None	P. Karunakaran	Communist Party of India (Marxist)	Won
2	Kannur	None	P. K. Sreemathy	Communist Party of India (Marxist)	Won
3	Vatakara	None	A. N. Shamseer	Communist Party of India (Marxist)	Lost
4	Wayanad	None	Sathyan Mokeri	Communist Party of India	Lost
5	Kozhikode	None	A. Vijayaraghavan	Communist Party of India (Marxist)	Lost
6	Malappuram	None	P. K. Sainaba	Communist Party of India (Marxist)	Lost
7	Ponnani	None	V. Abdurahiman	Communist Party of India (Marxist)	Lost
8	Palakkad	None	M. B. Rajesh	Communist Party of India (Marxist)	Won
9	Alathur	SC	P. K. Biju	Communist Party of India (Marxist)	Won
10	Thrissur	None	C. N. Jayadevan	Communist Party of India	Won
11	Chalakudy	None	Innocent	Independent	Won
12	Ernakulam	None	Christy Fernandez	Independent	Lost
13	Idukki	None	Joice George	Independent	Won
14	Kottayam	None	Mathew T. Thomas	Janata Dal (Secular)	Lost
15	Alappuzha	None	C. B. Chandrababu	Communist Party of India (Marxist)	Lost
16	Mavelikara	SC	Chengara Surendran	Communist Party of India	Lost
17	Pathanamthitta	None	Peelipose Thomas	Communist Party of India (Marxist)	Lost
18	Kollam	None	M. A. Baby	Communist Party of India (Marxist)	Lost
19	Attingal	None	A. Sampath	Communist Party of India (Marxist)	Won
20	Thiruvananthapuram	None	Bennet P. Abraham	Communist Party of India	Lost

== See also ==
List of Left Democratic Front candidates in the 2014 Indian general election
List of West Bengal Left Front candidates in the 2014 Indian general election
List of Left Front candidates in the 2019 Indian general election
List of Left Front candidates in the 2024 Indian general election

- List of West Bengal Left Front candidates in the 2014 Indian general election
- List of National Democratic Alliance candidates in the 2014 Indian general election
- List of United Progressive Alliance candidates in the 2014 Indian general election
- List of United Democratic Front candidates in the 2014 Indian general election
