= List of Left Front candidates in the 2019 Indian general election =

For the 2019 Indian general election, the candidates for the Lok Sabha (lower house of the India parliament) of the Left Front are as follows:

== Seat sharing summary ==
Constituents of Left Front (Pre-poll Alliance)
#	Party	Seats contested	Total Votes	Seats Won	% of votes
1	Communist Party of India (Marxist)	69	10,744,809	3	1.75%
2	Communist Party of India	49	3,576,184	2	0.58%
3	All India Forward Bloc (in some states)	36	323,951	0	0.05%
4	Socialist Unity Centre of India (Communist) (in 20 states & 3 UTs)	114	405,002	0	0.07%
5	Communist Party of India (Marxist–Leninist) Liberation (in some states)	22	711,715	0	0.12%
6	Communist Party of India (Marxist–Leninist) Red Star (in some states)	29	90,648	0	0.02%
7	Revolutionary Socialist Party	6	709,685	1	0.12%
8	Marxist Communist Party of India (United) (Andhra Pradesh)	6	21,045	0	0.01%
9	Revolutionary Socialist Party of India (Marxist) (Bihar)	2	17,125	0	0.01
10	Independents	3	752,754	0	0.14%
	Total	336	17,352,918	6	2.93%

== Statewise candidate list ==
=== Andhra Pradesh (8 out of 25) ===
PC No.	Constituency	Reserved	Candidate	Party	Polling Date	Result
5	Anakapalli	None	P. S. Ajay Kumar	Communist Party of India (Marxist–Leninist) Liberation	11 April 2019	Lost
6	Kakinada	None	Godugu Satyanarayana	Communist Party of India (Marxist–Leninist) Liberation	11 April 2019	Lost
9	Naraspur	None	Gurugubilli Rambabu	Marxist Communist Party of India (United)	11 April 2019	Lost
13	Guntur	None	Mannava Hariprasad	Communist Party of India (Marxist-Leninist) Red Star	11 April 2019	Lost
18	Kurnool	None	K. Prabhakara Reddy	Communist Party of India (Marxist)	11 April 2019	Lost
19	Anantapur	None	Jagadeesh Devaragudi	Communist Party of India	11 April 2019	Lost
21	Kadapa	None	Gujjula Eswaraiah	Communist Party of India	11 April 2019	Lost
22	Nellore	None	Chandra Rajagopal	Communist Party of India (Marxist)	11 April 2019	Lost

Source: CPI(M)'s Website and Communist Party's Website

=== Arunachal Pradesh (1 out of 2) ===
PC No.	Constituency	Reserved	Candidate	Party	Polling Date	Result
1	Arunachal West	None	Jomin Nyokir Kara	All India Forward Bloc	11 April 2019	

=== Bihar (7 out of 40) ===
PC No.	Constituency	Reserved	Candidate	Party	Polling Date	Result
7	Jhanjharpur	None	Surendra Prasad Suman	All India Forward Bloc	23 April 2019	Lost
22	Ujiarpur	None	Ajay Kumar	Communist Party of India (Marxist)	29 April 2019	Lost
24	Begusarai	None	Kanhaiya Kumar	Communist Party of India	29 April 2019	Lost
26	Bhagalpur	None	Deepak Kumar	Socialist Unity Centre of India (Communist)	18 April 2019	Lost
28	Munger	None	Uchit Kumar	Revolutionary Socialist Party of India (Marxist)	29 April 2019	Lost
32	Arrah	None	Raju Yadav	Communist Party of India (Marxist–Leninist) Liberation	19 May 2019	Lost
40	Jamui	None	Pankaj Kumar Das	Socialist Unity Centre of India (Communist)	11 April 2019	Lost

=== Chhattisgarh (4 out of 11) ===
PC No.	Constituency	Reserved	Candidate	Party	Polling Date	Result
7	Durg	None	Aatma Ram Sahu	Socialist Unity Centre of India (Communist)	23 April 2019	Lost
8	Raipur	None	Devendra Kumar Patil	Socialist Unity Centre of India (Communist)	23 April 2019	Lost
9	Mahasamund	None	Bhojlal Netam	Communist Party of India (Marxist-Leninist) Red Star	18 April 2019	Lost
10	Bastar	ST	Ramu Ram Mourya	Communist Party of India	11 April 2019	Lost

=== Jharkhand (5 out of 14) ===
PC No.	Constituency	Reserved	Candidate	Party	Polling Date	Result
1	Rajmahal	ST	Gopin Soren	Communist Party of India (Marxist)	19 May 2019	Lost
2	Dumka	ST	Senapati Murmu	Communist Party of India	19 May 2019	Lost
4	Chatra	None	Arjun Kumar	Communist Party of India	29 April 2019	Lost
13	Palamau	SC	Madan Ram	Communist Party of India (Marxist-Leninist) Red Star	29 April 2019	Lost
14	Hazaribagh	None	Bhubneshwar Prasad Mehta	Communist Party of India	6 May 2019	Lost

=== Kerala (20 out of 20) ===
PC No.	Constituency	Reserved	Candidate	Party	Polling Date	Result
1	Kasaragod	None	K. P. Satheesh Chandran	Communist Party of India (Marxist)	23 April 2019	Lost
2	Kannur	None	P.K. Sreemathy	Communist Party of India (Marxist)	23 April 2019	Lost
3	Vatakara	None	P. Jayarajan	Communist Party of India (Marxist)	23 April 2019	Lost
4	Wayanad	None	P.P. Suneer	Communist Party of India	23 April 2019	Lost
5	Kozhikode	None	A. Pradeepkumar	Communist Party of India (Marxist)	23 April 2019	Lost
6	Malappuram	None	V.P. Sanu	Communist Party of India (Marxist)	23 April 2019	Lost
7	Ponnani	None	P. V. Anvar	Independent (supported by CPI(M))	23 April 2019	Lost
8	Palakkad	None	M.B. Rajesh	Communist Party of India (Marxist)	23 April 2019	Lost
9	Alathur	SC	P.K. Biju	Communist Party of India (Marxist)	23 April 2019	Lost
10	Thrissur	None	Rajaji Mathew Thomas	Communist Party of India	23 April 2019	Lost
11	Chalakudy	None	Innocent Vareed Thekkethala	Communist Party of India (Marxist)	23 April 2019	Lost
12	Ernakulam	None	P. Rajeev	Communist Party of India (Marxist)	23 April 2019	Lost
13	Idukki	None	Joice George	Independent (supported by CPI(M))	23 April 2019	Lost
14	Kottayam	None	V. N. Vasavan	Communist Party of India (Marxist)	23 April 2019	Lost
15	Alappuzha	None	A. M. Ariff	Communist Party of India (Marxist)	23 April 2019	Won
16	Mavelikara	SC	Chittayam Gopakumar	Communist Party of India	23 April 2019	Lost
17	Pathanamthitta	None	Veena George	Communist Party of India (Marxist)	23 April 2019	Lost
18	Kollam	None	K. N. Balagopal	Communist Party of India (Marxist)	23 April 2019	Lost
19	Attingal	None	A. Sampath	Communist Party of India (Marxist)	23 April 2019	Lost
20	Thiruvananthapuram	None	C. Divakaran	Communist Party of India	23 April 2019	Lost

Source: CPI(M)'s Website and Communist Party's Website

=== Tamil Nadu (4 out of 39) ===
PC No.	Constituency	Reserved	Candidate	Party	Polling Date	Result
18	Tiruppur	None	K. Subbarayan	Communist Party of India	18 April 2019	Won
20	Coimbatore	None	P. R. Natarajan	Communist Party of India (Marxist)	18 April 2019	Won
29	Nagapattinam	None	M. Selvarasu	Communist Party of India	18 April 2019	Won
32	Madurai	None	S. Venkatesan	Communist Party of India (Marxist)	18 April 2019	Won

Source: First List CPI(M)'s Website and Communist Party's Website

=== Tripura (2 out of 2) ===
PC No.	Constituency	Reserved	Candidate	Party	Polling Date	Result
1	Tripura East	ST	Jitendra Choudhury	Communist Party of India (Marxist)	23 April 2019	Lost
2	Tripura West	None	Sankar Prasad Datta	Communist Party of India (Marxist)	11 April 2019	Lost

Source: First List CPI(M)'s Website

=== Uttarakhand (3 out of 5) ===
PC No.	Constituency	Reserved	Candidate	Party	Polling Date	Result
1	Tehri Garhwal	None	Rajendra Purohit	Communist Party of India (Marxist)	11 April 2019	Lost
2	Garhwal	None	Mukesh Semwal	Socialist Unity Centre of India (Communist)	11 April 2019	Lost
4	Nainital–Udhamsingh Nagar	None	Kailash Pandey	Communist Party of India (Marxist–Leninist) Liberation	11 April 2019	Lost

Source: CPI(M)'s Website

=== West Bengal (40 out of 42) ===
- Some seats are yet to be included

PC No.	Constituency	Reserved	Candidate	Party	Polling Date	Result
1	Cooch Behar	SC	Gobinda Roy	All India Forward Bloc	11 April 2019	Lost
2	Alipurduars	ST	Mili Oraon	Revolutionary Socialist Party	11 April 2019	Lost
3	Jalpaiguri	SC	Bhagirath Roy	Communist Party of India (Marxist)	18 April 2019	Lost
4	Darjeeling	None	Saman Pathak	Communist Party of India (Marxist)	18 April 2019	Lost
5	Raiganj	None	Mohammed Salim	Communist Party of India (Marxist)	18 April 2019	Lost
6	Balurghat	None	Ranen Burman	Revolutionary Socialist Party	23 April 2019	Lost
7	Maldah Uttar	None	Biswanath Ghosh	Communist Party of India (Marxist)	23 April 2019	Lost
9	Jangipur	None	Zulfikar Ali	Communist Party of India (Marxist)	23 April 2019	Lost
11	Murshidabad	None	Badaruddoza Khan	Communist Party of India (Marxist)	23 April 2019	Lost
12	Krishnanagar	None	Dr Santanu Jha	Communist Party of India (Marxist)	29 April 2019	Lost
13	Ranaghat	SC	Ruma Biswas	Communist Party of India (Marxist)	29 April 2019	Lost
14	Bangaon	SC	Alokesh Das	Communist Party of India (Marxist)	6 May 2019	Lost
15	Barakpur	None	Gargi Chatterjee	Communist Party of India (Marxist)	6 May 2019	Lost
16	Dum Dum	None	Nepaldeb Bhattacharya	Communist Party of India (Marxist)	19 May 2019	Lost
17	Barasat	None	Haripada Biswas	All India Forward Bloc	19 May 2019	Lost
18	Basirhat	None	Pallav Sengupta	Communist Party of India	19 May 2019	Lost
21	Diamond Harbour	None	Fuad Halim	Communist Party of India (Marxist)	19 May 2019	Lost
22	Jadavpur	None	Bikash Ranjan Bhattacharya	Communist Party of India (Marxist)	19 May 2019	Lost
23	Kolkata Dakshin	None	Nandini Mukherjee	Communist Party of India (Marxist)	19 May 2019	Lost
26	Uluberia	None	Maksuda Khatun	Communist Party of India (Marxist)	6 May 2019	Lost
28	Hooghly	None	Pradip Saha	Communist Party of India (Marxist)	6 May 2019	Lost
29	Arambagh	SC	Sakti Mohan Malik	Communist Party of India (Marxist)	6 May 2019	Lost
32	Ghatal	None	Tapan Ganguly	Communist Party of India	12 May 2019	Lost
34	Medinipur	None	Biplab Bhatta	Communist Party of India	12 May 2019	Lost
35	Purulia	None	Bir Singh Mahato	All India Forward Bloc	12 May 2019	Lost
37	Bishnupur	SC	Sunil Khan	Communist Party of India (Marxist)	12 May 2019	Lost
38	Bardhaman Purba	SC	Iswar Chandra Das	Communist Party of India (Marxist)	29 April 2019	Lost
40	Bardhaman-Durgapur	None	Abhas Roy Choudhury	Communist Party of India (Marxist)	29 April 2019	Lost
42	Birbhum	None	Rezaul Karim	Independent	29 April 2019	Lost

Source: CPI(M) West Bengal

=== Rajasthan (6 out of 25) ===
Sl No.	Constituency	Reserved	Candidate	Party	Polling Date	Result
1	Bikaner	SC	Shopat Ram	Communist Party of India (Marxist)	6 May 2019	Lost
2	Sikar	None	Amra Ram	Communist Party of India (Marxist)	6 May 2019	Lost
3	Churu	None	Balwan Singh Poonia	Communist Party of India (Marxist)	6 May 2019	Lost
4	Chittorgarh	SC	Radha Bhandari	Communist Party of India	29 April 2019	Lost
5	Ganganagar	SC	Revataram Naik	Communist Party of India	6 May 2019	Lost
6	Udaipur	ST	Ghanshyam Thayad	Communist Party of India	29 April 2019	Lost

=== Maharashtra ===
Sl No.	Constituency	Reserved	Candidate	Party	Polling Date	Result
1	Dindori	ST	Jeeva Pandu Gavit	Communist Party of India (Marxist)	29 April 2019	Lost
2	Parbhani	None	Rajen Kshirsagar	Communist Party of India	18 April 2019	Lost
3	Shirdi	SC	Bansi Satupute	Communist Party of India	29 April 2019	Lost

== See also ==
List of Left Democratic Front candidates in the 2014 Indian general election
List of West Bengal Left Front candidates in the 2014 Indian general election
List of Left Front candidates in the 2019 Indian general election
List of Left Front candidates in the 2024 Indian general election

- List of National Democratic Alliance candidates in the 2019 Indian general election
- List of United Progressive Alliance candidates in the 2019 Indian general election
