= List of United Progressive Alliance candidates in the 2014 Indian general election =

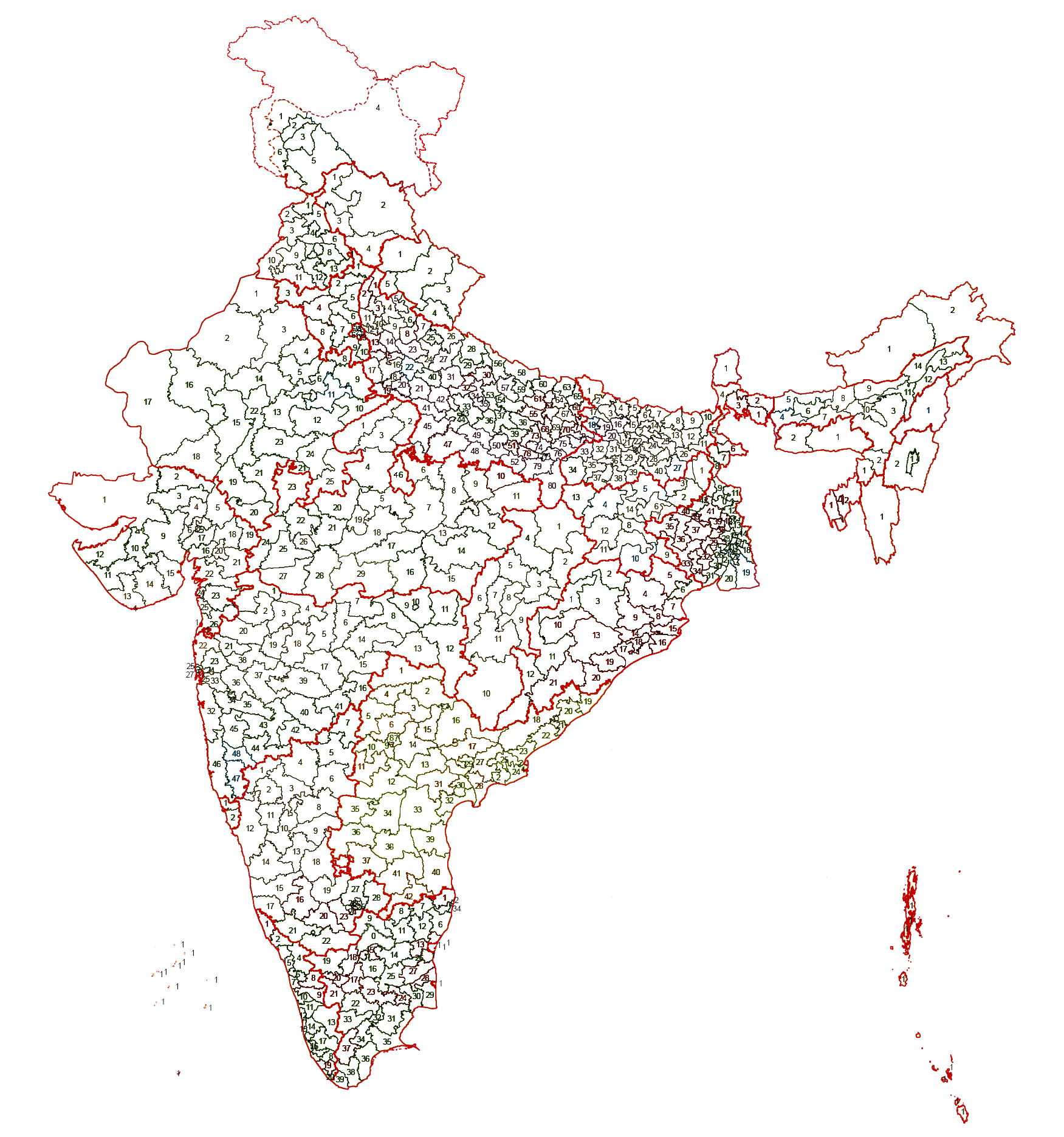
Lok Sabha constituencies of India

United Progressive Alliance is an Indian political party coalition led by Indian National Congress.

== Seat sharing summary ==
For the 2014 Indian general election, the UPA's is an alliance led for Indian National Congress with following parties:

Constituents of United Progressive Alliance (Pre-poll Alliance)
#	Party	Alliance in states	Seats sharing	References
1	Indian National Congress	All States and UTs	464	
2	Rashtriya Janata Dal	Bihar, Jharkhand	28	
3	Nationalist Congress Party	Bihar, Goa, Gujarat, Maharashtra	23	
4	Rashtriya Lok Dal	Uttar Pradesh	8	
5	Jharkhand Mukti Morcha	Jharkhand	4	
6	Jammu and Kashmir National Conference	Jammu and Kashmir	3	
7	Mahan Dal	Uttar Pradesh	3	
8	Indian Union Muslim League	Kerala	2	
9	Socialist Janata (Democratic)	Kerala	1	
10	Kerala Congress (M)	Kerala	1	
11	Revolutionary Socialist Party	Kerala	1	
12	Bodoland People's Front	Assam	1	
13	Communist Party of India	Andhra Pradesh	1	
Total UPA Candidates			540	

== Andhra Pradesh ==
INC (41) CPI (1)

Constituency No.	Constituency	Reserved	Candidate	Party	Result
1	Adilabad	ST	Naresh Jadhav	Indian National Congress	Lost
2	Peddapalli	SC	Gaddam Vivek Venkatswamy	Indian National Congress	Lost
3	Karimnagar	None	Ponnam Prabhakar Goud	Indian National Congress	Lost
4	Nizamabad	None	Madhu Goud Yaskhi	Indian National Congress	Lost
5	Zahirabad	None	Suresh Shetkar	Indian National Congress	Lost
6	Medak	None	P. Shravan Kumar Reddy	Indian National Congress	Lost
7	Malkajgiri	None	Sarve Satyanarayana	Indian National Congress	Lost
8	Secunderabad	None	Anjan Kumar Yadav	Indian National Congress	Lost
9	Hyderabad	None	S. Krishna Reddy	Indian National Congress	Lost
10	Chevella	None	Patlolla Karthik Reddy	Indian National Congress	Lost
11	Mahbubnagar	None	Jaipal Reddy	Indian National Congress	Lost
12	Nagarkurnool	SC	Nandi Yellaiah	Indian National Congress	Won
13	Nalgonda	None	Gutha Sukender Reddy	Indian National Congress	Won
14	Bhongir	None	Komatireddy Raj Gopal Reddy	Indian National Congress	Lost
15	Warangal	SC	Siricilla Rajaiah	Indian National Congress	Lost
16	Mahabubabad	ST	Balram Naik	Indian National Congress	Lost
17	Khammam	None	Kankanala Narayana	Communist Party of India	Lost
18	Araku	ST	Kishore Chandra Deo	Indian National Congress	Lost
19	Srikakulam	None	Killi Krupa Rani	Indian National Congress	Lost
20	Vizianagaram	None	Botsa Jhansi Lakshmi	Indian National Congress	Lost
21	Visakhapatnam	None	Satyanarayana Bolisetty	Indian National Congress	Lost
22	Anakapalli	None	Thota Vijayalakshmi	Indian National Congress	Lost
23	Kakinada	None	Mallipudi Raju Pallam Mangapati	Indian National Congress	Lost
24	Amalapuram	SC	A. J. Venkata Butchi Maheshwara Rao	Indian National Congress	Lost
25	Rajahmundry	None	Kandula Lakshmi Durgesh Prasad	Indian National Congress	Lost
26	Naraspur	None	Kanumuri Bapi Raju	Indian National Congress	Lost
27	Eluru	None	Musunuri Nageswar Rao	Indian National Congress	Lost
28	Machilipatnam	None	Sistla Ramesh	Indian National Congress	Lost
29	Vijayawada	None	Avinash Devineni	Indian National Congress	Lost
30	Guntur	None	Shaikh Abdul Waheed	Indian National Congress	Lost
31	Narasaraopet	None	Kasu Venkata Krishna Reddy	Indian National Congress	Lost
32	Bapatla	SC	Panabaka Lakshmi	Indian National Congress	Lost
33	Ongole	None	Darsi Pawan Kumar	Indian National Congress	Lost
34	Nandyal	None	B. Y. Ramaiah	Indian National Congress	Lost
35	Kurnool	None	Kotla Jayasurya Prakasha Reddy	Indian National Congress	Lost
36	Anantapur	None	P. Anil Chowdary	Indian National Congress	Lost
37	Hindupur	None	Guttur Chinna Venkata Ramudu	Indian National Congress	Lost
38	Kadapa	None	Veena Ajaya Kumar	Indian National Congress	Lost
39	Nellore	None	Vakati Narayana Reddy	Indian National Congress	Lost
40	Tirupati	SC	Chinta Mohan	Indian National Congress	Lost
41	Rajampet	None	Sai Prathap Annayyagari	Indian National Congress	Lost
42	Chittoor	SC	B. Rajagopal	Indian National Congress	Lost

== Arunachal Pradesh ==
INC (2)

Constituency No.	Constituency	Reserved	Candidate	Party	Result
1	Arunachal West	None	Takam Sanjoy	Indian National Congress	Lost
2	Arunachal East	None	Ninong Ering	Indian National Congress	Won

== Assam ==
INC (13) BPF (1)

Constituency No.	Constituency	Reserved	Candidate	Party	Result
1	Karimganj	SC	Lalit Mohan Suklabaidya	Indian National Congress	Lost
2	Silchar	None	Sushmita Dev	Indian National Congress	Won
3	Autonomous District	ST	Biren Singh Engti	Indian National Congress	Won
4	Dhubri	None	Mohammad Wajid Ali Chaudhary	Indian National Congress	Lost
5	Kokrajhar	ST	Chandan Brahma	Bodoland People's Front	Lost
6	Barpeta	None	Ismail Hussain	Indian National Congress	Lost
7	Gauhati	None	Manas Bora	Indian National Congress	Lost
8	Mangaldoi	None	Kirip Chaliha	Indian National Congress	Lost
9	Tezpur	None	Bhupen Bora	Indian National Congress	Lost
10	Nowgong	None	Jon Jonali Baruah	Indian National Congress	Lost
11	Kaliabor	None	Gaurav Gogoi	Indian National Congress	Won
12	Jorhat	None	Bijoy Krishna Handique	Indian National Congress	Lost
13	Dibrugarh	None	Paban Singh Ghatowar	Indian National Congress	Lost
14	Lakhimpur	None	Ranee Narah	Indian National Congress	Lost

== Bihar ==
RJD (27) INC (12) NCP (1)

Constituency No.	Constituency	Reserved	Candidate	Party	Result
1	Valmiki Nagar	None	Purnmasi Ram	Indian National Congress	Lost
2	Paschim Champaran	None	Raghunath Jha	Rashtriya Janata Dal	Lost
3	Purvi Champaran	None	Vinod Kumar Srivastava	Rashtriya Janata Dal	Lost
4	Sheohar	None	Anwarul Haque	Rashtriya Janata Dal	Lost
5	Sitamarhi	None	Sitaram Yadav	Rashtriya Janata Dal	Lost
6	Madhubani	None	Abdul Bari Siddiqui	Rashtriya Janata Dal	Lost
7	Jhanjharpur	None	Mangilal	Rashtriya Janata Dal	Lost
8	Supaul	None	Ranjeet Ranjan	Indian National Congress	Won
9	Araria	None	Mohammed Taslimuddin	Rashtriya Janata Dal	Won
10	Kishanganj	None	Mohammad Asrarul Haque	Indian National Congress	Won
11	Katihar	None	Tariq Anwar	Nationalist Congress Party	Won
12	Purnia	None	Amarnath Tiwari	Indian National Congress	Lost
13	Madhepura	None	Pappu Yadav	Rashtriya Janata Dal	Won
14	Darbhanga	None	Mohammad Ali Ashraf Fatmi	Rashtriya Janata Dal	Lost
15	Muzaffarpur	None	Akhilesh Pratap Singh	Indian National Congress	Lost
16	Vaishali	None	Raghuvansh Prasad Singh	Rashtriya Janata Dal	Lost
17	Gopalganj	SC	Jyoti	Indian National Congress	Lost
18	Siwan	None	Hena Shahab	Rashtriya Janata Dal	Lost
19	Maharajganj	None	Prabhunath Singh	Rashtriya Janata Dal	Lost
20	Saran	None	Rabri Devi	Rashtriya Janata Dal	Lost
21	Hajipur	SC	Sanjeev Prasad Tony	Indian National Congress	Lost
22	Ujiarpur	None	Alok Kumar Mehta	Rashtriya Janata Dal	Lost
23	Samastipur	SC	Ashok Ram	Indian National Congress	Lost
24	Begusarai	None	Ramjivan Singh	Rashtriya Janata Dal	Lost
25	Khagaria	None	Krishna Yadav	Rashtriya Janata Dal	Lost
26	Bhagalpur	None	Bulo Mondal	Rashtriya Janata Dal	Won
27	Banka	None	Jay Prakash Narayan Yadav	Rashtriya Janata Dal	Won
28	Munger	None	Pragati Mehta	Rashtriya Janata Dal	Lost
29	Nalanda	None	Ashish Ranjan Sinha	Indian National Congress	Lost
30	Patna Sahib	None	Kunal Singh	Indian National Congress	Lost
31	Pataliputra	None	Misha Bharti	Rashtriya Janata Dal	Lost
32	Arrah	None	Bhagwan Kushwaha	Rashtriya Janata Dal	Lost
33	Buxar	None	Jagnanad Singh	Rashtriya Janata Dal	Lost
34	Sasaram	SC	Meira Kumar	Indian National Congress	Lost
35	Karakat	None	Kanti Singh	Rashtriya Janata Dal	Lost
36	Jahanabad	None	Surendra Prasad Yadav	Rashtriya Janata Dal	Lost
37	Aurangabad	None	Nikhil Kumar	Indian National Congress	Lost
38	Gaya	SC	Ramji Majhi	Rashtriya Janata Dal	Lost
39	Nawada	None	Raj Ballabh Yadav	Rashtriya Janata Dal	Lost
40	Jamui	SC	Sudhanshu Shekhar Bhaskar	Rashtriya Janata Dal	Lost

== Chhattisgarh ==
INC (11)

Constituency No.	Constituency	Reserved	Candidate	Party	Result
1	Sarguja	ST	Ramdeo Ram	Indian National Congress	Lost
2	Raigarh	ST	Aarti Singh	Indian National Congress	Lost
3	Janjgir	SC	Premchand Jaisi	Indian National Congress	Lost
4	Korba	None	Charan Das Mahant	Indian National Congress	Lost
5	Bilaspur	None	Karuna Shukla	Indian National Congress	Lost
6	Rajnandgaon	None	Kamleshwar Verma	Indian National Congress	Lost
7	Durg	None	Tamradhwaj Sahu	Indian National Congress	Won
8	Raipur	None	Satyanarayan Sharma	Indian National Congress	Lost
9	Mahasamund	None	Ajit Jogi	Indian National Congress	Lost
10	Bastar	ST	Deepak Karma	Indian National Congress	Lost
11	Kanker	ST	Phoolo Devi Netam	Indian National Congress	Lost

== Goa ==
INC (2)

Constituency No.	Constituency	Reserved	Candidate	Party	Result
1	North Goa	SC	Ravi S. Naik	Indian National Congress	Lost
2	South Goa	None	Aleixo Reginaldo Lourenco	Indian National Congress	Lost

== Gujarat ==
INC (25) NCP (1)

Constituency No.	Constituency	Reserved	Candidate	Party	Result
1	Kachchh	SC	Dineshbhai Parmar	Indian National Congress	Lost
2	Banaskantha	None	Joitabhai Kasnabhai Patel	Indian National Congress	Lost
3	Patan	None	Bhavsinh Rathod	Indian National Congress	Lost
4	Mahesana	None	Jivabhai Ambalal Patel	Indian National Congress	Lost
5	Sabarkantha	None	Shankersinh Vaghela	Indian National Congress	Lost
6	Gandhinagar	None	Kirit Patel	Indian National Congress	Lost
7	Ahmedabad East	None	Himmatsingh Patel	Indian National Congress	Lost
8	Ahmedabad West	SC	Ishwar Makwana	Indian National Congress	Lost
9	Surendranagar	None	Somabhai Gandalal Koli Patel	Indian National Congress	Lost
10	Rajkot	None	Kuwarjibhai Bavalia	Indian National Congress	Lost
11	Porbandar	None	Kandhal Jadeja	Nationalist Congress Party	Lost
12	Jamnagar	None	Ahir Vikrambhai Arjanbhai Madam	Indian National Congress	Lost
13	Junagadh	None	Punjabhai Vansh	Indian National Congress	Lost
14	Amreli	None	Virjibhai Thummar	Indian National Congress	Lost
15	Bhavnagar	None	Pravin Rathod	Indian National Congress	Lost
16	Anand	None	Bharatsinh Solanki	Indian National Congress	Lost
17	Kheda	None	Dinsha Patel	Indian National Congress	Lost
18	Panchmahal	None	Ramsingh Parmar	Indian National Congress	Lost
19	Dahod	ST	Dr Prabhaben Taviyad	Indian National Congress	Lost
20	Vadodara	None	Madhusudan Mistry	Indian National Congress	Lost
21	Chhota Udaipur	ST	Naranbhai Rathwa	Indian National Congress	Lost
22	Bharuch	None	Jayesh Patel	Indian National Congress	Lost
23	Bardoli	ST	Tushar Amarsinh Chaudhary	Indian National Congress	Lost
24	Surat	None	Naishadh Desai	Indian National Congress	Lost
25	Navsari	None	Maksud Mirza	Indian National Congress	Lost
26	Valsad	ST	Kishanbhai Vestabhai Patel	Indian National Congress	Lost

== Haryana ==
INC (10)

Constituency No.	Constituency	Reserved	Candidate	Party	Result
1	Ambala	SC	Raj Kumar Valmiki	Indian National Congress	Lost
2	Kurukshetra	None	Naveen Jindal	Indian National Congress	Lost
3	Sirsa	SC	Ashok Tanwar	Indian National Congress	Lost
4	Hissar	None	Sampat Singh	Indian National Congress	Lost
5	Karnal	None	Arvind Kumar Sharma	Indian National Congress	Lost
6	Sonepat	None	Jagbir Malik	Indian National Congress	Lost
7	Rohtak	None	Deepender Singh Hooda	Indian National Congress	Won
8	Bhiwani-Mahendragarh	None	Shruti Choudhry	Indian National Congress	Lost
9	Gurgaon	None	Rao Dharampal	Indian National Congress	Lost
10	Faridabad	None	Avtar Singh Bhadana	Indian National Congress	Lost

== Himachal Pradesh ==
INC (4)

Constituency No.	Constituency	Reserved	Candidate	Party	Result
1	Kangra	None	Chander Kumar	Indian National Congress	Lost
2	Mandi	None	Pratibha Singh	Indian National Congress	Lost
3	Hamirpur	None	Rajinder Singh	Indian National Congress	Lost
4	Shimla	SC	Mohan Lal Bragta	Indian National Congress	Lost

== Jammu and Kashmir ==
INC (3) JKNC (3)

Constituency No.	Constituency	Reserved	Candidate	Party	Result
1	Baramulla	None	Sharifuddin Shariq	Jammu & Kashmir National Conference	Lost
2	Srinagar	None	Farooq Abdullah	Jammu & Kashmir National Conference	Lost
3	Anantnag	None	Mirza Mehboob Beg	Jammu & Kashmir National Conference	Lost
4	Ladakh	None	Tsering Samphel	Indian National Congress	Lost
5	Udhampur	None	Ghulam Nabi Azad	Indian National Congress	Lost
6	Jammu	None	Madan Lal Sharma	Indian National Congress	Lost

== Jharkhand ==
INC (9) JMM (4) RJD (1)

Constituency No.	Constituency	Reserved	Candidate	Party	Result
1	Rajmahal	ST	Vijay Kumar Hansdak	Jharkhand Mukti Morcha	Won
2	Dumka	ST	Sibu Soren	Jharkhand Mukti Morcha	Won
3	Godda	None	Furkan Ansari	Indian National Congress	Lost
4	Chatra	None	Dhiraj Pratap Sahu	Indian National Congress	Lost
5	Kodarma	None	Tilakdhari Prasad Singh	Indian National Congress	Lost
6	Giridih	None	Jagarnath Mahto	Jharkhand Mukti Morcha	Lost
7	Dhanbad	None	Ajay Dubey	Indian National Congress	Lost
8	Ranchi	None	Subodh Kant Sahay	Indian National Congress	Lost
9	Jamshedpur	None	Niroop Mahanty	Jharkhand Mukti Morcha	Lost
10	Singhbhum	ST	Chitrasen Sinku	Indian National Congress	Lost
11	Khunti	ST	Kalicharan Munda	Indian National Congress	Lost
12	Lohardaga	ST	Rameshwar Oraon	Indian National Congress	Lost
13	Palamau	SC	Manoj Kumar	Rashtriya Janata Dal	Lost
14	Hazaribagh	None	Saurabh Narain Singh	Indian National Congress	Lost

== Karnataka ==
INC (28)

Constituency No.	Constituency	Reserved	Candidate	Party	Result
1	Chikkodi	None	Prakash Babanna Hukkeri	Indian National Congress	Won
2	Belgaum	None	Lakshmi Hebbalkar	Indian National Congress	Lost
3	Bagalkot	None	Ajay Kumar Sarnaik	Indian National Congress	Lost
4	Bijapur	SC	Prakash Rathod	Indian National Congress	Lost
5	Gulbarga	SC	Mallikarjun Kharge	Indian National Congress	Won
6	Raichur	ST	B. V. Naik	Indian National Congress	Won
7	Bidar	None	N. Dharam Singh	Indian National Congress	Lost
8	Koppal	None	Basavaraj Hitnal	Indian National Congress	Lost
9	Bellary	ST	N. Y. Hanumanthappa	Indian National Congress	Lost
10	Haveri	None	Saleem Ahamed	Indian National Congress	Lost
11	Dharwad	None	Vinay Kulkarni	Indian National Congress	Lost
12	Uttara Kannada	None	Prashant Deshpande	Indian National Congress	Lost
13	Davanagere	None	S.S. Mallikarjun	Indian National Congress	Lost
14	Shimoga	None	Manjunath Bhandary	Indian National Congress	Lost
15	Udupi Chikmagalur	None	K. Jayaprakash Hegde	Indian National Congress	Lost
16	Hassan	None	A. Manju	Indian National Congress	Lost
17	Dakshina Kannada	None	Janardhana Poojary	Indian National Congress	Lost
18	Chitradurga	SC	B N Chandrappa	Indian National Congress	Won
19	Tumkur	None	S.P. Muddahanumegowda	Indian National Congress	Won
20	Mandya	None	Divya Spandana Ramya	Indian National Congress	Lost
21	Mysore	None	Adagur H. Vishwanath	Indian National Congress	Lost
22	Chamarajanagar	SC	R. Dhruvanarayana	Indian National Congress	Won
23	Bangalore Rural	None	D. K. Suresh	Indian National Congress	Won
24	Bangalore North	None	C Narayanaswamy	Indian National Congress	Lost
25	Bangalore Central	None	Rizwan Arshad	Indian National Congress	Lost
26	Bangalore South	None	Nandan Nilekani	Indian National Congress	Lost
27	Chikkballapur	None	Veerappa Moily	Indian National Congress	Won
28	Kolar	SC	K.H. Muniyappa	Indian National Congress	Won

== Kerala ==
INC (15) IUML (2) RSP (1) KC(M) (1) SJ(D) (1)

Constituency No.	Constituency	Reserved	Candidate	Party	Result
1	Kasaragod	None	T. Siddique	Indian National Congress	Lost
2	Kannur	None	K. Sudhakaran	Indian National Congress	Lost
3	Vatakara	None	Mullappally Ramachandran	Indian National Congress	Won
4	Wayanad	None	M. I. Shanavas	Indian National Congress	Won
5	Kozhikode	None	M. K. Raghavan	Indian National Congress	Won
6	Malappuram	None	E. Ahamed	Indian Union Muslim League	Won
7	Ponnani	None	E. T. Mohammed Basheer	Indian Union Muslim League	Won
8	Palakkad	None	M. P. Veerendra Kumar	Socialist Janata (Democratic)	Lost
9	Alathur	SC	Sheeba K. A.	Indian National Congress	Lost
10	Thrissur	None	K. P. Dhanapalan	Indian National Congress	Lost
11	Chalakudy	None	P. C. Chacko	Indian National Congress	Lost
12	Ernakulam	None	K. V. Thomas	Indian National Congress	Won
13	Idukki	None	Dean Kuriakose	Indian National Congress	Lost
14	Kottayam	None	Jose.K.Mani	Kerala Congress (M)	Won
15	Alappuzha	None	K. C. Venugopal	Indian National Congress	Won
16	Mavelikara	SC	Kodikunnil Suresh	Indian National Congress	Won
17	Pathanamthitta	None	Anto Antony	Indian National Congress	Won
18	Kollam	None	N. K. Premachandran	Revolutionary Socialist Party	Won
19	Attingal	None	Bindu Krishna	Indian National Congress	Lost
20	Thiruvananthapuram	None	Shashi Tharoor	Indian National Congress	Won

== Madhya Pradesh ==
INC (29)

Constituency No.	Constituency	Reserved	Candidate	Party	Result
1	Morena	None	Govind Singh	Indian National Congress	Lost
2	Bhind	SC	Imarti Devi	Indian National Congress	Lost
3	Gwalior	None	Ashok Singh	Indian National Congress	Lost
4	Guna	None	Jyotiraditya Madhavrao Scindia	Indian National Congress	Won
5	Sagar	None	Govind Singh Rajput	Indian National Congress	Lost
6	Tikamgarh	SC	Kamleshwar Verma	Indian National Congress	Lost
7	Damoh	None	Mahendra Pratap	Indian National Congress	Lost
8	Khajuraho	None	Raja Pateria	Indian National Congress	Lost
9	Satna	None	Ajay Singh	Indian National Congress	Lost
10	Rewa	None	Sunderlal Tiwari	Indian National Congress	Lost
11	Sidhi	None	Indrajeet Patel	Indian National Congress	Lost
12	Shahdol	ST	Rajesh Nandini Singh	Indian National Congress	Lost
13	Jabalpur	None	Vivek Tankha	Indian National Congress	Lost
14	Mandla	ST	Omkar Markam	Indian National Congress	Lost
15	Balaghat	None	Heena Kaware	Indian National Congress	Lost
16	Chhindwara	None	Kamal Nath	Indian National Congress	Won
17	Hoshangabad	None	Devendra Patel	Indian National Congress	Lost
18	Vidisha	None	Laxman Singh	Indian National Congress	Lost
19	Bhopal	None	P.C. Sharma	Indian National Congress	Lost
20	Rajgarh	None	Narayan Singh Amlabe	Indian National Congress	Lost
21	Dewas	SC	Sajjan Kumar Verma	Indian National Congress	Lost
22	Ujjain	SC	Guddu Premchand	Indian National Congress	Lost
23	Mandsaur	None	Meenakshi Natarajan	Indian National Congress	Lost
24	Ratlam	ST	Kantilal Bhuria	Indian National Congress	Lost
25	Dhar	ST	Umang Singhar	Indian National Congress	Lost
26	Indore	None	Satyanarayan Patel	Indian National Congress	Lost
27	Khargone	ST	Ramesh Patel	Indian National Congress	Lost
28	Khandwa	None	Arun Subhashchandra Yadav	Indian National Congress	Lost
29	Betul	ST	Rahul Chaudhary	Indian National Congress	Lost

== Maharashtra ==
INC (26) NCP (21) BVA (1)

Constituency No.	Constituency	Reserved	Candidate	Party	Result
1	Nandurbar	ST	Manikrao Hodlya Gavit	Indian National Congress	Lost
2	Dhule	None	Amrishbhai Rasikbhai Patel	Indian National Congress	Lost
3	Jalgaon	None	Satish Pawar	Nationalist Congress Party	Lost
4	Raver	None	Manish Jain	Nationalist Congress Party	Lost
5	Buldhana	None	Radhakrishna Ingle	Nationalist Congress Party	Lost
6	Akola	None	Hidayat Patel	Indian National Congress	Lost
7	Amravati	SC	Navneet Kaur	Nationalist Congress Party	Lost
8	Wardha	None	Sagar Maghe	Indian National Congress	Lost
9	Ramtek	SC	Mukul Wasnik	Indian National Congress	Lost
10	Nagpur	None	Vilas Muttemwar	Indian National Congress	Lost
11	Bhandara-Gondiya	None	Praful Patel	Nationalist Congress Party	Lost
12	Gadchiroli-Chimur	ST	Namdeo Usendi	Indian National Congress	Lost
13	Chandrapur	None	Sanjay Deotale	Indian National Congress	Lost
14	Yavatmal-Washim	None	Shivajirao Moghe	Indian National Congress	Lost
15	Hingoli	None	Rajeev Satav	Indian National Congress	Won
16	Nanded	None	Ashok Chavan	Indian National Congress	Won
17	Parbhani	None	Vijay Bhamble	Nationalist Congress Party	Lost
18	Jalna	None	Vilas Autade	Indian National Congress	Lost
19	Aurangabad	None	Nitin Patil	Indian National Congress	Lost
20	Dindori	ST	Bharati Pawar	Nationalist Congress Party	Lost
21	Nashik	None	Chhagan Bhujbal	Nationalist Congress Party	Lost
22	Palghar	ST	Baliram Sukur Jadhav	Bahujan Vikas Aaghadi	Lost
23	Bhiwandi	None	Vishwanath Patil	Indian National Congress	Lost
24	Kalyan	None	Anand Paranjape	Nationalist Congress Party	Lost
25	Thane	None	Sanjeev Naik	Nationalist Congress Party	Lost
26	Mumbai North	None	Sanjay Nirupam	Indian National Congress	Lost
27	Mumbai North West	None	Gurudas Kamat	Indian National Congress	Lost
28	Mumbai North East	None	Sanjay Dina Patil	Nationalist Congress Party	Lost
29	Mumbai North Central	None	Priya Dutt	Indian National Congress	Lost
30	Mumbai South Central	None	Eknath Gaikwad	Indian National Congress	Lost
31	Mumbai South	None	Milind Deora	Indian National Congress	Lost
32	Raigad	None	Sunil Tatkare	Nationalist Congress Party	Lost
33	Maval	None	Rahul Narvekar	Nationalist Congress Party	Lost
34	Pune	None	Vishwajeet Kadam	Indian National Congress	Lost
35	Baramati	None	Supriya Sule	Nationalist Congress Party	Won
36	Shirur	None	Devdutt Nikam	Nationalist Congress Party	Lost
37	Ahmednagar	None	Rajeev Rajale	Nationalist Congress Party	Lost
38	Shirdi	SC	Bhausaheb Rajaram Wakchaure	Indian National Congress	Lost
39	Beed	None	Suresh Dhas	Nationalist Congress Party	Lost
40	Osmanabad	None	Padamsinh Bajirao Patil	Nationalist Congress Party	Lost
41	Latur	SC	Dattatraya Bansode	Indian National Congress	Lost
42	Solapur	SC	Sushilkumar Shinde	Indian National Congress	Lost
43	Madha	None	Vijaysingh Mohite-Patil	Nationalist Congress Party	Won
44	Sangli	None	Pratik Prakashbapu Patil	Indian National Congress	Lost
45	Satara	None	Udayanraje Bhosale	Nationalist Congress Party	Won
46	Ratnagiri–Sindhudurg	None	Nilesh Narayan Rane	Indian National Congress	Lost
47	Kolhapur	None	Dhananjay Mahadik	Nationalist Congress Party	Won
48	Hatkanangle	None	Kallappa Awade	Indian National Congress	Lost

== Manipur ==
INC (2)

Constituency No.	Constituency	Reserved	Candidate	Party	Result
1	Inner Manipur	None	Thokchom Meinya	Indian National Congress	Won
2	Outer Manipur	ST	Thangso Baite	Indian National Congress	Won

== Meghalaya ==
INC (2)

Constituency No.	Constituency	Reserved	Candidate	Party	Result
1	Shillong	None	Vincent Pala	Indian National Congress	Won
2	Tura	ST	Daryl William Cheran Momin	Indian National Congress	Lost

== Mizoram ==
INC (1)

Constituency No.	Constituency	Reserved	Candidate	Party	Result
1	Mizoram	ST	C. L. Ruala	Indian National Congress	Won

== Nagaland ==
INC (1)

Constituency No.	Constituency	Reserved	Candidate	Party	Result
1	Nagaland	None	K. V. Pusa	Indian National Congress	Lost

== Odisha ==
INC (21)

Constituency No.	Constituency	Reserved	Candidate	Party	Result
1	Bargarh	None	Sanjay Bhoi	Indian National Congress	Lost
2	Sundargarh	ST	Hemanand Biswal	Indian National Congress	Lost
3	Sambalpur	None	Amarnath Pradhan	Indian National Congress	Lost
4	Keonjhar	ST	Madhab Sardar	Indian National Congress	Lost
5	Mayurbhanj	ST	Shyam Sundar Hansdah	Indian National Congress	Lost
6	Balasore	None	Srikant Kumar Jena	Indian National Congress	Lost
7	Bhadrak	SC	Sangram Jena	Indian National Congress	Lost
8	Jajpur	SC	Ashok Das	Indian National Congress	Lost
9	Dhenkanal	None	Sudhir Kumar Samal	Indian National Congress	Lost
10	Bolangir	None	Sarat Patnaik	Indian National Congress	Lost
11	Kalahandi	None	Bhakta Charan Das	Indian National Congress	Lost
12	Nabarangpur	ST	Pradeep Kumar Majhi	Indian National Congress	Lost
13	Kandhamal	None	Harihar Karan	Indian National Congress	Lost
14	Cuttack	None	Aparajita Mohanty	Indian National Congress	Lost
15	Kendrapara	None	Dharnidhar Nayak	Indian National Congress	Lost
16	Jagatsinghpur	SC	Bibhu Prasad Tarai	Indian National Congress	Lost
17	Puri	None	Sucharita Mohanty	Indian National Congress	Lost
18	Bhubaneswar	None	Bijay Mohanty	Indian National Congress	Lost
19	Aska	None	Loknath Rath	Indian National Congress	Lost
20	Berhampur	None	Chandra Sekhar Sahu	Indian National Congress	Lost
21	Koraput	ST	Giridhar Gamang	Indian National Congress	Lost

== Punjab ==
INC (13)

Constituency No.	Constituency	Reserved	Candidate	Party	Result
1	Gurdaspur	None	Pratap Singh Bajwa	Indian National Congress	Lost
2	Amritsar	None	Capt. Amarinder Singh	Indian National Congress	Won
3	Khadoor Sahib	None	Harminder Singh Gill	Indian National Congress	Lost
4	Jalandhar	SC	Santokh Singh Chaudhary	Indian National Congress	Won
5	Hoshiarpur	SC	Mohinder Singh Kaypee	Indian National Congress	Lost
6	Anandpur Sahib	None	Ambika Soni	Indian National Congress	Lost
7	Ludhiana	None	Ravneet Singh Bittu	Indian National Congress	Won
8	Fatehgarh Sahib	SC	Sadhu Singh Dharamsot	Indian National Congress	Lost
9	Faridkot	SC	Joginder Singh Panjgrain	Indian National Congress	Lost
10	Firozpur	None	Sunil Kumar Jakhar	Indian National Congress	Lost
11	Bathinda	None	Manpreet Singh Badal	Indian National Congress	Lost
12	Sangrur	None	Vijay Inder Singla	Indian National Congress	Lost
13	Patiala	None	Preneet Kaur	Indian National Congress	Lost

== Rajasthan ==
INC (25)

Constituency No.	Constituency	Reserved	Candidate	Party	Result
1	Ganganagar	SC	Bhanwarlal Meghwal	Indian National Congress	Lost
2	Bikaner	SC	Shankar Pannu	Indian National Congress	Lost
3	Churu	None	Pratap Punia	Indian National Congress	Lost
4	Jhunjhunu	None	Rajbala Ola	Indian National Congress	Lost
5	Sikar	None	Pratap Singh Jat	Indian National Congress	Lost
6	Jaipur Rural	None	C. P. Joshi	Indian National Congress	Lost
7	Jaipur	None	Mahesh Joshi	Indian National Congress	Lost
8	Alwar	None	Jitendra Singh	Indian National Congress	Lost
9	Bharatpur	SC	Suresh Chand Yadav	Indian National Congress	Lost
10	Karauli-Dholpur	SC	Lakhiram Bairwa	Indian National Congress	Lost
11	Dausa	None	Namo Narain Meena	Indian National Congress	Lost
12	Tonk-Sawai Madhopur	None	Mohammad Azharuddin	Indian National Congress	Lost
13	Ajmer	None	Sachin Pilot	Indian National Congress	Lost
14	Nagaur	None	Jyoti Mirdha	Indian National Congress	Lost
15	Pali	None	Munni Devi Godara	Indian National Congress	Lost
16	Jodhpur	None	Chandresh Kumari Katoch	Indian National Congress	Lost
17	Barmer	None	Harish Chaudhary	Indian National Congress	Lost
18	Jalore	None	Udai Lal Anjana	Indian National Congress	Lost
19	Udaipur	ST	Raghuveer Meena	Indian National Congress	Lost
20	Banswara	ST	Reshm Mahendra Jeet Singh Malviya	Indian National Congress	Lost
21	Chittorgarh	None	Girija Vyas	Indian National Congress	Lost
22	Rajsamand	None	Gopal Singh Shekhawat	Indian National Congress	Lost
23	Bhilwara	None	Ashok Chandna	Indian National Congress	Lost
24	Kota	None	Ijyaraj Singh	Indian National Congress	Lost
25	Jhalawar-Baran	None	Pramod Jain Bhaya	Indian National Congress	Lost

== Sikkim ==
INC (1)

Constituency No.	Constituency	Reserved	Candidate	Party	Result
1	Sikkim	None	A D Subba	Indian National Congress	Lost

== Tamil Nadu ==
INC (39)

Constituency No.	Constituency	Reserved	Candidate	Party	Result
1	Thiruvallur	SC	Victory M. Jayakumar	Indian National Congress	Lost
2	Chennai North	None	Biju Chacko	Indian National Congress	Lost
3	Chennai South	None	S. V. Ramani	Indian National Congress	Lost
4	Chennai Central	None	C. D. Meyyappan	Indian National Congress	Lost
5	Sriperumbudur	None	Arul Anbarasu	Indian National Congress	Lost
6	Kancheepuram	SC	P. Viswanathan	Indian National Congress	Lost
7	Arakkonam	None	Naesey Rajesh	Indian National Congress	Lost
8	Vellore	None	J .Vijay Elanchezian	Indian National Congress	Lost
9	Krishnagiri	None	A. Chellakumar	Indian National Congress	Lost
10	Dharmapuri	None	Vazhapadi Rama Suganthan	Indian National Congress	Lost
11	Tiruvannamalai	None	A. Subramaniam	Indian National Congress	Lost
12	Arani	None	M. K. Vishnu Prasad	Indian National Congress	Lost
13	Villupuram	SC	K. Rani	Indian National Congress	Lost
14	Kallakurichi	None	R. Devadass	Indian National Congress	Lost
15	Salem	None	Mohan Kumaramangalam	Indian National Congress	Lost
16	Namakkal	None	G.R. Subramaniam	Indian National Congress	Lost
17	Erode	None	P. Gopi	Indian National Congress	Lost
18	Tiruppur	None	E. V. K. S. Elangovan	Indian National Congress	Lost
19	Nilgiris	SC	P. Gandhi	Indian National Congress	Lost
20	Coimbatore	None	R. Prabhu	Indian National Congress	Lost
21	Pollachi	None	K. Sathu Selvaraj	Indian National Congress	Lost
22	Dindigul	None	N. S. V. Chitthan	Indian National Congress	Lost
23	Karur	None	S. Jothi Mani	Indian National Congress	Lost
24	Tiruchirappalli	None	Charubala Thondaiman	Indian National Congress	Lost
25	Perambalur	None	M. Rajasekaran	Indian National Congress	Lost
26	Cuddalore	None	K.S. Alagiri	Indian National Congress	Lost
27	Chidambaram	SC	P. Vallal Peruman	Indian National Congress	Lost
28	Mayiladuthurai	None	Mani Shankar Aiyar	Indian National Congress	Lost
29	Nagapattinam	SC	T.A.P. Senthilpandian	Indian National Congress	Lost
30	Thanjavur	None	T. Krishnasamy Vandaiyar	Indian National Congress	Lost
31	Sivaganga	None	Karti P. Chidambaram	Indian National Congress	Lost
32	Madurai	None	T.N. Bharath Nachiyappan	Indian National Congress	Lost
33	Theni	None	J. M. Aaroon Rashid	Indian National Congress	Lost
34	Virudhunagar	None	Manicka Tagore	Indian National Congress	Lost
35	Ramanathapuram	None	Su. Thirunavukkarasar	Indian National Congress	Lost
36	Thoothukudi	None	A. P. C. V. Shanmugam	Indian National Congress	Lost
37	Tenkasi	SC	K. Jayakumar	Indian National Congress	Lost
38	Tirunelveli	None	S. S. Ramasubbu	Indian National Congress	Lost
39	Kanyakumari	None	H. Vasanthakumar	Indian National Congress	Lost

== Tripura ==
INC (2)

Constituency No.	Constituency	Reserved	Candidate	Party	Result
1	Tripura West	None	Arunoday Saha	Indian National Congress	Lost
2	Tripura East	ST	Sachitra Debbarma	Indian National Congress	Lost

== Uttar Pradesh ==
INC (67) RLD (8) MD (3)

Constituency No.	Constituency	Reserved for (SC/ST/None)	Candidate	Party	Result
1	Saharanpur	None	Imran Masood	Indian National Congress	Lost
2	Kairana	None	Kartar Singh Bhadana	Rashtriya Lok Dal	Lost
3	Muzaffarnagar	None	Pankaj Aggarwal	Indian National Congress	Lost
4	Bijnor	None	Jaya Prada	Rashtriya Lok Dal	Lost
5	Nagina	SC	Bhagwan Dass Rathore	Mahan Dal	Lost
6	Moradabad	None	Begum Noor Bano	Indian National Congress	Lost
7	Rampur	None	Muhammad Kazim Ali Khan	Indian National Congress	Lost
8	Sambhal	None	Acharya Pramod Krishnam	Indian National Congress	Lost
9	Amroha	None	Rakesh Tikait	Rashtriya Lok Dal	Lost
10	Meerut	None	Nagma	Indian National Congress	Lost
11	Baghpat	None	Ajit Singh	Rashtriya Lok Dal	Lost
12	Ghaziabad	None	Raj Babbar	Indian National Congress	Lost
13	Gautam Buddha Nagar	None	Ramesh Chand Tomar	Indian National Congress	Lost
14	Bulandshahr	SC	Anju	Rashtriya Lok Dal	Lost
15	Aligarh	None	Bijendra Singh	Indian National Congress	Lost
16	Hathras	SC	Niranjan Dhangar	Rashtriya Lok Dal	Lost
17	Mathura	None	Jayant Chaudhary	Rashtriya Lok Dal	Lost
18	Agra	SC	Upendra Singh Jatav	Indian National Congress	Lost
19	Fatehpur Sikri	None	Amar Singh	Rashtriya Lok Dal	Lost
20	Firozabad	None	Atul Chaturvedi	Indian National Congress	Lost
21	Mainpuri	None	None		
22	Etah	None	Jogendra Singh	Mahan Dal	Lost
23	Badaun	None	Paglanand	Mahan Dal	Lost
24	Aonla	None	Saleem Iqbal Shervani	Indian National Congress	Lost
25	Bareilly	None	Praveen Singh Aron	Indian National Congress	Lost
26	Pilibhit	None	Sanjay Kapoor	Indian National Congress	Lost
27	Shahjahanpur	SC	Chetram	Indian National Congress	Lost
28	Kheri	None	Zafar Ali Naqvi	Indian National Congress	Lost
29	Dhaurahra	None	Jitin Prasada	Indian National Congress	Lost
30	Sitapur	None	Vaishali Ali	Indian National Congress	Lost
31	Hardoi	SC	Sarvesh Kumar Jansevak	Indian National Congress	Lost
32	Misrikh	SC	Om Prakash Rawat	Indian National Congress	Lost
33	Unnao	None	Annu Tandon	Indian National Congress	Lost
34	Mohanlalganj	SC	Narendra Gautam	Indian National Congress	Lost
35	Lucknow	None	Rita Bahuguna Joshi	Indian National Congress	Lost
36	Rae Bareli	None	Sonia Gandhi	Indian National Congress	Won
37	Amethi	None	Rahul Gandhi	Indian National Congress	Won
38	Sultanpur	None	Amita Singh	Indian National Congress	Lost
39	Pratapgarh	None	Ratna Singh	Indian National Congress	Lost
40	Farrukhabad	None	Salman Khurshid	Indian National Congress	Lost
41	Etawah	SC	Hansmukhi Sankhwar	Indian National Congress	Lost
42	Kannauj	None	None		
43	Kanpur Urban	None	Shriprakash Jaiswal	Indian National Congress	Lost
44	Akbarpur	None	Raja Ram Pal	Indian National Congress	Lost
45	Jalaun	SC	Vijay Chaudhary	Indian National Congress	Lost
46	Jhansi	None	Pradeep Jain Aditya	Indian National Congress	Lost
47	Hamirpur	None	Preetam Singh	Indian National Congress	Lost
48	Banda	None	Vivek Singh	Indian National Congress	Lost
49	Fatehpur	None	Usha Maurya	Indian National Congress	Lost
50	Kaushambi	SC	Mahendra Gautam	Indian National Congress	Lost
51	Phulpur	None	Mohammad Kaif	Indian National Congress	Lost
52	Allahabad	None	Nand Copal Gupta "Nandi"	Indian National Congress	Lost
53	Barabanki	SC	P. L. Punia	Indian National Congress	Lost
54	Faizabad	None	Nirmal Khatri	Indian National Congress	Lost
55	Ambedkar Nagar	None	Ashok Singh	Indian National Congress	Lost
56	Bahraich	SC	Kamal Kishor	Indian National Congress	Lost
57	Kaiserganj	None	Mukesh Srivastava	Indian National Congress	Lost
58	Shrawasti	None	Vinay Kumar Pandey	Indian National Congress	Lost
59	Gonda	None	Beni Prasad Verma	Indian National Congress	Lost
60	Domariyaganj	None	Vasunhara Kumari	Indian National Congress	Lost
61	Basti	None	Sanjay Jaiswal	Indian National Congress	Lost
62	Sant Kabir Nagar	None	Rohit Pandey	Indian National Congress	Lost
63	Maharajganj	None	Harsh Vardhan	Indian National Congress	Lost
64	Gorakhpur	None	Ashtabhuja Tiwari	Indian National Congress	Lost
65	Kushi Nagar	None	R. P. N. Singh	Indian National Congress	Lost
66	Deoria	None	Sabha Kunwar Kushwaha	Indian National Congress	Lost
67	Bansgaon	SC	Sanjay Kumar	Indian National Congress	Lost
68	Lalganj	SC	Balibihari Babu	Indian National Congress	Lost
69	Azamgarh	None	Arvind Jaiswal	Indian National Congress	Lost
70	Ghosi	None	Rashtra Kunwar Singh	Indian National Congress	Lost
71	Salempur	None	Bhola Pandey	Indian National Congress	Lost
72	Ballia	None	Sudha Rai	Indian National Congress	Lost
73	Jaunpur	None	Ravi Kishan	Indian National Congress	Lost
74	Machhlishahr	SC	Tufani Nishad	Indian National Congress	Lost
75	Ghazipur	None	Mohd Maqsood Khan	Indian National Congress	Lost
76	Chandauli	None	Tarun Patel	Indian National Congress	Lost
77	Varanasi	None	Ajay Rai	Indian National Congress	Lost
78	Bhadohi	None	Sartaj Imam	Indian National Congress	Lost
79	Mirzapur	None	Lalitesh Pati Tripathi	Indian National Congress	Lost
80	Robertsganj	SC	Bhagwati Prasad Chaudhary	Indian National Congress	Lost

== Uttarakhand ==
INC (5)

Constituency No.	Constituency	Reserved for (SC/ST/None)	Candidate	Party	Result
1	Tehri Garhwal	None	Saket Bahuguna	Indian National Congress	Lost
2	Garhwal	None	Harak Singh Rawat	Indian National Congress	Lost
3	Almora	SC	Pradeep Tamta	Indian National Congress	Lost
4	Nainital–Udhamsingh Nagar	None	K. C. Singh Baba	Indian National Congress	Lost
5	Haridwar	None	Renuka Rawat	Indian National Congress	Lost

== West Bengal ==
INC (42)

Constituency No.	Constituency	Reserved for (SC/ST/None)	Candidate	Party	Result
1	Cooch Behar	SC	Keshab Ray	Indian National Congress	Lost
2	Alipurduars	ST	Josef Munda	Indian National Congress	Lost
3	Jalpaiguri	SC	Sukhbilas Verma	Indian National Congress	Lost
4	Darjeeling	None	Sujoy Ghatak	Indian National Congress	Lost
5	Raiganj	None	Deepa Dasmunshi	Indian National Congress	Lost
6	Balurghat	None	Om Prakash Mishra	Indian National Congress	Lost
7	Maldaha Uttar	None	Mausam Noor	Indian National Congress	Won
8	Maldaha Dakshin	None	Abu Hasem Khan Choudhury	Indian National Congress	Won
9	Jangipur	None	Abhijit Mukherjee	Indian National Congress	Won
10	Baharampur	None	Adhir Ranjan Chowdhury	Indian National Congress	Won
11	Murshidabad	None	Abdul Mannan Hossain	Indian National Congress	Lost
12	Krishnanagar	None	Razia Ahmed	Indian National Congress	Lost
13	Ranaghat	SC	Pratap Roy	Indian National Congress	Lost
14	Bangaon	SC	Ila Mandal	Indian National Congress	Lost
15	Barrackpur	None	Samrat Topedar	Indian National Congress	Lost
16	Dum Dum	None	Dhananjay Moitra	Indian National Congress	Lost
17	Barasat	None	Rizul Ghoshal	Indian National Congress	Lost
18	Basirhat	None	Quazi Abdul Rahim	Indian National Congress	Lost
19	Jaynagar	SC	Arnab Roy	Indian National Congress	Lost
20	Mathurapur	SC	Manoranjan Halder	Indian National Congress	Lost
21	Diamond Harbour	None	Mohmd Qumarhuzzan Qumar	Indian National Congress	Lost
22	Jadavpur	None	Samir Aich	Indian National Congress	Lost
23	Kolkata Dakshin	None	Mala Roy	Indian National Congress	Lost
24	Kolkata Uttar	None	Somendra Nath Mitra	Indian National Congress	Lost
25	Howrah	None	Manoj Kumar Pandey	Indian National Congress	Lost
26	Uluberia	None	Asit Mitra	Indian National Congress	Lost
27	Sreerampur	None	Abdul Mannan Hossain	Indian National Congress	Lost
28	Hooghly	None	Pritam Ghosh	Indian National Congress	Lost
29	Arambag	SC	Sambhu Nath Malik	Indian National Congress	Lost
30	Tamluk	None	Anwar Ali	Indian National Congress	Lost
31	Kanthi	None	Kunal Banerjee	Indian National Congress	Lost
32	Ghatal	None	Manas Bhunia	Indian National Congress	Lost
33	Jhargram	ST	Anita Hansdar	Indian National Congress	Lost
34	Medinipur	None	Bimal Raj	Indian National Congress	Lost
35	Purulia	None	Nepal Mahto	Indian National Congress	Lost
36	Bankura	None	Neel Madhava Gupta	Indian National Congress	Lost
37	Bishnupur	SC	Narayan Chander Khan	Indian National Congress	Lost
38	Bardhaman Purba	SC	Chandana Majhi	Indian National Congress	Lost
39	Bardhaman-Durgapur	None	Pradip Agasty	Indian National Congress	Lost
40	Asansol	None	Indrani Mishra	Indian National Congress	Lost
41	Bolpur	SC	Tapan Kumar Saha	Indian National Congress	Lost
42	Birbhum	None	Syed Siraj Jimmi	Indian National Congress	Lost

== Andaman and Nicobar Islands ==
INC (1)

Constituency No.	Constituency	Reserved for (SC/ST/None)	Candidate	Party	Result
1	Andaman and Nicobar Islands	None	Kuldeep Rai Sharma	Indian National Congress	Lost

== Chandigarh ==
INC (1)

Constituency No.	Constituency	Reserved for (SC/ST/None)	Candidate	Party	Result
1	Chandigarh	None	Pawan Kumar Bansal	Indian National Congress	Lost

== Dadra and Nagar Haveli ==
INC (1)

Constituency No.	Constituency	Reserved for (SC/ST/None)	Candidate	Party	Result
1	Dadra and Nagar Haveli	None	Mohanbhai Sanjibhai Delkar	Indian National Congress	Lost

== Daman and Diu ==
INC (1)

Constituency No.	Constituency	Reserved for (SC/ST/None)	Candidate	Party	Result
1	Daman and Diu	None	Dahyabhai Patel	Indian National Congress	Lost

== Lakshadweep ==
INC (1)

Constituency No.	Constituency	Reserved for (SC/ST/None)	Candidate	Party	Result
1	Lakshadweep	ST	Muhammed Hamdulla Sayeed	Indian National Congress	Lost

== NCT of Delhi ==
INC (7)

Constituency No.	Constituency	Reserved for (SC/ST/None)	Candidate	Party	Result
1	Chandni Chowk	None	Kapil Sibal	Indian National Congress	Lost
2	North East Delhi	None	Jai Prakash Agarwal	Indian National Congress	Lost
3	East Delhi	None	Sandeep Dikshit	Indian National Congress	Lost
4	New Delhi	None	Ajay Maken	Indian National Congress	Lost
5	North West Delhi	SC	Krishna Tirath	Indian National Congress	Lost
6	West Delhi	None	Mahabal Mishra	Indian National Congress	Lost
7	South Delhi	None	Ramesh Kumar	Indian National Congress	Lost

== Puducherry ==
INC (1)

Constituency No.	Constituency	Reserved for (SC/ST/None)	Candidate	Party	Result
1	Puducherry	None	V. Narayanasamy	Indian National Congress	Lost

== See also ==
List of United Progressive Alliance candidates in the 2009 Indian general election
List of United Progressive Alliance candidates in the 2014 Indian general election
List of United Progressive Alliance candidates in the 2019 Indian general election

- List of United Democratic Front candidates in the 2014 Indian general election
- List of National Democratic Alliance candidates in the 2014 Indian general election
- List of Left Democratic Front candidates in the 2014 Indian general election
- List of West Bengal Left Front candidates in the 2014 Indian general election
- Indian National Congress campaign for the 2014 Indian general election
