= List of leaders of the opposition in the Mizoram Legislative Assembly =

Mizoram LoP

Leader of the Opposition in the Mizoram Legislative Assembly
- Seal of the state of Mizoram

- Flag of India
- Incumbent; Lalchhandama Ralte since 5 December 2023
- Style: The Hon’ble
- Member of: Mizoram Legislative Assembly
- Nominator: Members of the Official Opposition of the Legislative Assembly
- Appointer: Speaker of the Assembly
- Term length: 5 years Till the Assembly Continues

The Leader of the Opposition in the Mizoram Legislative Assembly is the politician who leads the official opposition in the Mizoram Legislative Assembly in India.

== Eligibility ==
"Official Opposition" is a term used in Mizoram Legislative Assembly to designate the political party which has secured the second largest number of seats in the assembly. In order to get formal recognition, the party must have at least 10% of total membership of the Legislative Assembly.

== Role ==
In legislature, opposition party has a major role and must act to discourage the party in power from acting against the interests of the country and the common man. They are expected to alert the population and the Government on the content of any bill, which is not in the best interests of the country.

== List of leaders of the opposition ==
Name	Constituency	Tenure		Assembly	Chief Minister	Party
Lal Thanhawla	Serchhip	1987	1988	5th (1987 election)	Laldenga	Indian National Congress
Laldenga	Aizawl South II	1989	1993	6th (1989 election)	Lal Thanhawla	Mizo National Front
Zoramthanga	Champhai	1993	1998	7th (1993 election)	Lal Thanhawla	Mizo National Front
Lalhmingthanga	Aizawl East I	1999	2003	8th (1998 election)	Zoramthanga	Mizoram People's Conference
Lal Thanhawla	Serchhip	2003	2008	9th (2003 election)	Zoramthanga	Indian National Congress
R. Lalthangliana	Lunglei West	2008	2013	10th (2008 election)	Lal Thanhawla	Mizo National Front
Vanlalzawma	Aizawl West III	2013	2018	11th (2013 election)	Lal Thanhawla	Mizo National Front
Lalduhoma	Serchhip	2018	2020	12th (2018 election)	Zoramthanga	Zoram People's Movement
Lalduhoma	Serchhip	2021	2023	12th (2018 election)	Zoramthanga	Zoram People's Movement
Lalchhandama Ralte	Tuivawl	2023	Incumbent	13th (2023 election)	Lalduhoma	Mizo National Front

== See also ==
- Government of Mizoram
- Governor of Mizoram
- Chief Minister of Mizoram
- Mizoram Legislative Assembly
