= List of West Bengal Left Front candidates in the 2014 Indian general election =

For the 2014 Indian general election, the candidates for the Lok Sabha (lower house of the India parliament) of the West Bengal Left Front were as follows:

Constituency No.	Constituency	Reserved	Candidate	Party	Result
1	Cooch Behar	SC	Dipak Kumar Roy	All India Forward Bloc	Lost
2	Alipurduars	ST	Manohar Tirkey	Revolutionary Socialist Party	Lost
3	Jalpaiguri	SC	Mahendra Kumar Roy	Communist Party of India (Marxist)	Lost
4	Darjeeling	None	Saman Pathak	Communist Party of India (Marxist)	Lost
5	Raiganj	None	Mohammed Salim	Communist Party of India (Marxist)	Won
6	Balurghat	None	Bimal Sarkar	Revolutionary Socialist Party	Lost
7	Maldaha Uttar	None	Khagen Murmu	Communist Party of India (Marxist)	Lost
8	Maldaha Dakshin	None	Abul Hasnat Khan	Communist Party of India (Marxist)	Lost
9	Jangipur	None	Muzaffar Hossain	Communist Party of India (Marxist)	Lost
10	Baharampur	None	Pramathes Mukherjee	Revolutionary Socialist Party	Lost
11	Murshidabad	None	Badarudzza Khan	Communist Party of India (Marxist)	Won
12	Krishnanagar	None	Santanu Jha	Communist Party of India (Marxist)	Lost
13	Ranaghat	SC	Archna Biswas	Communist Party of India (Marxist)	Lost
14	Bangaon	SC	Debesh Das	Communist Party of India (Marxist)	Lost
15	Barrackpur	None	Subhashini Ali	Communist Party of India (Marxist)	Lost
16	Dum Dum	None	Asim Dasgupta	Communist Party of India (Marxist)	Lost
17	Barasat	None	Murtaza Hossen	All India Forward Bloc	Lost
18	Basirhat	None	Nurul Huda	Communist Party of India	Lost
19	Jaynagar	SC	Subhas Naskar	Revolutionary Socialist Party	Lost
20	Mathurapur	SC	Rinku Naskar	Communist Party of India (Marxist)	Lost
21	Diamond Harbour	None	Abul Hasnat	Communist Party of India (Marxist)	Lost
22	Jadavpur	None	Sujan Chakraborty	Communist Party of India (Marxist)	Lost
23	Kolkata Dakshin	None	Nandini Mukherjee	Communist Party of India (Marxist)	Lost
24	Kolkata Uttar	None	Rupa Bagchi	Communist Party of India (Marxist)	Lost
25	Howrah	None	Sreedip Bhattacharya	Communist Party of India (Marxist)	Lost
26	Uluberia	None	Sabiruddin Mollah	Communist Party of India (Marxist)	Lost
27	Sreerampur	None	Tirthankar Roy	Communist Party of India (Marxist)	Lost
28	Hooghly	None	Pradip Saha	Communist Party of India (Marxist)	Lost
29	Arambag	SC	Shakti Mohan Malik	Communist Party of India (Marxist)	Lost
30	Tamluk	None	Sk. Ibrahim Ali	Communist Party of India (Marxist)	Lost
31	Kanthi	None	Tapas Sinha	Communist Party of India (Marxist)	Lost
32	Ghatal	None	Santosh Rana	Communist Party of India	Lost
33	Jhargram	ST	Pulin Bihari Baske	Communist Party of India (Marxist)	Lost
34	Medinipur	None	Prabodh Panda	Communist Party of India	Lost
35	Purulia	None	Narahari Mahato	All India Forward Bloc	Lost
36	Bankura	None	Basudeb Acharia	Communist Party of India (Marxist)	Lost
37	Bishnupur	SC	Susmita Bauri	Communist Party of India (Marxist)	Lost
38	Bardhaman Purba	SC	Iswar Chandra Das	Communist Party of India (Marxist)	Lost
39	Bardhaman-Durgapur	None	Sk. Saidul Haque	Communist Party of India (Marxist)	Lost
40	Asansol	None	Bansa Gopal Chowdhury	Communist Party of India (Marxist)	Lost
41	Bolpur	SC	Ram Chandra Dome	Communist Party of India (Marxist)	Lost
42	Birbhum	None	Kamre Elahi	Communist Party of India (Marxist)	Lost

== See also ==
List of Left Democratic Front candidates in the 2014 Indian general election
List of West Bengal Left Front candidates in the 2014 Indian general election
List of Left Front candidates in the 2019 Indian general election
List of Left Front candidates in the 2024 Indian general election

- List of Left Democratic Front candidates in the 2014 Indian general election
- List of National Democratic Alliance candidates in the 2014 Indian general election
- List of United Progressive Alliance candidates in the 2014 Indian general election
- List of United Democratic Front candidates in the 2014 Indian general election
