= List of United Democratic Front candidates in the 2014 Indian general election =

For the 2014 Indian general election, the candidates for the 16th Lok Sabha (lower house of the India parliament) of the United Democratic Front of Kerala were as follows:

Constituency No.	Constituency	Reserved	Candidate	Party	Result
1	Kasaragod	None	T. Siddique	Indian National Congress	Lost
2	Kannur	None	K. Sudhakaran	Indian National Congress	Lost
3	Vatakara	None	Mullappally Ramachandran	Indian National Congress	Won
4	Wayanad	None	M. I. Shanavas	Indian National Congress	Won
5	Kozhikode	None	M. K. Raghavan	Indian National Congress	Won
6	Malappuram	None	E. Ahammed	Indian Union Muslim League	Won
7	Ponnani	None	E. T. Muhammed Basheer	Indian Union Muslim League	Won
8	Palakkad	None	M. P. Veerendrakumar	Socialist Janata (Democratic)	Lost
9	Alathur	SC	Sheeba	Indian National Congress	Lost
10	Thrissur	None	K. P. Dhanapalan	Indian National Congress	Lost
11	Chalakudy	None	P. C. Chacko	Indian National Congress	Lost
12	Ernakulam	None	K. V. Thomas	Indian National Congress	Won
13	Idukki	None	Dean Kuriakose	Indian National Congress	Lost
14	Kottayam	None	Jose K. Mani	Kerala Congress (M)	Won
15	Alappuzha	None	K. C. Venugopal	Indian National Congress	Won
16	Mavelikara	SC	Kodikkunnil Suresh	Indian National Congress	Won
17	Pathanamthitta	None	Anto Antony Punnathaniyil	Indian National Congress	Won
18	Kollam	None	N. K. Premachandran	Revolutionary Socialist Party	Won
19	Attingal	None	Bindu Krishna	Indian National Congress	Lost
20	Thiruvananthapuram	None	Shashi Tharoor	Indian National Congress	Won

== See also ==
- List of National Democratic Alliance candidates in the 2014 Indian general election
- List of United Progressive Alliance candidates in the 2014 Indian general election
- List of Left Democratic Front candidates in the 2014 Indian general election
- List of West Bengal Left Front candidates in the 2014 Indian general election
