= List of Left Democratic Front candidates in the 2024 Indian general election =

The Left Democratic Front (LDF) also known as Left Front (Kerala) is an alliance of centre-left to left-wing political parties in the state of Kerala, India. It is the current ruling political alliance of Kerala, since 2016. It is one of the two major political alliances in Kerala, the other being Indian National Congress-led United Democratic Front.

== Seat Sharing Arrangement ==
Party		Symbol	Leader(s)	Seats contested
Communist Party of India (Marxist)	CPI(M)		M.V. Govindan	TBD
Communist Party of India	CPI		Binoy Vishwam	TBD
Kerala Congress (M)	KC(M)		Jose K. Mani	TBD

== Candidates ==
Constituency No.	Constituency	Reserved	Candidate	Party	Result
1	Kasaragod	None	TBD	TBD	TBD
2	Kannur	None	TBD	CPI(M)	TBD
3	Vatakara	None	TBD	TBD	TBD
4	Wayanad	None	Annie Raja	Communist Party of India	TBD
5	Kozhikode	None	TBD	TBD	TBD
6	Malappuram	None	TBD	TBD	TBD
7	Ponnani	None	TBD	TBD	TBD
8	Palakkad	None	TBD	TBD	TBD
9	Alathur	SC	TBD	CPI(M)	TBD
10	Thrissur	None	VS Sunil Kumar	Communist Party of India	TBD
11	Chalakudy	None	TBD	TBD	TBD
12	Ernakulam	None	TBD	CPI(M)	TBD
13	Idukki	None	TBD	TBD	TBD
14	Kottayam	None	Thomas Chazhikkadan	KC(M)	TBD
15	Alappuzha	None	TBD	CPI(M)	TBD
16	Mavelikara	SC	C A Arunkumar	Communist Party of India	TBD
17	Pathanamthitta	None	T M Thomas Issac	CPI(M)	TBD
18	Kollam	None	M Mukesh	CPI(M)	TBD
19	Attingal	None	TBD	TBD	TBD
20	Thiruvananthapuram	None	Pannian Raveendran	Communist Party of India	TBD
