= Kunhome =

- town
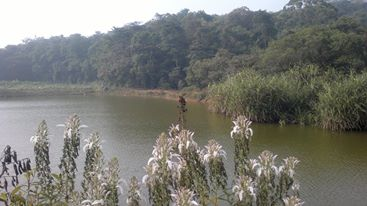
- kunhome
- Interactive map of Kunhome
- Country: India
- State: Kerala
- District: wayanad

Languages
  - Official: Malayalam, English
- Time zone: UTC+5:30 (IST)
- PIN: 670731
- Vehicle registration: KL-12,72

Kunhome is a small village situated in Thondernadu Panchayath, Wayanad district, Kerala, India. It has a diverse cultural heritage. Kunhome is a hub for domestic and international tourists. The village has a distinct identity in tourist destinations of Wayanad due to its historical and cultural heritage.

== Transportation ==
Kunhome can be accessed from Mananthavady or Kalpetta. The Periya ghat road connects Mananthavady to Kannur and Thalassery. The Thamarassery mountain road connects Calicut with Kalpetta. The Kuttiady mountain road connects Vatakara with Kalpetta and Mananthavady. The Palchuram mountain road connects Kannur and Iritty with Mananthavady. The road from Nilambur to Ooty is also connected to Wayanad through the village of Meppadi.

The nearest railway station is at Mysore and the nearest airports are Kozhikode International Airport-120 km, Bengaluru International Airport-290 km, and Kannur International Airport, 58 km.

== Notable People ==
- Syamjith V A - The founder of "Vaashikku Smash" philosophy.
