= Tuivawl Assembly constituency =

Legislative assembly constituency in Mizoram, India

Coordinates: 24.155008°N 92.963486°E

Tuivawl
- Constituency No. 7 for the Mizoram Legislative Assembly
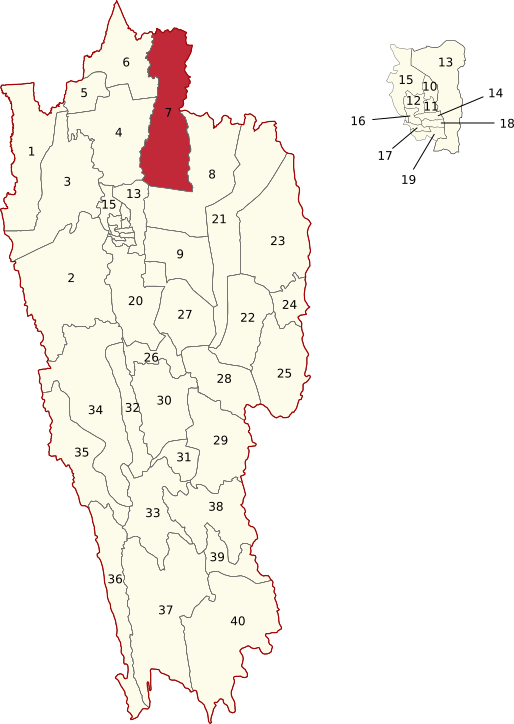

Constituency details
- Country: India
- Region: Northeast India
- State: Mizoram
- District: Aizawl
- Lok Sabha constituency: Mizoram
- Established: 2008
- Total electors: 14,922
- Reservation: ST

Member of Legislative Assembly
- 9th Mizoram Legislative Assembly
- Incumbent Lalchhandama Ralte
- Party: Mizo National Front
- Elected year: 2023

Tuivawl is one of the 40 Legislative Assembly constituencies of Mizoram state in India.

It is part of Aizawl district and is reserved for candidates belonging to the Scheduled Tribes.

== Members of the Legislative Assembly ==
Year	Member	Party
2008	R. L. Pianmawia	Indian National Congress
2013	R. L. Pianmawia	Indian National Congress
2018	Lalchhandama Ralte	Mizo National Front
2023	Lalchhandama Ralte	Mizo National Front

== Election results ==
=== 2023 ===
2023 Mizoram Legislative Assembly election: Tuivawl
Party	Candidate	Votes	%	±%
MNF	Lalchhandama Ralte	6,501	44.18	▲4.77
ZPM	JMS Dawngliana	30.46	30.46	
INC	R. L. Pianmawia	3,590	24.40	▼14.99
BJP	K Changliana	82	0.56	
NOTA	None of the Above	61	0.41	
Majority		2,911	13.68	
Turnout				
MNF hold		Swing		

=== 2018 ===
2018 Mizoram Legislative Assembly election: Tuivawl
Party	Candidate	Votes	%	±%
MNF	Lalchhandama Ralte	5,207	39.41	▲4.99
INC	R. L. Pianmawia	5204	39.39	▼6.02
BJP	Judy Zohmingliani	1607	12.16	▲11.66
ZPM	K. Romawia	1083	8.20	▼11.12
Independent	H. K. Hlimpawlthanga	58	0.44	New
NOTA	None of the Above	52	0.39	▲0.05
Majority		3	0.03	
Turnout		13,211	80.69	▼2.04
MNF gain from INC		Swing		

=== 2013 ===
2013 Mizoram Legislative Assembly election: Tuivawl
Party	Candidate	Votes	%	±%
INC	R. L. Pianmawia	5,668	45.41	▲8.72
MNF	Gogo Lalremtluanga	4297	34.42	▲1.78
ZNP	Lalmuanpuia Punte	2412	19.32	▼8.33
BJP	C. Ramkinlova	63	0.50	▼1.50
NOTA	None of the Above	43	0.34	New
Majority		1371	11.02	
Turnout		12483	82.73	▲1.13
INC hold		Swing		

=== 2008 ===
2008 Mizoram Legislative Assembly election: Tuivawl
Party	Candidate	Votes	%	±%
INC	R. L. Pianmawia	4,276	36.69	
MNF	Gogo Lalremtluanga	3803	32.64	
ZNP	Lalduhoma	3222	27.65	
BJP	Lalhualthanga	233	2.00	
LJP	Lalrinawma	67	0.57	
LB	Lalrosema	52	0.45	
Majority		473	4.06	
Turnout		11653	81.6	
INC win (new seat)				
