= V. Vaseef =

Indian Politician

President of the Democratic Youth Federation of India Kerala State
- Incumbent
- Assumed office 30 April 2022–present

Personal details
- Born: Kozhikode, Kerala, India
- Party: Communist Party of India (Marxist)
- Spouse: Arshitha
- Education: SNG College Chelannur (MEd); MAMO College Manassery; Farook College
- Occupation: Teacher; Politician

Valappil Vaseef better known as V. Vaseef is an Indian politician and state president of DYFI Kerala. He is a Commerce teacher of Fathimabi Memorial HSS Koombara, Kozhikode, Kerala. He was elected DYFI Kerala State President in April 2022.

== Personal life ==
He is born to Valappil Veeran Kutty and Vaheeda and married to Arshitha.

== See also ==
- Communist Party of India (Marxist), Kerala
