= Lalchhandama Ralte =

Indian politician

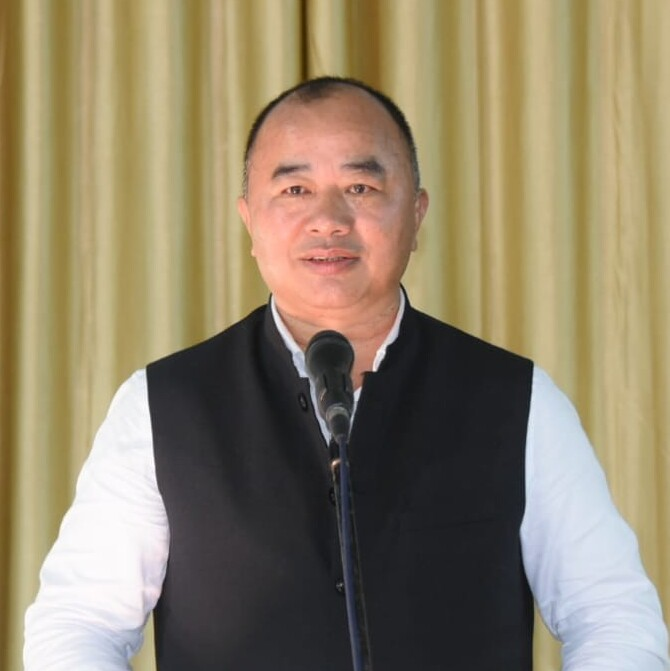
- Lalchhandama Ralte in 2023

Leader of the Opposition in the Mizoram Legislative Assembly
- Incumbent
- Assumed office 5 December 2023
- Governor: V. K. Singh
- Chief Minister: Lalduhoma
- Speaker: Lalbiakzama
- Preceded by: Lalduhoma

Minister of School Education of Mizoram
- In office 15 December 2018 – 3 December 2023
- Governor: P. S. Sreedharan Pillai; Kambhampati Hari Babu
- Chief Minister: Zoramthanga
- Preceded by: H Rohluna
- Succeeded by: Vanlalthlana

Minister of Printing and Stationery of Mizoram
- In office 15 December 2018 – 3 December 2023
- Governor: P. S. Sreedharan Pillai; Kambhampati Hari Babu
- Chief Minister: Zoramthanga
- Preceded by: C. Ngunlianchunga
- Succeeded by: F. Rodingliana

Minister of Labour, Employment, Skill Development and Entrepreneurship of Mizoram
- In office 15 December 2018 – 3 December 2023
- Governor: P. S. Sreedharan Pillai; Kambhampati Hari Babu
- Chief Minister: Zoramthanga
- Preceded by: Lal Thanzara
- Succeeded by: Lalnghinglova Hmar

Member of the Mizoram Legislative Assembly
- Incumbent
- Assumed office December 2018
- Preceded by: R. L. Pianmawia
- Constituency: Tuivawl

Personal details
- Born: 11 March 1972 (age 54)
- Party: Mizo National Front (since 2013)
- Spouse: Flora Rosangpuii
- Children: 5
- Parent: Rev. R.B. Laitawia (father)
- Education: North-Eastern Hill University

Lalchhandama Ralte is a Mizo National Front politician from Mizoram. He has been elected to the Mizoram Legislative Assembly from the Tuivawl Assembly constituency. He is currently the leader of opposition in the Mizoram Legislative Assembly and also the legislative leader of Mizo National Front party.

== Career ==
Lalchhandama Ralte was the School Education, labour, employment and skill development, entrepreneurship and printing and stationery departments Minister under the Third Zoramthanga ministry from 2018 to 2023.

== Education ==
He completed his M.A. degree in Political Science at NEHU, Shillong in 1998.
