= List of current governing and opposition parties in India =

List of governing political parties in Indian states and union-territories

Presented below is the list of the current governing and opposition parties in the States and Union Territories of India.

== State Legislative Assembly ==
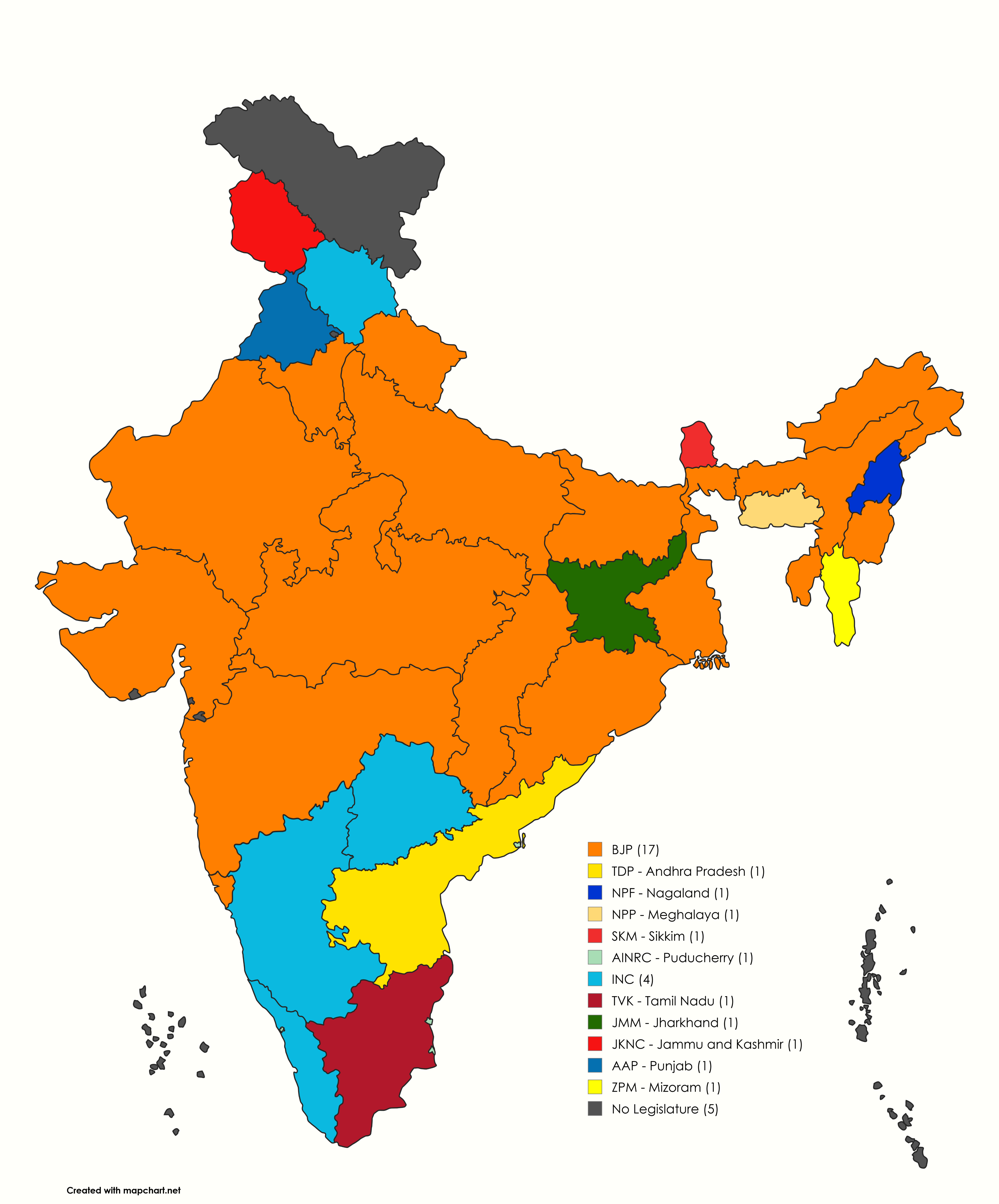
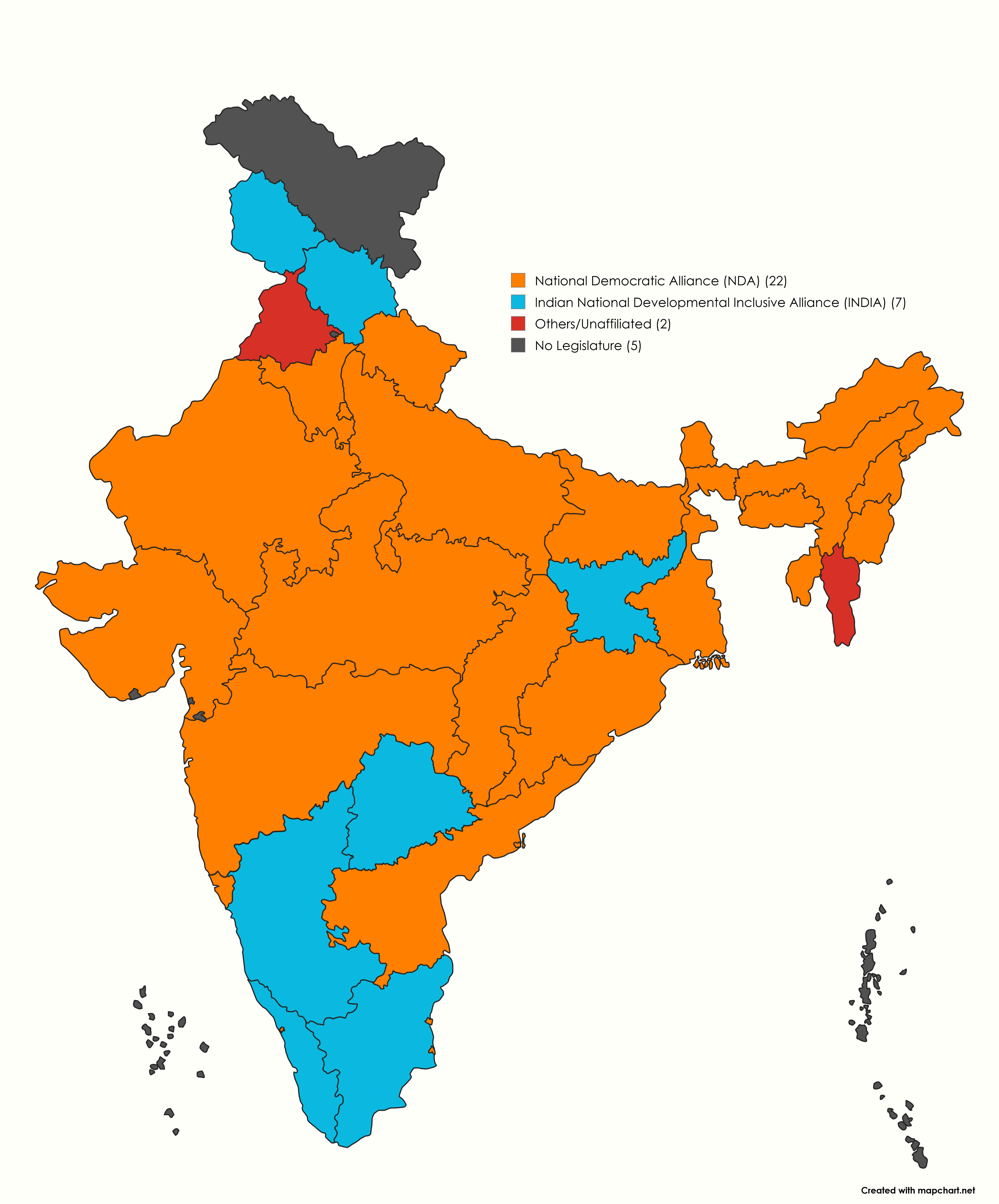

| # | State / Union Territory | Governing Party | Governing Alliance | Official Opposition | Opposition Alliance | Other Opposition | Latest election |
|---|---|---|---|---|---|---|---|
| 1 | Andhra Pradesh | TDP | NDA | Vacant (Note: No party secured 10% of seats to form official opposition.) | | YSRCP | 2024 |
| 2 | Arunachal Pradesh | BJP | NDA | Vacant | | INDIA | 2024 |
| 3 | Assam | BJP | NDA | INC | INDIA | AIUDF | 2026 |
| 4 | Bihar | BJP | NDA | RJD | INDIA | AIMIM | 2025 |
| 5 | Chhattisgarh | BJP | NDA | INC | INDIA | GGP | 2023 |
| 6 | Goa | BJP | NDA | INC | INDIA | RGP | 2022 |
| 7 | Gujarat | BJP | NDA | Vacant | | INDIA | 2022 |
| 8 | Haryana | BJP | NDA | INC | INDIA | INLD | 2024 |
| 9 | Himachal Pradesh | INC | INDIA | BJP | NDA | N/A | 2022 |
| 10 | Jharkhand | JMM | INDIA | BJP | NDA | JLKM | 2024 |
| 11 | Karnataka | INC | INDIA | BJP | NDA | N/A | 2023 |
| 12 | Kerala | INC | UDF (INDIA) | CPI(M) | LDF (INDIA) | NDA | 2026 |
| 13 | Madhya Pradesh | BJP | NDA | INC | INDIA | | 2023 |
| 14 | Maharashtra | BJP | NDA | Vacant | | INDIA | 2024 |
| 15 | Manipur | BJP | NDA | Vacant | | INDIA | 2022 |
| 16 | Meghalaya | NPP | NDA | AITC | INDIA | N/A | 2023 |
| 17 | Mizoram | ZPM | None | MNF | None | BJP | 2023 |
| 17 | Mizoram | ZPM | None | MNF | None | INDIA | 2023 |
| 18 | Nagaland | NPF | NDA | Vacant (Note: There is no opposition in Nagaland as all parties are part of PDA.) | | | 2023 |
| 19 | Odisha | BJP | NDA | BJD | None | INDIA | 2024 |
| 20 | Punjab | AAP | None | INC | INDIA | BJP | 2022 |
| 20 | Punjab | AAP | None | INC | INDIA | BSP | 2022 |
| 21 | Rajasthan | BJP | NDA | INC | INDIA | N/A | 2023 |
| 22 | Sikkim | SKM | NDA | Vacant (Note: All seats belong to the governing Sikkim Krantikari Morcha.) | | | 2024 |
| 23 | Tamil Nadu | TVK | INDIA | DMK | None | | |
| 23 | Tamil Nadu | TVK | INDIA | DMK | None | AIADMK | 2026 |
| 23 | Tamil Nadu | TVK | INDIA | DMK | None | AMMK | 2026 |
| 23 | Tamil Nadu | TVK | INDIA | DMK | None | BJP | 2026 |
| 23 | Tamil Nadu | TVK | INDIA | DMK | None | PMK | 2026 |
| 24 | Telangana | INC | INDIA | BRS | None | BJP | 2023 |
| 24 | Telangana | INC | INDIA | BRS | None | AIMIM | 2023 |
| 25 | Tripura | BJP | NDA | CPI(M) | INDIA | N/A | 2023 |
| 26 | Uttarakhand | BJP | NDA | INC | INDIA | BSP | 2022 |
| 27 | Uttar Pradesh | BJP | NDA | SP | INDIA | JD(L) | 2022 |
| 28 | West Bengal | BJP | NDA | DTC | None | INC | 2026 |
| 28 | West Bengal | BJP | NDA | DTC | None | AJUP | 2026 |
| 28 | West Bengal | BJP | NDA | DTC | None | LF+ | 2026 |
| 29 | Delhi | BJP | NDA | AAP | None | N/A | 2025 |
| 30 | Puducherry | AINRC | NDA | DMK | None | TVK | 2026 |
| 31 | Jammu and Kashmir | JKNC | INDIA | BJP | NDA | JKPDP | 2024 |

== State Legislative Council ==
| S.No 01 | State | Governing Party / Governing Alliance | Opposition Party / Opposition Alliance | Other Parties |
|---|---|---|---|---|
| 1 | Andhra Pradesh | TDP+JSP+BJP | YSRCP | |
| 2 | Bihar | BJP+JD(U)+HAM(S)+RLJP | RJD+INC+CPI (MGB) | |
| 3 | Karnataka | INC | BJP+JD(S) (NDA) | |
| 4 | Maharashtra | BJP + SHS + NCP +RPI (NDA) | Vacant | SS (UBT) + INC + NCP (SP) (MVA) |
| 5 | Telangana | INC | BRS | BJP |
| 6 | Uttar Pradesh | BJP+AD(S) | SP | |

- As 2 February 2024 NDA have power in 4 state legislative council out of 6, whereas INDIA Alliance bloc have power in 2 state legislative council.
