= Mukkam Muslim Orphanage =

Orphanage in Mukkam, Kerala, India

Coordinates: 11.321973°N 75.935386°E

- Type: Education
- Established: 1956
- Location: Calicut, Kerala, India
- Website: www.mmomukkam.org

Mukkam Muslim Orphanage (MMO) is an educational institute established in 1956 in Mukkam, Kerala, India, in the valley of the Western Ghats, about 35 km north east of Calicut. MMO now manages 28 facilities. It won the Indian government's National Award for Child Welfare in 1982 and 2008.

== History ==
The first MMO facility was established in 1956 by the Vayalil family, who donated some of their land for an orphanage to educate and train poor, orphaned and destitute children. The first facility had 22 residents when it was opened.

The Mukkam Muslim Orphanage (MMO) has been awarded the National Child Welfare Award by the Government of India twice, in 1982 and 2008. In 2009, the orphanage won the Foundation Award, awarded annually by the Mohammedan Educational Association in Calicut to an educational institute which makes a significant contribution to society.

In 2011, MMO alumnus Mohammed Ali Shihab secured an All India Rank of 226th in the Civil Services Examination.
