= A. Vijayaraghavan =

Indian politician

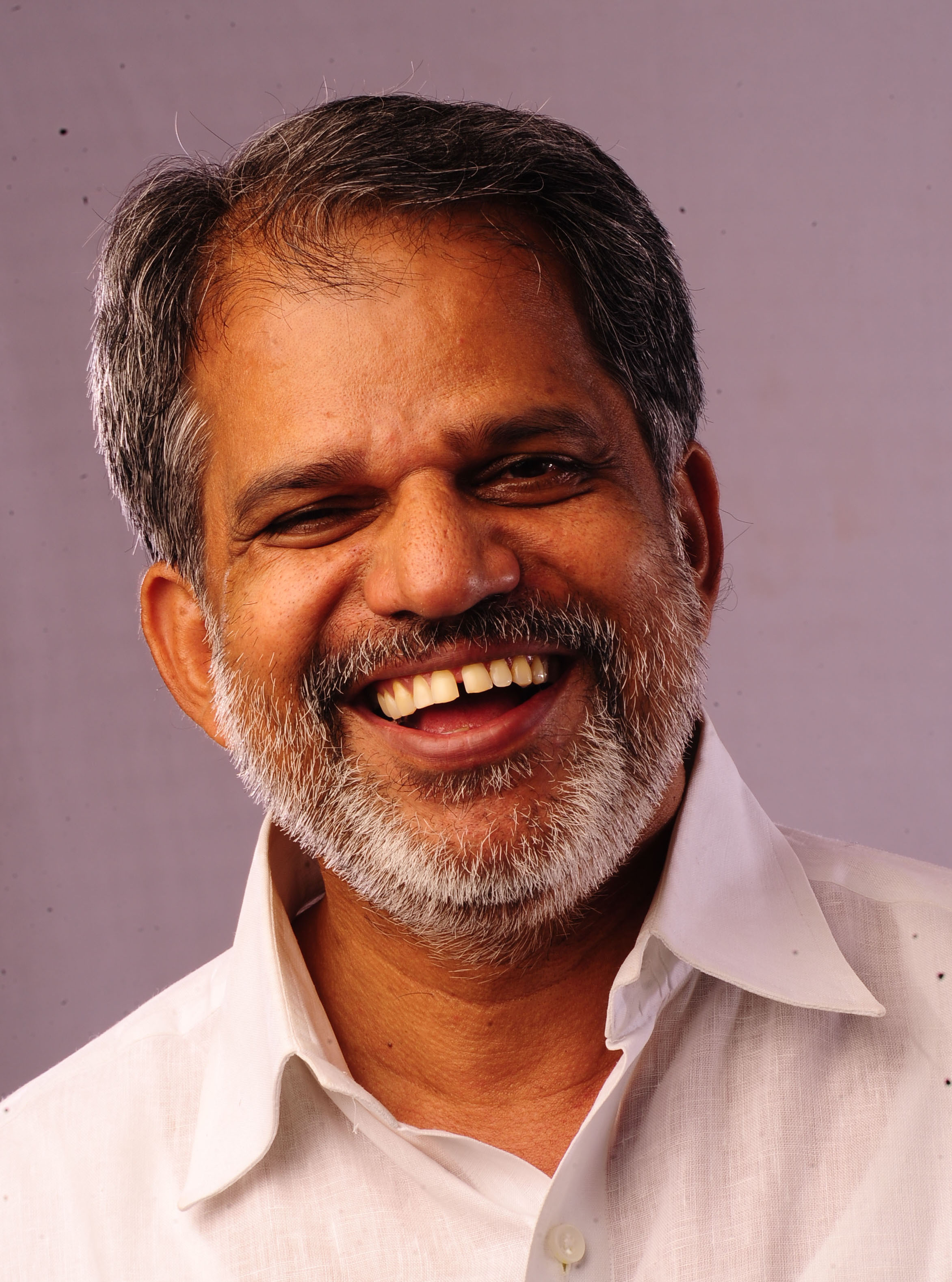

Polit Bureau Member, Communist Party of India (Marxist)
- Incumbent
- Assumed office 10 April 2022

President, All India Agricultural Workers Union
- Incumbent
- Assumed office 2022

Personal details
- Born: Malappuram, Kerala, India
- Party: Communist Party of India (Marxist)
- Spouse: R. Bindu
- Education: Government Law College, Kozhikode

A. Vijayaraghavan is an Indian politician belonging to the Communist Party of India (Marxist), and was the Convener of Left Democratic Front in Kerala and former Acting Secretary of CPI(M) Kerala State Committee. He was born at Malappuram district. He was a Member of the Parliament of India representing Kerala in the Rajya Sabha, the upper house of the Parliament. He was the chairman of parliamentary committees on Subordinate Legislation and General Assurances. He was also the Chief Whip of CPI(M) in the Rajya Sabha. He was elected to the Lok Sabha from Palakkad Lok Sabha constituency in 1989. He is the Central Secretariat member of CPI(M) and General Secretary of All India Agricultural Workers Union. He served as the ad-hoc Secretary of CPI(M), Kerala during the 2022 elections.

He contested in 2014 Indian general election from Kozhikode Lok Sabha constituency. He has also got a Bachelor of Laws degree from Government Law College, Kozhikode. He is married to Prof. R. Bindu, who is herself a popular party worker, Minister of Higher Education and Social Justice Govt of Kerala, former mayor of Thrishur Municipal Corporation, and retired teacher in Sree Kerala Varma College, Thrissur. He lives in Thrissur. He has also served as the president of the Students Federation of India. He is also the director of the Malayalam Communications Limited. He was also a member of the Indian contingent for the General Assembly of the United Nations. He is currently serving as the All India General Secretary of the All India Agricultural Workers Union.

== Electoral History ==
=== Rajya Sabha ===
Position	Party	Constituency	From	To	Tenure
Member of Parliament, Rajya Sabha (1st Term)	CPI(M)	Kerala	3 April 1998	2 April 2004	5 years, 365 days
Member of Parliament, Rajya Sabha (2nd Term)	CPI(M)	Kerala	3 April 2004	2 April 2010	5 years, 364 days
