= Elamaram =

- Village
- Interactive map of Elamaram
- Coordinates: 11°15′33″N 75°57′58″E
- Country: India
- State: Kerala
- District: Malappuram

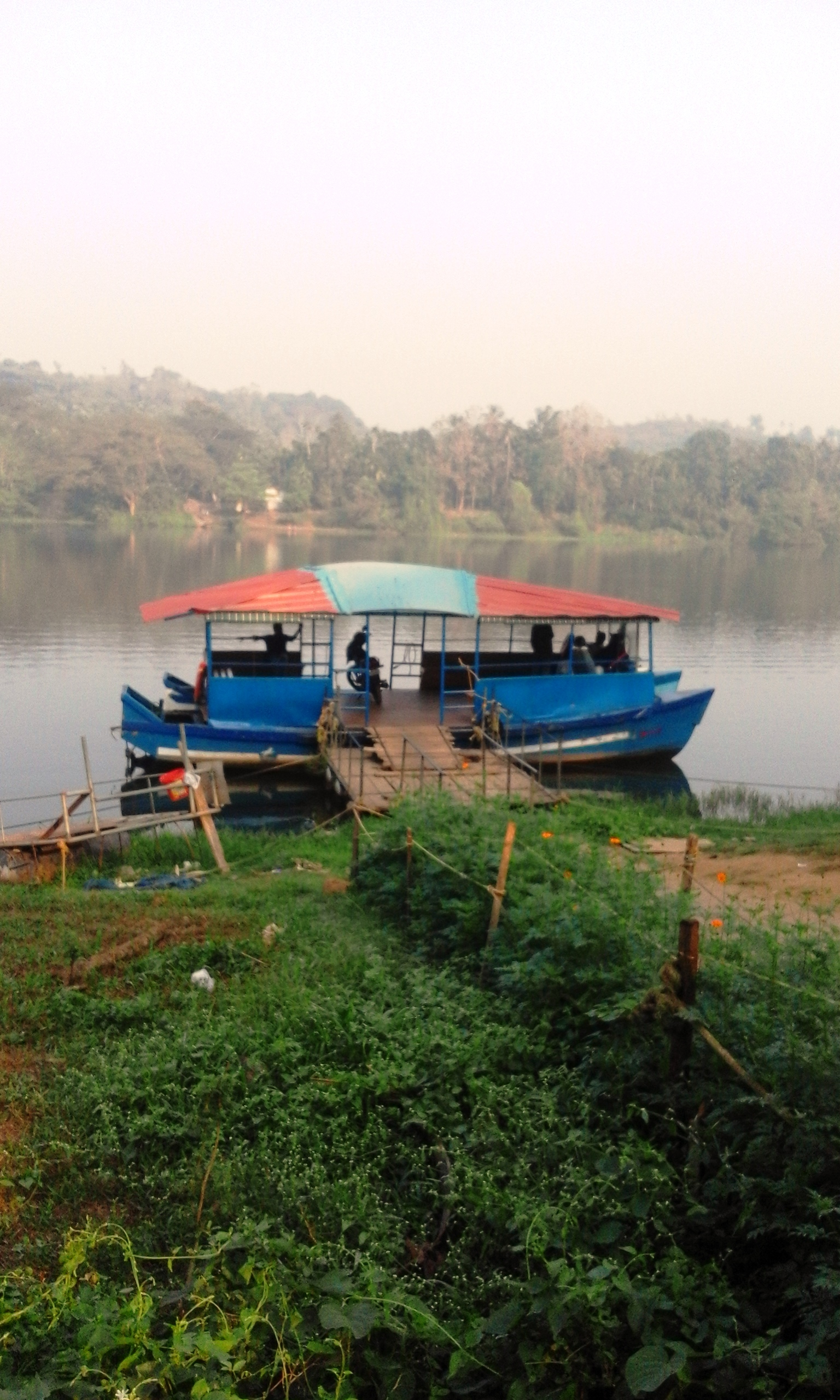
Elamaram Jetty

Elamaram is a village in the Indian state of Kerala. It is situated near Edavannappara in Malappuram district. This village is on the bank of the Chaliyar river.

== Ghost Town ==
Across the river Chaliyar lies the abandoned Industries factory named "'Gwalior Rayons'" (later renamed as Grasim) which once employed 2,000 employees. Environmental agitations in 1998 under the leadership of K. A. Rahman caused the closure of the factory and the entire village went bankrupt because of the sudden development and eleven people even committed suicide because of not being able to face unexpected poverty.

The resort Chaliyar Jalak looks like an abandoned place like the Grasim Factory nearby. Even though there are many rooms and a river side picnic space with tiled footpaths, there is no maintenance of any sort.

== Shopping ==
In the nearby town of Edavannappara, there are shopping facilities such as the MC Mall in the heart of the town. There are also many theme restaurants here.

== Pilgrimage ==
The Konnara Dargah is three kilometres away from Elamaram on the bank of the Chaliyar river. It is the holy resting place of a Muslim saint where hundreds of pilgrims visit regularly.

== Nearby villages ==
Edavannappara, Pancheeri, Palakkd, Mapram, Konnar, Vettathur, Cheruvadikavu, Kottupadam, Kakkov, Channayil Palliyali, Akode, Virippadam, Oorkkadavu, Korappadam, Mundumuzhi, Vazhakkad, Valillappuzha, Vazhakkad, Kondotty, Neerad, Muthuvalloor, Moochikal, Mundakkulam, Muthuparamba Road, Vettukad, Omanoor, Ponnad, Iruppanthody Karatt Chola Kolambalam

== Transportation ==
Elamaram village connects to other parts of India through Kondotty town on the west and Nilambur town on the east. National highway No.66 passes through Kondotty and the northern stretch connects to Goa and Mumbai. The southern stretch connects to Cochin and Trivandrum. State Highway No.28 starts from Nilambur and connects to Ooty, Mysore and Bangalore through Highways 12, 29 and 181. The nearest airport is at Kozhikode, and the nearest major railway station is at Feroke.

There is a ferry service here that takes passengers to the northern side of the Chaliyar river. The ticket is Rs.5.00 and the motor boat service is available every half an hour between 6.40 a.m. and 8.40 p.m. including Sundays.

== See also ==
- Elamaram Kareem
- Vazhakkad
- Edavannappara
