= Omanoor =

- village
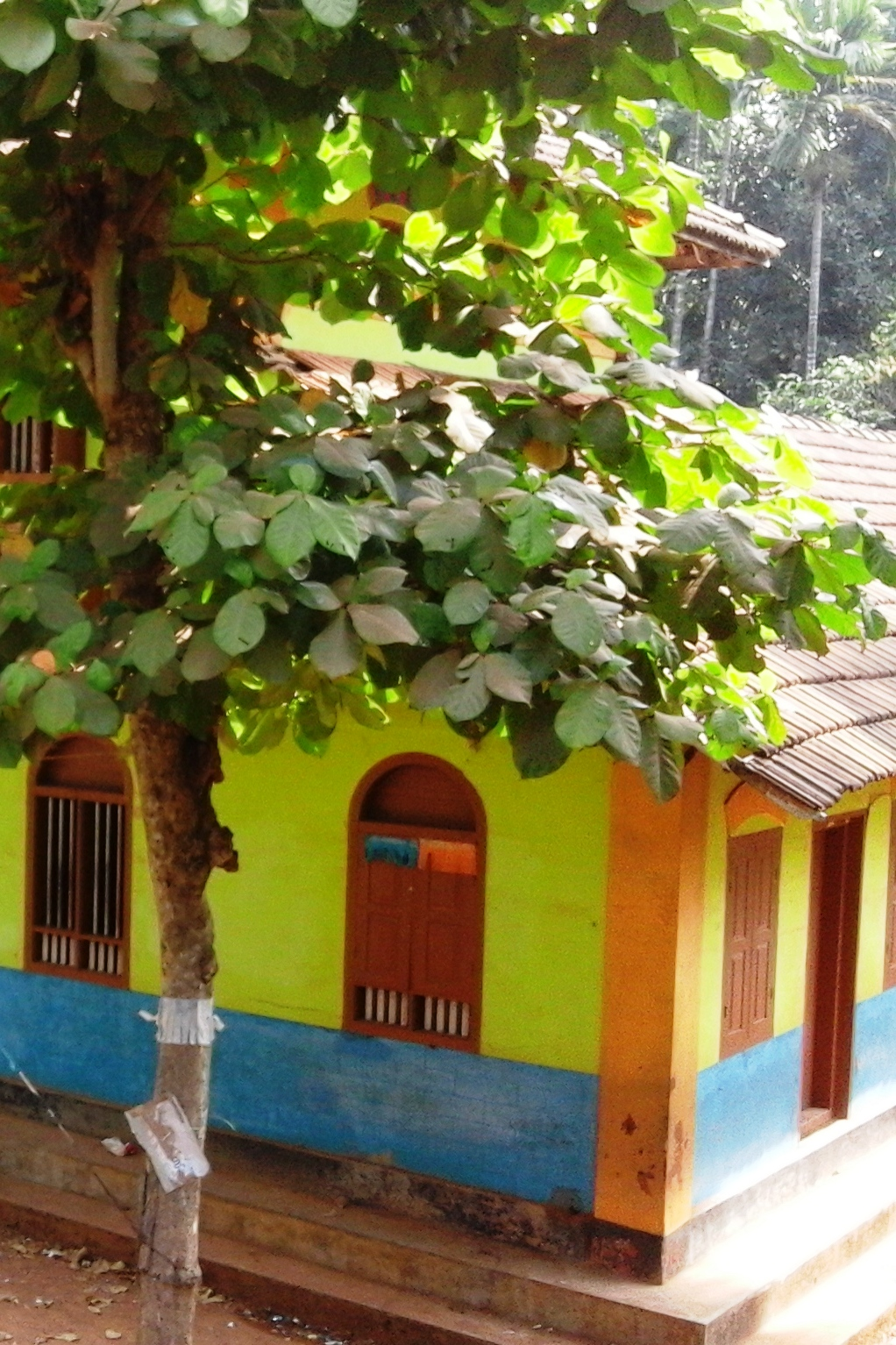
- Old building of Mansha'ul Uloom Arabic College, Omanoor.
- Interactive map of Omanoor
- Coordinates: 11°13′0″N 75°58′0″E
- Country: India
- State: Kerala
- District: Malappuram
- Talukas: kondotty

Languages
  - Official: Malayalam, English
- Time zone: UTC+5:30 (IST)
- PIN: 673645
- Nearest city: Kondotty
- Literacy: 100%%
- Lok Sabha constituency: Malappuram
- Vidhan Sabha constituency: Kondotty

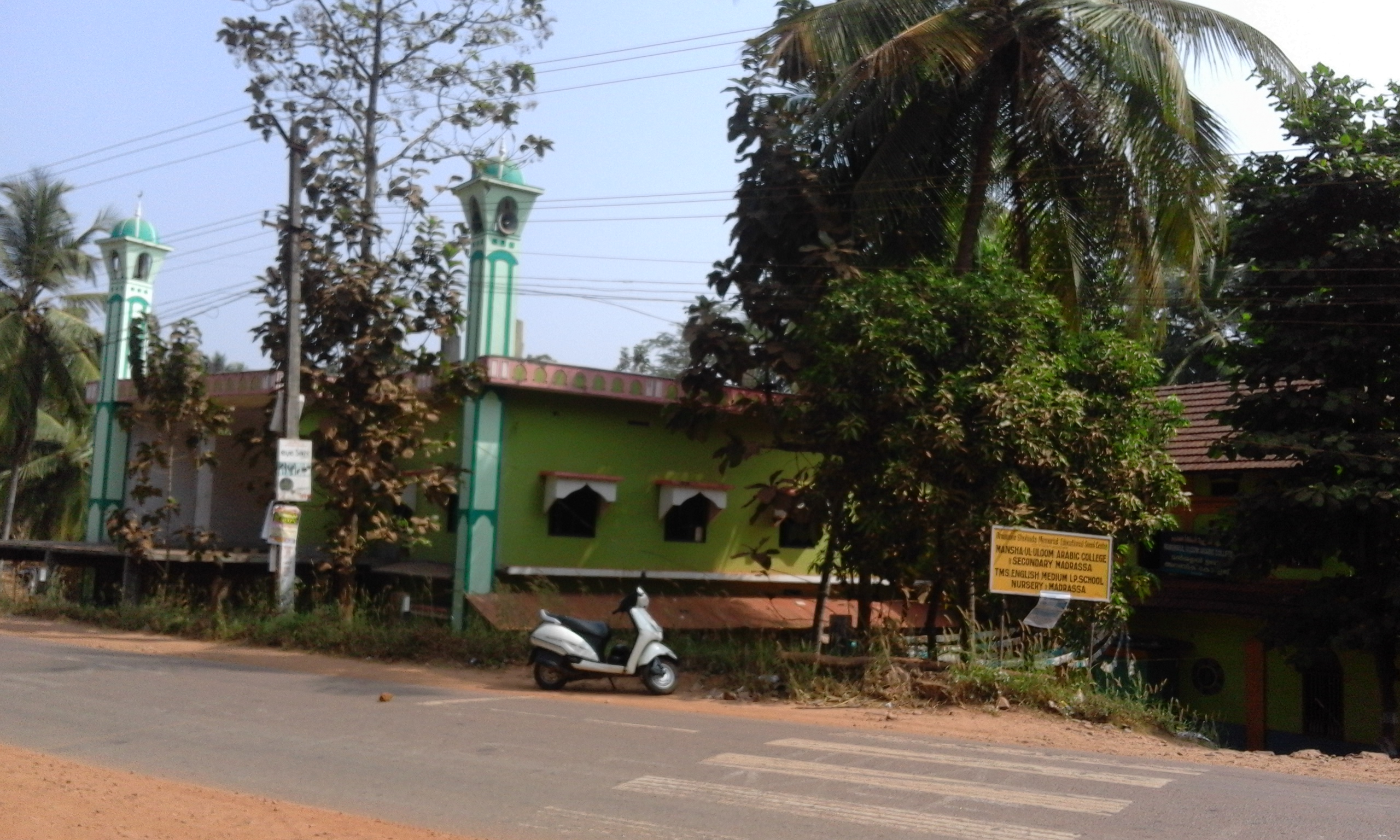
Masjidh in Mansha' Campus, Omanoor

Omanoor is a village in the Malappuram district, Kerala, India. The village is in Cheekode Panchayath. There have LP, UP, HSS in this village, and most of the people are daily workers. Omanoor has many historical mythologies.

== Location ==
Omanoor is located on the main road from Kondotty to Edavannappara.

== Villages and suburbs ==
- Neerad, Muthuvalloor and Moochikkal
- Jalaliyya Nagar, Mundakkulam and Vettukadu
- Parathakkad, Cheekkode and Pallipuraya
- Kacherithadam, Ponnad and Kolambalam

== Important institutions in Omanoor ==
1. Brothers kodakkad, omanoor
2. Omanoor Suhada Islamic Complex(https://www.facebook.com/shuhadaomanoor/)
3. Govt. vetinery Hospital
4. Govt. Primary Health Centre
5. Govt. Vocational Higher Secondary school
6. Village Office
7. Govt. Homeo Hospital
8. Maveli store
9. Kerala Gramin Bank
10. Cheekode service cooperative bank
11. Misriya women's college, Omanur
12. AMLPS omanur
13. UAHMUPS Omanur
14. TMSEM LPS Omanur
15. Brothers Kodakkad Arts and Sports club

== Transportation ==
Omanoor village connects to other parts of India through Feroke town on the west and Nilambur town on the east. National highway No.66 passes through Kondotty and the northern stretch connects to Goa and Mumbai. The southern stretch connects to Cochin and Trivandrum. State Highway No.28 starts from Nilambur and connects to Ooty, Mysore and Bangalore through Highways.12,29 and 181. The nearest airport is at Kozhikode. There is no railway station near to omanoor in less than 10 km. However Kozhikode and Feroke are major railway stations which are almost 22 km from Omanoor.

Nearest Bus station Kondotty. and Edavannappara

Airport: Calicut international airport is 10KMs Away from Omanoor

== See also ==
- Kondotty
- Mukkam
- Mavoor
- Edavannappara
- Edavanna
- Areekode
- kodakkad

== Image gallery ==
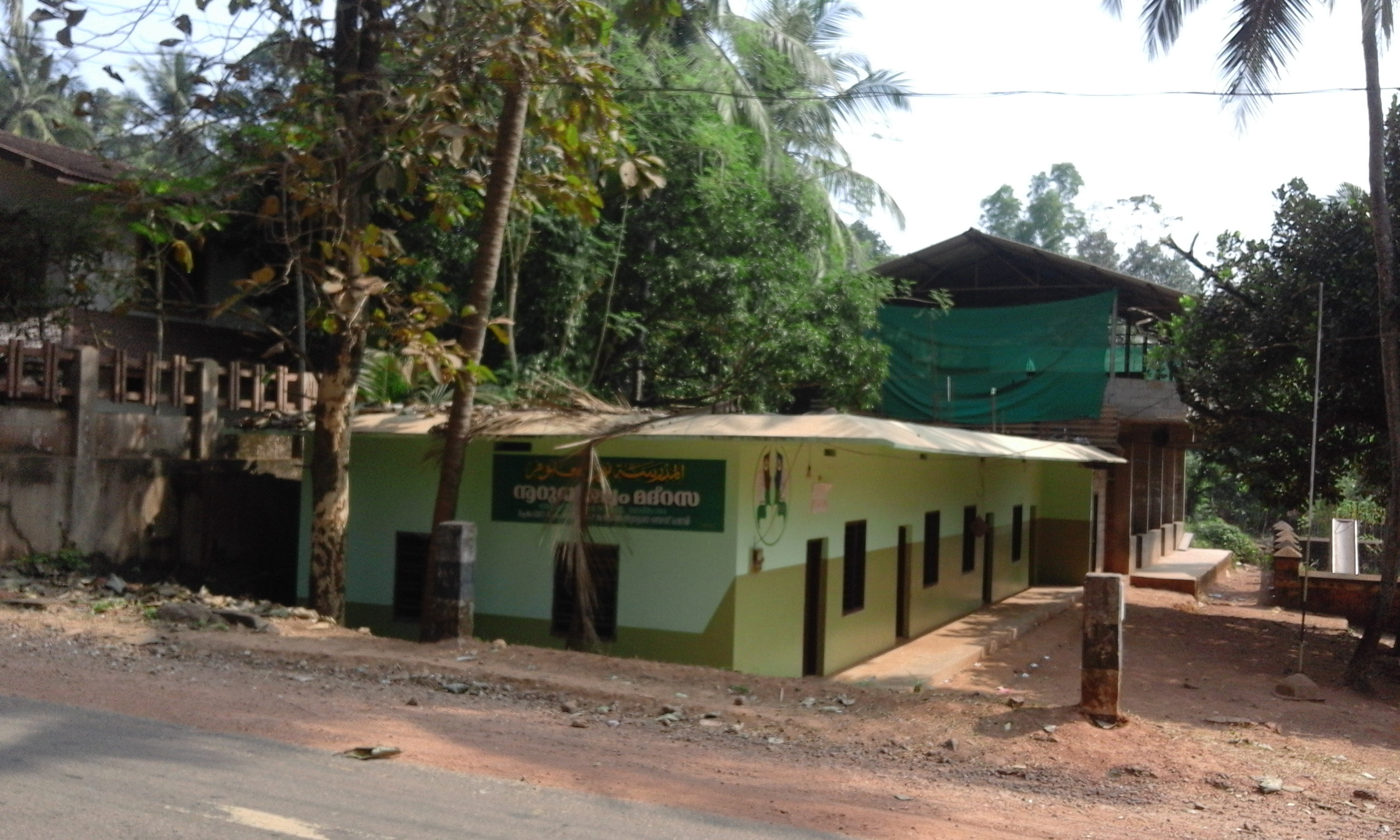
Omanoor Madhrassah
