= Saharu Nusaiba Kannanari =

Indian author

Saharu Nusaiba Kannanari is an Indian author best known for his debut novel, Chronicle of an Hour and a Half. This novel was shortlisted for the JCB prize and was the winner of the Crossword Award for Indian English writers in 2024.

== Biography ==
Kannanari is a native of Areekode town in Malappuram district, Kerala. He holds a bachelor's degree in political science from Aligarh Muslim University and a master's degree in political science from Jawaharlal Nehru University. His second book, The Menon Investigation, was released in 2025.
