= Areekode =

- Town
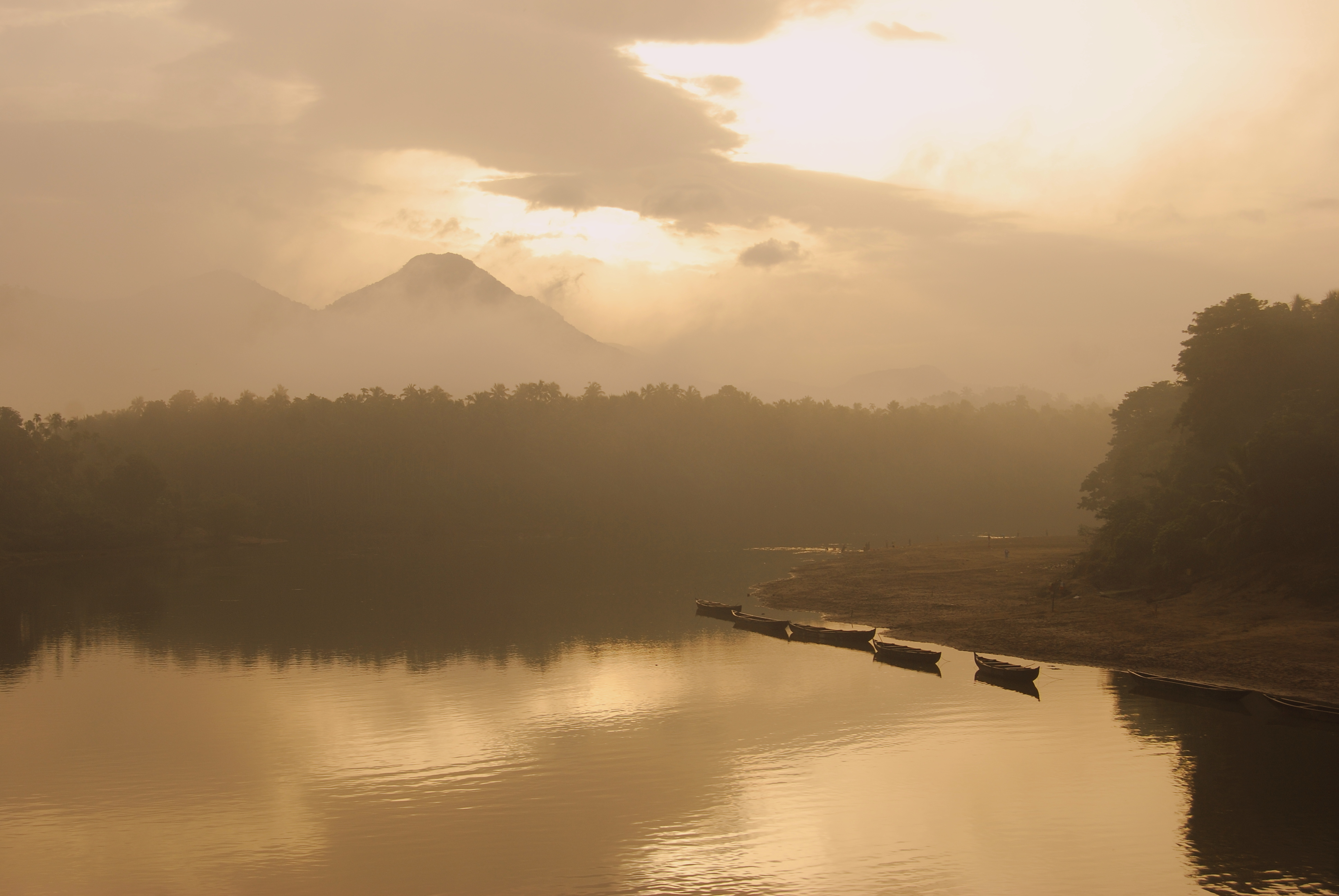
- Interactive map of Areekode
- Coordinates: 11.237716°N 76.050088°E
- Country: India
- State: Kerala
- District: Malappuram

Government
  - Type: Block Panchayath
  - Body: UDF

Languages
  - Official: Malayalam, English
- Time zone: UTC+5:30 (IST)
- PIN: 673639
- Telephone code: 0483
- Vehicle registration: KL-84
- Website: https://www.areekode.com/

Areekode is a town on the banks of the Chaliyar River in Areekode Grama Panchayat in Malappuram district, India. It was part of the Malabar district in British India.

Areekode has an area of 7.25 square miles and is one of the highly literate areas in the state of Kerala. Situated in the northern part of the Malappuram district, it is encircled by hills and hillocks capped in green. The Areekode region includes Urangatiri, Kizhuparamba, Kavanoor, and Areekode panchayats.

It is 17 km from Manjeri, 27 km from Malappuram, and 35 km from Calicut town.

== Etymology ==
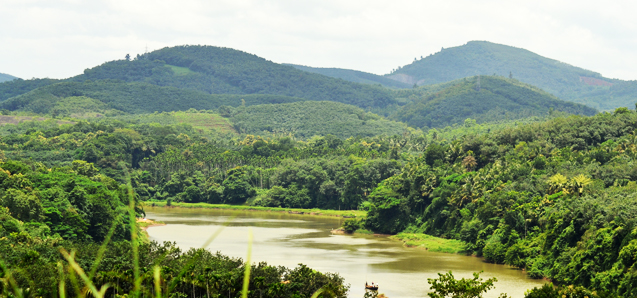
River Chaliyar at Areekode

It is believed that the name 'Areekode' was derived from 'Aruvikkode', which in Malayalam means 'riverside'. The town is easily accessible by public road transportation.

Another narrative is that 'Areekode' was derived from 'Arikoda', meaning 'where we get rice', referring to the local market(ചന്ത in Malayalam) which was active once in a week.

== History ==
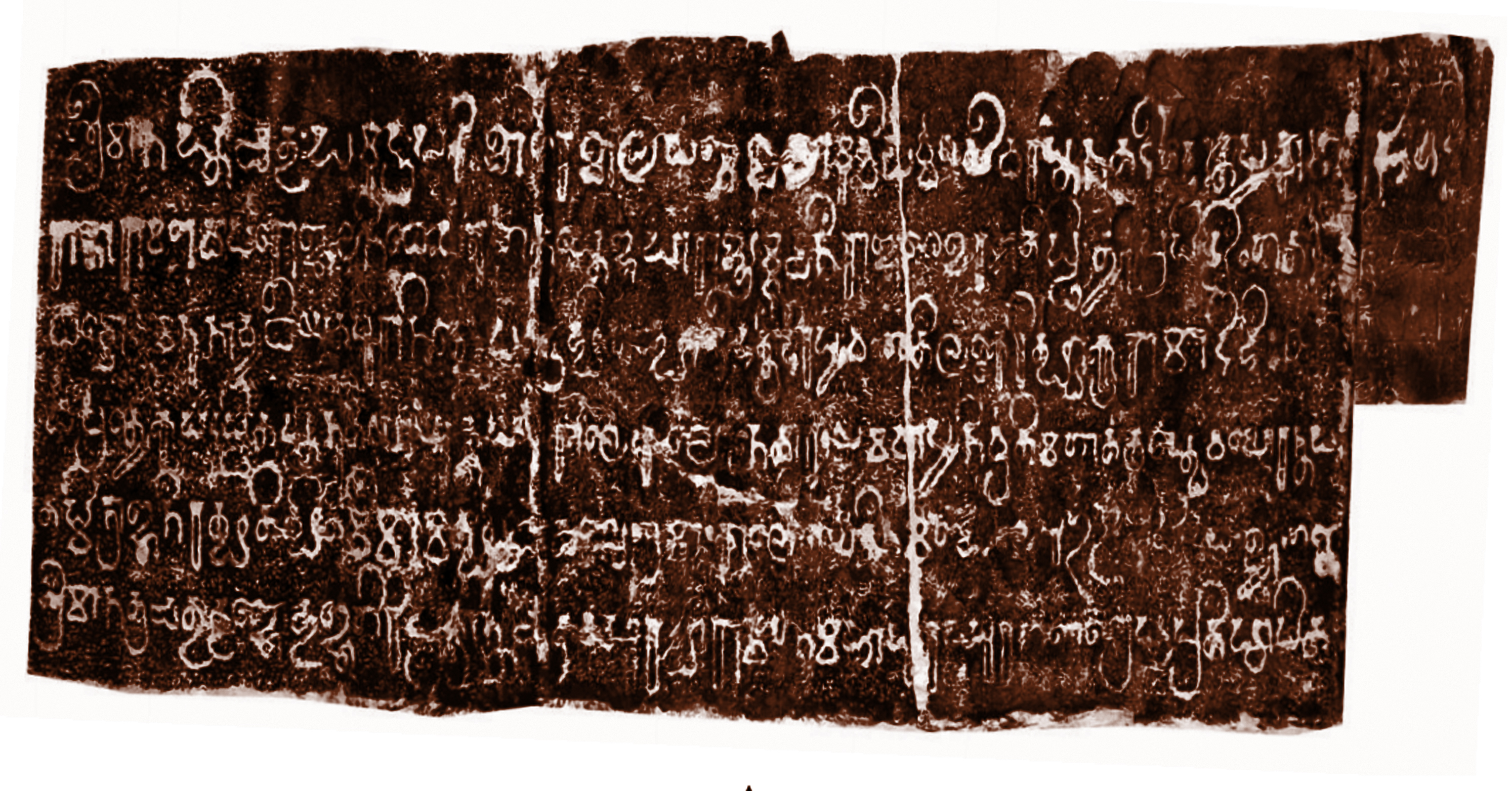
Kurumathur inscription (871 CE)

The Kurumathur inscription found near Areekode dates back to 871 CE.

== Transportation ==
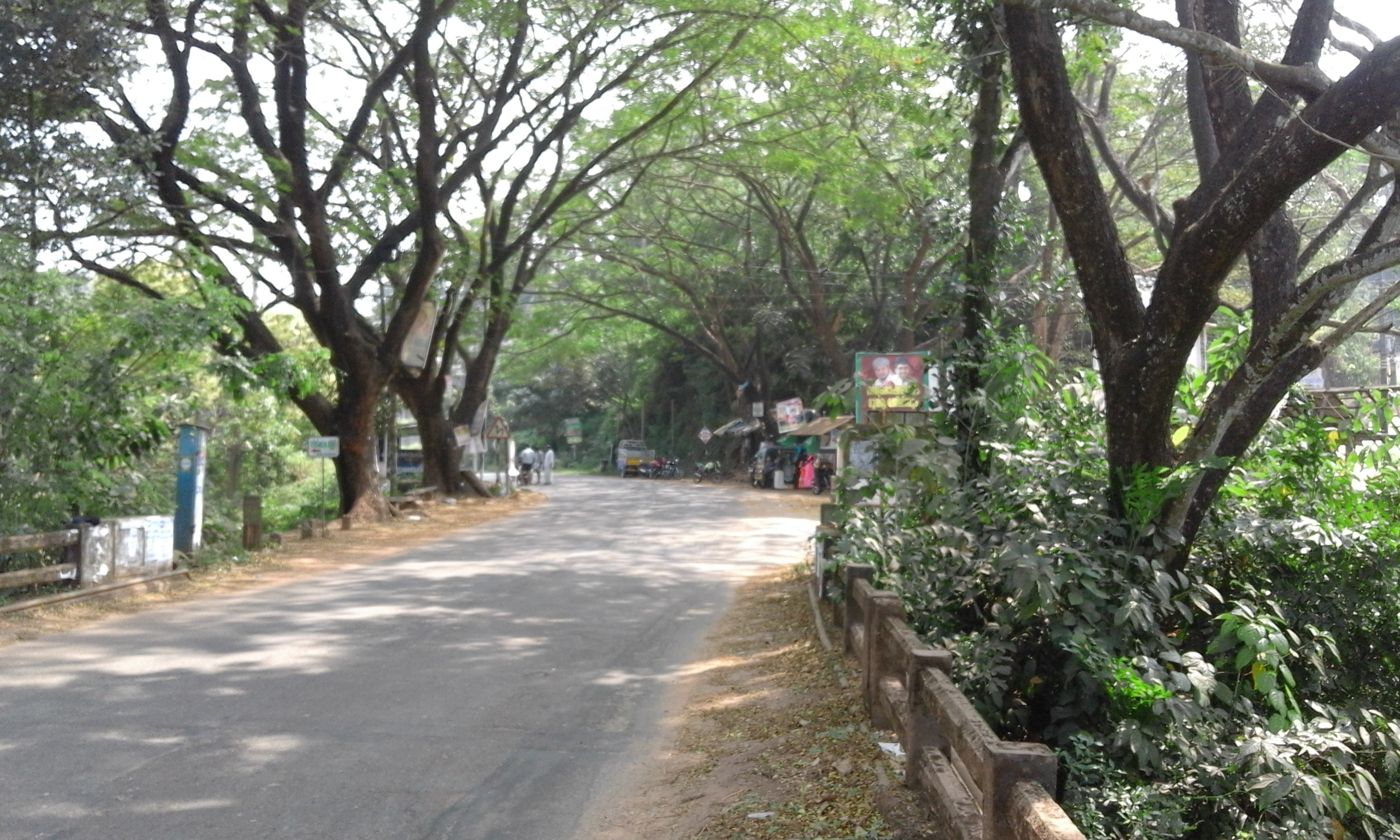
A road at Areekode

Areekode connects to other parts of India through Calicut town on the west, Nilambur town on the east, and Manjeri town on the south. It is only 35 km away from Calicut Town. National Highway 66 passes through Calicut and the northern stretch connects to Goa and Mumbai. The southern stretch connects to Cochin and Trivandrum. State Highway 28 starts from Nilambur and connects to Ooty, Mysore, and Bangalore through Highways 12, 29 and 181.

The nearest airport is at Karipur CCJ. Karipur Airport (CCJ - Calicut airport) is 30 minutes away from Areekode.

Upcoming palakkad to kozhikode greenfield highway planned through areekode region

The nearest major railway station is at Calicut CLT and Nilambur Road NIL.

== Suburbs of Areekode ==
On Mukkam-Thamarassery-Koyilandy/wayanad/mysore/banglore Road

- Pathanapuram, Kuttooli, Valillapuzha.

(NIT, KMCT Medical college)

On Kozhikode Road

- Pathanapuram, Kuttooli, Valillapuzha.

On Manjeri Road

- Kavanoor, Kilikkallungal, Elayoor

On Othayi Road

- Pathanapuram, Therattammal
- Moorkkanad, Thachanna
- Choolattippara, Kurikkalampad
- Kallarattikkal, Thachamparamba
- Maithra, Kuthuparamba, pavanna

On Edavanna Route

- South Puthalam, Vaakaloor, Vadasseri, Pottiyil, Pannippara, Palepetta

On Kondotty Route

- Muthuvalloor, Kadungalloor, Kizhisseri, Chemrakkattoor, Pookkattuchola, Kozhakottur, Puthalam

On Vazhakkad Route

- Ugrapuram, Poonkudi and Vavoor
- Edasserikkadavu and Kizhuparamba
- Vettupara, Edavannappara

On Thottumukkam Road

- Pathanapuram, East Vadakkumuri, Vadakkumuri, Pallithazhe

On Vettilappara ROUTE

- Pathanapuram, East vadakkumuri, Vadakkumuri, Iriyattuparambu, Ottathannikkal, Odakkayam

== Notable people ==
- U._Sharaf_Ali - Footballer.
- Zakeer_Mundampara - Footballer.
- Saharu_Nusaiba_Kannanari - Author.

== See also ==
- Eranad (State Assembly constituency)
- Chaliyar river
- Saharu Nusaiba Kannanari
