= Kondotty Nercha =

Indian Ancient Festival

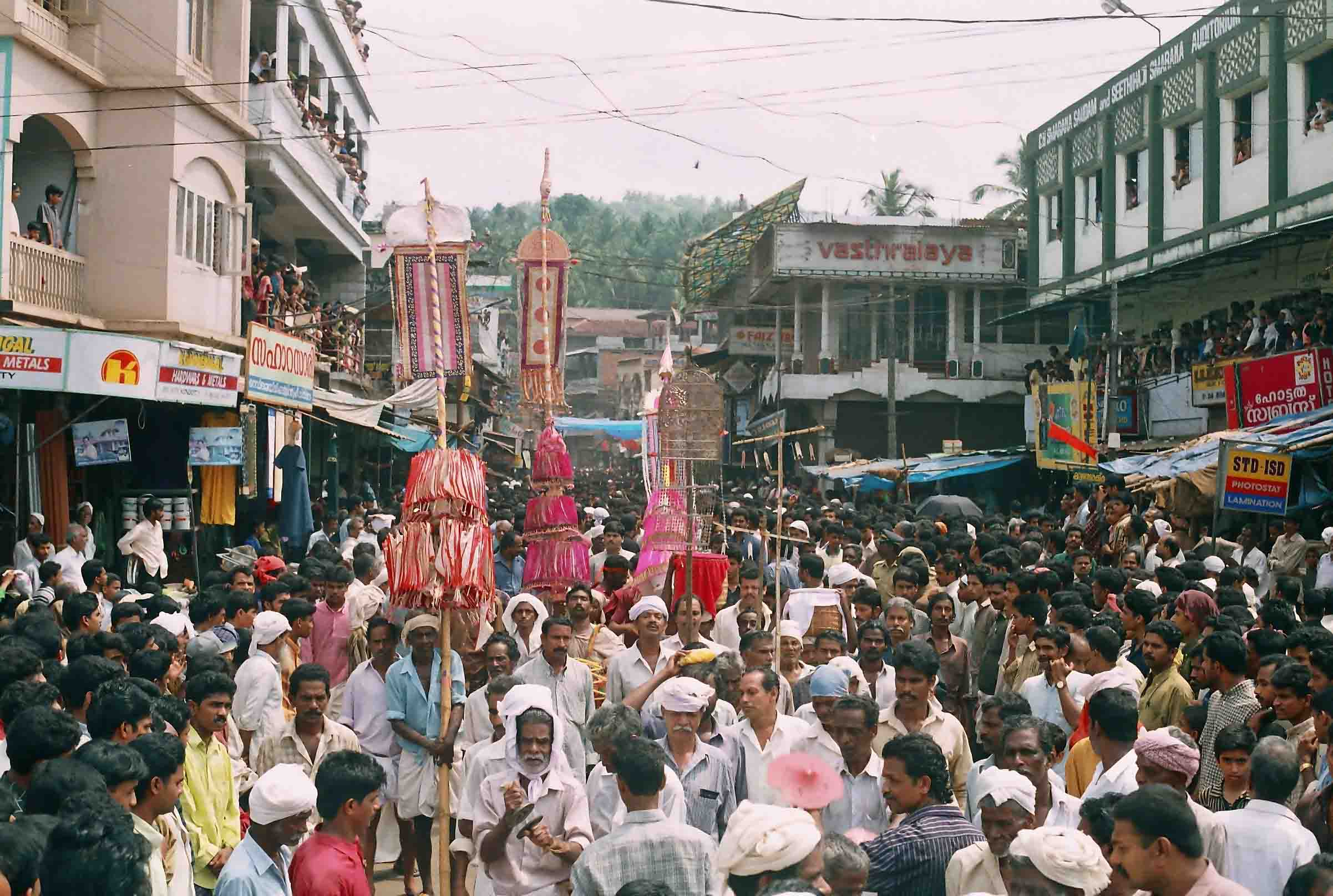
The arrival of the "Goldsmith Box"

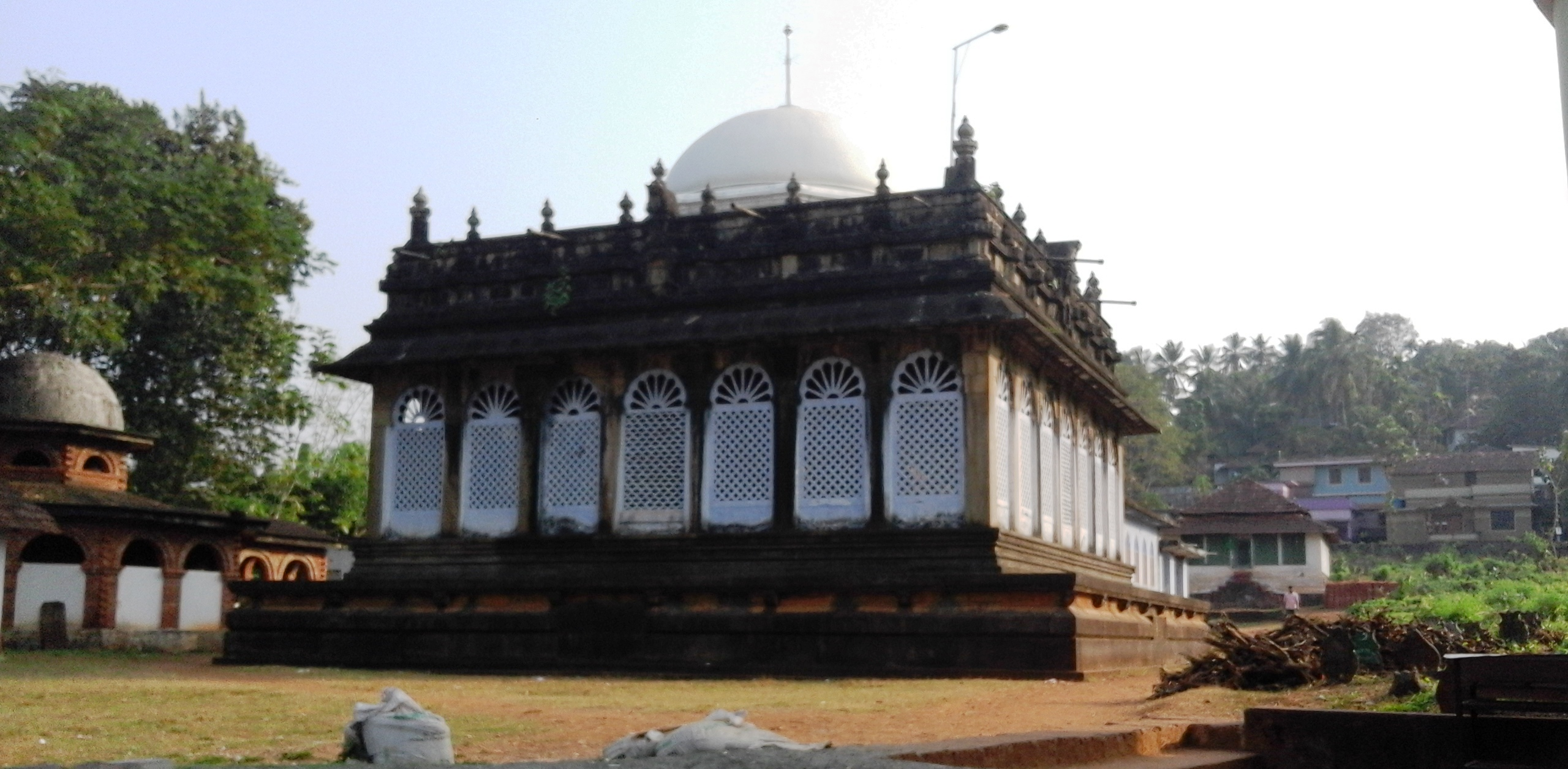
Kondotty Qubba

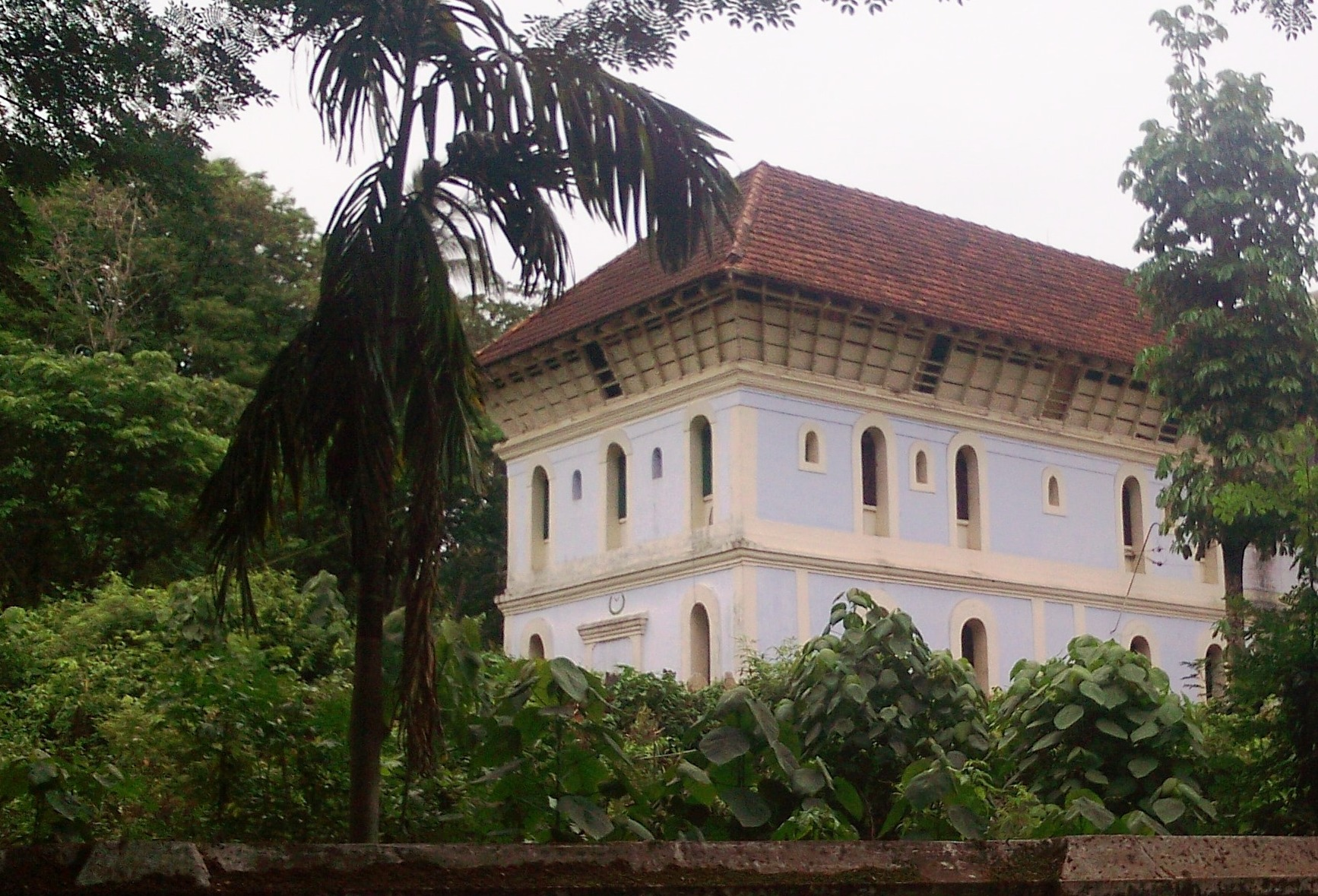
Pazhayangadi Mosque, Kondotty

Kondotty Nercha is a festival conducted every year in memory of saint Muhammad Shah at the Dargah in Kondotty, Malappuram District, Kerala, India.

== Muhammad Shah ==
Kondotty Nercha is conducted every year in memory of the Sufi saint Mohammed Shah, revered as the Kondotty Thangal. His tomb, built in the 18th century in the Mughal style with a white dome, is located in Kondotty and is known as the Kondotty Qubba.

== Spring Festival ==
Kondotty Nercha is essentially a spring festival conducted in March or April every year. Once the harvest is over, the paddy fields of Kondotty are sufficiently empty and level enough to conduct a large scale local festival. A cannon is sounded to herald the beginning of the festival.

== History ==
The Muslims of this area were formerly under the leadership of the Makhdooms of Ponnani and the Alid Sayyids of Mamburam. Mohammed Shah came to Kondotty in 1717, and his descendants became known as the Kondotty Thangal family. A biography of the Thangal family was written by Areekkod Kunhava. Mohammed Shah died in 1766 or 1767, and Kondotty Nercha is conducted every year at his tomb in Kondotty.

== The Rituals of the Nercha ==
- Three big cannons will be shot at the paddy fields of Kondotty to herald the arrival of the festival.
- A white flag is hoisted at the Thangal junction in Kondotty to announce the peaceful nature of the festival.
- The first procession arriving at the Dargah is the Vellad procession from Perinthalmanna.
- Various entertainments like Kolkkali, songs and dances are organized in the town.
- Another ritual is the cleaning of the guns of the Thangal palace. The leftover oil is believed to have medicinal values. A Hindu style lamp is also lighted during this occasion.
- The different processions from various villages come to Kondotty on different days. All over the route villagers greet the procession with fireworks and festivities.
- All the supporting villages join the festivities by making stalls for selling jilebis. Two kinds of jilebis are made: the white and expensive sugar jilebis and the black and cheaper jaggery jilebis.

== Distribution of Mareedha Sweet ==
The Mughal preparation Mareedha is distributed to the devotees at the end of the festival. Mareedha is a special sweet powder made of rice, ghee and various spices.

== Goldsmith Box Procession ==
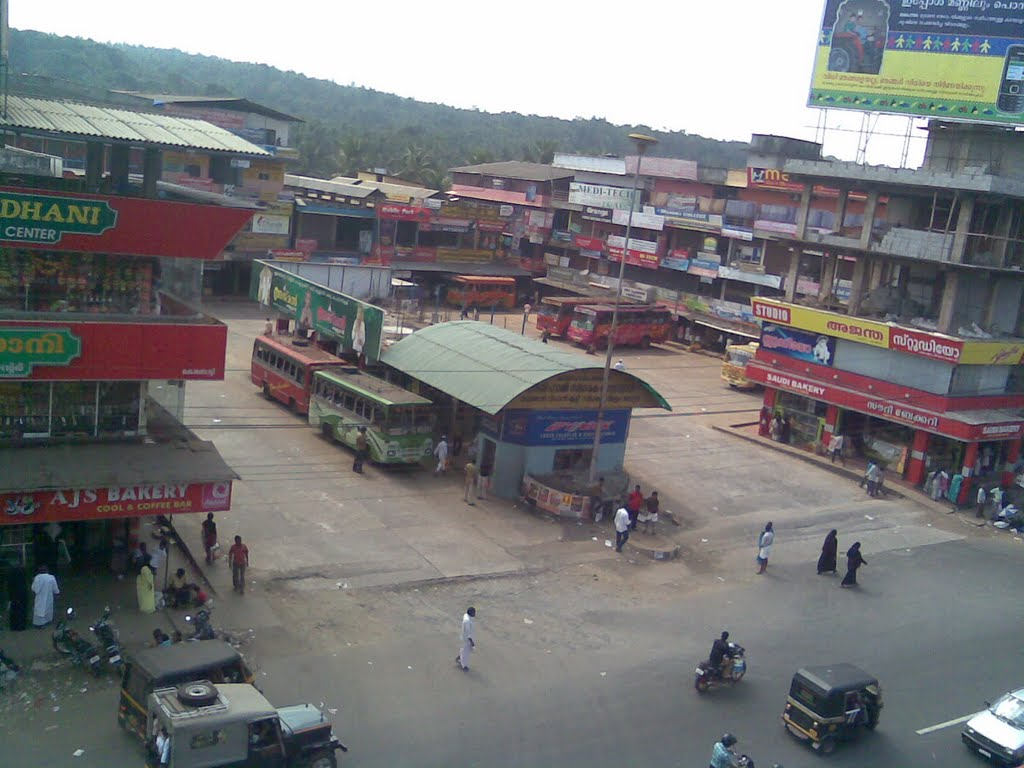
Kondotty Bus Station

The culmination of the festival is the arrival of the Thattante Petti or the Goldsmith Box which is a procession of local merchants and devotees. This procession can include only neighboring villages of Kondotty. During this day, the Thangal of Kondotty comes on a horse and greets the devotees.

Kondotty Nercha has a secular tone as it is celebrated jointly by the Muslim and Hindu community of Kondotty. The last procession of the Goldsmith Box is usually managed by the Hindu traders of Kondotty.

== Film on the Festival ==
A small group of students from GVHS School, Kondotty has made a short film on Kondotty Nercha. This 45 minute documentary film has become a local celebrity and won four state awards and a national award. The film shows the 100 year old history of the festival and more than 40 students participated in its making. The film was screened at Kerala State Children's Film Festival held at Kollam in Kerala. An eighth grade student called M.T.Shahama Bathool directed the film. The film is titled ‘Nercha Oru Nerkazhcha'. Thousands of people attend the religious procession and fairs held during the festival.

== Criticism ==
Some Muslim groups like the Mujahidhs and Jamaat-e-Islami are against the celebrations organized around Dargahs. They have organized partial boycott of the festival in recent years.
