= Chronicle of an Hour and a Half =

2024 novel by Saharu Nusaiba Kannanari

- Author: Saharu Nusaiba Kannanari
- Language: English
- Genre: Novel
- Publisher: Context (Westland Books)
- Publication date: 2024
- Publication place: India
- Media type: Print
- Pages: 201

Chronicle of an Hour and a Half is a 2024 novel by the Indian writer Saharu Nusaiba Kannanari. His debut novel, it is set in a fictional Kerala village during a storm, where a rumour of an affair spreads through WhatsApp messages and drives the villagers into a violent mob. The book won the Crossword Book Award for fiction in 2024 and was shortlisted for the 2024 JCB Prize.

== Plot ==
The novel takes place in the village of Vaiga, in the foothills of the Western Ghats, during the worst storm in living memory. A rumour that a young man, Burhan, is having an affair with Reyhana, an older married woman whose husband works in the Gulf, spreads through the village's men over WhatsApp. Reyhana's brother-in-law and his sons arrive looking for Burhan, and over the span of about an hour and a half the village turns into a mob. The story is told in the first person through several villagers in turn, among them the women Nabeesu and Reyhana.

== Themes ==
Reviewers read the novel as a study of mob violence and of how social media rumours can drive a community to lynching. Several reviews drew attention to its women characters, who have little control over events but resist the role of passive victims. Critics compared the book to Gabriel García Márquez's Chronicle of a Death Foretold for its foretold violence and its account of an event reconstructed from many points of view.

== Reception ==
Writing for The Space, Yashodhara Gupta called the novel brutal and sensitive at once and praised Kannanari's portrayal of its women characters. The book won the Crossword Book Award for fiction and the Atta Galata Bookbrahma Book Prize for fiction in 2024, and was shortlisted for the 2024 JCB Prize.
