= Edavannappara =

Town in Kerala, India

- Interactive map of Edavannappara
- Coordinates: 11°15′0″N 75°57′0″E
- Country: India
- State: Kerala
- District: Malappuram

Languages
  - Official: Malayalam, English
- Time zone: UTC+5:30 (IST)
- PIN: 673645
- Telephone code: 0483
- Vehicle registration: KL-84
- Nearest city: Kozhikode
- Literacy: 97%
- Lok Sabha constituency: Malappuram
- Vidhan Sabha constituency: []
- Climate: cool (Köppen)
- Website: www.edavannappara.com

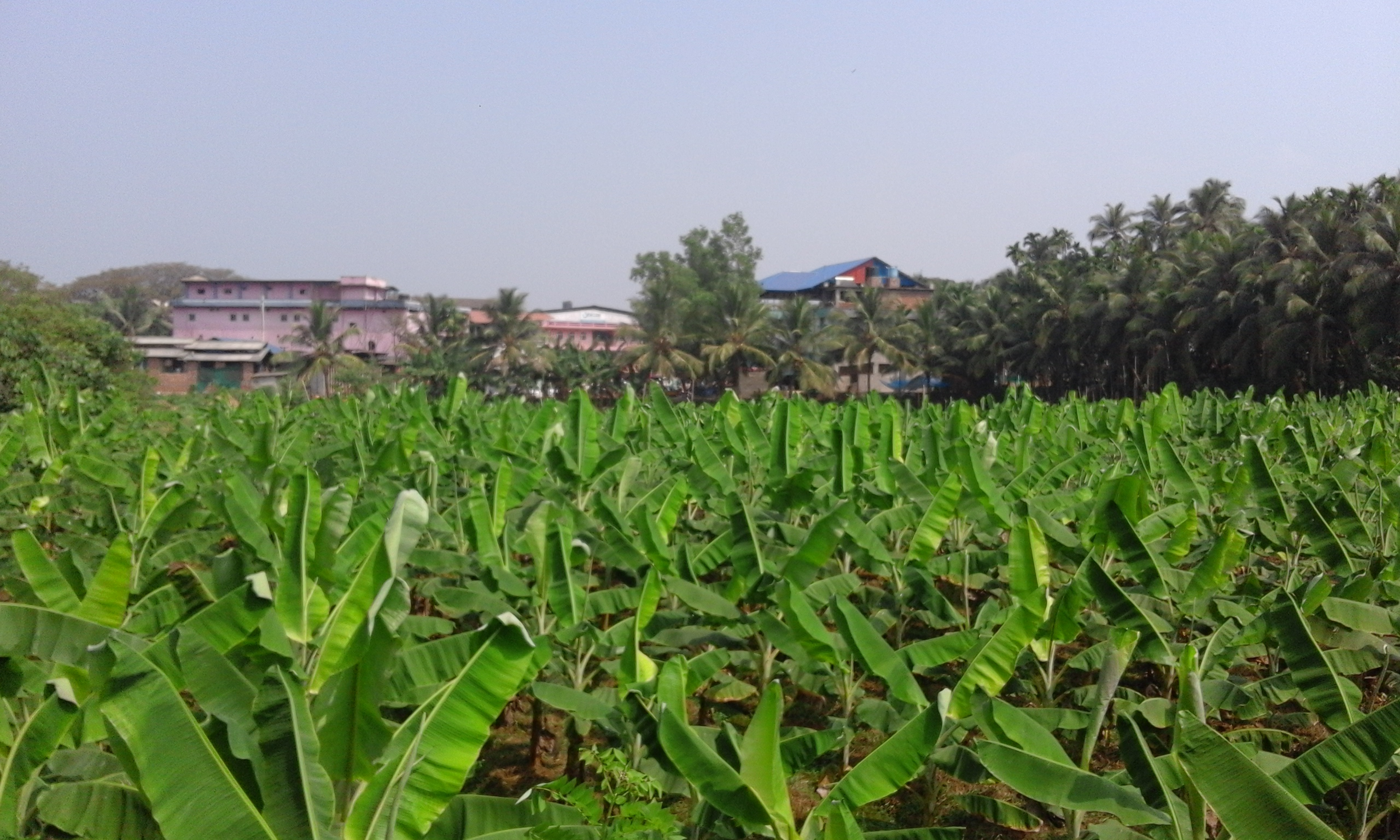
Banana cultivation

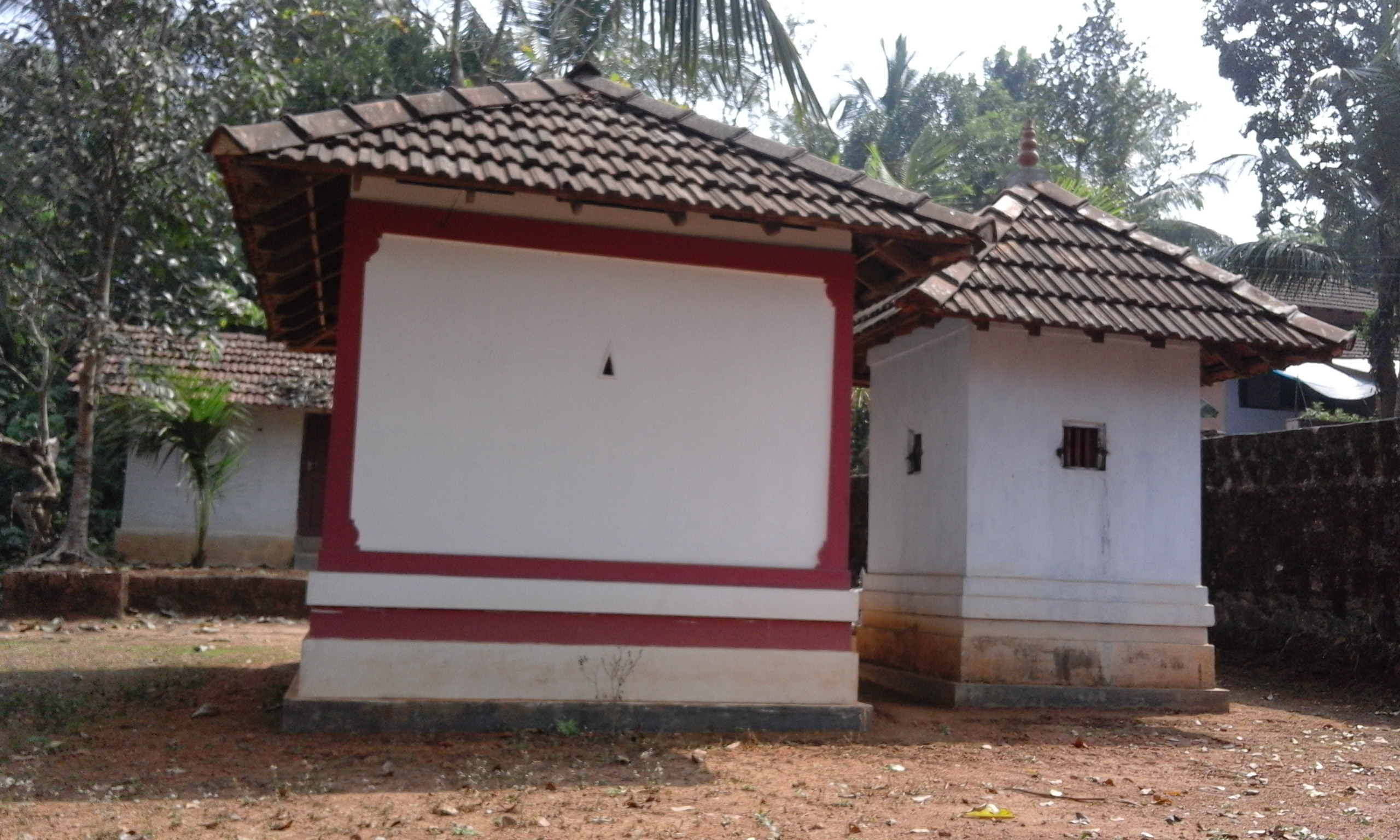
Nadakkottayil Padanayakan Kavu

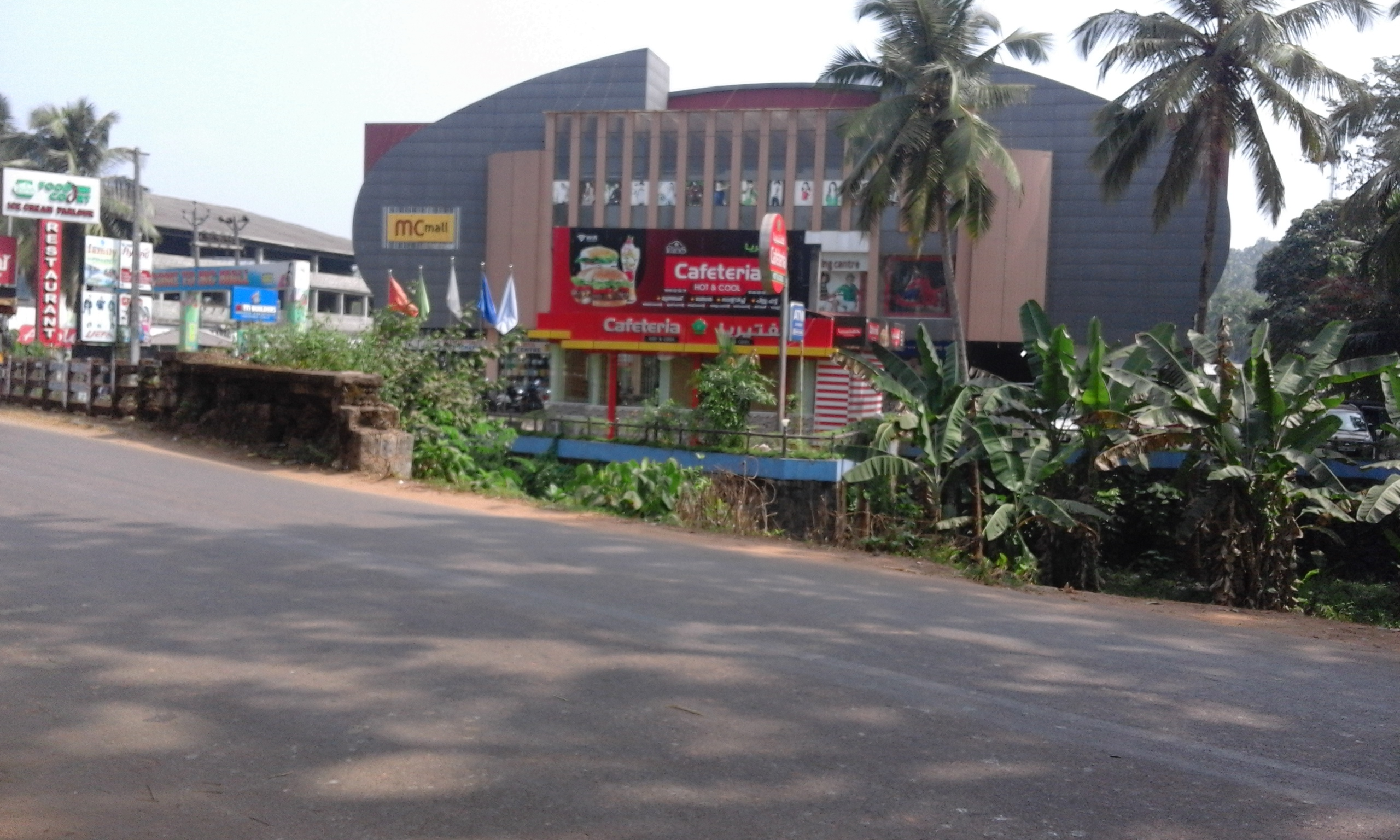
Kondotty Road

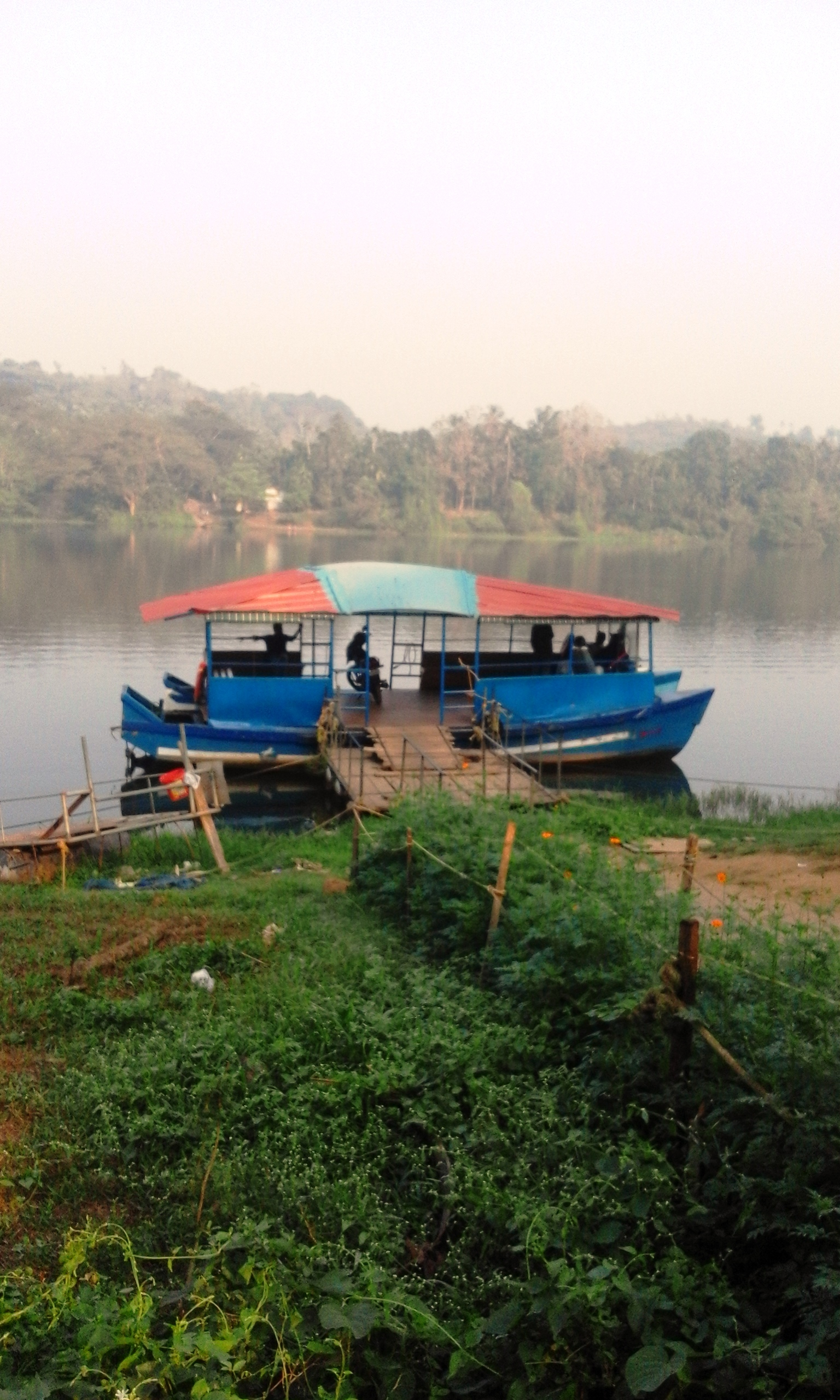
Elamaram Ferry to Mavoor

Edavannappara is a town in the Indian state of Kerala. Edavannappara town is 26 km away from Kozhikode city and 33 km away from Malappuram. The towns in Malappuram district like Kondotty, Areekode, Calicut Airport, 19 km) (Nilambur) is located near the town and the Chaliyar river. The main occupations are sand work and agriculture.

== Agriculture ==
Many people from Edavannappara are now entering into agricultural activities. The recent events in Gulf countries forced them to think in this way like the Nitaqat issue of Saudi Arabia. They recognised an agricultural career has more value now than earlier. The farmers have support available from authorities and from markets. Modern facilities and services are available to support farming activities. Fertilisers are also available to farmers at subsidised or regulated prices.

== Notable people ==
- Sri Elamaram Kareem former minister and communist leader
- Sri E. T. Mohammed Basheer former minister and Member of Parliament

== Transportation ==
Edavannappara village connects to other parts of India through Kondotty town on the west and Nilambur town on the east. National Highway No. 66 passes through Kondotty and the northern stretch connects to Goa and Mumbai. The southern stretch connects to Cochin and Trivandrum. State Highway No. 28 starts from Nilambur and connects to Ooty, Mysore and Bangalore through Highways 12, 29 and 181. The nearest airport is at Kozhikode. The nearest major railway station is at Feroke.

== Nearby places ==
- Kondotty
- Omanoor
- Areekode
- Elamaram
- Vazhakkad
- Cheekode
