= K. A. Rahman =

Indian writer and politician

- Born: Kavungal Amakkode Abdul Rahim; 1 January 1940
- Other name: Adhreehika
- Known for: Reorganizing and leading the Green Chaliyar Movement
- Spouse: Zainaba Koyyapuram
- Children: Sulaikha, Saleem, Sidequ, and Bushra.

Kavungal Amakkode Abdurahman (K. A. Rahman) (born 1 January 1940 – 11 January 1999), popularly known as Adhrehyaka or simply Adreyi, was the founder leader of the Chaliyar agitation in Kerala, India.

== Personal life ==
Adreyi was the third son of Kavungal Kunhoyi Haji and Poothottathil Biyyakutty Hajumma and married to Zainaba daughter of Kunhahammed Haji Koyyapuram. He had his preliminary education from Vazhakkad School and then studied at M.M. High School, Kozhikode. Rahman was elected to Vazhakkad Grama Panchayat in 1963 and has been Vice President of the same. He later became Vazhakkad Panchayath President. He was also the block Panchayath President in Kondotty Block. K. A. Rahman was the rallying point behind the Chaliyar agitation since the beginning.

== Chaliyar Action Committee ==
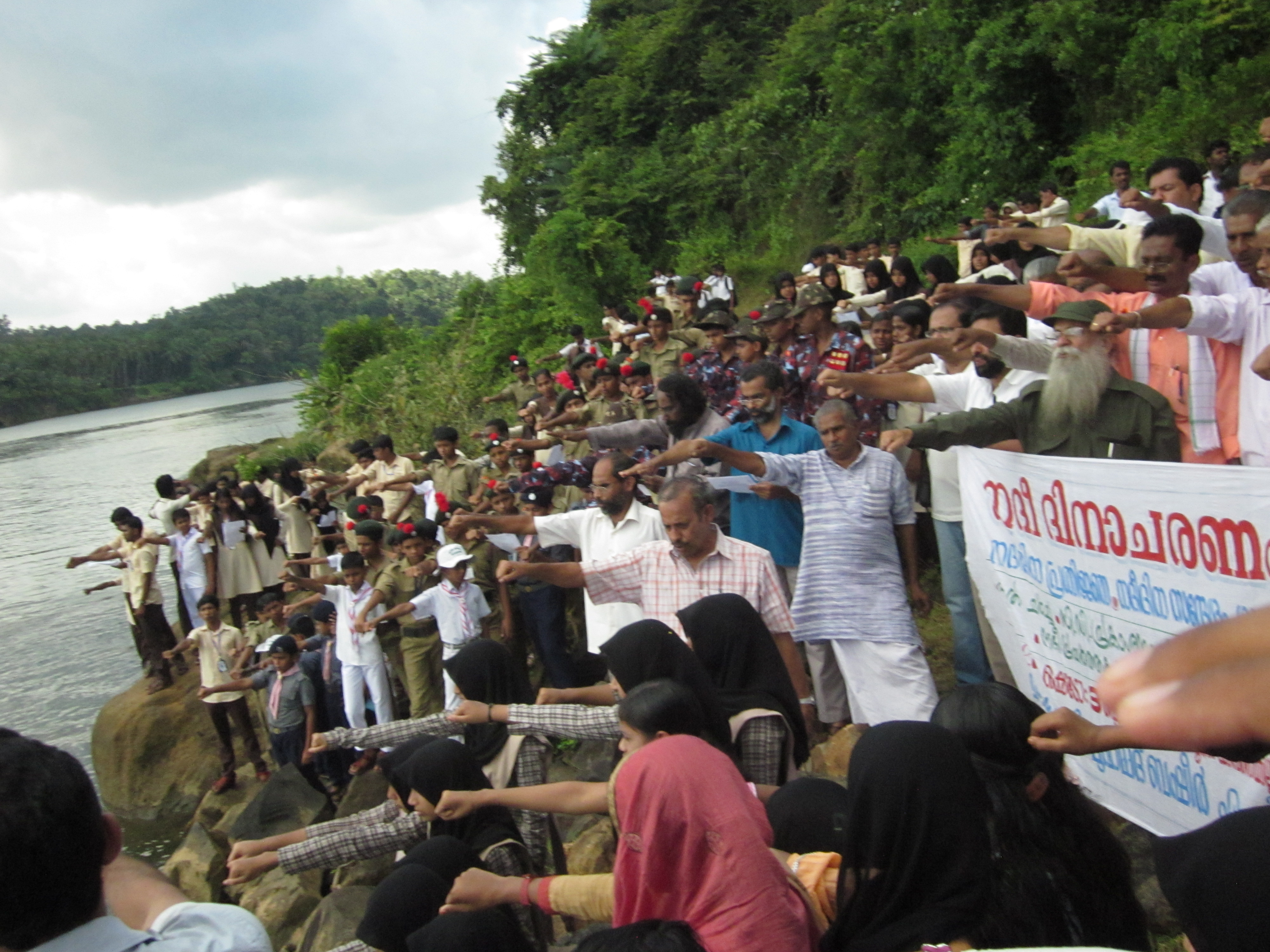
People taking an oath to protect the river Chaliyar

Rahman founded the Chaliyar action committee and it was the first public agitation against air and water pollution in Kerala and it led to an agreement between the people and the factory management in 1974 known as the Rama Nilayam pact, as it was brokered in the government guesthouse bearing that name. The high point of the agitation was in December 1998 when Rahman marched to the factory gates demanding its immediate closure with around 7,000 villagers behind him. Raw material had become scarce, and the factory finally closed down in early 2000 after Rahman's death.

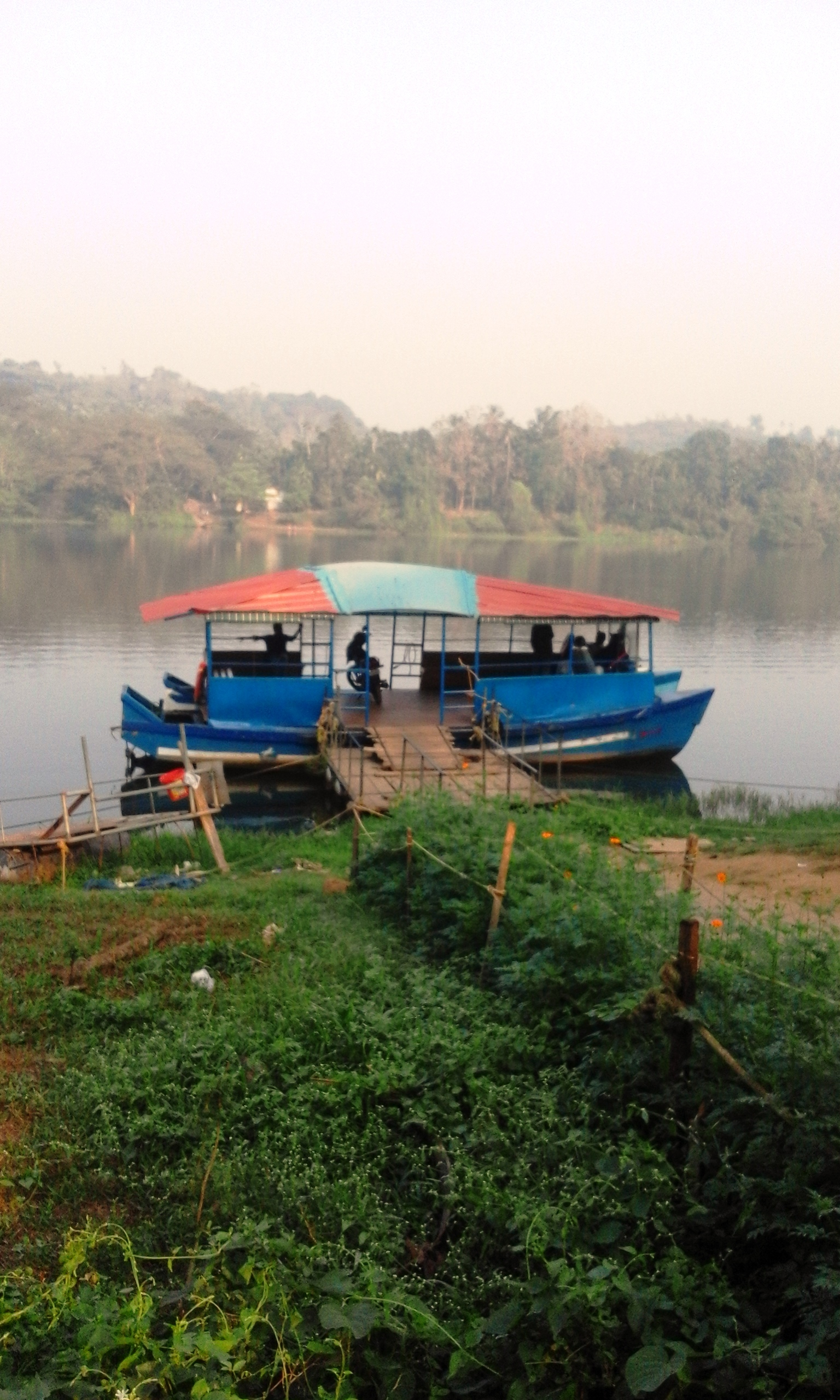
River Chaliyar at Elamaram Jetty

== Environmental Movement In Kerala ==
K. A. Rahman's Chaliyar Agitation against Gwalior Rayons factory at Mavoor is a success story of a people's environmental movement in the state—perhaps the only one. For the fight against river pollution in this land of rivers continues in other parts of the state.

In Rahman's own words, "There was not enough fresh air to breath [sic?]; nostrils reeked of mercury. Diseases devoured their victims at a frightening pace. Malformation of babies had multiplied. Cancer, heart attacks, respiratory diseases, failing vision and retardation of mental faculties were quite common here."

A State Level convention held in the wake of K. A. Rahman's death at Kozhikode said it was time to get the killer unit closed, redeploying/compensating the workers and paying compensations to the villagers affected by pollution. And on 20 January, ten persons hospitalized after a sulphur dioxide gas leak from the factory and next day Kerala State Pollution Control Board ordered closure of the CS2 plant. On 26 January, the people embarked on a new phase of struggle by starting a relay hungerstrike in front of the factory under the leadership of K.A.Mohamed Salim, Rahman's son. Kerala's human rights groups have called for a boycott of Grasim products.

Working relentlessly for the Chaliyar, K.A.Rahman finally succumbed to cancer gifted by the emissions from the factory but said, even while dying, that his people would continue the struggle. Ultimately, his people won over the might of pr-industry lobby.K.A Rahman's name can be seen in the cancer death register that he himself introduced three years before his death. Though incomplete, the register itself remain a symbol of the determination of K.A. Rahman to fight the mighty. As per the entries in the register, 213 people died of cancer in Vazhakkad village alone after facing the brunt of the mercury and cadmium discharged into the river. Another 79 died in the nearby areas.

== Pages from visitors book ==
Arundhati Roy winner of the Booker Prize "I'm sorry I came on such a sad occasion Wishing you every strength in your fight."
