= Vazhakkad =

- Village
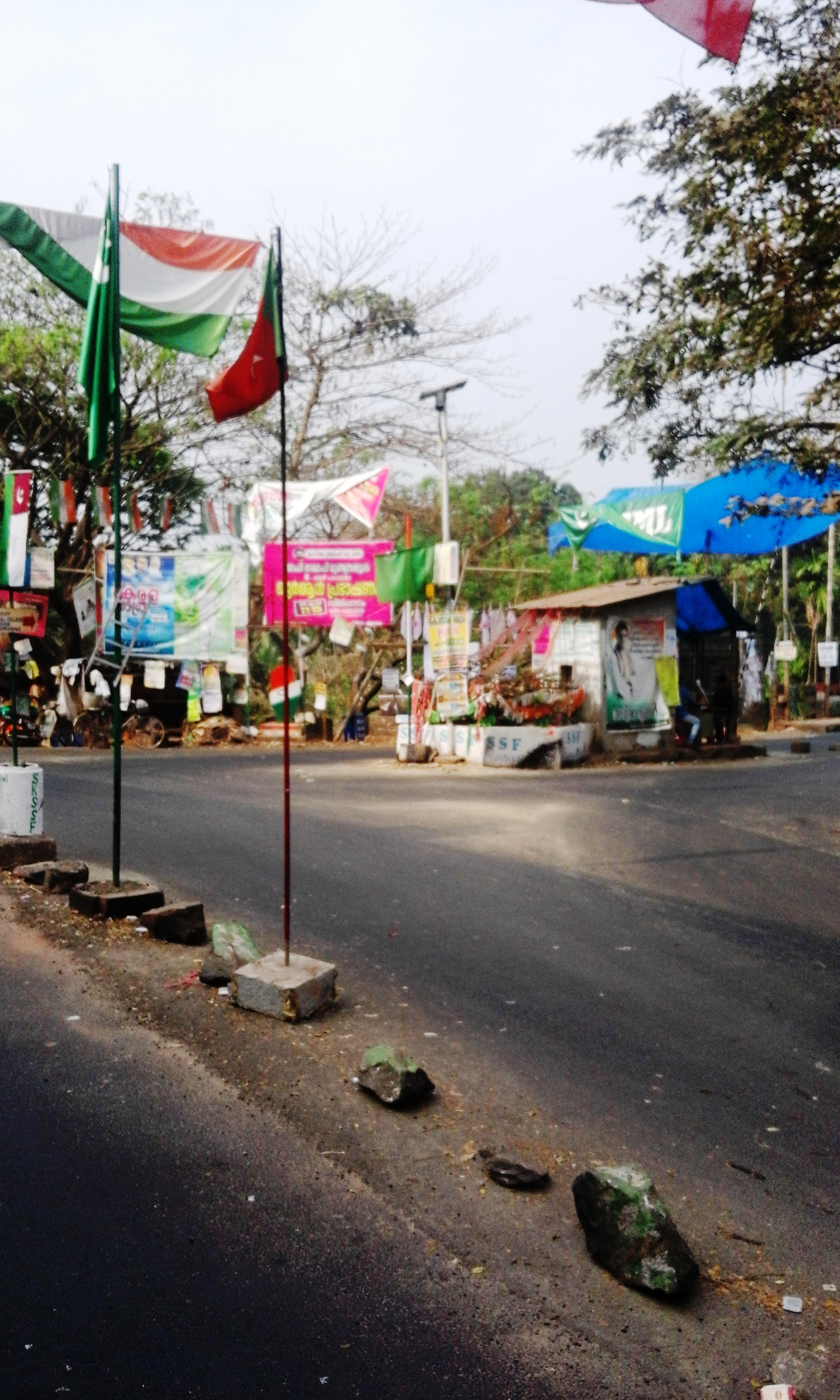
- Oorkkadavu Bridge, Vazhakkad
- Interactive map of Vazhakkad
- Coordinates: 11°15′0″N 75°57′0″E
- Country: India
- State: Kerala
- District: Malappuram

Population (2011)
  - Total: 35,774

Languages
  - Official: Malayalam, English
- Time zone: UTC+5:30 (IST)
- PIN: 673640/5
- Vehicle registration: KL-84
- Nearest city: Kozhikkode
- Literacy: 98%
- Lok Sabha constituency: Malappuram
- Vidhan Sabha constituency: Kondotty

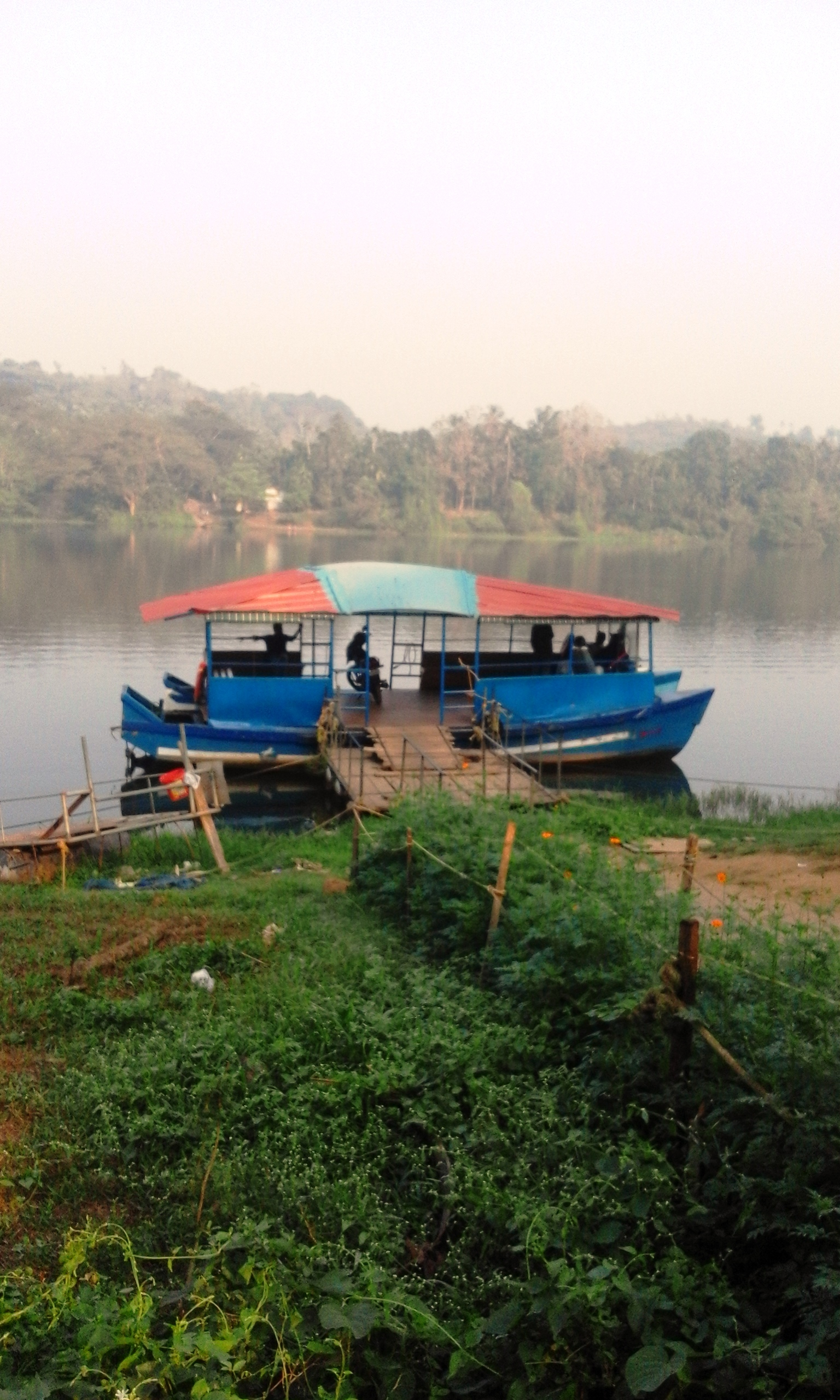
Elamaram Jetty

Vazhakkad is a village located on the banks of River Chaliyar in Kondotty taluk, Malappuram District, Kerala, India. The eastern and some northern parts of Vazhakkad border the River Chaliyar, South Cheekode and Pulikkal panchayats and West Vazhayur grama panchayat. The nearest town is Edavannappara three kilometers away.

== Notable residents ==
- K A Rahman, died 11 January 1999, leader of the Chaliyar Agitation, president of Vazhakkad Grama Panchayat, and winner of Bhoomi Mithra Award.
- E. T. Mohammed Basheer, member of the 15th Lok Sabha of India.

== Demographics ==
Vazhakkad Panjayath has 18 wards:

- Vazhakkad
- Noonjikkara
- Edavannappara
- Elamaram
- Cheenibazar
- Mapram
- Ananthayoor
- Cheruvayoor
- Cheruvattoor
- Mundumuzhi
- Vettathoor
- Valillapuzha
- Akkode
- Choorappatta
- Chaliyapram
- Oorkadav
- Vattappara
- Kannathumpara

As of 2011 India census, Vazhakkad had a population of 35774 with 17280 males and 18494 females.

== See also ==
- Elamaram
- Edavannappara
