= Kondotty =

- Municipal Town
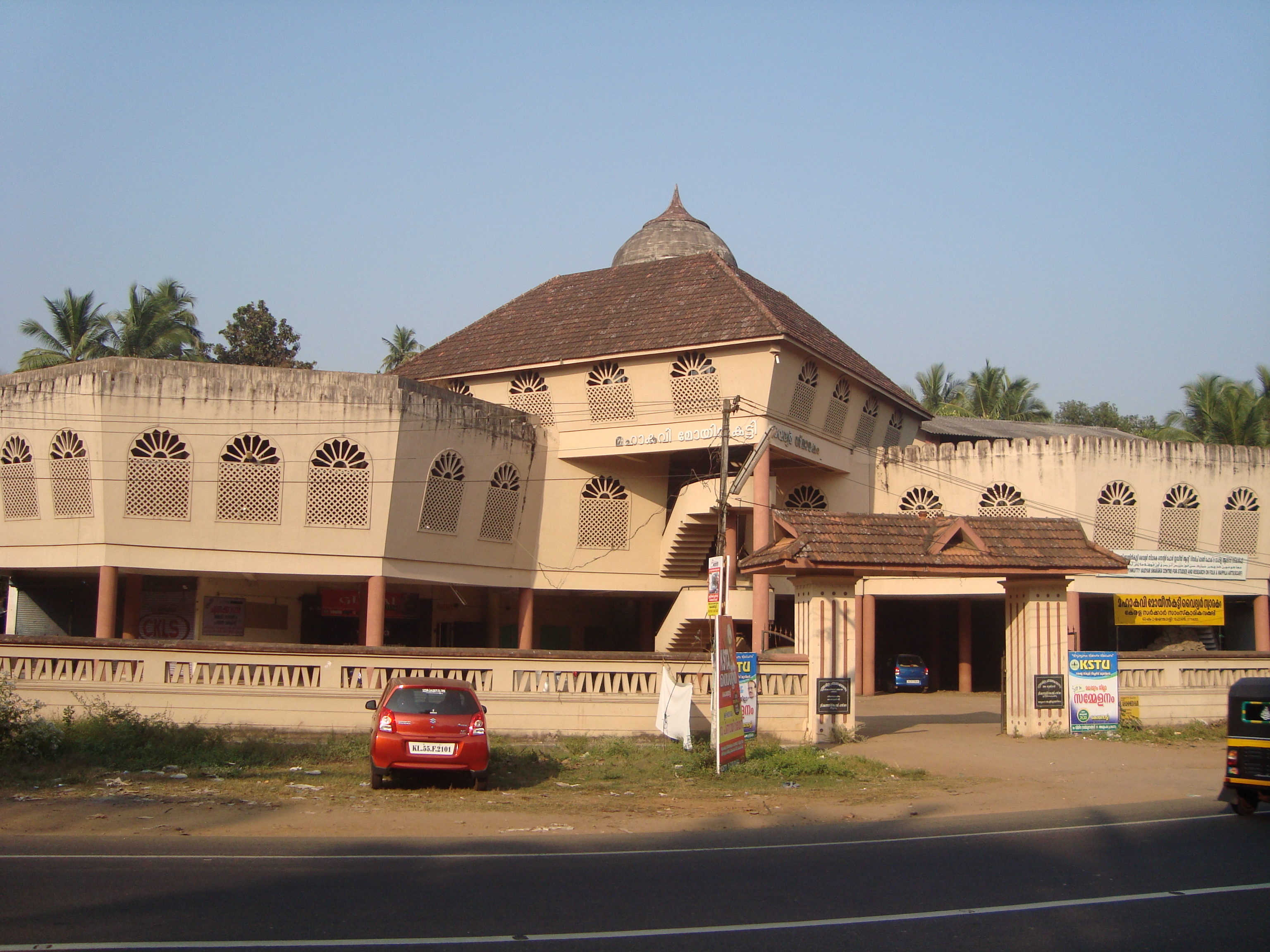
- Maha Kavi Moyinkutty Vaidyar Smarakam

- Location within Kerala Location within India
- Coordinates: 11.147°N 75.964°E
- Country: India
- State: Kerala
- District: Malappuram District

Government
  - Type: Municipal Council
  - Body: Kondotty Municipality
  - Chairperson: U.K. Mammathissa (IUML)
  - Vice Chairperson: Ayisha Bindu (INC)

Area
  - Total: 31.06 km^{2} (11.99 sq mi)

Population (2011)
  - Total: 59,256
  - Density: 1,908/km^{2} (4,940/sq mi)

Languages
  - Official languages: Malayalam
- Time zone: UTC+5:30 (IST)
- PIN: 673638
- Telephone code: 0483
- Vehicle registration: KL-84
- Website: kondottymunicipality.lsgkerala.gov.in/en/

Kondotty (Malayalam: [koɳɖoːʈːi]) is a town and municipality in the Malappuram district in the state of Kerala, India, located near Calicut International Airport, 24 km from Malappuram. It is the headquarters of Kondotty Taluk, which was declared as the seventh taluk in Malappuram district by chief minister Oommen Chandy on 23 December 2013, Real Malabar F.C is professional football club from Kondotty and FC Kondotty is the only All India Sevens Football club from Kondotty.

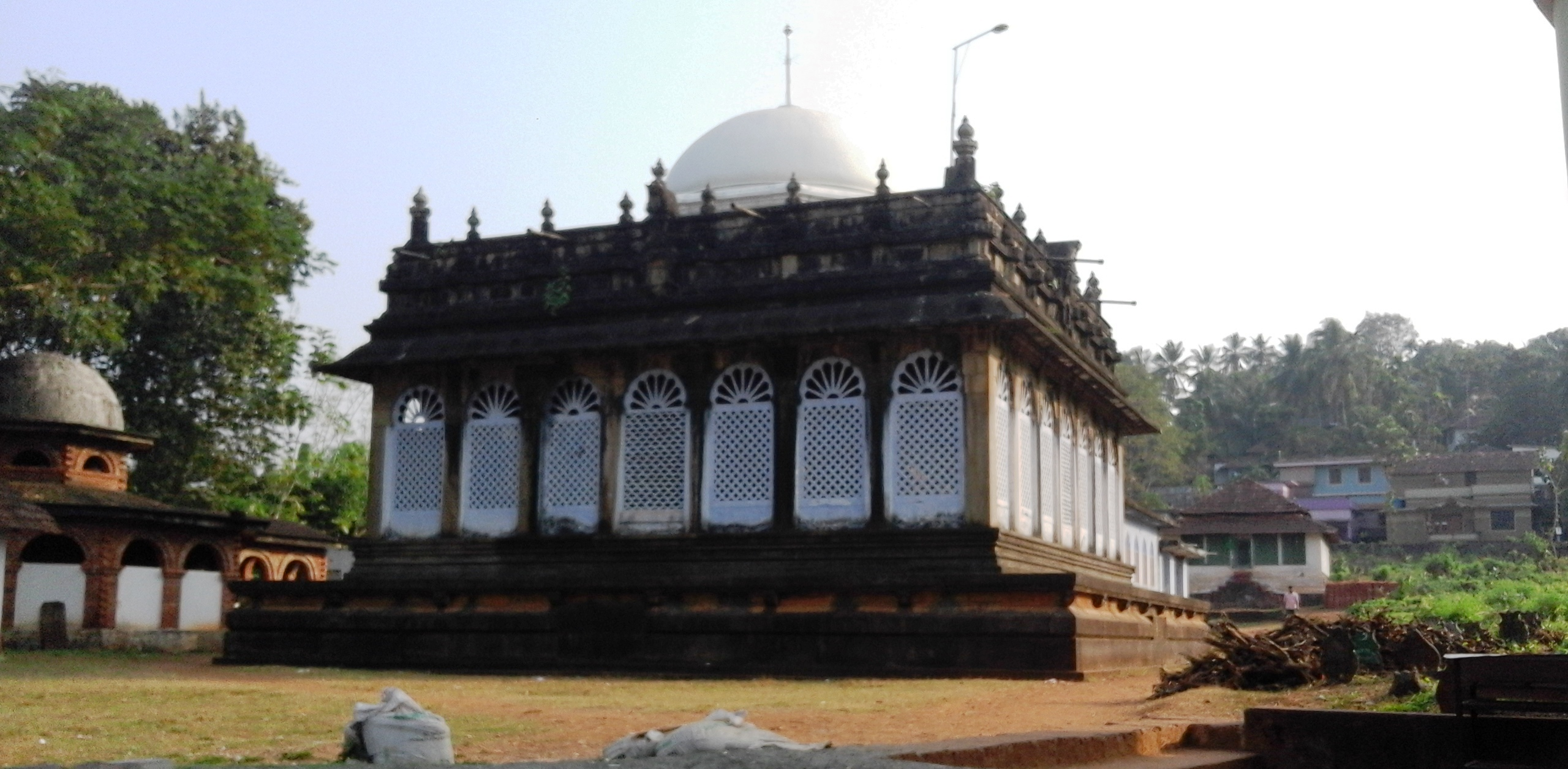
Kondotty Qubbah

Nediyiruppu region of Kondotty municipality was the original headquarters of the powerful dynasty of the Zamorins of Calicut (Eradi dynasty), who were actually the rulers of Eranad. The royal family of Zamorins is also known as Nediyiruppu Swaroopam.

Kondotty is famous for the Kondotty Nercha (Malayalam for 'offering') in the Pazhayangadi Mosque. Kondotty is the birthplace of the Mappila poet, Moyinkutty Vaidyar, where there is a memorial dedicated to him. He popularised Mappilapattu (Mappila songs) by his poems on secular and romantic themes.

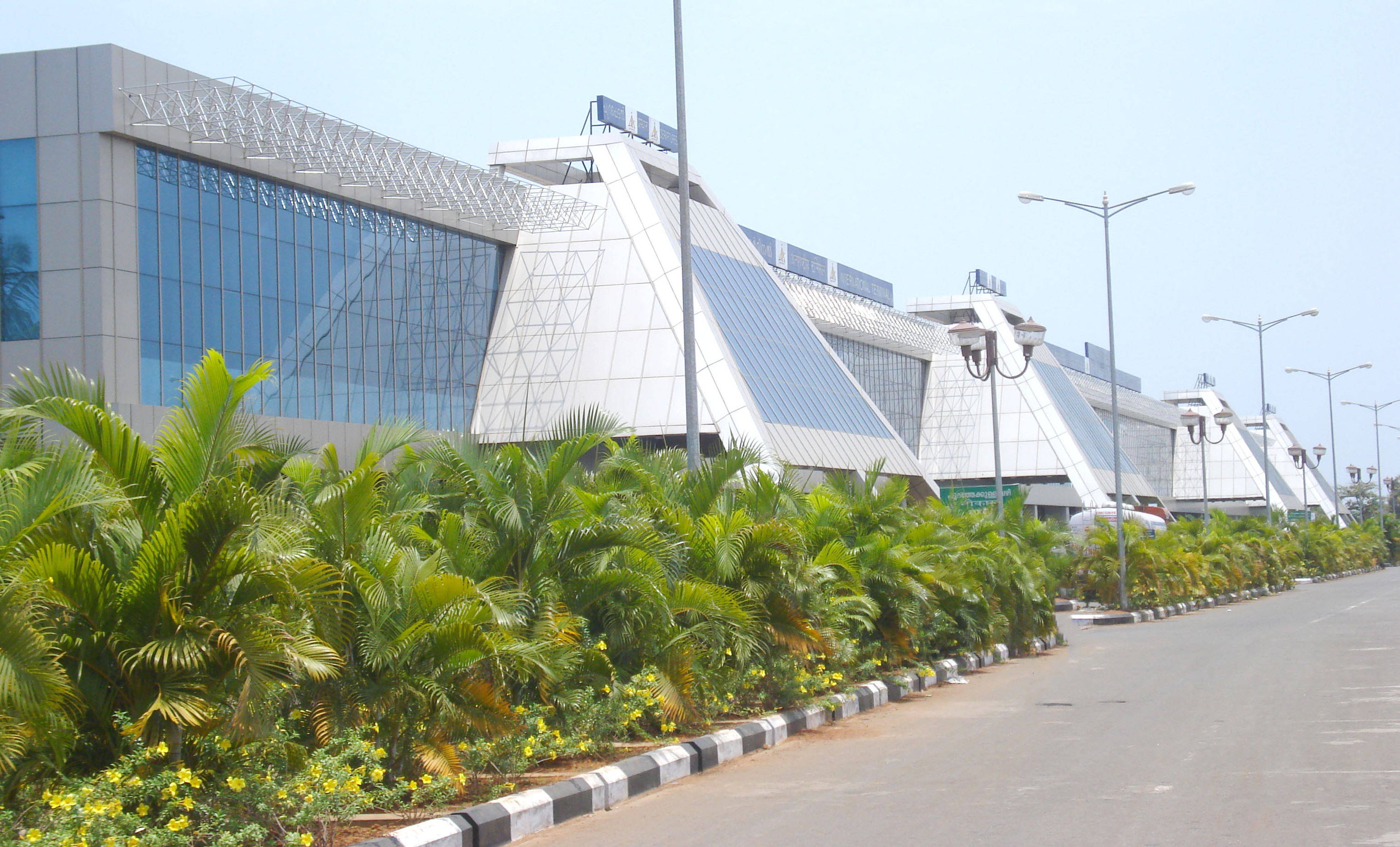
Karipur International Airport

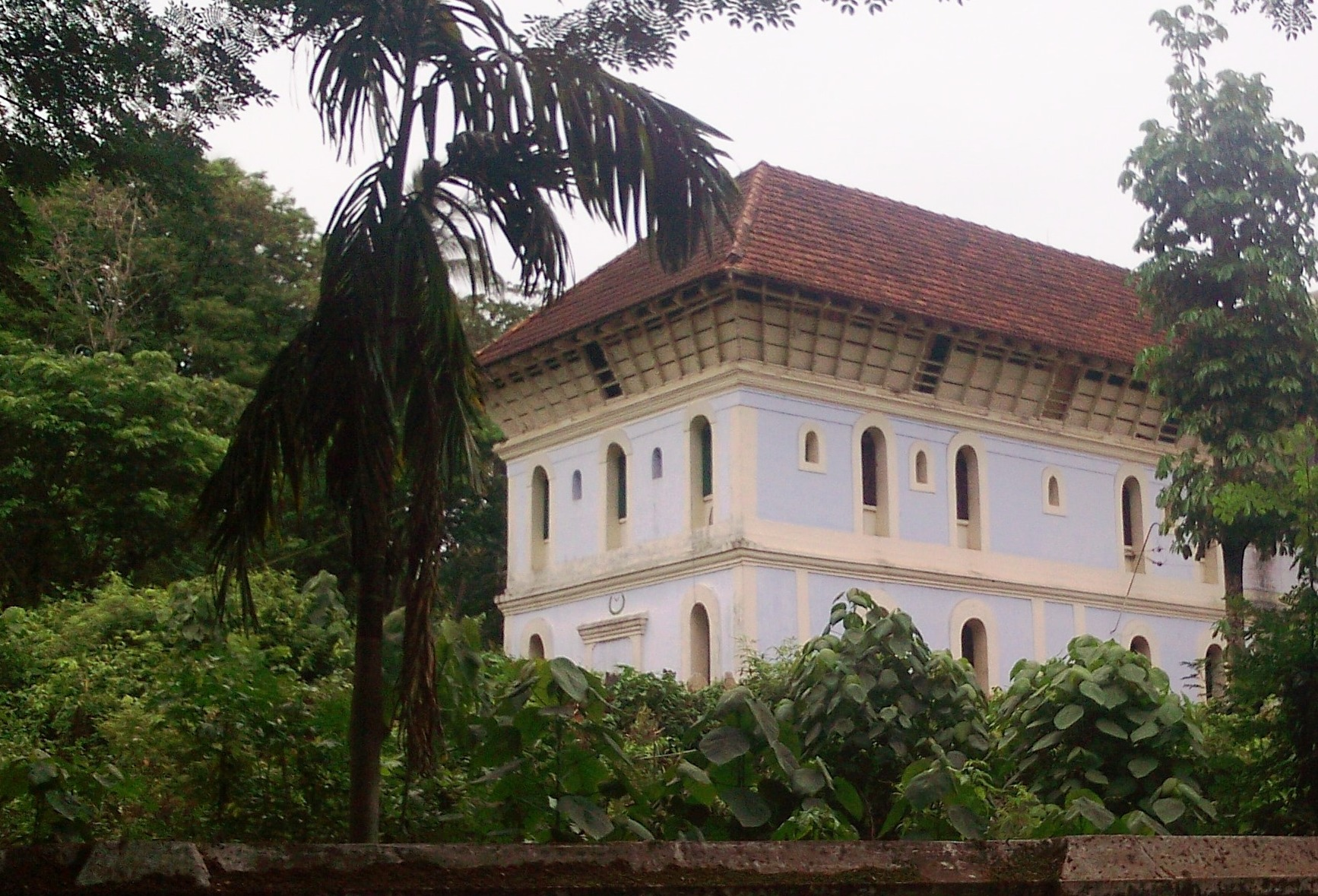
Pazhayangadi Mosque

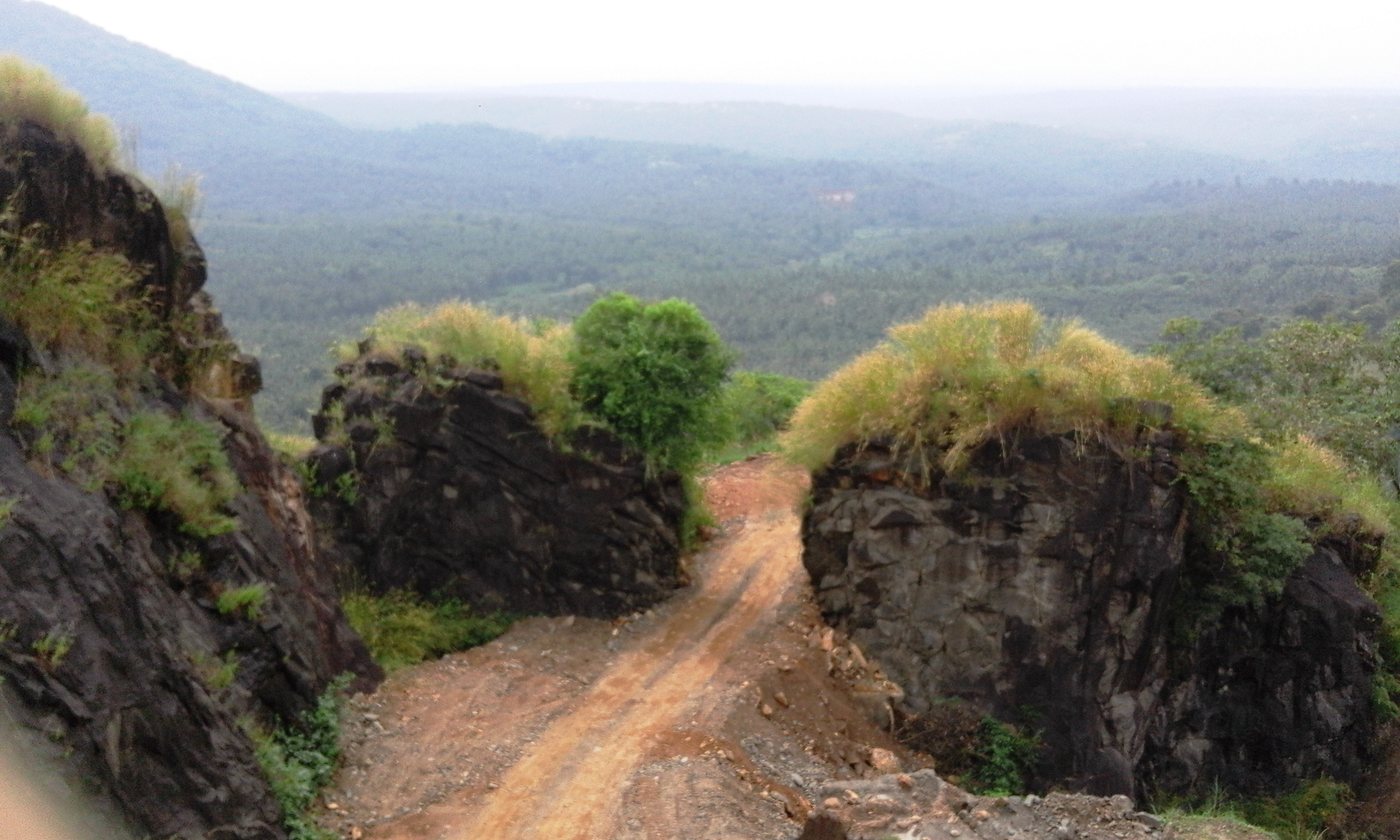
Mini Ooty Hill

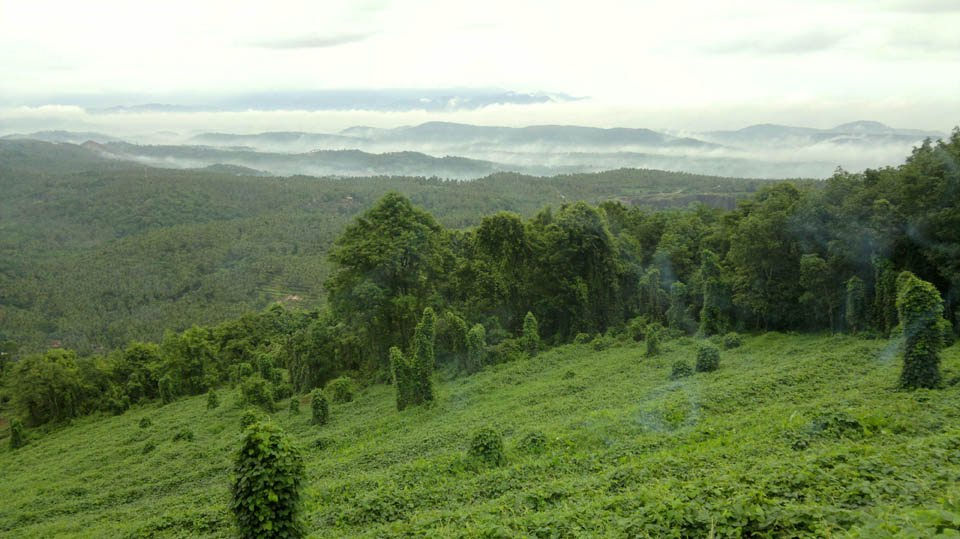
Oorakam Hills

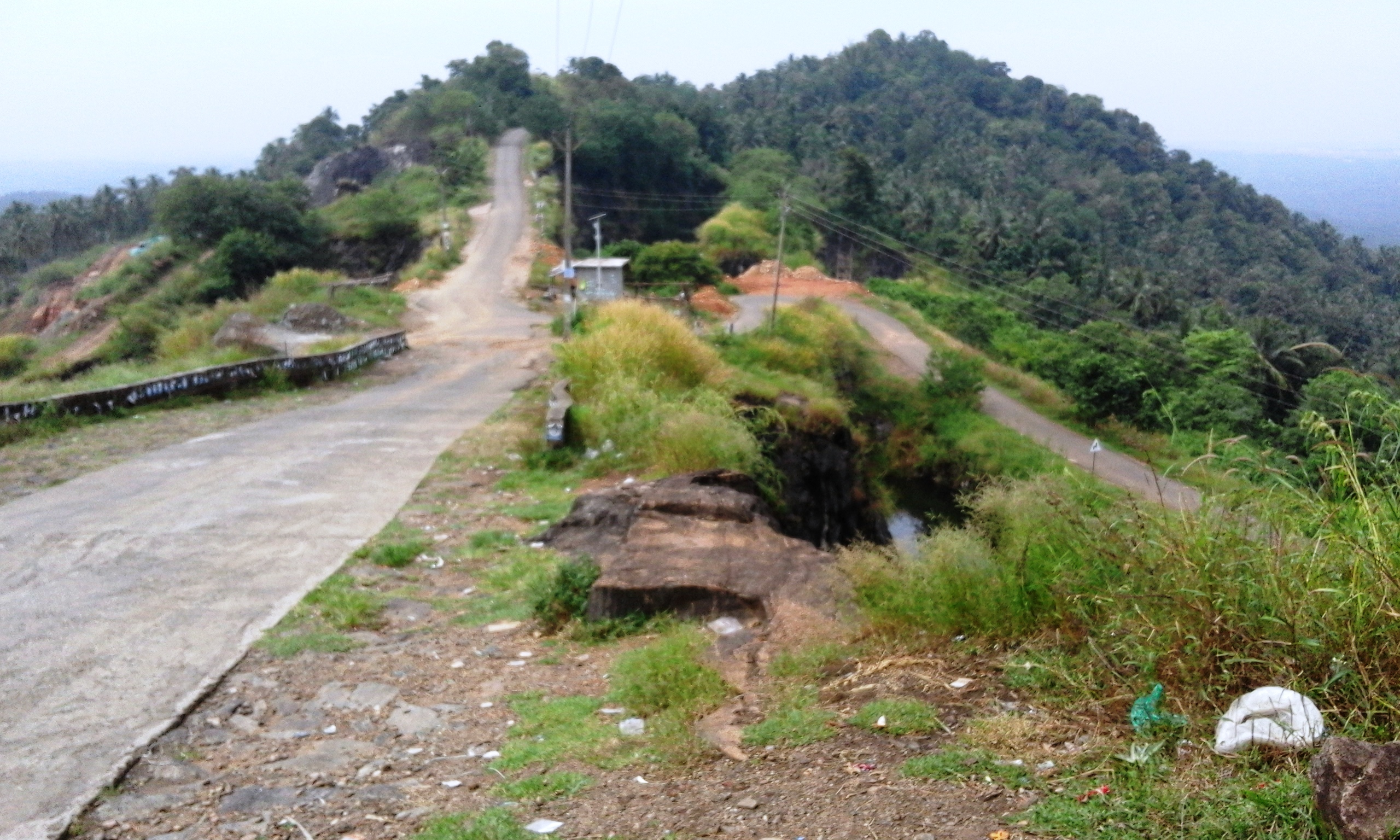
Cheruppadi Hill

== History ==
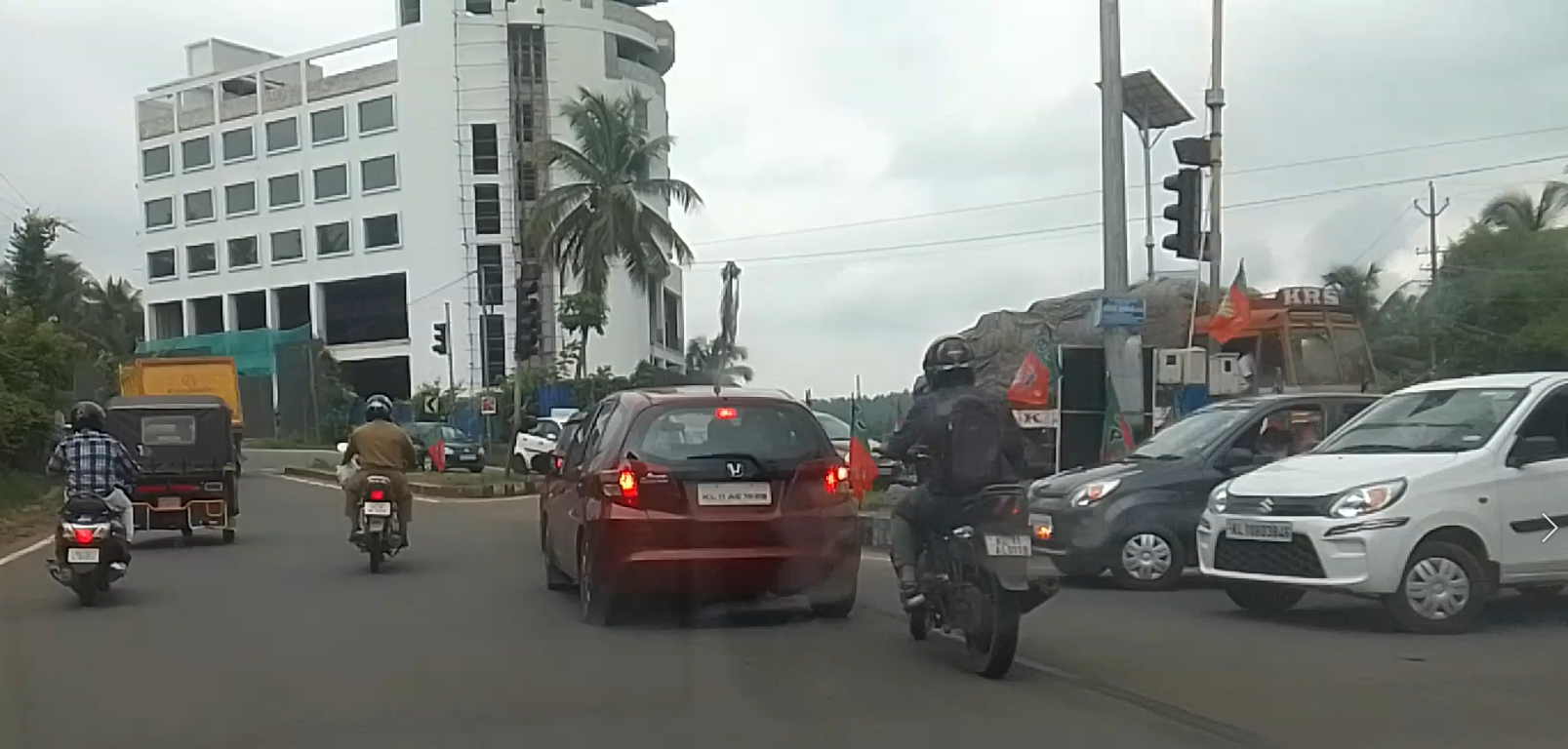
Airport Junction

The history of Kondotty is connected with that of the 18th century Kondotty Thangals, the Sufi exponents. Tipu Sultan of Mysore brought the first Thangal Muhammad Shah, to make the Mappilas allies. The Thangal first resided at Areekode and later settled in Kondotty. When the British arrived, putting an end to the reign of Tipu Sultan, the Thangal realigned with the British. During the 1921 upsurge, the Mappila mob attacked the house of the seventh Thangal, Nasiruddin Shah.

Nediyiruppu is 2 km from Kondotty. It is from where the Zamorin kingdom was expanded. During the ancient times, Zamorins were known as Nediyiruppu Swaroopams.

== Civic administration ==
=== Kondotty Municipality Election 2020 ===
S.No.	Party name	Party symbol	Number of Councillors
01	UDF		27
02	Independents		12
03	LDF		01

== Climate ==
The district has more or less the same climatic conditions prevalent elsewhere in the state: dry season from December to February, hot season from March to May, and the South West Monsoon from October to November. The South West Monsoon is usually very heavy and during which nearly 75 percent of the annual rains are received. The climate is generally hot and humid, with the temperatures ranging between 30 °C and 20 °C. The average annual rainfall is 290 mm.

== Transport ==
=== Air ===
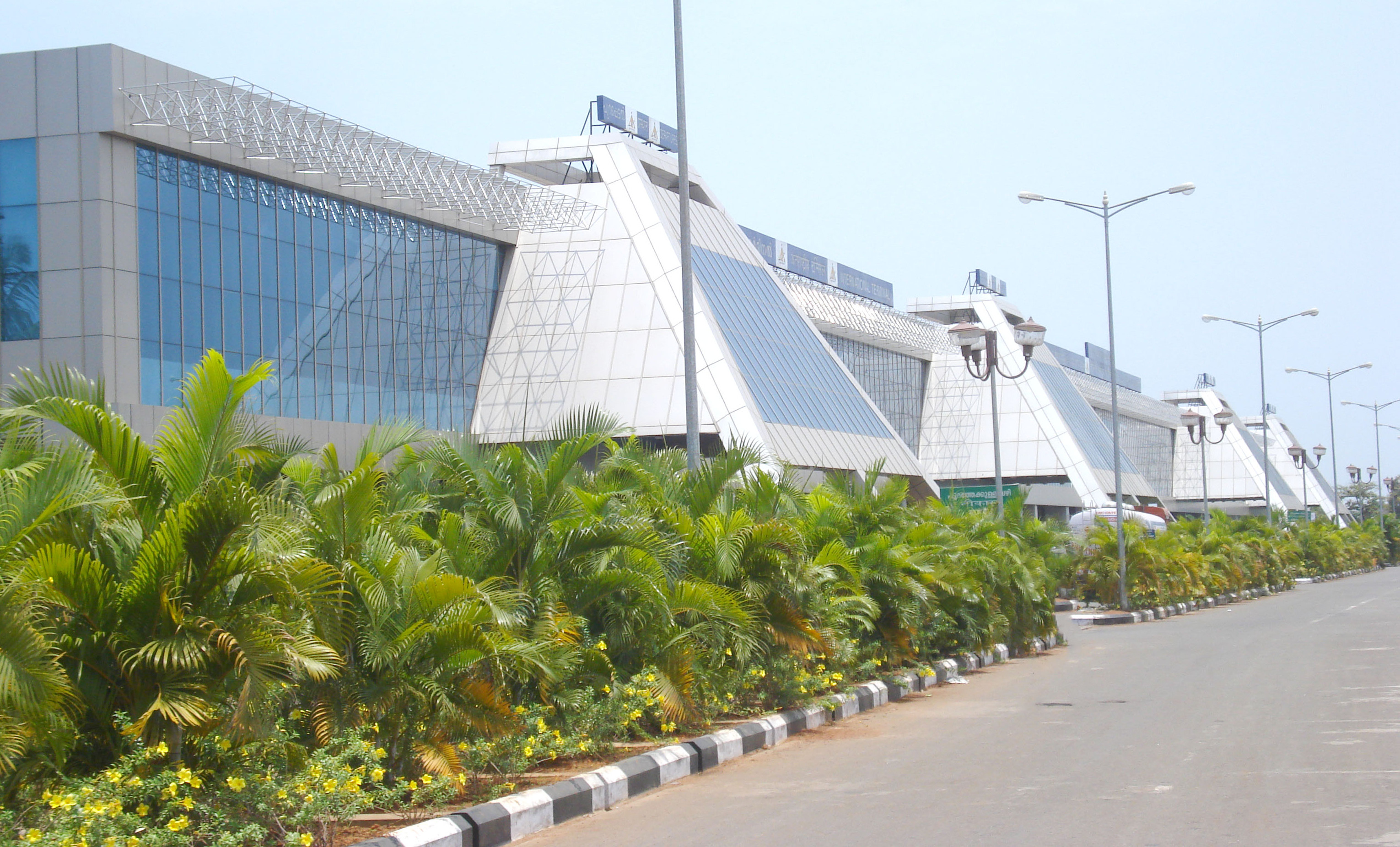
Calicut International Airport

Calicut International Airport (also known as Karipur International Airport) is located about 3 km from the town. Almost all international flights operating from the airport are to Middle East destinations targeting the large NRI population of north Kerala working in the Middle East.

=== Rail ===
Feroke and Parappanangadi are the nearest railway stations.

=== Road ===
Kondotty is well connected to nearby places through roads. National Highway 213 which connects Malappuram with Kozhikode and Palakkad passes through Kondotty.

== Government ==
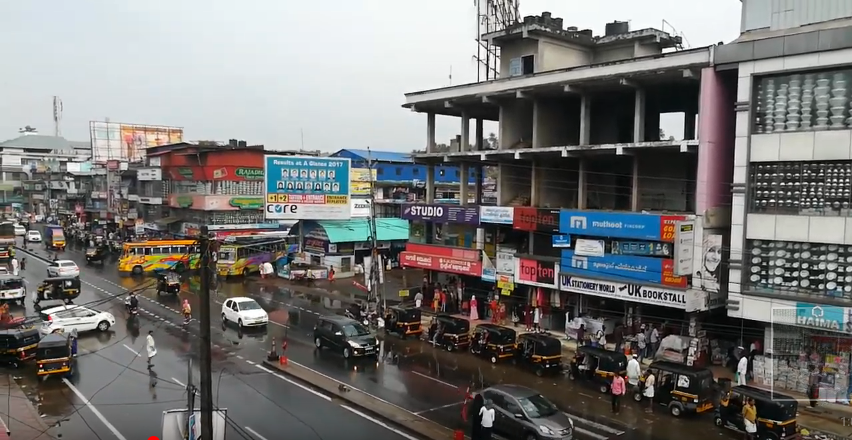
A view of Kondotty town

=== Government ===
- Kerala State Haj Committee (Haj House), Airport Road
- District Panchayath Press, 17th Mile
- Mappila Kala Academy (Maha Kavi Moyinkutty Vaidyar Smarakam), Pandikkad Street
- Kondotty Block Panchayath Office Pandikkad Street
- Kondotty Taluk Headquarters, Block Office Road
- Assistant Educational Office, Pazhayangadi Street
- Office of the Circle Inspector of Police, Main Road
- deputy supridentent of police main road
- Office of the Circle Inspector of Excise, 17th Mile
- Sub Registrar Office, Kurupath Street
- Legal Metrology Office, Kurupath Street
- Kondotty Municipal Office, Pandikkad Street, Kondotty.

=== Other government administrative offices ===
- ICDS Office, EMEA School Road, Thurakkal Street, Kondotty.

=== Citizen service centers ===
- Kondotty Akshaya e Kendra Akshaya project, Hilal Building, bypass road
- BSNL Customer Service Centre, Telephone Exchange Building, Pandikkad Street
- Sub Treasury office, Kuruppath
- (KSEB) Kondotty division office Kaloth

== Education ==
Kondotty is an emerging education hub with many government and non-government schools, colleges and other educational institutions.

=== Schools ===
- PPMHSS Kottukkara|Panakkad Pookoya Thangal Memorial Higher Secondary School (PPMHSS), Kottukkara Street.
- Govt.L.P.School Kondotty, Near Kuruppath
- Govt.U.P.School Kondotty, Kandhakkad, Near Post Office Kondotty
- Govt.L.P.School Thurakkal, Between Calicut Air port road and Thurakkal street.
- Al Hidaya English medium school, Thurakkal
- Bukhari English School, 1st Mile Street.
- E. M. E. A. Higher Secondary School, Thurakkal Street.
- GVHSS Kondotty, Melangadi Street.
- Alungal AMLPS
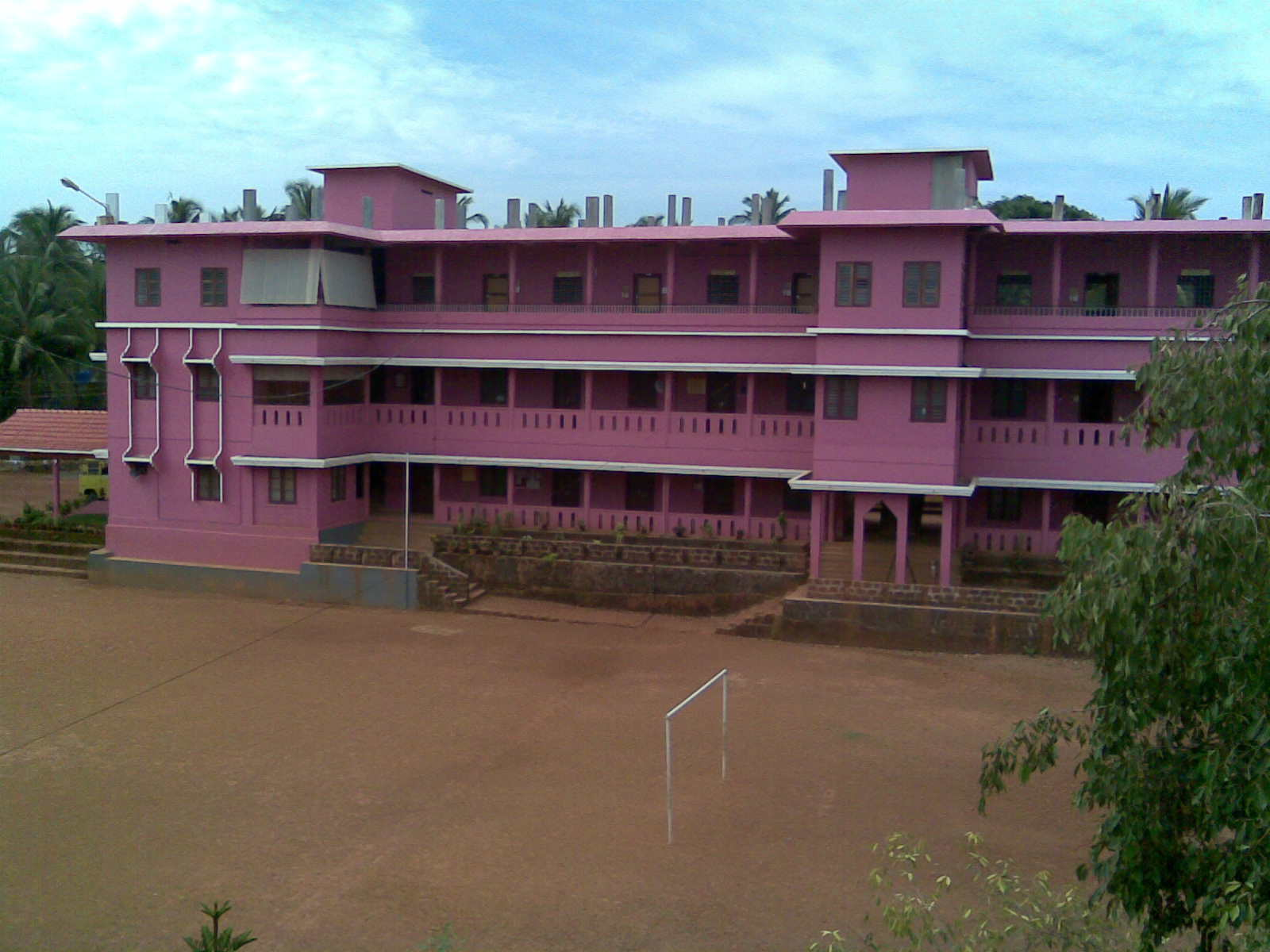
- Markazul Uloom School
- Markazul Uloom Senior Secondary English School, Ekkaparamba Street.
- A.M.L.P School Neerad Street.
- Government UP School Neerad, Muthuvalloor
- Government UP School Neerad Street.
- Floreat international Senior Secondary school Valiyaparamba Street.
- Calicut Airport Senior Secondary School, Karippur Street.

=== Colleges ===
- Blossom College of Arts and Science (affiliated to Calicut University), Neerad Street Kondotty
- E.M.E.A College of Arts and Science (affiliated to Calicut University), Kumminiparamba Street Kondotty
- Government arts and science college Kondotty (GASCK) Vilayil, Kondotty.
- SAFI College Vazhayoor, Kondotty.
- IHRD College Muthuvallur, Kondotty.
- jamia jalaliyya (SMIC) mundakkulam, Kondotty.

=== University ===
- The University of Calicut is located 10 km from Kondotty at Thenjipalam Malappuram Dt.

== Places of interest ==
=== Pazhayangadi Mosque ===
Situated at Kondotty, Pazhayangadi Mosque is believed to date back to the 18th century. It is also called the Kondotty mosque. This mosque is dedicated to a Muslim saint, Muhammad Shah, popularly called as Kondotty Thangal.

=== Maha Kavi Moyinkutty Vaidyar Smaraka ===
The Maha Kavi Moyinkutty Vaidyar Smaraka (Malayalam: മഹാ കവി മോയി൯കുട്ടി വൈദ്യ൪ സ്മാരകം) is a memorial building dedicated to Moyinkutty Vaidyar (1852–1892), often referred to as Mahakavi (great poet), is historically considered one of the most renowned poets of the Mappila pattu genre of Malayalam language.

=== Kondotty Qubba ===
Kondotty Nercha is a week-long festival held every year at Kondotty Qubba, which contains the tomb of the first Thangal, Muhammad Shah. Thousands of devotees attend the Nercha, which consists of certain religious processions. A very elaborate village fair is also arranged during the festival. The festival is organized by Sunni Muslims and Hindus jointly. Certain small Muslim groups of the area like the Salafis boycott the festival because they don't believe in Dargahs.

=== Mini Ooty ===
Mini Ooty is a tourist site in Arimbra Hills about 10 kilometres from Kondotty. It is at a height of 1000 feet above sea level. Mini Ooty attracts a large number of visitors because of its rolling hills and scenic views. The location got its name as it resembles Ooty, one of the famous hill stations in India. There are many stone crushers and plantations atop the hill. There is an old Harijan Colony on the western side of the hill.

=== Poyilikkave Karinkali Temple ===
Poyilikkave Karinkali Temple is a very ancient temple in Nediyiruppu, constructed during the Zamorins period. The headquarter of Zamorins was at Nediyiruppu Swaroopam and connected to that this temple was very important. Worshipping Goddess Karinkali devi and Thalapoli festival is a very important temple ceremony in December of every year.

=== Other landmarks ===
- Thakkiyakkal Rahmaniyya Higher Secondary Madrasa
- Masjidul Fathah, Kondotty Town
- Ayyappa Subramanya Shiva Temple, Pathinezham Mile
- Masjidhul Ihsan, Old Kondotty Road
- Kaloth Hills, Areacode Road
- Masjidhul Qubha (ഖുബാ മസ്ജിദ്) (Kondotty Markkas) near Moyinkutty vydhyar Smarakam (Malayalam: മഹാ കവി മോയി൯കുട്ടി വൈദ്യ൪ സ്മാരകം), Kondotty
- KHASIYARAKAM MASJID

== Notable people ==
- Anas Edathodika - Indian professional footballer
- Hanumankind- Indian Rapper
- Moyinkutty Vaidyar - Indian Poet

== Image gallery ==
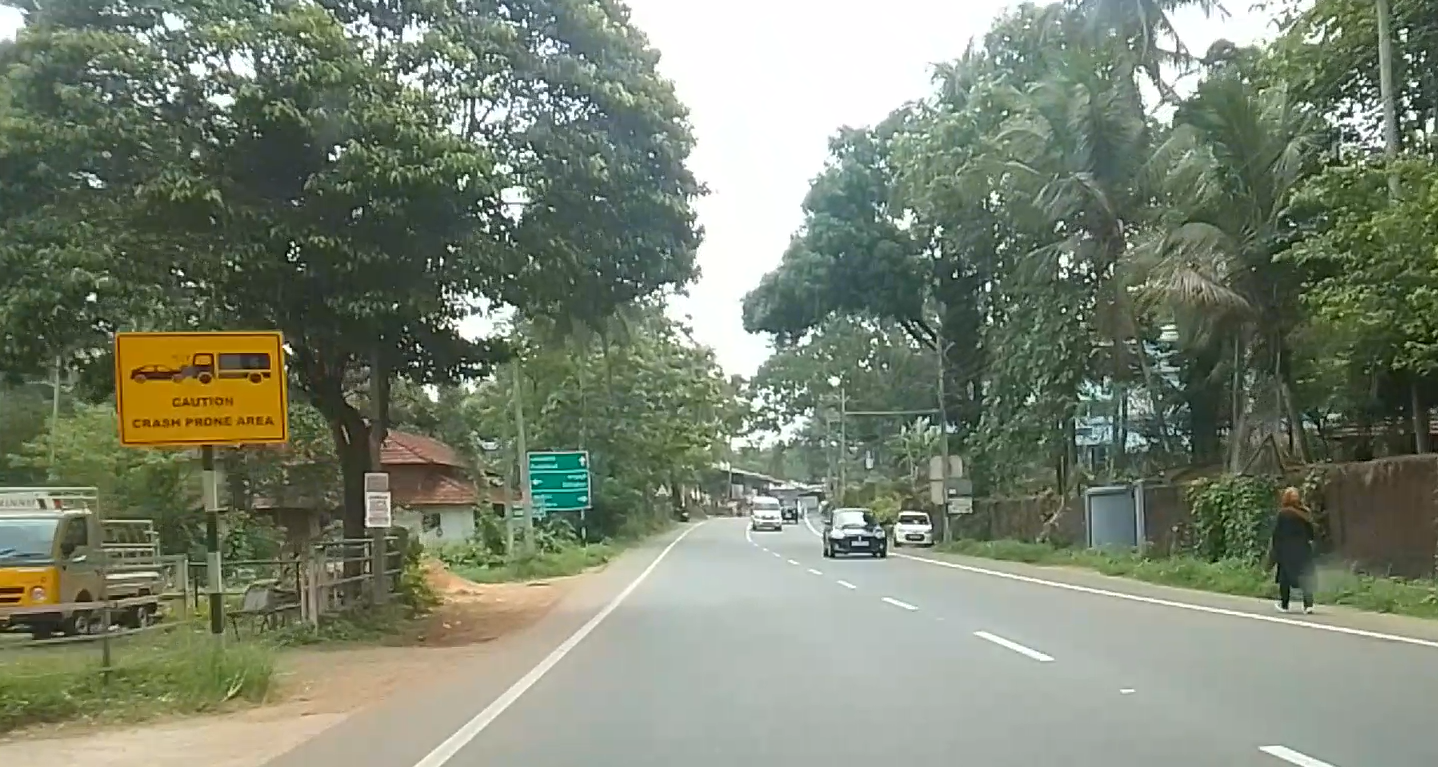
National Highway

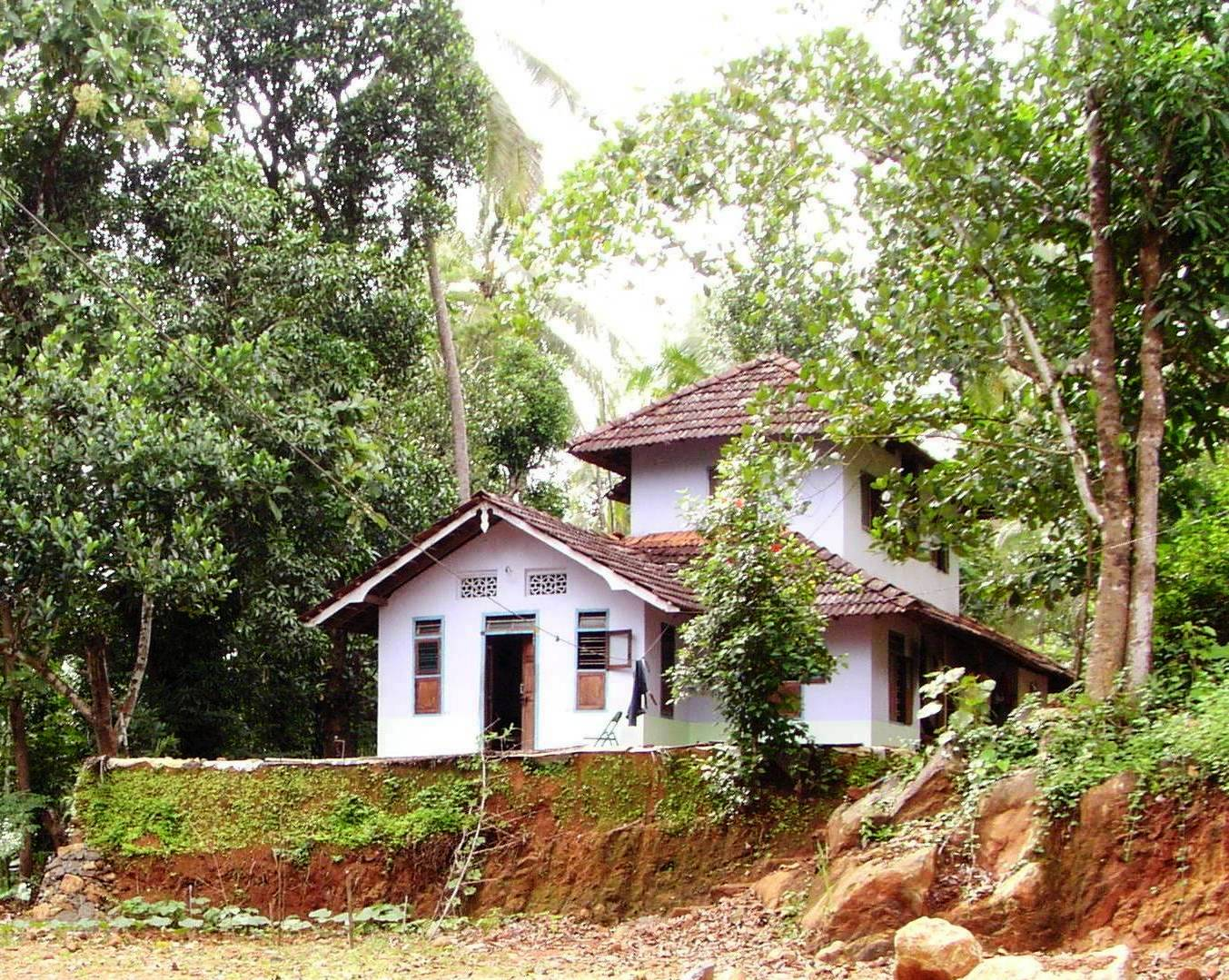
Village house in Kondotty

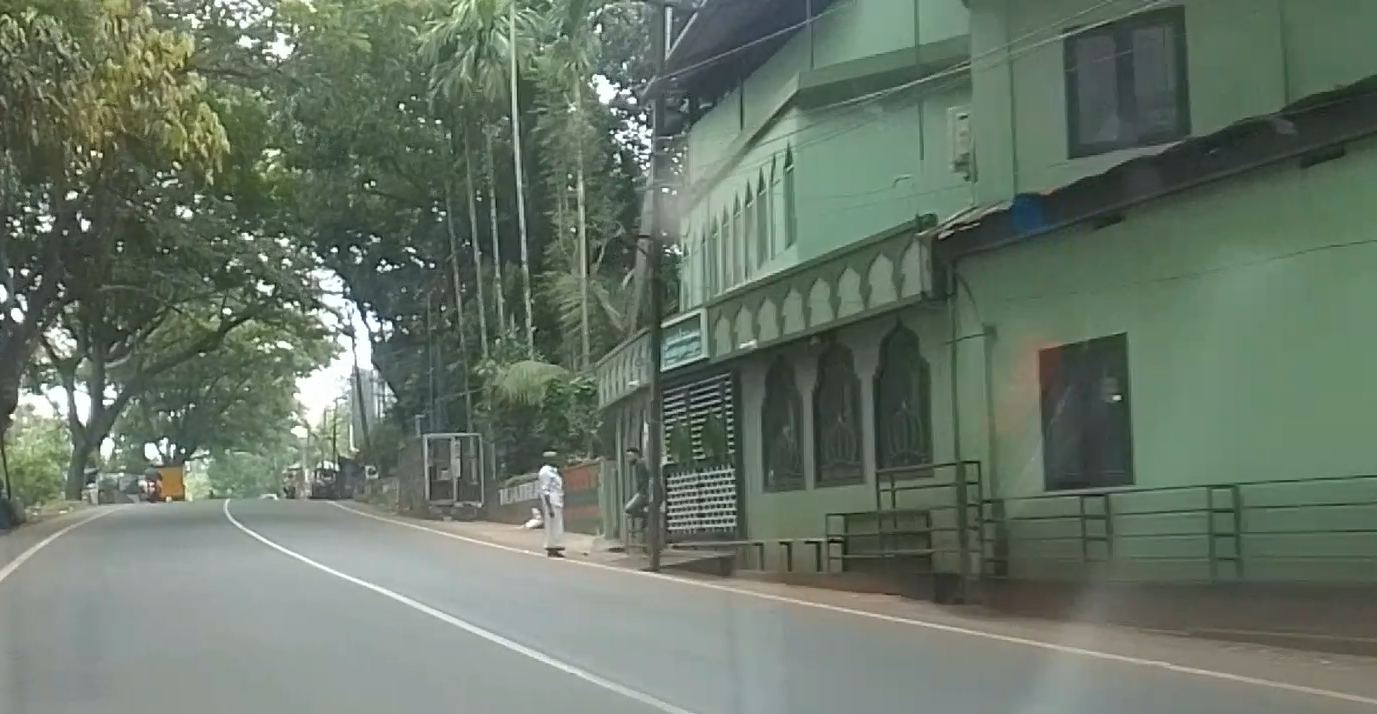
Kondotty Main Road

== See also ==
- Kondotty (State Assembly constituency)
- Areekode
- Kuzhimanna Kizhissery
- Nediyiruppu
- Pulikkal
- Edavannappara
- Omanoor
