= Kutty Ahammed Kutty =

Indian politician (1953–2024)

Minister for Local Government
- In office 2004–2006

Member of the Kerala Legislative Assembly
- In office 1996–2001
- Constituency: Tirurangadi
- In office 2001–2011
- Constituency: Tanur
- In office 1987–1991

Personal details
- Born: 15 January 1953; Malappuram, Kerala, India
- Died: 11 August 2024 (aged 71); Tanur, Kerala, India
- Political party: Indian Union Muslim League
- Spouse: Jahan Ara
- Children: 3
- Profession: Politician

Kutty Ahammed Kutty (January 15, 1953 – August 11, 2024) was an Indian politician and a senior Indian Union Muslim League (IUML) leader. He served as the Minister for Local Government in the First Chandy ministry, the 19th Cabinet of Kerala. He was a member of the Kerala Legislative Assembly from 1987 to 1991 from the Tanur constituency and two times representing the Tirurangadi constituency from 1996 to 2001 and from 2001 to 2011.

== Early life ==
Kutty was born on January 15, 1953, in Malappuram, Kerala. His father was K Saidalikutty Master.

== Political career ==
Kutty's involvement in politics began after he joined a trade union. He went on to become a member of the IUML state executive and served as the State Vice President of the party. He also held roles such as President of the IUML Tanur constituency, Malappuram district President of the Swathanthra Matsya Thozhilali Union, and President of the Tanur Panchayat.

Kutty was first elected to the Kerala Legislative Assembly from the Tanur constituency in the 1987 by-election. He was re-elected from the Turrangadi constituency in 1996 and 2001. During Oommen Chandy’s tenure as Chief Minister from 2004 to 2006, Kutty served as a minister, handling portfolios such as Panchayats, Municipalities and Corporations, Town Planning, and Regional Development Authorities.

He was also the Chairman of the Public Works Standing Committee of the Malappuram District Council and Vice President of the Malappuram District Council. Kutty also served as the IUML Malappuram district secretary and Chairman of SSM Polytechnic College in Tirur.

Kutty retired from active politics after suffering serious injuries in a car accident at Chavara in February 2005.

== Death ==
Kutty died at his Tanur residence on August 11, 2024, at the age of 71 due to age-related health issues. He is survived by his wife, Jahan Ara, two sons, Suhas and Sahabas Ahmed, and a daughter, Suhana.
