= P K Navas =

Indian politician

P. K. Navas
- പി. കെ. നവാസ്
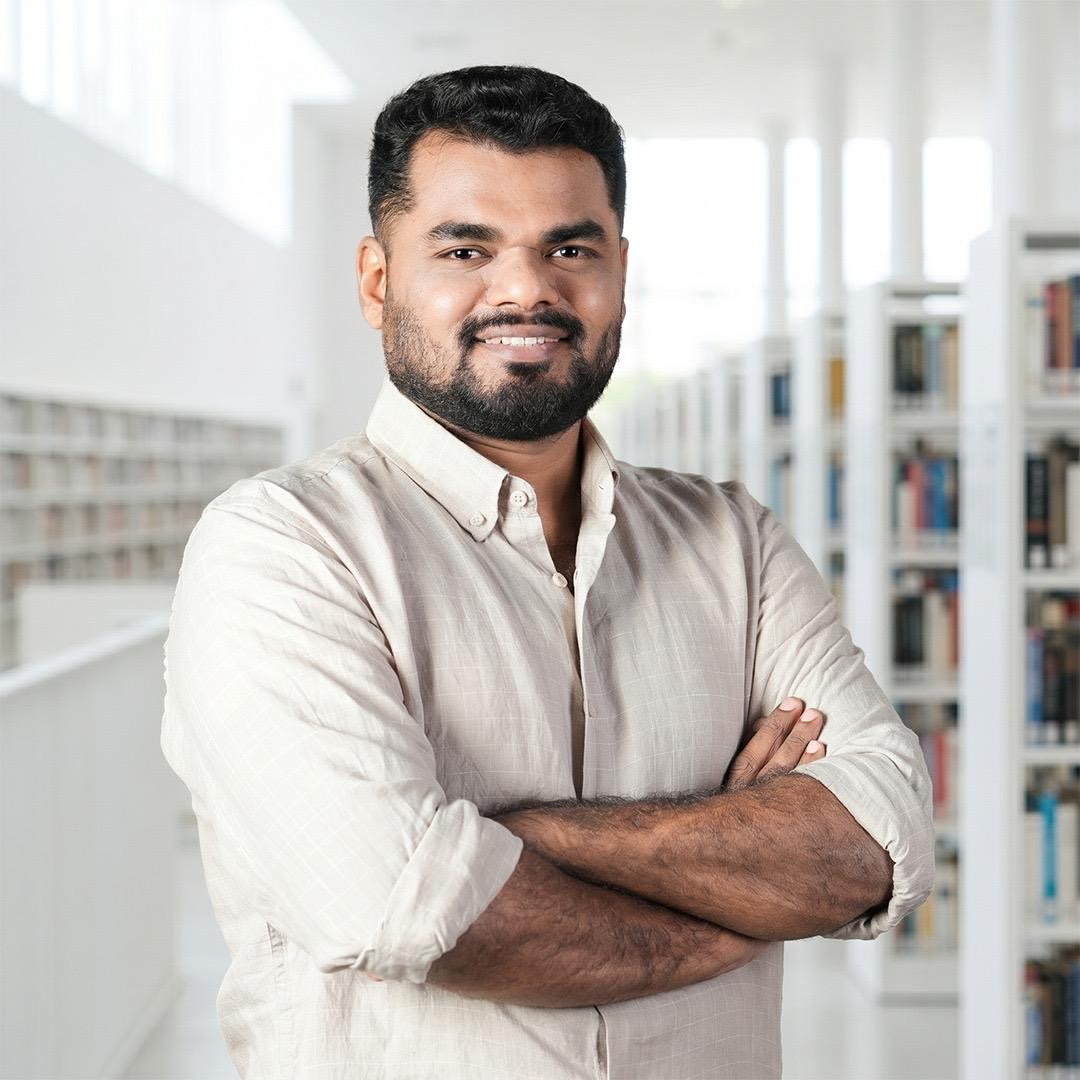

Member of the Kerala Legislative Assembly
- Incumbent
- Assumed office May 2026
- Preceded by: V. Abdurahiman
- Constituency: Tanur

President of MSF Kerala State
- In office 2020–present

Convenor of UDSF
- In office 2023–present

Personal details
- Born: 1991 (age 34–35) Vallikunnu, Malappuram district, Kerala, India
- Education: University of Calicut
- Occupation: Politician, social worker
- Known for: Student politics and Kerala legislative politics
- Website: www.pknavas.in

P. K. Navas (born 1991) is an Indian politician and social worker from Kerala. He is a member of the Kerala Legislative Assembly representing the Tanur Assembly constituency in Malappuram district.

== Early life and education ==
P. K. Navas was born in Vallikunnu in Malappuram district, Kerala. He completed his higher education from the University of Calicut.

== Political career ==
Navas became active in student politics through the Muslim Students Federation. He later became the Kerala State President of the organization in 2020.

In the 2026 Kerala Legislative Assembly election, Navas contested from the Tanur Assembly constituency as the candidate of the Indian Union Muslim League under the UDF alliance. He won the election with 91,992 votes defeating independent candidate Mohamed Sameer T. Thiruthiyil House by a margin of more than 27,000 votes.
