= P. M. A. Sameer =

Indian politician

Member of the Kerala Legislative Assembly
- Incumbent
- Assumed office May 2026
- Preceded by: K. P. A. Majeed
- Constituency: Tirurangadi

Personal details
- Born: Azhinjilam, Malappuram district, Kerala, India
- Party: Indian Union Muslim League
- Education: Farook College
- Profession: Practising company secretary, politician

P. M. A. Sameer is an Indian politician and practising company secretary from Kerala. He is a leader of the Indian Union Muslim League (IUML) and a member of the 16th Kerala Legislative Assembly, representing the Tirurangadi Assembly constituency.

In the 2026 Kerala Legislative Assembly election, he contested as the IUML candidate from Tirurangadi and was elected to the Kerala Legislative Assembly. Sameer received 111,869 votes and defeated Communist Party of India candidate Ajith Koladi by a margin of 63,387 votes.

== Early life and family ==
Sameer is a native of Azhinjilam in Vazhayur Grama Panchayat, in the Malappuram district of Kerala. He is the son of P. M. Ismail Sahib, who served for several years as president of Vazhayur Grama Panchayat and held positions in the Indian Union Muslim League in the Kondotty region.

According to Sameer's official biography, he grew up in a family involved in politics and social service, and his father encouraged him to pursue academic and professional education.

== Education and professional career ==
Sameer holds a postgraduate degree in commerce (M.Com). He later moved to Chennai to study company secretaryship and entered professional practice as a company secretary.

According to his official biography, his professional work included development-related projects connected with institutions and business groups in Kozhikode, including Focus Mall, the HiLITE Group, the Malabar Group and Metro Hospital.

== Political career ==
Sameer became active in organisational work through student politics and participated in the activities of the Muslim Students Federation (MSF) in the Azhinjilam and Vazhayur regions. He later served as the MSF unit president at Farook College and was elected chairman of the Farook College Students' Union.

He subsequently held positions in the Indian Union Muslim League and the Muslim Youth League. These included treasurer of the Vazhayur Panchayat Youth League, secretary of the IUML's Kondotty constituency committee, member of the IUML State Council, secretary of the IUML Malappuram district committee and member of the IUML State Secretariat.

== 2026 Legislative Assembly election ==
In the 2026 Kerala Legislative Assembly election, Sameer contested from the Tirurangadi constituency as the candidate of the United Democratic Front, representing the Indian Union Muslim League. He defeated Communist Party of India candidate Ajith Koladi.

Sameer received 111,869 votes, while Koladi received 48,482 votes, giving Sameer a winning margin of 63,387 votes. His election affidavit recorded his age as 47, his educational qualification as postgraduate and his profession as a practising company secretary.

== Social activities ==
Sameer has been involved in social and charitable initiatives. According to his official biography, he serves as chairman of the Abhayam Charitable Trust, an initiative involved in constructing houses for families without adequate housing in Vazhayur Panchayat.

He has also been associated with the Kondotty Shihab Thangal Dialysis Centre and was involved in fundraising connected with the campaign for the release of Abdul Rahim of Kodampuzha. His official biography also associates him with educational and charitable activities conducted through IFWA, or Ismail Foundation Welfare Activities.

== Association with expatriate organisations ==
According to his official biography, Sameer has provided financial, legal and technical advisory assistance to activities conducted by the Kerala Muslim Cultural Centre in countries including Saudi Arabia, the United Arab Emirates and Qatar.

The same source states that he provided legal and technical assistance to the Suraksha Project, an initiative intended to support the safety and welfare of expatriates.

== Organisational responsibilities ==
Sameer has held the following organisational positions:

- President, MSF Farook College unit
- Chairman, Farook College Students' Union
- Treasurer, Vazhayur Panchayat Youth League
- Secretary, IUML Kondotty constituency committee
- Member, IUML State Council
- Secretary, IUML Malappuram district committee
- Member, IUML State Secretariat

== Other interventions ==
Sameer has also been associated with the following organisational and project-related activities:

- Technical work connected with the Indian Union Muslim League's membership campaign.
- Fundraising and project coordination for the Quaid-e-Millath Centre project in Delhi.
- Fund management and project coordination for the IUML's rehabilitation programme following the Mundakkai and Chooralmala landslides in Wayanad district.
- Responsibilities connected with the financial administration of the Chandrika newspaper.
