= Ummer Bafaki Tangal =

Sayyid Ummer Bafaki Tangal

Member of the Kerala Legislative Assembly
- In office 3 March 1967 – 26 June 1970
- Preceded by: M. P. M. Ahammed Kurikkal
- Succeeded by: C. H. Mohammed Koya
- Constituency: Kondotty
- In office 4 October 1970 – 22 March 1977
- Preceded by: M. Moideenkutty
- Succeeded by: U. A. Beeran
- Constituency: Tanur

Personal details
- Born: 24 November 1921
- Died: 1 August 2008 (aged 86)
- Party: Muslim League
- Spouse: Zainab
- Children: 5 sons, 5 daughters
- Parents: Sayyid Hashim Bafaki (father); Sharifa Rawla (mother)
- As of 26 January, 2021 Source: നിയമസഭ

Sayyid Ummer Bafaki Tangal (24 November 1921 – 1 August 2008) was a politician and former member of the Kerala Legislative Assembly. A nephew to Abdurrahiman Bafaki Tangal, he represented the Muslim League from the Kondotty Assembly constituency to the 3rd Kerala Assembly and from Tanur Assembly constituency to the 4th Assembly. Born on 24 November 1921 to Sayyid Hashim Bafaki and Sharifa Rawla, his wife was Zainab, and he had five sons and five daughters. He completed his primary education from Koyilandy Mathil School and Humayathul Islam High School, Kozhikode and studied the Quran at Madina University.
