= Kondotty Assembly constituency =

Constituency of the Kerala legislative assembly in India

Kondotty
- Constituency No. 33 for the Kerala Legislative Assembly
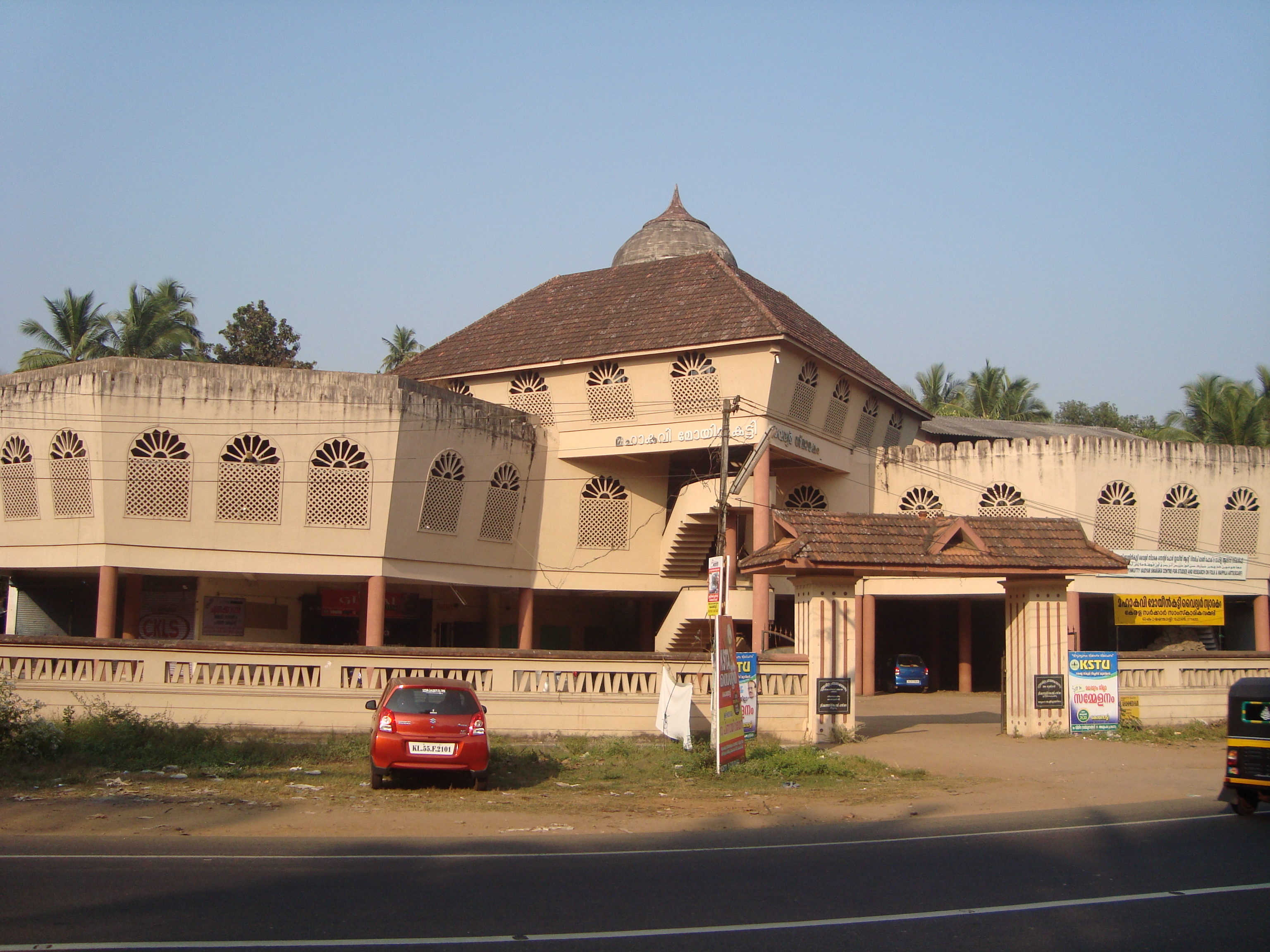
- Maha Kavi Moyinkutty Vaidyar Smarakam in Kondotty Assembly constituency

Constituency details
- Country: India
- Region: South India
- State: Kerala
- District: Malappuram
- Established: 1957
- Total electors: 2,05,261 (2021)
- Reservation: None

Member of Legislative Assembly
- 16th Kerala Legislative Assembly
- Incumbent T.P Asharafali
- Party: IUML
- Alliance: UDF
- Elected year: 2026

Kondotty State assembly constituency is one of the 140 state legislative assembly constituencies in Kerala in southern India. It is also one of the seven state legislative assembly constituencies included in Malappuram Lok Sabha constituency. As of the 2026 Assembly election, the current MLA is T.P Ashrafali of IUML.

== Local self-governed segments ==
Kondotty Assembly constituency is composed of the following local self-governed segments:

| Sl no. | Name | Status (Grama panchayat/Municipality) | Taluk |
|---|---|---|---|
| 1 | Kondotty | Municipality | Kondotty |
| 2 | Vazhayur | Grama panchayat | Kondotty |
| 3 | Vazhakkad | Grama panchayat | Kondotty |
| 4 | Pulikkal | Grama panchayat | Kondotty |
| 5 | Cherukavu | Grama panchayat | Kondotty |
| 6 | Cheekode | Grama panchayat | Kondotty |
| 7 | Muthuvallur | Grama panchayat | Kondotty |

Kondotty (State Assembly constituency)

== Members of Legislative Assembly ==
The following list contains all members of Kerala Legislative Assembly who have represented Kondotty Assembly constituency during the period of various assemblies:

| Election | Niyama Sabha | Name | Party | Tenure |
|---|---|---|---|---|
| 1957 | 1st | M. P. M. Ahamed Kurikkal | Indian Union Muslim League | 1957–1960 |
| 1960 | 2nd | M. P. M. Ahamed Kurikkal | Indian Union Muslim League | 1960–1965 |
| 1967 | 3rd | Ummer Bafaki Tangal | Indian Union Muslim League | 1967–1970 |
| 1970 | 4th | C. H. Mohammed Koya | Indian Union Muslim League | 1970–1977 |
| 1977 | 5th | P. Seethi Haji | Indian Union Muslim League | 1977–1980 |
| 1980 | 6th | P. Seethi Haji | Indian Union Muslim League | 1980–1982 |
| 1982 | 7th | P. Seethi Haji | Indian Union Muslim League | 1982–1987 |
| 1987 | 8th | P. Seethi Haji | Indian Union Muslim League | 1987–1991 |
| 1991 | 9th | K. K. Abu | Indian Union Muslim League | 1991–1996 |
| 1996 | 10th | P. K. K. Bava | Indian Union Muslim League | 1996–2001 |
| 2001 | 11th | K. N. A. Khader | Indian Union Muslim League | 2001–2006 |
| 2006 | 12th | K. Muhammedunni Haji | Indian Union Muslim League | 2006–2011 |
| 2011 | 13th | K. Muhammedunni Haji | Indian Union Muslim League | 2011–2016 |
| 2016 | 14th | T. V. Ibrahim | Indian Union Muslim League | 2016–2021 |
| 2021 | 15th | T. V. Ibrahim | Indian Union Muslim League | 2021-2026 |
| 2026 | 16th | T. P. Ashrafali | Indian Union Muslim League | Incumbent |

== Election results ==
Percentage change (±%) denotes the change in the number of votes from the immediate previous election.

=== 2026 ===
2026 Kerala Legislative Assembly election: Kondotty
| Party | Candidate | Votes | % | ±% |
|---|---|---|---|---|
| IUML | T. P. Ashrafali | 114,997 | 60.01 | ▲9.59 |
| CPI(M) | Dr. P. Jiji | 58,980 | 30.78 | ▼8.88 |
| BJP | P. Subramanian | 13,994 | 7.30 | ▲0.53 |
| SDPI | Abdul Khader Bichava | 2,231 | | |
| NOTA | None of the above | 982 | 0.51 | ▲0.17 |
| BSP | Keeran N. K. | 441 | | |
| Margin of victory | | 56,017 | | |
| Turnout | | 1,91,625 | | |
| IUML hold | | Swing | | |

=== 2021 ===
There were 2,05,261 registered voters in the constituency for the 2021 Kerala Assembly election.

2021 Kerala Legislative Assembly election: Kondotty
| Party | Candidate | Votes | % | ±% |
|---|---|---|---|---|
| IUML | T. V. Ibrahim | 82,759 | 50.42% | ▲3.84 |
| LDF | Kattiparuthy Sulaiman Haji | 65,093 | 39.66% | ▲0.20 |
| BJP | Sheeba Unnikrishnan | 11,114 | 6.77% | ▼1.60 |
| WPOI | Razak Paleri | 2,579 | 1.57% | Steady |
| BSP | T. Sivadasan | 908 | 0.55% | ▲0.55 |
| Independent | Sulaiman Haji | 905 | 0.55% | N/A |
| NOTA | None of the above | 554 | 0.34% | ▼0.05 |
| Independent | C. V. Ibrahim | 233 | 0.14% | N/A |
| Margin of victory | | 17,666 | 10.76% | ▲3.64 |
| Turnout | | 1,64,145 | 79.97% | ▲0.57 |
| IUML hold | | Swing | ▲3.84 | |

=== 2016 ===
There were 1,88,358 registered voters in Kondotty Assembly constituency for the 2016 Kerala Assembly election.

2016 Kerala Legislative Assembly election: Kondotty
| Party | Candidate | Votes | % | ±% |
|---|---|---|---|---|
| IUML | T. V. Ibrahim | 69,668 | 46.58% | ▼10.24 |
| LDF | K. P. Beeran Kutty | 59,014 | 39.46% | − |
| BJP | K. Ramachandran | 12,513 | 8.37% | ▲2.65 |
| SDPI | Nazarudheen Elamaram | 3,667 | 2.45% | ▲0.76 |
| WPOI | Saleem Vazhakkad | 2,344 | 1.57% | − |
| NOTA | None of the above | 581 | 0.39% | − |
| PDP | Abdul Gaffoor Vavoor | 566 | 0.38% | − |
| Independent | K. P. Veeran Kutty | 442 | 0.30% | − |
| Independent | Sulfikar Ali Ambal | 316 | 0.21% | − |
| Independent | Kadeeja | 267 | 0.18% | − |
| Independent | Ibrahim Cholakkad | 176 | 0.12% | − |
| Margin of victory | | 10,654 | 7.12% | ▼16.40 |
| Turnout | | 1,49,554 | 79.40% | ▲3.68 |
| IUML hold | | Swing | ▼10.24 | |

=== 2011 ===
There were 1,58,057 registered voters in the constituency for the 2011 election.

2011 Kerala Legislative Assembly election: Kondotty
| Party | Candidate | Votes | % | ±% |
|---|---|---|---|---|
| IUML | K. Muhammedunni Haji | 67,998 | 56.82% | |
| CPI(M) | P. C. Naushad | 39,849 | 33.30% | |
| BJP | Kumari Sukumaran | 6,840 | 5.72% | |
| SDPI | Abdu Rahman P. T. | 2,026 | 1.69% | |
| Independent | T. K. Mammunni Haji | 1,817 | 1.52% | − |
| BSP | E. P. Madhavan | 730 | 0.61% | |
| Independent | Noushad P. | 415 | 0.35% | |
| Margin of victory | | 28,149 | 23.52% | |
| Turnout | | 1,19,675 | 75.72% | |
| IUML hold | | Swing | | |

== See also ==
- Kondotty
- Malappuram district
- List of constituencies of the Kerala Legislative Assembly
- 2016 Kerala Legislative Assembly election
