= Muslim Students Federation (Kerala unit) =

Indian student organization

MSF (Kerala)
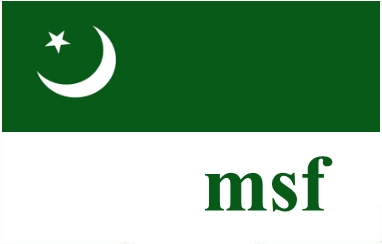
- Formation: 15 October 1958; 68 years ago
- Founded at: Alappuzha; Kerala
- Type: Students Political organization
- Headquarters: League House; Kozhikode
- President: P K Navas
- General Secretary: CK Najaf
- Treasurer: Ashar Perumukk
- Affiliations: Indian Union Muslim League
- Website: msfkerala.org

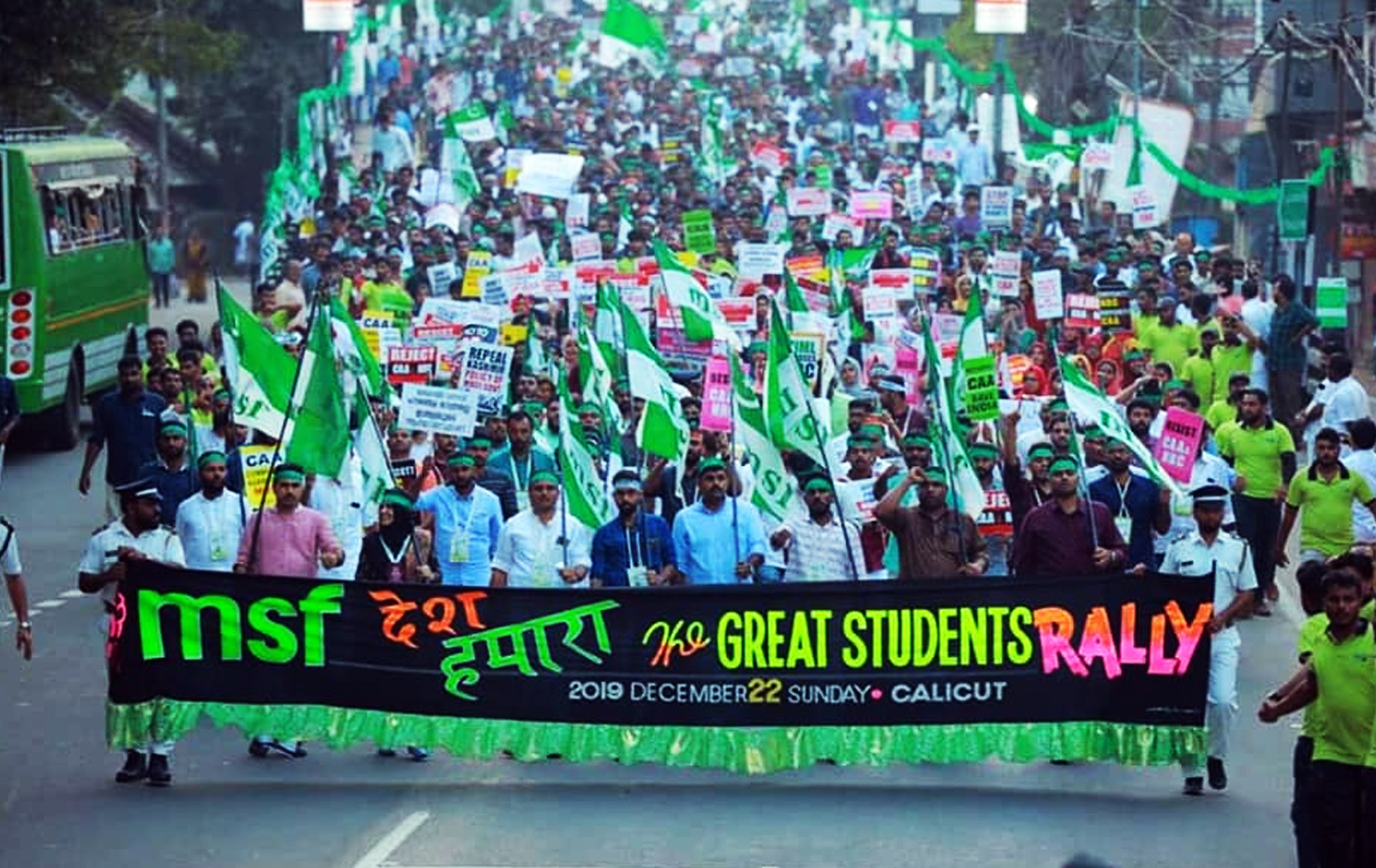
A march by Muslim Students Federation at Calicut (2019)

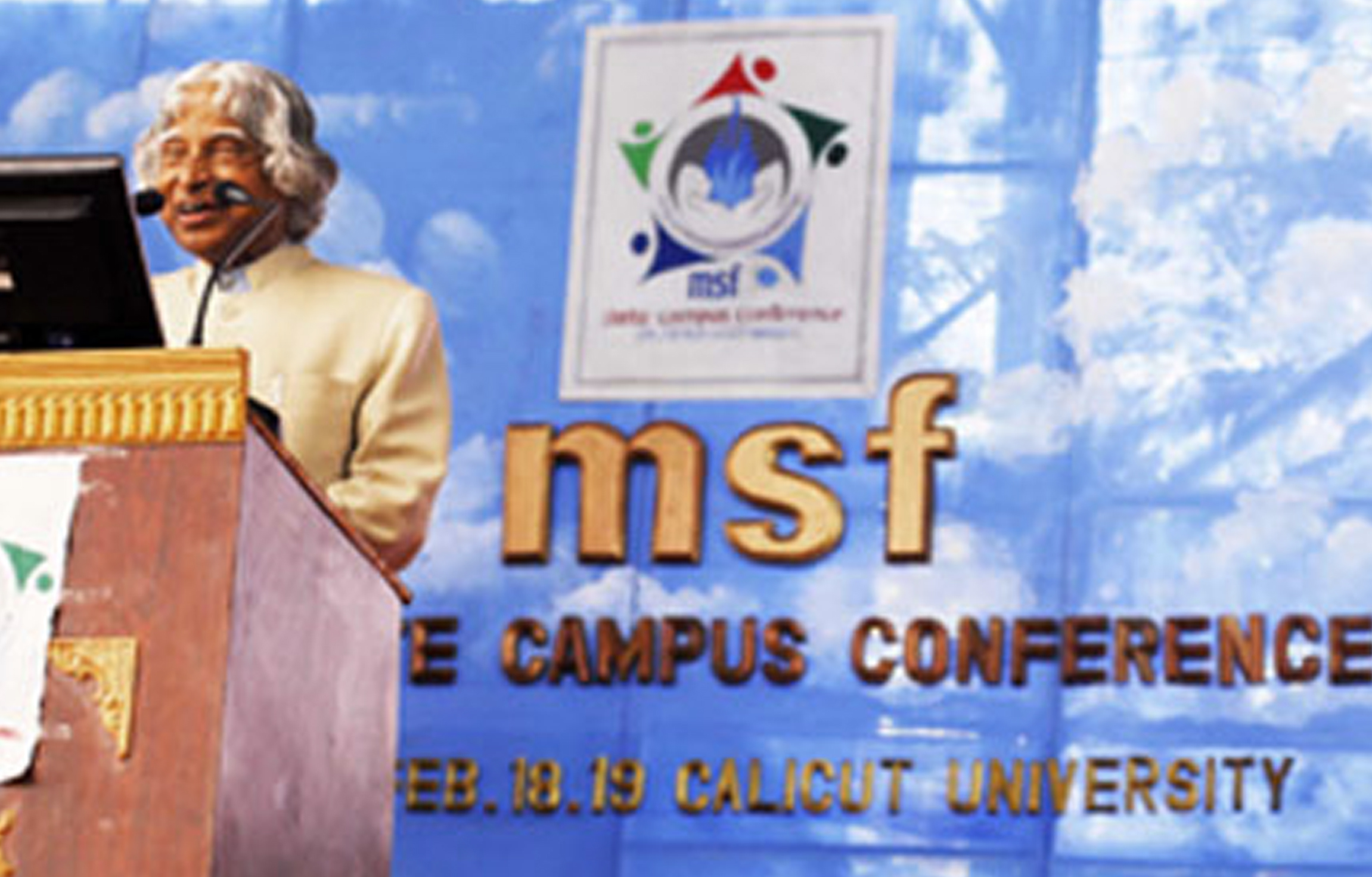
Former President of the India A. P. J. Abdul Kalam inaugurats the M S F State Campus Conference in 2011.

The Muslim Students Federation (abbreviated as the MSF), in Kerala, is the student wing of Indian Union Muslim League in Kerala, India. MSF in Kerala is currently headed by P K Navas (President), C. K Najaf (General Secretary), and Ashar Perumukk (Treasurer).

Muslim Students Federation is principally active in all state-run universities in Kerala and in affiliated colleges. It is the largest Muslim students organisation in Kerala. Indian Union Muslim League leaders C. H. Mohammed Koya, Minister of Education in various Kerala Governments and E. Ahamed, Union Minister of State, Ministry of External Affairs, were associated with the Muslim Students Federation.

The work being done by the Kerala State Committee of the Muslim Students Federation which is entering the age of 65 in the Kerala has been praised by all. The victory journey that msf movement is going on by leading the students' rights struggles, giving helping hands to the helpless students and leading the educational activities is a proud one.

== History ==
Local units of the Muslim Students Federation were active in Kerala in the 1930s. Malabar District M. S. F. was organised by Muslim League leader K. M. Seethi Sahib in 1942.

Kerala unit of the M. S .F. was formed at Alappuzha on 15 October 1958.

Former office bearers
Year	Conference location	President	General secretary
British India
1936	Malabar District	K. M. Seethi Sahib	C. H. Mohammed Koya
1942	Calicut	Ismail	K. M. Seethi Sahib
Modern Kerala
1958	Alleppey	E. Ahamed	C. M. Kutty
1971	Calicut	C. Mammutty	P. K. Kunhalikutty
1976–1978	Calicut	P. Shaduli Sahib	
1979	Calicut	Adv. Habeeb Rahman	K.M. Koyamu
1990	Calicut	C. Mammutty	M. K. Muneer
1992	Calicut	T. V. Ibrahim	TT ismail
1996	Calicut	P. M. Sadikali	C. K. Subair
2004	Malappuram	M. A. Samad	P. K. Firos
2010	Calicut	P.K Firos	T. P. Asharafali
2012	Trivandrum	T. P. Asharafali	P. G. Muhammed
2017	Kannur	Mishab Keezhariyur	M. P. Navas
2020	Calicut	PK Navas	Latheef Thurayoor
2021	Malappuram	PK Navas	Abid Arangadan
2022	Malappuram	PK Navas	C. K. Najaf

== MSF State Office bearers ==
Current office bearers
Name	Designation
P K Navas	President
CK Najaf	General Secretary
Ashar Perumukku	Treasure
Sharafudheen Pilakkal	Vice President
KT Raoof	Vice President
Faris Fookottoor	Vice President
Shajeer Iqbal	Vice President
Bilal Rasheed	Vice President
Adv Althaf Subair	Vice President
Firos Pallath	Vice President
Anas ethirthod	Vice President
PH Ayisha Banu	Vice President
Swahib Muhammad	Vice President
V.M Rashad	Secretary
PA Javad	Secretary
Al resin	Secretary
Adv. Munawwar Sadath	Secretary
Irshad mogral	Secretary
Noufal Kulappada	Secretary
Shakir Parayil	Secretary
Rumaisa Rafeeq	Secretary
Adv.K Thohani	Secretary

== Students’ Union in University of Calicut ==
Current office bearers
Name	Designation	Organization	College
P.K. Shifana	Chairperson	MSF	KKTM Government College
Sufiyan Villan	General Secretary	MSF	Farook College
A.C. Muhammed Irfan	Vice-chairman	MSF	Farook College

== See also ==
- Indian Union Muslim League
- Muslim Youth League
- msf Haritha
- UDSF
