= Baithurahma =

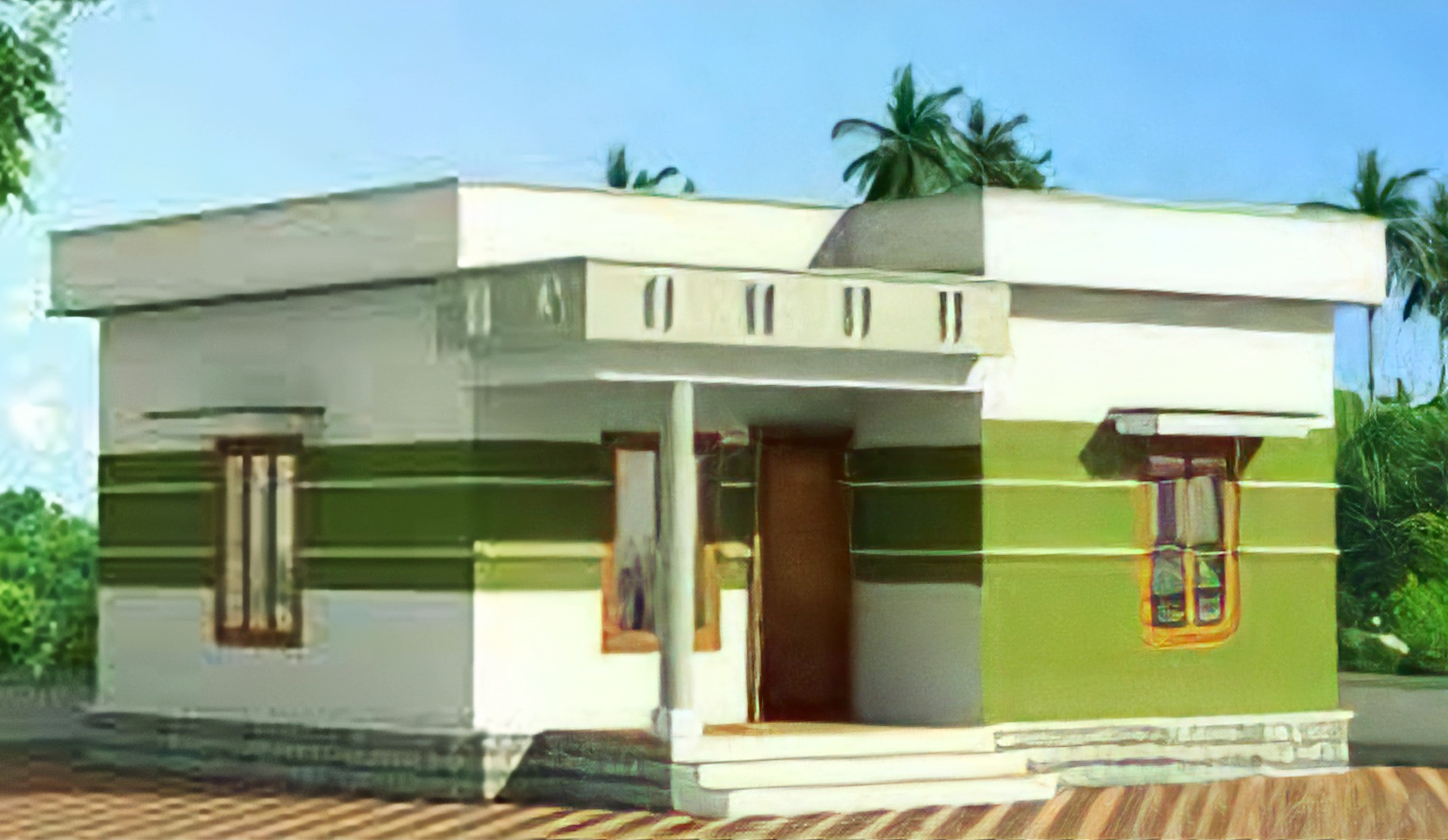
- Baithurahma (house of mercy)
- Mission statement: Housing for poor people irrespective of community.
- Commercial?: NO,
- Type of project: Nonprofit organization
- Products: Housing
- Founder: Syed Sadiqali Shihab Thangal
- Country: India
- Key people: Sayyid Munavvar Ali Shihab Thangal
- Budget: Kerala Muslim Cultural Centre, Indian Union Muslim League
- Status: active

Baithurahma (Malayalam: ബൈത്തു റഹ്മ, Arabic بیت الرحمة ('house of mercy') is a welfare scheme operating in Kerala, Andhra Pradesh, Uttar Pradesh, Tamil Nadu & Jharkhand. It is a housing project originally started by the IUML in Malappuram district to provide housing for poor people irrespective of community.

== History ==
Indian Union Muslim League Malappuram District committee originally planned to construct 20 houses for poor people in 2011 in memory of Panakkad Syed Muhammedali Shihab Thangal and named this project as "Baithu Rahma (House of Mercy). The overwhelmingly positive responses from the public and from within the party promoted the party to scale the programme up and extend it to other states.

== Project completed ==
Nearly 9,200 houses have been constructed in the state of Kerala, which include those built through Pravasi Baithu Rahma Scheme of IUML’s expatriates outfit Kerala Muslim Cultural Centre. Each house costs Rs 6.5 lakh-Rs 10 lakh. Baithurahma takes over every element of the organization

== Criteria for approval ==
The criteria for selection look beyond community or political affiliation. select beneficiaries based on economical status.
