= P. K. Abdu Rabb =

Indian politician

P.K. Abdu Rabb
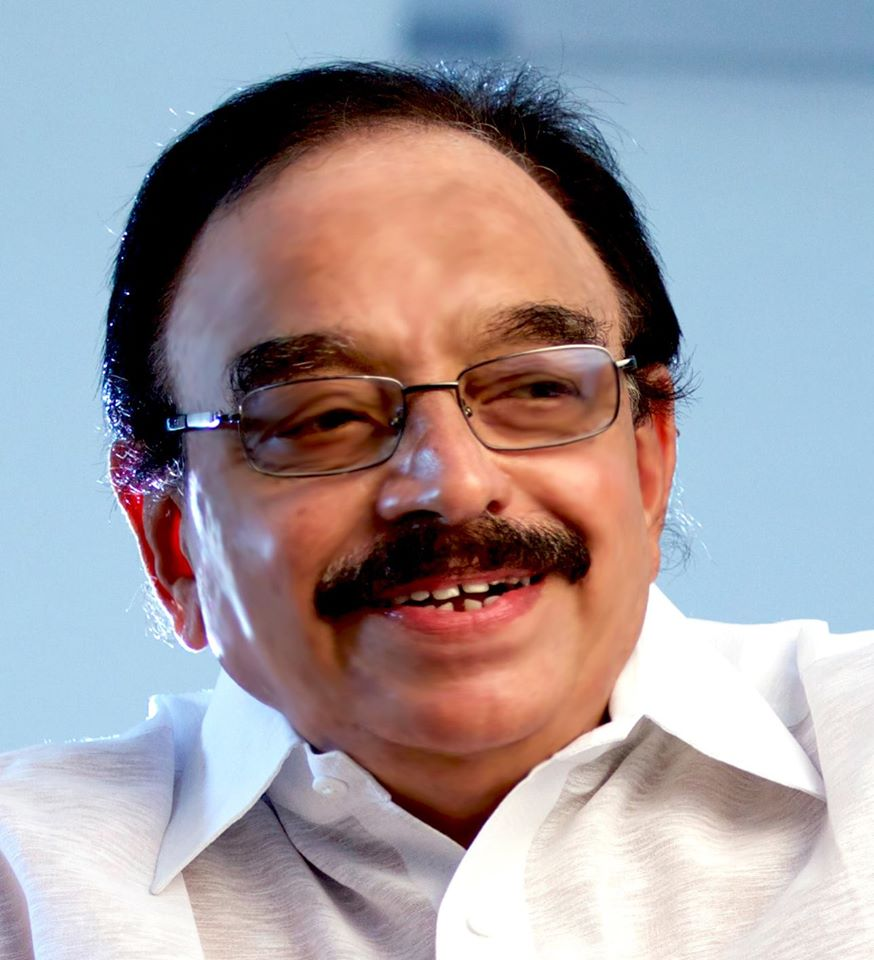

Minister for Education, Government of Kerala
- In office 18 May 2011 – 19 May 2016
- Chief minister: Oommen Chandy
- Preceded by: M. A. Baby
- Succeeded by: C. Raveendranath (General education); K.T. Jaleel (Higher education)

Member of Legislative Assembly, Kerala
- In office 1996–2006
- Preceded by: Kutty Ahammed Kutty
- Succeeded by: Abdurahiman Randathani
- Constituency: Tanur
- In office 2006–2011
- Preceded by: Ishaq Kurikkal
- Succeeded by: M. Ummer
- Constituency: Manjeri
- In office 2011–2021
- Preceded by: Kutty Ahammed Kutty
- Succeeded by: K. P. A. Majeed
- Constituency: Tirurangadi

President of Parappanangadi Gram Panchayat
- In office 1988–2000

Personal details
- Born: May 15, 1948 (age 78) Parappanangadi, Malappuram district, Kerala
- Party: Indian Union Muslim League
- Parent: K. Avukader Kutty Naha (father)

P. K. Abdu Rabb is an Indian politician and a former member of Kerala Legislative Assembly from the Indian Union Muslim League who served as Kerala's minister for education during the second Oommen Chandy ministry. He represented the Tirurangadi constituency of Malappuram district in Kerala.

== Early life ==
P.K. Abdu Rabb is the son of the former deputy chief minister of Kerala, K. Avukader Kutty Naha. He gained a master's degree in English Literature.

== Green chalkboards in schools ==
He experimented with "green boards" in Malappuram, asserting that such boards are the international norm.

== See also ==
- Government of Kerala
- Kerala Ministers
