= Kerala Students' Union =

Indian student organisation

- Abbreviation: KSU
- Formation: 1957; 69 years ago
- Founded at: Alappuzha, Kerala, India
- Type: Students political organisation
- Headquarters: Thiruvananthapuram
- Official language: Malayalam; English
- President: Aloshious Xavier
- Vice Presidents: M. J. Yadhukrishnan; Arun Rajendran; Muhammad Shammas; Ann Sebastian
- Parent organization: National Students' Union of India (NSUI)
- Affiliations: Indian National Congress; National Students' Union of India; Kerala Pradesh Congress Committee
- Website: ksu.org.in

The Kerala Students' Union, abbreviated as KSU is the student wing of the Indian National Congress, in Kerala, India.

KSU was founded in 1957 at Alappuzha, with M. A. John as its main organiser and Vayalar Ravi as its founding general secretary. The original group consisted of M. A. John, Vayalar Ravi, George Tharakan and A. A. Samad. It functioned as the student wing of the Pradesh Congress Committee. While Ravi was the president, KSU took a leading role in the opposition campaign against the communist state government. KSU sought to challenge the near-monopoly of the communist-led AISF over campus politics at the time.

KSU entered the centre stage of student politics in Kerala with the "Orana Samaram", a strike demanding travel concessions for students in buses and boats owned by the state. KSU also played a key role in the movement that toppled the communist state government. Under the Presidency of K. M. Abhijith, KSU raised a strong protest against the PSC examination scandal involving SFI leaders from University College, Thiruvananthapuram, and initiated the re-establishment of KSU unit under the leadership of Amal Chandra after a gap of almost 20 years. On 11 March 2025, KSU organised a "Campus Jagaran Yatra" from Kasaragod to Thiruvananthapuram, emphasising the urgent need to eliminate drug mafias from campuses.

	President
1	George Tharakan
2	A. C. Jose
3	Vayalar Ravi
4	A. K. Antony
5	Oommen Chandy
6	Kadannappalli Ramachandran
7	V. M. Sudheeran
8	M. M. Hassan
9	Thiruvanchoor Radhakrishnan
10	P. M. Suresh Babu
11	G. Karthikeyan
12	Benny Behanan
13	Cherian Philip
14	M Murali
15	Ramesh Chennithala
16	P. T. Thomas
17	Joseph Vazhackan
18	T. Sharatchandra Prasad
19	Punalur Madhu
20	K. C. Venugopal
21	J. Joseph
22	Jaison Joseph
23	Satheeshan Pacheni
24	P. C. Vishnunadh
25	Hibi Eden
26	Shafi Parambil
27	V. S. Joy
28	K. M. Abhijith
29	Aloshious Xavier Adimali

== NSUI ==
KSU emerged as the largest political force at high schools and colleges in the state by the early 1960s. KSU became the main force in establishing the National Students' Union of India, the new students wing of the Indian National Congress.

NSUI, the student wing of the Indian National Congress (INC or Congress), was established on 9 April 1971. The organisation was founded by Indira Gandhi after merging the Kerala Students' Union and the West Bengal State Chhatra Parishad to form a national students' organisation.

== See also ==
- The United Democratic Students' Front (UDSF)

== External Sources ==
- "Kerala Students Union opens unit in University College". The Hindu.
