= V. Abdurahiman =

Minister for Sports

V. Abdurahiman Minister, Kerala
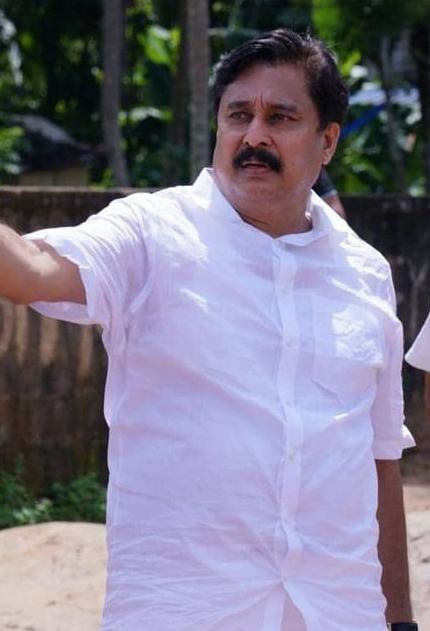

Minister for Sports, Wakf and Haj Pilgrimage, Posts and Telegraph, Railways Government of Kerala
- In office 20 May 2021 – 23 May 2026
- Chief minister: Pinarayi Vijayan
- Preceded by: E. P. Jayarajan; K. T. Jaleel

Member of Kerala Legislative Assembly
- In office May 2016 – May 2026
- Preceded by: Abdurahiman Randathani
- Succeeded by: P K Navas
- Constituency: Tanur

Personal details
- Born: 5 June 1962 (age 64) Tirur, Malappuram district, Kerala, India
- Party: CPI(M) (since 2023) Independent (LDF-supported, 2016–2023) INC (former)
- Other political affiliations: Left Democratic Front
- Spouse: Smt. Shajida Rahman

V. Abdurahiman (born 5 June 1962) is an Indian politician and businessman who served as the Minister for Sports, Wakf and Haj Pilgrimage, Posts & Telegraphs, Railways of Kerala from 2021 to 2026. He was a Member of the Kerala Legislative Assembly representing Tanur from 2016 to 2026. He was also the LDF nominee for Lok Sabha in Ponnani during the 2014 Indian general election. He is a member of the National Secular Conference party.

== Early life ==
V. Abdurahiman is professionally a businessperson and is married to Smt.Shajida Rahman. His birthplace is Pookayil, Tirur, a town in Malappuram district in the Indian state of Kerala. It was often remarked that, He was greatly fond of ice creams earning him the nickname, "Thoopal Icecream".

== Politics ==
Abdurahiman was a Congress Leader. He served as a Municipal Councilor in Tirur Municipality for 15 years. He held various positions including Kerala Pradesh Congress Committee executive committee member and former vice-chairman in Tirur Municipal Council. Later he left Indian National Congress.

In the 2014 Indian general election, he contested at Ponnani constituency as an LDF independent candidate and was defeated by the sitting MP E. T. Muhammed Basheer. In the 2016 Kerala Legislative Assembly election, he won from Tanur constituency as a LDF independent candidate. In 2021, he retained the seat as a LDF Independent.

== Controversy ==
In November 2020, Abdurahiman made an alleged anti-tribal remark during a press conference against Tirur MLA C Mammutty, inviting protests from tribal activists in Kerala. In January 2023, he dragged himself into a controversy after making a comment on the government's decision to impose an 8% entertainment tax on tickets for the India-Sri Lanka one-day international hosted at the Karyavattom cricket ground. He said that those starving and hard-pressed to afford the tax on tickets best skip the match. This sparked a controversy.
