= List of deputy chief ministers of Kerala =

Deputy Leader of the executive of the Government of Kerala

Deputy Chief Minister of Kerala
- Kēraḷa Upamukhyamantri
- Seal of Government of Kerala
- Incumbent; Vacant since 25 March 1987
- Abbreviation: DCM
- Member of: Kerala Cabinet; Kerala Council of Ministers; Kerala Legislative Assembly
- Nominator: Chief Minister of Kerala
- Appointer: Governor of Kerala
- Inaugural holder: R. Sankar (1960–1962)
- Formation: 1 November 1956; 69 years ago

The deputy chief minister of Kerala, an executive appointed by Governor, is a member of the Kerala Cabinet, part of the Kerala Council of Ministers, headed by the chief minister. The deputy chief minister is the second highest ranking member of the Cabinet. The position of deputy chief minister is not explicitly defined or mentioned in the Constitution of India. However, the Supreme Court of India has stated that the appointment of deputy chief ministers is not unconstitutional. The court has clarified that a deputy chief minister, for all practical purposes, remains a minister in the council of ministers headed by the chief minister and does not draw a higher salary or perks compared to other ministers.During the absence of the chief minister, the deputy-chief minister may chair cabinet meetings and lead the assembly majority. Various deputy chief ministers have also taken the oath of secrecy in line with the one that chief minister takes. This oath has also sparked controversies.

== History ==
The office has since been occupied only thrice, having been occupied for a few years out of the 65 years since its inception:

- The first deputy chief minister of Kerala was the Indian National Congress leader R. Sankar, who was also Minister for Finance in 1960 - 62 Pattom A. Thanu Pillai ministry (Joint Front).
- The second deputy chief minister of Kerala was the Indian Union Muslim League leader C. H. Mohammed Koya, with Congress leader K. Karunakaran as the Chief Minister (U D F).
- The third and last deputy chief minister was the Indian Union Muslim League leader K. Avukader Kutty Naha, who took on the role from 1983 to 1987 in Karunakaran's U D F government after demise of Koya.

== List of deputy chief ministers of Kerala ==
#	Deputy Chief Minister	Party	Portrait	Term of office			Chief Minister	Party of Chief Minister
#	Deputy Chief Minister	Party	Portrait	From	To	Days in office	Chief Minister	Party of Chief Minister
1	R. Sankar	Indian National Congress		22 February 1960	26 September 1962	2 years, 216 days	Pattom A. Thanu Pillai	Indian National Congress
2	CH Mohammed Koya	Indian Union Muslim League		28 December 1981	17 March 1982	79 days	K. Karunakaran	Indian National Congress
2	CH Mohammed Koya	Indian Union Muslim League		24 May 1982	28 September 1983	1 year, 127 days	K. Karunakaran	Indian National Congress
3	K. Avukader Kutty Naha	Indian Union Muslim League		24 October 1983	25 March 1987	3 years, 152 days	K. Karunakaran	Indian National Congress

== Statistics ==
List of deputy chief ministers by length of term

No.	Name	Party	Length of term	
No.	Name	Party	Longest continuous term	Total years of deputy chief ministership
1	R. Sankar	INC	2 years, 216 days	2 years, 216 days
2	K. Avukader Kutty Naha	IUML	3 years, 152 days	3 years, 152 days
3	C. H. Mohammed Koya	IUML	1 year, 127 days	1 year, 206 days

== Oath as the state deputy chief minister ==
The deputy chief minister serves five years in the office. The following is the oath of the Deputy chief minister of state:

I, <Name of Deputy Chief Minister>, do swear in the name of God/solemnly affirm that I will bear true faith and allegiance to the Constitution of India as by law established, that I will uphold the sovereignty and integrity of India, that I will faithfully and conscientiously discharge my duties as a Minister for the State of () and that I will do right to all manner of people in accordance with the Constitution and the law without fear or favour, affection or ill-will.

Oath of Secrecy

"I, [Name], do swear in the name of God / solemnly affirm that I will not directly or indirectly communicate or reveal to any person or persons any matter which shall be brought under my consideration or shall become known to me as a Minister for the State of [Name of State] except as may be required for the due discharge of my duties as such Minister. "[Name] enna njan, niyamam vazhi sthapithamaya bharathathinte bharanaghadanayoutu yatharthamaya vishwasa-vum koorum pularthumennum, njan bharathathinte paramadhikaravum akhandathayum nilanirthumennum, [State Name] samsthanathe mukhyamanthri enna nilayilulla ente karthavyangal vishwasthathayoutum manassakshiye munnirthiyum nirvahikkumennum, bhayamo preethiyo vidweshamo koodathe raga-dweshangalkkatheethamayi bharanaghadanayum niyamavum anusarichu ellatharam janangalkkum neethi cheyumennum sathyasandhamayum dridhamayum prathijna cheyyunnu.""[Name] enna njan, [State Name] samsthanathe oru manthri (mukhyamanthri) enna nilayil ente alochanaikku konduvarunnatho enikku arivu labhikkunnatho aya eathangilum vishayam, anganeyulla manthri enna nilayilulla ente karthavyangalinute shariyaya nirvahanathinu aavashyamayirukkunnathozhike, prathyakshamayayilum parokshamayayilum yathoru vyakthikko vyakthikalkko velippeduthukayo ariyikkukayo illennu sathyasandhamayum dridhamayum prathijna cheyyunnu."
