= T. P. Ashrafali =

Indian politician

Member of the Kerala Legislative Assembly
- Incumbent
- Assumed office May 2026
- Preceding: T. V. Ibrahim
- Constituency: Kondotty

Personal details
- Born: T. P. Ashrafali; 1983 (age 42–43) Edakkara, Malappuram, Kerala, India
- Party: Indian Union Muslim League
- Education: University of Calicut (MA)
- Occupation: Politician, Businessman

T. P. Ashrafali (born 1983) is an Indian politician from Kerala and a leader of the Indian Union Muslim League (IUML). He represents the Kondotty constituency in the Kerala Legislative Assembly. Since 2025, he has also served as the National General Secretary of the Muslim Youth League.

== Early life and education ==
Ashrafali was born in Edakkara, Malappuram district. He completed his Post Graduation in Islamic Studies from Saafi Institute of Advanced Studies, Vazhayur (affiliated with Calicut University) in 2013.

== Political career ==
Ashrafali rose through the ranks of the Muslim Youth League (MYL), the youth wing of the IUML. In 2025, he was appointed as the National General Secretary of the MYL.

In the 2026 Kerala Legislative Assembly election, he was selected as the United Democratic Front (UDF) candidate for the Kondotty constituency, replacing sitting MLA T. V. Ibrahim. He won the election with a significant margin of 56,017 votes, defeating Dr. P. Jiji of the CPI(M).

== Election results ==
=== 2026 ===
2026 Kerala Legislative Assembly election: Kondotty
Party	Candidate	Votes	%	±%
IUML	T. P. Ashrafali	1,14,997	58.48	
CPI(M)	Dr. P. Jiji	58,980	30.00	
BJP	P. Subrahmannian	14,212	7.23	
Majority		56,017	28.48	
Turnout		1,96,633	81.30	
		Swing		
