= Chandy ministry =

Chandy ministry may refer to:

- First Chandy ministry, the Kerala government headed by Oommen Chandy from 2004 to 2006
- Second Chandy ministry, the Kerala government headed by Oommen Chandy from 2011 to 2016

== See also ==
- Oommen Chandy
