= M. P. M. Ahammed Kurikkal =

Indian politician and social worker

- M. P. M. Ahammed Kurikkal

Minister for Panchayath and Community Development
- In office 6 March 1967 – 24 October 1968
- Chief Minister: E.M.S. Namboodiripad
- Preceded by: P. P. Ummer Koya
- Succeeded by: K. Avukader Kutty Naha

Personal details
- Born: 23 August 1921
- Died: 24 October 1968 (aged 47)
- Party: Indian Union Muslim League

M. P. M. Ahammed "Bapu" Kurikkal (1921 - 1968) was an Indian politician and social worker who served as the Minister for Local Self Governments in Kerala Government from 1967 to 1968. He conceived the creation of the Malappuram District in central Kerala in the late 1960s.

He was the Indian Union Muslim League representative to the Kerala Legislative Assembly from Kondotty (1957 and 1960) and Malappuram (1967). He and C. H. Mohammed Koya were the first two Indian Union Muslim League ministers in Kerala Government (1967- 69 Namboodiripad Ministry).

Kurikkal died in October 1968 while serving as the Minister of Panchayat and Community Development in the 1967- 69 Namboodiripad Ministry (United Front Government). He was succeeded by K. Avukaderkutty Naha (who oversaw the creation of the Malappuram District in 1969).
