= K. Avukader Kutty Naha =

Indian politician and social worker

- K. Avukader Kutty Naha

3rd Deputy Chief Minister of Kerala
- In office 24 October 1983 – 25 March 1987
- Chief Minister: K. Karunakaran
- Portfolios: Public Works
- Preceded by: C. H. Mohammed Koya
- Succeeded by: Office Vacant

Minister for Local Administration
- In office 09 November 1968 – 21 October 1969
- Preceded by: M. P. M. Ahammed Kurikkal
- Succeeded by: Himself
- In office 01 November 1969 - 01 August 1970
- Preceded by: Himself
- Succeeded by: Himself
- In office 04 October 1970 - 25 March 1977
- Preceded by: Himself
- Succeeded by: Himself
- In office 11 April 1977 - 25 April 1977
- Preceded by: Himself
- Succeeded by: Himself
- In office 27 April 1977 - 27 October 1978
- Preceded by: Himself
- Succeeded by: Himself
- In office 09 December 1978 - 07 October 1979
- Preceded by: Himself
- Succeeded by: C. H. Mohammed Koya, R.S. Unni

Minister of Public Works, Government of Kerala
- In office 24 October 1983 - 25 March 1987
- Preceded by: C. H. Mohammed Koya
- Succeeded by: V. J. Thankappan

Minister of Food and Sivil Supplies, Government of Kerala
- In office 04 October 1970 - 25 March 1977
- Preceded by: K. R. Gowri Amma C. Achutha Menon
- Succeeded by: K. G. Adiyodi

Minister of Fisheries, Government of Kerala

Personal details
- Born: 5 February 1920 Tirurangadi, Madras Province, British India
- Died: 11 August 1988 (aged 68) Tirurangadi, Kerala, India
- Party: Indian Union Muslim League
- Spouse: P. K. Kunhibeebi Umma
- Children: P. K. Abdu Rabb (Son)

Kunhikoyamutty Avukader Kutty Naha (1920–1988) was an Indian politician and social worker who served as the Minister of Local Administration in various Kerala Governments from 1968 to 1979. As an Indian Union Muslim League minister in the 1967–1969 Namboodiripad ministry, Naha oversaw the creation of the Malappuram District in central Kerala (1969). Naha, with minister M. N. Govindan Nair and official C. K. Kochukoshy, also devised the 'One Lakh Houses' scheme in Kerala (1970–1977 Achutha Menon ministry).

Naha was later appointed the Deputy Chief Minister of Kerala (1983–1987) under United Democratic Front Chief Minister K. Karunakaran. He was the Indian Union Muslim League representative to the Kerala Legislative Assembly from Tirurangadi Assembly Constituency (1957–1987).

Naha was born in February 1920 to Kunhikoyamutty Haji. He was married to P. K. Kunhibeebi Umma. He is the father of the former Kerala state Education Minister P. K. Abdu Rabb (2011–2016).

== Career ==
- Member, Malabar District Board (1954)
- Chairman, House Committee (1960–1962)
- Deputy Leader, Muslim League Legislature Party (1980–1982).
- Committee on Public Undertakings (1982–1983).
- Vice President, Indian Union Muslim League Kerala State Committee
- President, Kerala State Swathanthra Thozhilali Union.

=== Member of Legislative Assembly ===
Constituency	Election	Assembly	Tenure	Position	Chief Minister
Tirurangadi	1957	1st KLA	1957–59	Opposition	E. M. S. Namboodiripad
Tirurangadi	1960	2nd KLA	1960–64	Government	Pattom Thanu Pillai
Tirurangadi	1960	2nd KLA	1960–64	Abstaining Opposition	Pattom Thanu Pillai
Tirurangadi	1960	2nd KLA	1960–64	Abstaining Opposition	R. Sankar
Tirurangadi	1965	No Ministry formed			
Tirurangadi	1967	3rd KLA	1967–70	Government	E. M. S. Namboodiripad
Tirurangadi	1967	3rd KLA	1967–70	Government	C. Achutha Menon
Tirurangadi	1970	4th KLA	1970–77	Government	C. Achutha Menon
Tirurangadi	1977	5th KLA	1977–79	Government	K. Karunakaran
Tirurangadi	1977	5th KLA	1977–79	Government	A. K. Antony
Tirurangadi	1977	5th KLA	1977–79	Government	P. K. Vasudevan Nair
Tirurangadi	1977	5th KLA	1977–79	Government	C. H. Mohammed Koya
Tirurangadi	1980	6th KLA	1980–82	Opposition	E. K. Nayanar
Tirurangadi	1980	6th KLA	1980–82	Government	K. Karunakaran
Tirurangadi	1982	7th KLA	1982–87	Government	K. Karunakaran

== Minister in different Kerala ministries ==
Election	Term	Chief Minister	Portfolio	Period
1967	1967–69	E. M. S. Namboodiripad	Panchayat and Community Development	1968–69
1967	1969–70	C. Achutha Menon	Local Administration	1969–70
1970	1970–77	C. Achutha Menon	Food and Local Administration	1970–77
1977	1977	K. Karunakaran	Local Administration	1977
1977	1977–78	A. K. Antony	Local Administration	1977–78
1977	1978–79	P. K. Vasudevan Nair	Local Administration	1978–79
1982	1982–87	K. Karunakaran	Deputy Chief Minister	1983–87
