= Abdurahiman Randathani =

Indian politician and orator

Abdurahiman Randathani is an Indian politician, orator and former Member of Legislative Assembly (MLA) of Tanur constituency in Kerala State. Currently he is State secretary of Indian Union Muslim League Kerala and Chairman of Shihab Thangal multispeciality hospital, Tirur.

== Biography ==
Abdurahiman Randathani was born on 15 March 1961 at Cherussola near Randathani in Malappuram district, as the son of vakkayil Mohammed Haji and Palamadathil Biriyumma Hajjumma.

He entered politics through the Muslim Youth League (MYL). He was the secretary of Abu Dhabi KMCC (Kerala Muslim Cultural Center). He served as Vice president and chairman of Malappuram District Panchayat Standing committee and Director of Moinkutty Vaidyar Smaraka Committee.

He had a key role in making projects such as Akshaya (Computer literate program), Vijayabheri education program, Smart class room and renovation of District hospital organized by Malappuram district panchayath. He was recipient of laurel of the state Government for the best conduct of the Akshaya Project.

At present, he is the member of state Indian Union Muslim League working committee, secretary of Muslim League working committee Malappuram district and President of Farook College PTA.

He is married to Thaikkadan Rahmath Habeeba and they have 3 sons.

== Controversies ==
Randathani criticised the school curriculum revision by the Kerala Government saying that it aims to impart lessons on 'masturbation' and 'homosexuality' to adolescents.
