= K. P. A. Majeed =

Indian politician and social worker

Member of the Kerala Legislative Assembly for Tirurangadi
- In office 2021–2026
- Preceded by: P. K. Abdu Rabb
- In office 1980–1982
- Constituency: Mankada
- In office 1982–1987
- Constituency: Mankada
- In office 1987–1991

Chief Whip, Kerala Government
- In office 1991–1996
- Constituency: Mankada
- In office 1996–2001
- Constituency: Mankada

Personal details
- Born: 15 July 1950 (age 75)
- Party: Indian Union Muslim League
- Spouse: T. P. Kunhima

K. P. A. Majeed (born 15 July 1950) is an Indian politician and social worker who served as the Member of the Legislative Assembly from Tirurangadi Constituency in Kerala. He formerly functioned as the General Secretary, Kerala State Committee, Indian Union Muslim League.

Majeed served as the Member of the Legislative Assembly from Mankada Constituency between 1980 and 2021. He also served as Kerala Government Chief Whip between 1992 and 1996. He unsuccessfully ran for the Parliament (Loksabha) in the 2004 General Elections from Manjeri Constituency. He is best known as the leader of the Arabic language movement against the Nayanar government in 1980. From 2021 he has served as Kerala legislative Assembly Assurance committee chairman.

Other positions include:-

- Muslim League National Committee Vice President from 2025
- Muslim League Legislative Assembly Parliamentary Party Secretary from 2021
- Muslim League State High Power Committee Member
- Muslim League State General Secretary from 2011 to 2021
- Muslim League State Secretary from 2008 to 2011
- Muslim League Malappuram District General Secretary from 1991 to 2008
- Muslim Youth League State General Secretary from 1974 to 1986
- Muslim Youth League State Advisory Committee Convener
- Muslim Youth League Malappuram District General Secretary
- Muslim Youth League Perinthalmanna Taluk General Secretary
- Malappuram District MSF Treasurer
- Perinthalmanna Taluk MSF President
- Kuruva Panchayat MSF President
- Member of the Senate of Calicut University
- Former member of Kuruva Panchayath
- President of Malappuram District Cooperative Hospital
- Former President of Malappuram District Cooperative Bank
- Former Chairman of Kerala SIDCO

Kerala Legislative Assembly
Election	Assembly	Constituency	Duration	Position	Chief Minister
1980	6	Mankada	1980 – 1982	Opposition (1980 – 81)	E. K. Nayanar
1980	6	Mankada	1980 – 1982	Government (1981 – 82)	K. Karunakaran
1982	7	Mankada	1982 – 1987	Government	K. Karunakaran
1987	8	Mankada	1987 – 1991	Opposition	E. K. Nayanar
1991	9	Mankada	1991 – 1996	Government	K. Karunakaran and A. K. Antony
1996	10	Mankada	1996 – 2001	Opposition	E. K. Nayanar
2021	15	Tirurangadi	2021 – present	Opposition	Pinarayi Vijayan
