= T. V. Ibrahim =

Indian politician

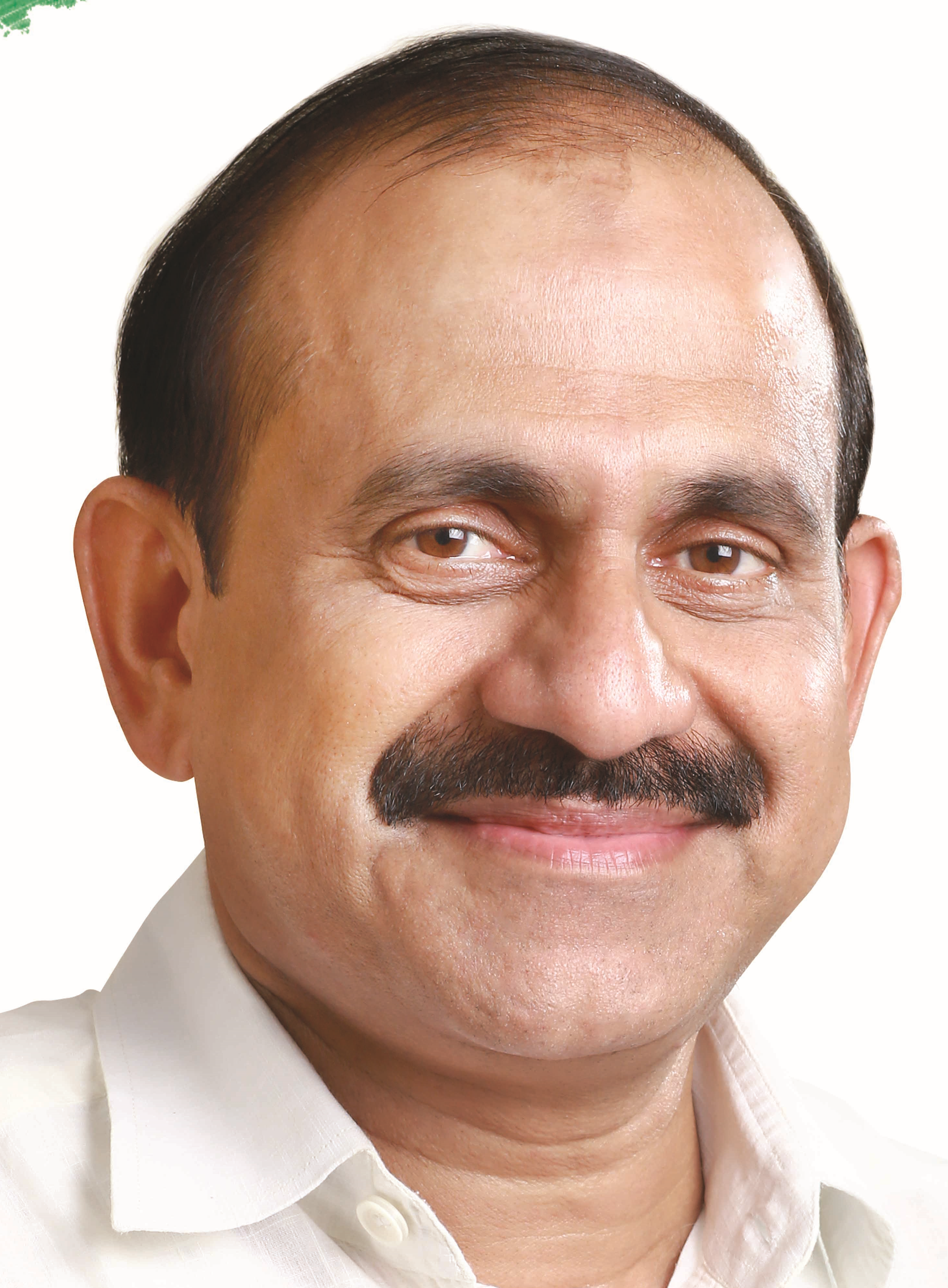

Member of the Kerala Legislative Assembly
- In office 2016–2026
- Preceded by: K. Muhammedunni Haji
- Succeeded by: T. P. Ashrafali
- Constituency: Kondotty

Personal details
- Born: 1 May 1965 (age 61) Pookkottur
- Party: Indian Union Muslim League
- Spouse: Sareena P
- Children: Mohammed Jaseem, Anshid Nuaman, Adila Ibrahim
- Education: M.A., M.Phil., B.Ed. (political science)

T.V. Ibrahim is an Indian politician belonging to Indian Union Muslim League. He was the MLA of Kondotty, Malappuram from May 2021 to May 2026.

== Early life ==
T.V. Ibrahim was born on 1 May 1965, in Pookkottur, to Shri T.V. Mohammedhaji and Smt. Ithikkutty K. He is married to Smt. Sareena and has one daughter and two sons. He received his master's degree in political science from Madurai Kamaraj University in 2001, and M.Phil from Annamalai University in 2008. He also acquired B.Ed and entered into the field of teaching.

== Political career ==
T.V Ibrahim started his political career as the State President and General Secretary of Muslim Students Federation. He then went on to become the State Secretary of Youth League, President of Malappuram Block Panchayat (1995-2000) and member of Malappuram District Panchayat (2000–05). Later on he became the Secretary of IUML in Malappuram District.

Currently, he is involved as the Secretary of Athanikkal M.I.C Orphanage, President of Athanikkal Public Library and Vice President of P.K.M.I.C. Orphanage, Pookkottur.

He is an Executive Committee Member of State and National Committee of Indian Union Muslim League and has been newly elected to Kerala Legislative Assembly.

== Election Performance ==
=== Kerala Legislative Assembly Election 2021 ===
There were 2,05,261 registered voters in the constituency for the 2021 Kerala Niyamasabha Election.

2021 Kerala Legislative Assembly election: Kondotty
Party	Candidate	Votes	%	±%
IUML	T. V. Ibrahim	82,759	50.42%	▲3.84
LDF	Kattiparuthy Sulaiman Haji	65,093	39.66%	▲0.20
BJP	Sheeba Unnikrishnan	11,114	6.77%	▼1.60
WPOI	Razak Paleri	2,579	1.57%	Steady
BSP	T. Sivadasan	908	0.55%	▲0.55
Independent	Sulaiman Haji	905	0.55%	N/A
NOTA	None of the above	554	0.34%	▼0.05
Independent	C. V. Ibrahim	233	0.14%	N/A
Margin of victory		17,666	10.76%	▲3.64
Turnout		1,64,145	79.97%	▲0.57
IUML hold		Swing	▲3.84	

=== Kerala Legislative Assembly Election 2016 ===
There were 1,88,358 registered voters in Kondotty Constituency for the 2016 Kerala Niyamasabha Election.

2016 Kerala Legislative Assembly election : Kondotty
Party	Candidate	Votes	%	±%
IUML	T. V. Ibrahim	69,668	46.58%	▼10.24
LDF	K. P. Beeran Kutty	59,014	39.46%	−
BJP	K. Ramachandran	12,513	8.37%	▲2.65
SDPI	Nazarudheen Elamaram	3,667	2.45%	▲0.76
WPOI	Saleem Vazhakkad	2,344	1.57%	−
NOTA	None of the above	581	0.39%	−
PDP	Abdul Gaffoor Vavoor	566	0.38%	−
Independent	K. P. Veeran Kutty	442	0.30%	−
Independent	Sulfikar Ali Ambal	316	0.21%	−
Independent	Kadeeja	267	0.18%	−
Independent	Ibrahim Cholakkad	176	0.12%	−
Margin of victory		10,654	7.12%	▼16.40
Turnout		1,49,554	79.40%	▲3.68
IUML hold		Swing	▼10.24	
