= Tanur Assembly constituency =

Constituency of the Kerala legislative assembly in India

Tanur
- Constituency No. 44 for the Kerala Legislative Assembly
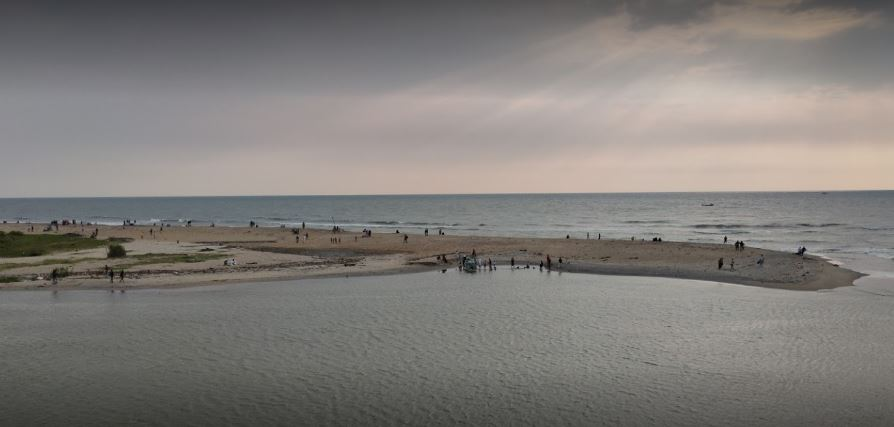
- Ottumpuram Beach, Tanur

Constituency details
- Country: India
- Region: South India
- State: Kerala
- District: Malappuram
- Established: 1957
- Total electors: 1,72,324 (2026)
- Reservation: None

Member of Legislative Assembly
- 16th Kerala Legislative Assembly
- Incumbent P. K. Navas
- Party: IUML
- Alliance: UDF
- Elected year: 2026

Tanur State assembly constituency is one of the 140 state legislative assembly constituencies in Kerala in southern India. It is also one of the seven state legislative constituency. As of the 2026 Assembly elections, the current MLA is P K Navas.

== Local self-governed segments ==
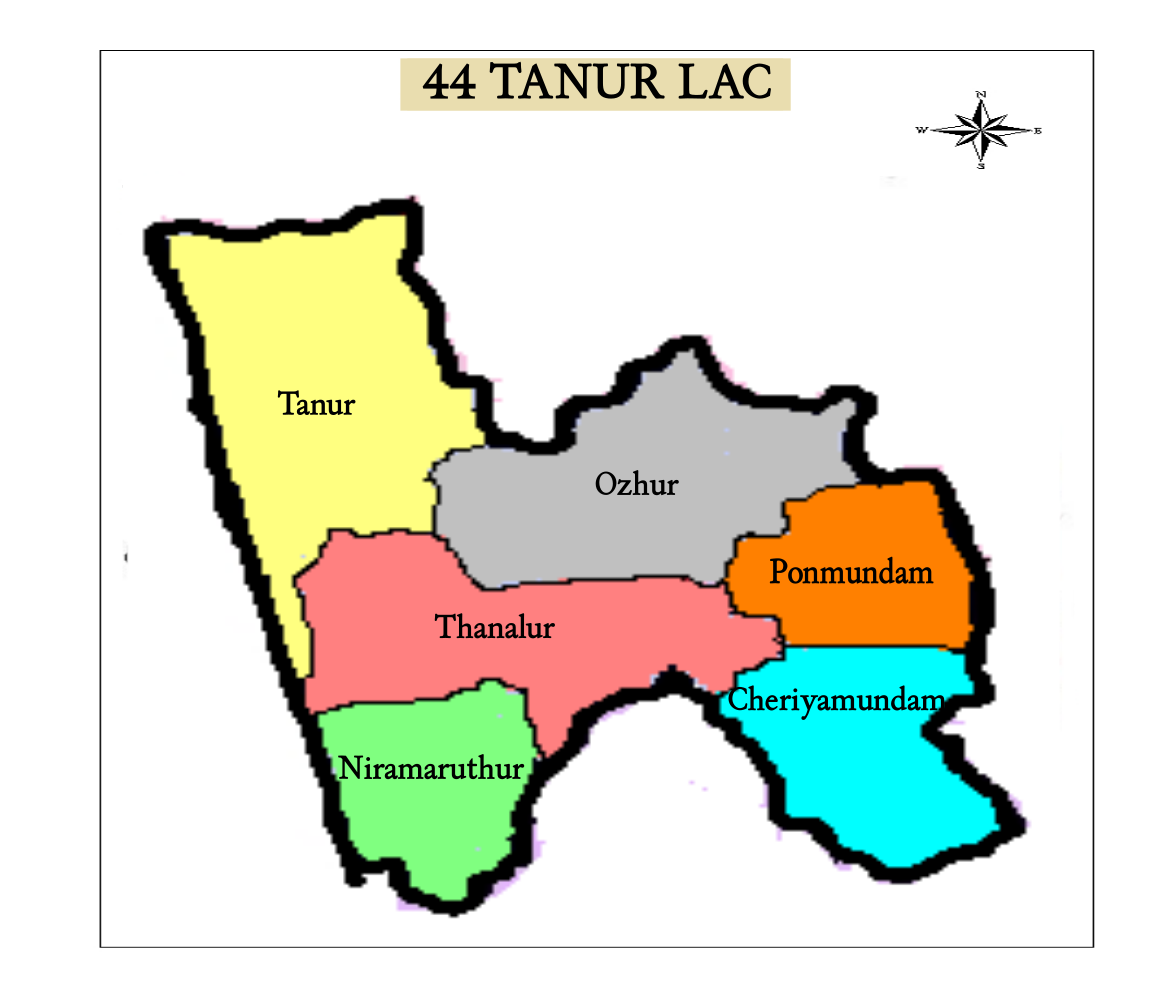
Map of Tanur Assembly constituency

Tanur Assembly constituency is composed of the following local self-governed segments:

Sl no.	Name	Status (Grama panchayat/Municipality)	Taluk
1	Tanur	Municipality	Tirur
2	Ozhur	Grama panchayat	Tirur
3	Ponmundam	Grama panchayat	Tirur
4	Thanalur	Grama panchayat	Tirur
5	Niramaruthur	Grama panchayat	Tirur
6	Cheriyamundam	Grama panchayat	Tirur

Tanur Assembly constituency

== Members of Legislative Assembly ==
The following list contains all members of Kerala Legislative Assembly who have represented Tanur Assembly constituency during the period of various assemblies:

Year	Member	Political party
1957	C. H. Mohammed Koya	Indian Union Muslim League
1960	C. H. Mohammed Koya	Indian Union Muslim League
1967	M. M. K. Haji	Indian Union Muslim League
1970	Ummer Bafaki Tangal	Indian Union Muslim League
1977	U. A. Beeran	Indian Union Muslim League
1980	E. Ahamed	Indian Union Muslim League
1982	E. Ahamed	Indian Union Muslim League
1987	E. Ahamed	Indian Union Muslim League
1991	P. Seethi Haji	Indian Union Muslim League
1992 (Note: By-Election)	Kutty Ahammed Kutty	Indian Union Muslim League
1996	P. K. Abdu Rabb	Indian Union Muslim League
2001	P. K. Abdu Rabb	Indian Union Muslim League
2006	Abdurahiman Randathani	Indian Union Muslim League
2011	Abdurahiman Randathani	Indian Union Muslim League
2016	V. Abdurahiman	National Secular Conference
2021	V. Abdurahiman	National Secular Conference
2026	P. K. Navas	Indian Union Muslim League

== Election results ==
Percentage change (±%) denotes the change in the number of votes from the immediate previous election.

=== 2026 ===
2026 Kerala Legislative Assembly election: Tanur
Party	Candidate	Votes	%	±%
IUML	P. K. Navas	91,992		
NSC	Muhammed Sameer T.	64,861		
BJP	Deepa Puzhakkal	13,642		
NOTA	None of the above	589		
Independent	P. P. Navas	502		
Independent	Sameer T.	373		
Independent	Muhammed Sameer Narungel Parambil	365		
Margin of victory		27,131		
Turnout		1,72,324		
IUML gain from NSC		Swing		

=== 2021 ===
2021 Kerala Legislative Assembly election: Tanur
Party	Candidate	Votes	%	±%
NSC	V. Abdurahiman	70,704	46.34%	▲1.3
IUML	P. K. Firos	69,719	45.71%	▲2.00
BJP	K. Narayanan Master	10,590	6.94%	▼0.41
NOTA	None of the above	336	0.22%	▲0.96
BSP	Mueenudheen	183	0.12%	N/A
Margin of victory		985	4.93%	▲14.14
Turnout		152,570	78.36%	▲2.38
NSC hold		Swing	▲2.00	

=== 2016 ===
There were 1,76,07 registered voters in Tanur Assembly constituency for the 2016 Kerala Assembly election.

2016 Kerala Legislative Assembly election: Tanur
Party	Candidate	Votes	%	±%
NSC	V. Abdurahiman	64,472	45.78%	
IUML	Abdurahiman Randathani	59,554	42.29%	▼7.23
BJP	P. R. Rasmilnath	11,051	7.85%	▲0.83
WPOI	Asharaf Vailathur	1,291	0.92%	−
SDPI	K. K. Majeed Khasimi	1,151	0.82%	▼2.19
PDP	Anvar Pannikkandathil	858	0.61%	−
Independent	P. T. Unni	708	0.50%	−
Independent	V. Abdurahiman Vayangatil	672	0.48%	−
NOTA	None of the above	569	0.40%	−
Margin of victory		4,918	3.49%	
Turnout		1,40,838	79.99%	▲1.88
NSC gain from IUML		Swing		

=== 2011 ===
There were 1,33,276 registered voters in the constituency for the 2011 election.

2011 Kerala Legislative Assembly election: Tanur
Party	Candidate	Votes	%	±%
IUML	Abdurahiman Randathani	51,549	49.52%	
CPI(M)	E. Jayan	42,116	40.45%	
BJP	Ravi Thelath	7,304	7.02%	
SDPI	K. K. Majeed Khasimi	3,137	3.01%	
Margin of victory		9,433	9.07%	
Turnout		1,04,106	78.11%	
IUML hold		Swing		

== See also ==
- Tanur
- Malappuram district
- List of constituencies of the Kerala Legislative Assembly
- 2016 Kerala Legislative Assembly election
