= UDSF =

Indian student organization

United Democratic Students' Front (UDSF)
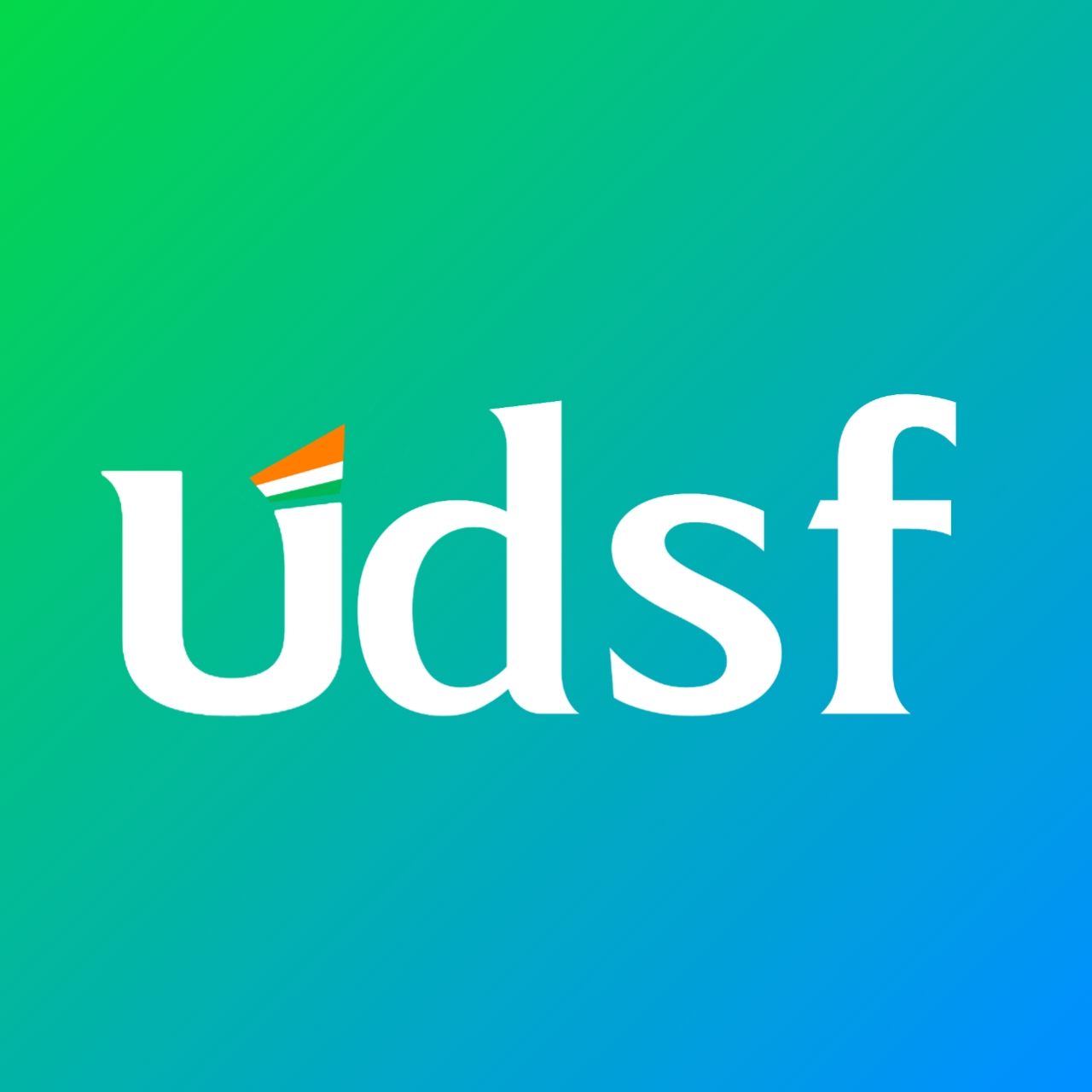
- Formation: 1990; 36 years ago
- Founded at: Kerala
- Type: Students Political alliance
- Headquarters: Indira Bhavan, Vellayambalam, Thiruvananthapuram District, Kerala, India
- Chairman: Aloshious Xavier
- Convenors: PK Navas
- Treasurer: Johns George Kunnappillil
- Affiliations: UDF

The United Democratic Students' Front (UDSF) is an Indian student organization. It is an alliance of the Kerala Students Union (KSU), the Muslim Students Federation (MSF), the Progressive Students Union (PSU), and Kerala Students Congress (KSC).

== Campus units ==
- University of Calicut

== Students’ Union in University of Calicut ==
Current office bearers
Name	Designation	Organization	College
P.K. Shifana	Chairperson	MSF	KKTM Government College
Sufiyan Villan	General Secretary	MSF	Farook College
A.C. Muhammed Irfan	Vice-chairman	MSF	Farook College
Anusha Roby	Join secretary	KSU	Government Law College, Thrissur

2024 office bearers
Name	Designation	Organization	College
Nithin Fathima	Chairperson	KSU	Government Victoria College, Palakkad
Muhammed Safvan P	General Secretary	MSF	Majlis Arts and Science College Puramannur
Arshad P	Vice-chairman	MSF	Farook College
Sabna K.T	Vice-chairperson	MSF	Swami Vivekananda Center of Teacher Education, Mayilumpuram
Aswin Nadh	Join-Secretary	KSU	NMSM Govt College Kalpetta

== See also ==
- MSF Kerala
- KSU
- PSU
