= Roland E. Miller =

Canadian historian

Roland E. Miller is a Canadian historian and academic known for his studies on Muslims of Kerala, southern India. He is a professor emeritus of Islam and World Religions at Luther College, University of Regina (Saskatchewan), and professor emeritus at Luther Seminary, Minnesota.

Miller was described by historian Robin Jeffrey as "leading foreign scholar of modern Mappila [Kerala Muslim] life". He lived among the Mappila community for around 25 years and has studied Arabic and Malayalam. His 1976 study on Mappila life was described by historian Stephen F. Dale as the first significant study of the Mappila community since William Logan completed his Malabar Manual in 1882.

== Bibliography ==
- Mappila Muslims of Kerala: A Study in Islamic Trends (1976)
- Mappila Muslim Culture (2015)
- Muslims and the Gospel: Bridging the Gap: A Reflection on Christian Sharing
