= Tirurangadi Assembly constituency =

Constituency of the Kerala legislative assembly in India

Tirurangadi
- Constituency No. 43 for the Kerala Legislative Assembly
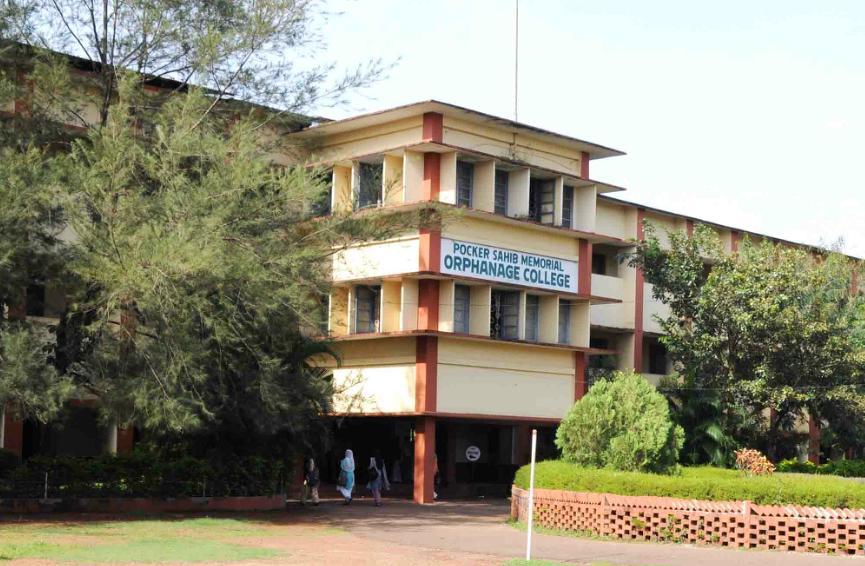
- PSMO College Tirurangadi

Constituency details
- Country: India
- Region: South India
- State: Kerala
- District: Malappuram
- Established: 1957
- Total electors: 1,97,080 (2021)
- Reservation: None

Member of Legislative Assembly
- 16th Kerala Legislative Assembly
- Incumbent P. M. A. Sameer
- Party: IUML
- Alliance: UDF
- Elected year: 2026

Tirurangadi State assembly constituency is one of the 140 state legislative assembly constituencies in Kerala in southern India. It is also one of the seven state legislative assembly constituencies included in Ponnani Lok Sabha constituency. As of the 2026 Assembly elections, the current MLA is P. M. A. Sameer of IUML.

== Local self-governed segments ==
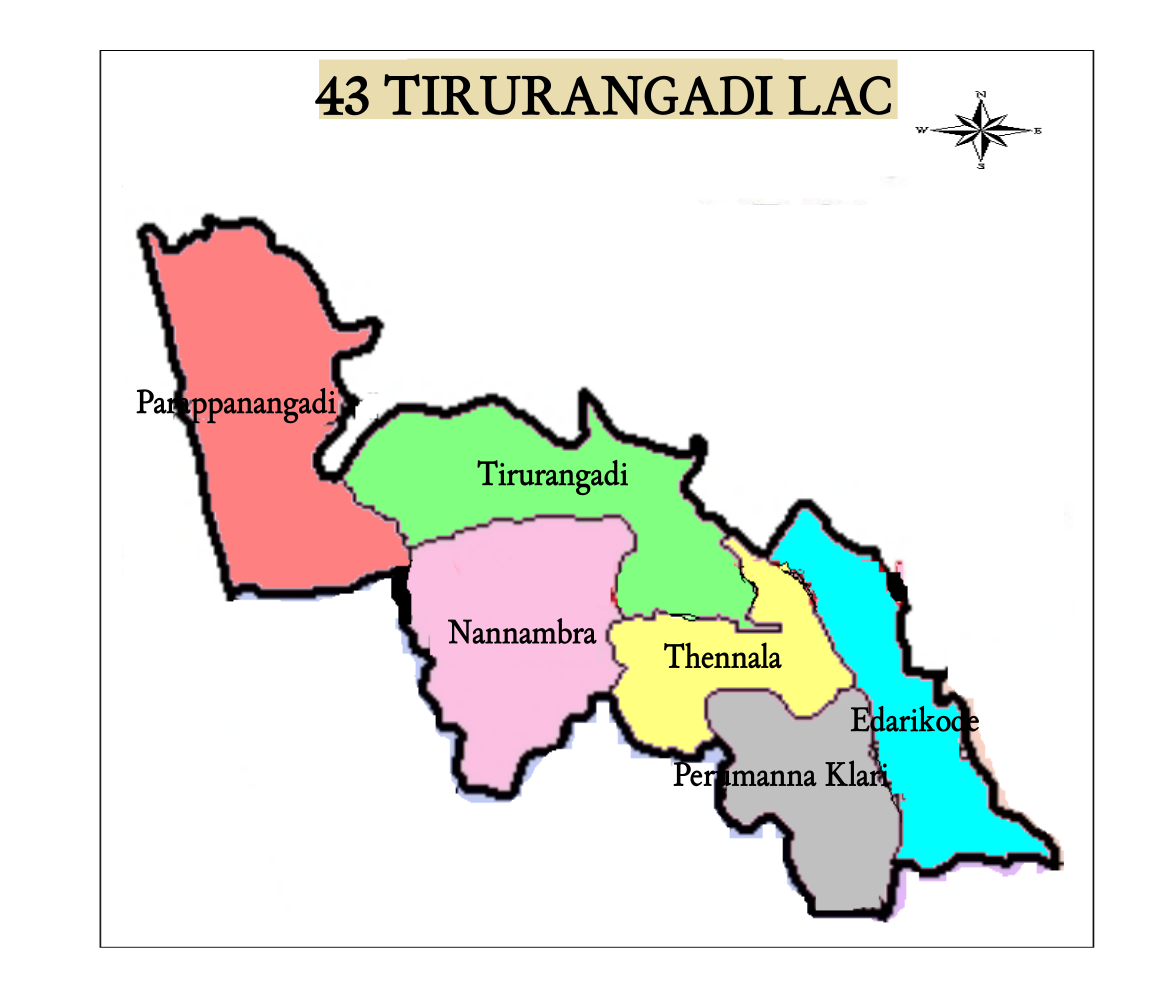
Map of Tirurangadi Assembly constituency

Tirurangadi Assembly constituency is composed of the following local self-governed segments:

Sl no.	Name	Status (grama panchayat/municipality)	Taluk
1	Parappanangadi	Municipality	Tirurangadi
2	Tirurangadi	Municipality	Tirurangadi
3	Nannambra	Grama panchayat	Tirurangadi
4	Thennala	Grama panchayat	Tirurangadi
5	Edarikode	Grama panchayat	Tirurangadi
6	Perumanna-Klari	Grama panchayat	Tirur

Tirurangadi Assembly constituency

== Members of Legislative Assembly ==
The following list contains all members of Kerala Legislative Assembly who have represented Tirurangadi Assembly constituency during the period of various assemblies:

Election	Niyama Sabha	Name	Party	Tenure
1957	1st	K. Avukader Kutty Naha	Indian Union Muslim League	1957 – 1960
1960	2nd	K. Avukader Kutty Naha	Indian Union Muslim League	1960 – 1965
1967	3rd		Indian Union Muslim League	1967 – 1970
1970	4th	K. Avukader Kutty Naha	Indian Union Muslim League	1970 – 1977
1977	5th	K. Avukader Kutty Naha	Indian Union Muslim League	1977 – 1980
1980	6th	K. Avukader Kutty Naha	Indian Union Muslim League	1980 – 1982
1982	7th	K. Avukader Kutty Naha	Indian Union Muslim League	1982 – 1987
1987	8th	C. P. Kunhalikutty Keyi	Indian Union Muslim League	1987 – 1991
1991	9th	V. A. Beeran Sahib	Indian Union Muslim League	1991 – 1995
1995*	9th	A. K. Antony	Indian National Congress	1995 - 1996
1996	10th	Kutty Ahammed Kutty	Indian Union Muslim League	1996 – 2001
2001	11th	Kutty Ahammed Kutty	Indian Union Muslim League	2001 – 2006
2006	12th	Kutty Ahammed Kutty	Indian Union Muslim League	2006 – 2011
2011	13th	P. K. Abdu Rabb	Indian Union Muslim League	2011 – 2016
2016	14th	P. K. Abdu Rabb	Indian Union Muslim League	2016 - 2021
2021	15th	K. P. A. Majeed	Indian Union Muslim League	2021 - 2026
2026	16th	P. M. A. Sameer	Indian Union Muslim League	2026 -

*by-election

== Election results ==
Percentage change (±%) denotes the change in the number of votes from the immediate previous election.

=== 2026 ===
2026 Kerala Legislative Assembly election: Tirurangadi
Party	Candidate	Votes	%	±%
IUML	P. M. A. Sameer	111,869	63.48	▲13.74
CPI	Ajith Kolady	48,482	27.51	▼15.85
BJP	Riju C. Raghav	11,497	6.52	▲0.89
SDPI	Hameed V.	2,650	1.50	
NOTA	None of the above	873	0.49	▲0.01
AAP	Moosa Jarathingal	843	0.47	
Margin of victory		63,387		
Turnout		1,76,214		
IUML hold		Swing		

=== 2021 ===
2021 Kerala Legislative Assembly election: Tirurangadi
Party	Candidate	Votes	%	±%
IUML	K. P. A. Majeed	73,499	49.74	
CPI	Niyas Pulickalakath	63,921	43.26	
BJP	Kalliyath Sathar Haji	8,314	5.63	
NOTA	None of the above	721	0.48	
Independent	Niyas	487	0.33	
BSP	Abdul Majeed Panackal	303	0.21	
Swaraj India	Moosa Jarathingal	274	0.19	
Independent	Chandran	132	0.09	
Independent	Abdulrahim Naha	120	0.08	
Margin of victory		9,578		
Turnout		1,47,771	74.98	
IUML hold		Swing		

=== 2016 ===
There were 1,82,849 registered voters in Tirurangadi Assembly constituency for the 2016 Kerala Assembly election.

2016 Kerala Legislative Assembly election: Tirurangadi
Party	Candidate	Votes	%	±%
IUML	P. K. Abdu Rabb	63,027	46.53%	▼11.95
LDF	Niyas Pulikkalakath	56,884	42.06%	−
BJP	P. V. Geetha Madhavan	8,046	5.95%	▲0.49
SDPI	Adv. K. C. Naseer	2,478	1.83%	▼1.11
PDP	Maliyatt Abdurazak Haji	1,902	1.41%	▼2.86
WPOI	Minu Mumthaz	1,270	0.94%	−
NOTA	None of the above	630	0.47%	−
Independent	Niyas Paroli	541	0.40%	−
Independent	Haneefa	294	0.22%	−
Margin of victory		6,043	4.47%	▼25.64
Turnout		1,35,246	73.97%	▲8.35
IUML hold		Swing	▼11.95	

=== 2011 ===
There were 1,80,715 registered voters in the constituency for the 2011 election.

2016 Kerala Legislative Assembly election: Tirurangadi
Party	Candidate	Votes	%	±%
IUML	P. K. Abdu Rabb	58,666	58.48%	
CPI	K. K. Abdu Samad	28,458	28.37%	
BJP	Sasidharan Punnassery	5,480	5.46%	
PDP	Ibrahim Thirungadi	4,281	4.27%	
SDPI	A. A. Rahim	2,945	2.94%	
BSP	Abuyazar	492	0.49	
Margin of victory		30,208	30.11%	
Turnout		1,00,323	65.62%	
IUML hold		Swing		

== See also ==
- Tirurangadi
- Malappuram district
- List of constituencies of the Kerala Legislative Assembly
- 2016 Kerala Legislative Assembly election
