= C. H. Mohammed Koya =

Indian politician

C. H. Mohammad Koya

2nd Deputy Chief Minister of Kerala
- In office 24 May 1982 – 28 September 1983
- Chief Minister: K. Karunakaran
- Portfolios: Public Works
- Preceded by: Office Vacant
- Succeeded by: K. Avukader Kutty Naha
- In office 28 December 1981 – 17 March 1982
- Chief Minister: K. Karunakaran
- Preceded by: R. Sankar
- Succeeded by: Office Vacant

8th Chief Minister of Kerala
- In office 12 October 1979 – 1 December 1979
- Preceded by: P. K. Vasudevan Nair
- Succeeded by: E. K. Nayanar

Speaker of the Kerala Legislative Assembly
- In office 9 June 1961 – 11 November 1961
- Preceded by: K. M. Seethi Sahib
- Succeeded by: Alexander Parambithara

Member of Parliament, Lok Sabha
- In office 25 February 1962 – 21 February 1967
- Preceded by: K. P. Kutti Krishnan Nair
- Succeeded by: Ebrahim Sulaiman Sait
- Constituency: Kozhikode
- In office 5 February 1973 – 20 March 1977
- Preceded by: Muhammad Ismail
- Succeeded by: Ebrahim Sulaiman Sait
- Constituency: Manjeri

Member of Kerala Legislative Assembly
- In office 5 April 1957 – 6 March 1962
- Preceded by: Position established
- Succeeded by: C. Muhammed Kutty
- Constituency: Tanur
- In office 6 March 1967 – 17 September 1970
- Preceded by: P. Abdul Majeed
- Succeeded by: M. Moideen Kutty
- Constituency: Mankada
- In office 17 September 1970 – 5 February 1973
- Preceded by: Sayed Ummer Bafakhy
- Succeeded by: P. Seethi Haji
- Constituency: Kondotty
- In office 25 March 1977 – 3 January 1980
- Preceded by: U. A. Beeran
- Succeeded by: U. A. Beeran
- Constituency: Malappuram
- In office 26 March 1980 – 28 September 1983
- Preceded by: Abdulla Kurikkal
- Succeeded by: Ishaq Kurikkal
- Constituency: Manjeri

Minister for Home and Education, Government of Kerala
- In office 1969-1970, 1970-1973

Personal details
- Born: 15 July 1927 Atholi, Madras Presidency, British India
- Died: 28 September 1983 (aged 56) Hyderabad, Andhra Pradesh, India
- Party: Indian Union Muslim League
- Spouse: K K Amina (m. 1950)
- Children: Two daughters and a son (M. K. Muneer)
- As of 2 November, 2007 Source: Govt. of Kerala

Cheriyankandi Muhammad Koya (15 July 1927 – 28 September 1983) popularly known as C. H. Muhammad Koya was an Indian social reformer, educationist and statesman who served as the 10th Chief Minister of Kerala from October to December 1979. He is more often noted for being the Minister of Education of Kerala from 1967 to 1973 and again from 1977 to 1979. After his stint as chief minister, Koya went on to become the 2nd Deputy Chief Minister of Kerala from 1981 until his death in 1983. He is the first Indian Union Muslim League member to lead a state in independent India.

As the Minister of Education, Koya championed educational progress of backward classes in northern Kerala. He also served as the Home Minister (1969–73) and the Deputy Chief Minister of Kerala (1981–83).

== Life and career ==
Cheriyan Kandi Muhammad Koya was born in 1927 at Atholi in northern Kerala, to Payampunathil Ali and Mariyumma. Koya floated the Muslim Students Federation, the students wing of the All-India Muslim League, in Malabar District while he was at Zamorin's College, Kozhikode and later helped to organize an admirable reception for the prominent Muslim League leader and later Prime Minister of Pakistan Liaquat Ali Khan at Kozhikode (1945). He joined the Chandrika newspaper, the official organ of the Muslim League, in 1946.

Koya was first elected to the Kerala Assembly in the 1957 legislative elections. He went on to hold several key Kerala cabinet posts (Minister for Education, Deputy Chief Minister, Home Minister, and Minister for Finance). He served under both Indian National Congress and Communist Party of India Chief Ministers (E. M. S. Namboodiripad, C. Achutha Menon, K. Karunakaran, A. K. Antony, and P. K. Vasudevan Nair). He was elected to the Lok Sabha in the 1962 (1962–67) and in 1973 (1973–77, by-elections, replacing recently deceased M. Muhammed Ismail).

He was a Member in the Kerala University Senate and served as chairman, Governing Body, REC, Kozhikode.

Koya died suddenly due to a massive hemorrhagic stroke on 28 September 1983 while serving as the Deputy Chief Minister of Kerala. He was aged just 56 at the time of his death. His death came in Hyderabad, where he had gone for a meeting of state Industrial Ministers. His dead body was flown back to Thiruvananthapuram, and later transported to his native place, where he was buried with full state honours. He was survived by his mother, wife, three children and many siblings.

== Legacy ==
"Young men like C. H. Muhammad Koya realized that violent revolt promised nothing for them [the Kerala Muslims]. Electoral politics, on the other hand, might offer a great deal."

— Robin Jeffrey (historian)

Koya was known his eloquent oratory and was described by scholar R. E. Miller as "grassroots star of the Mappila community" and the "ranking hero of Muslim youth" in Kerala. He acted as a "bridge-builder" among various social and religious groups of Kerala. Koya is remembered for his "spirited" reply to Jawaharlal Nehru, the then Prime Minister of India when the latter publicly criticized Indian Union Muslim League as "a dead horse" at Kozhikode (1955).

As the Minister of Education, Koya championed the progress of the Mappila community in secular education. During Koya's tenure as the Minister of Education, the University of Calicut was established in northern Kerala. He also advocated higher standards in the 'Arabic Colleges'. (Note: Kerala 'Arabic Colleges' are the equivalent of north Indian madrasas)

== Member of Kerala Legislative Assembly ==
Source: Kerala Legislative Assembly (profile)

- 1st Assembly (1957–59) – Tanur
- 2nd Assembly (1960–64) – Tanur (resigned on 6 March 1962)
- 3rd Assembly (1967–70) – Mankada
- 4th Assembly (1970–77) – Kondotty (resigned on 5 February 1973)
- 5th Assembly (1977–79) – Malappuram
- 6th Assembly (1980–82) – Manjeri
- 7th Assembly (1982–87) – Manjeri (died on 28 September 1983)

== In Kerala council of ministers ==
Ministry	Office	Term			Source(s)
Pattom Ministry	Speaker (independent)	9 June 1961	10-October-1961	154 days	
2nd E. M. S. Ministry	Minister for Education	6 March 1967	21 October 1969	2 years, 229 days	
1st Achutha Menon Ministry	Minister for Home and Education	1 November 1969	1 August 1970	273 days	
2nd Achutha Menon Ministry	Minister for Home and Education	4 October 1970	1 March 1973	2 years, 148 days	
1st Karunakaran Ministry	Minister for Finance and Education	25 March 1977	25 April 1977	31 days	
1st Antony Ministry	Minister for Education	27 April 1977; 4 October 1978 (2nd)	20 December 1977; 27 October 1978 (2nd)	237 days; 23 days	
P. K. V. Ministry	Minister for Education	29 October 1978	7 October 1979	343 days	
CH Muhammad Koya Ministry	Chief Minister of Kerala & Home Affairs, tourism, Public administration, education, transport, local administration, food and civil supplies, fisheries.	12 October 1979	1 December 1979	51 days	
2nd Karunakaran Ministry	Deputy Chief Minister & Minister for Public Works	28 December 1981	17 March 1982	79 days	
3rd Karunakaran Ministry	Deputy Chief Minister & Minister for Public Works	24 May 1982	28 September 1983	1 year, 127 days	

== Works ==
Source: Kerala Legislative Assembly (profile)

- My Haj pilgrimage
- Caux-London-Cairo
- The Malaysia I Saw
- How Legislative Assembly Works
- Soviet Union
- Muslim Rule in India Through Stories
- Five Days in Sri Lanka
- Camel to Cadillac
- Travel Around the World

== Notes ==
Preceded by P.K. Vasudevan Nair	Chief Minister of Kerala; 1979– 1979	Succeeded by E.K. Nayanar

Preceded by Seethi Sahib	Speaker of Kerala Legislative Assembly; 1961– 1961	Succeeded by Alexander Parambithara
