= Kerala Muslim Cultural Centre =

Nonprofit organisation

Kerala Muslim Cultural Centre-KMCC
- Formation: 1985; 41 years ago
- Founder: E. Ahamed
- Type: non-profit organisation
- Headquarters: Abu Dhabi, UAE
- Location(s): Dubai, Abudhabi, Sharjah, Ajman, Qatar, Oman, Saudi Arabia, Egypt, Delhi, Malaysia, UK, Bahrain, Kuwait, India, Europe, Melbourne, USA & Canada
- Members: 1 million
- CEO: Sayed Hyderali Shihab Thangal
- National Volunteer President: Noushad MK
- Key people: Sayyid Munavvar Ali Shihab
- Subsidiaries: CH-CENTRE; White Guard Volunteers; AIKMCC
- Affiliations: Indian Union Muslim League, Overseas Indian organisations
- Expenses: (₹ 100-crore)
- Staff: 2,250
- Volunteers: 25,854
- Website: allindiakmcc.com

The Kerala Muslim Cultural Centre (KMCC) is an expatriate charity and volunteer organisation for Muslims from the Indian state of Kerala, formed in 1981. It was founded as an official organisation of the All India Muslim League (AIML) under Ummer Bafaki Tangal, and later merged with the Indian Union Muslim League (IUML).

== History ==
The two organisations that were active under the separate names of Chandrika Readers' Forum and Kerala Muslim Cultural Centre eventually merged with the merger of their parent organisations, and adopted a common name and operation. Since then, KMCC has promoted the welfare of expatriate Indians through relief activities, C.H. centers, social services such as the construction of houses for the poor, medical aid, educational assistance, and disaster relief.

== Branches ==
=== KMCC Delhi ===
KMCC Delhi was formed under the patronage of E. Ahamed, former Union Minister and President of the Indian Union Muslim League. Supreme Court advocate Haris Beeran is the current President.

KMCC Delhi has various programs from an admission help desk to scholarships and student hostels for various universities in Delhi. It organises various intellectual programs, talks, and lectures, including the annual Shihab Thangal Memorial Lectures and E. Ahamed Memorial Lectures. In 2018, the Shihab Thangal Memorial Lecture was delivered by Dr. Ansari, Member of Parliament and former Union Minister.

=== KMCC Dubai ===
KMCC's Dubai organisation conducts humanitarian programs including an insurance scheme for its registered members, Indian passport and council services, free medical and legal consultation camps once a month, as well as cultural and religious programs. KMCC Dubai also opened a help desk to collect the documents of Indian expats wishing to seek amnesty.

=== Other branches ===
- KMCC Abu Dhabi
- KMCC Melbourne Australia
- KMCC Malaysia
- KMCC Qatar
- KMCC Saudi Arabia
- KMCC USA and Canada
- KMCC Britain
