= Airport Road, Kozhikode =

Airport Road, Calicut
- Interactive map of Airport Road, Calicut
- Coordinates: 11.26457°N 75.81172°E
- Country: India

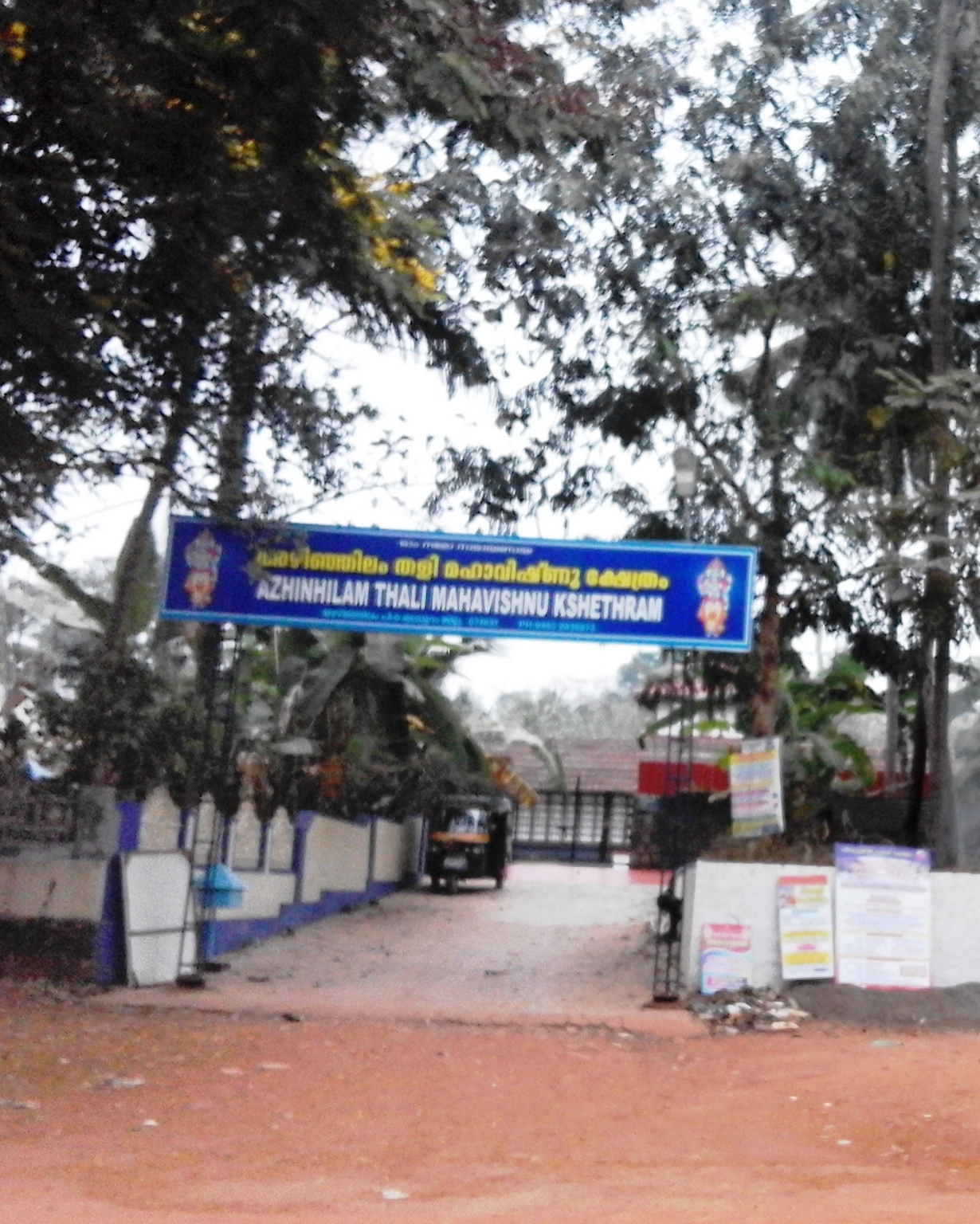
Azhinjilam Temple at Ramanattukara

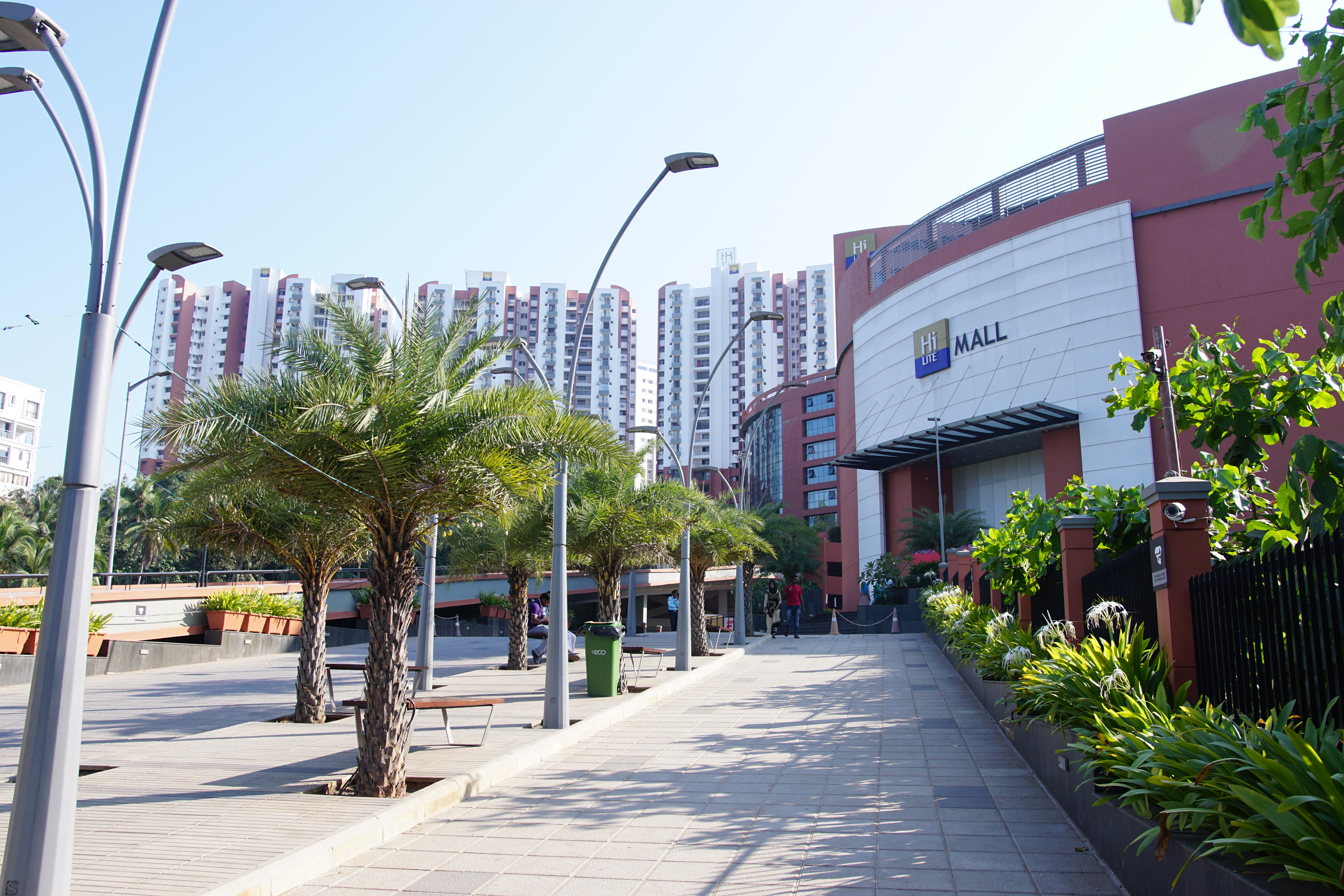
Palazhi means 'The Milky Road' in Malayalam

Airport Road, Kozhikode is an important road in Kozhikode, India. It extends from Thondayad Junction to Calicut Airport, about 20 km away. The road passes through Palazhi, Pantheeramkavu, Ramanattukara and Kondotty Thurakkal before reaching the airport.

== History ==
100 years ago, the beach area was the centre of the city of Kozhikode. In the 1970s, the downtown shifted to the Mananchira area, and in the 1980s, Mavoor Road became the centre of activity. In the 2010s, the Thondayad Bypass area and the suburb of Palazhi on the Airport road have emerged as the new city centres with a vibrant night life.

== Thondayad ==
Thondayad Junction is an important intersection in Kozhikode. This junction connects the city to the eastern towns of Kozhikode District so the traffic is heavy. The junction also connects to the northern and southern cities of Kerala by express roads. Thondayad Junction is accessed from Mavoor Road on the western side.

=== Major landmarks in Thondayad ===
- Vigilance and Anti-corruption office
- Narakath Bhagavathy Temple
- Kerala Kaumudi Newspaper
- Chinmaya Vidyalaya
- Azhthya Kovil Maha Vishnu Goshala Temple

== Palazhi Junction ==
Palazhi is a suburb of Kozhikode. It has risen to prominence recently because of the creation of a township called Hilite Mall. Palazhi is four kilometres from Thondayad Junction. Metro International Cardiac Center and the Cradle Maternity Hospital are situated in Palazhi.

Palazhi was originally a village with waterlogged streets during monsoons, creating problems for the residents. Recently the area has been highly commercialized because of the proximity to the highway and the eastern part of the city. The creation of Hilite Township and Hilite Mall has increased traffic issues in and around Palazhi.

=== Major landmarks in Palazhy ===
- Cyberpark Kozhikode
- Uralungal Cyberpark
- Mananthala Thazham Masjidh
- Metro International Cardiac Center
- Cradle Maternity Hospital
- Landmark World
- Koodathum Para Colony
- Mampuzha Bridge

== Methott Thazham ==
Methott Thazham is a small village on the western side of Palazhi. It is famous for the Bhayankavu Temple and the Ollur Shiva Temple. The suburbs of Vazhipokku, Manathal Thazham, Poomangalam, Mecheri Thazham, Kaithaparampu, Kattukulangara, and Kommeri are near Methott Thazham. Methott Thazham is directly connected by a main road to the Kottooli and Pottammal junctions.

== Hilite Township ==
Hilite township is a residential and commercial facility located at Palazhi junction. Hilite Mall is the most spacious shopping mall of north Kerala with 1,400,000 sq feet of shopping space. It is part of the Hilite City (11.256873°N 75.821287°E), an integrated township project.

== Pantheeramkavu Junction ==
Pantheeramkavu or Pantheerankavu is a small town near Kozhikode city in India. The name translates to "the place with twelve temples". Today Pantheeramkavu is a fast-growing town with a population of 45,495. Pantheeramkavu has a literacy rate of 84%, higher than the national average of 59.5%. Male literacy is 86%, and female literacy is 82%. 11% of the population is under 6 years of age.

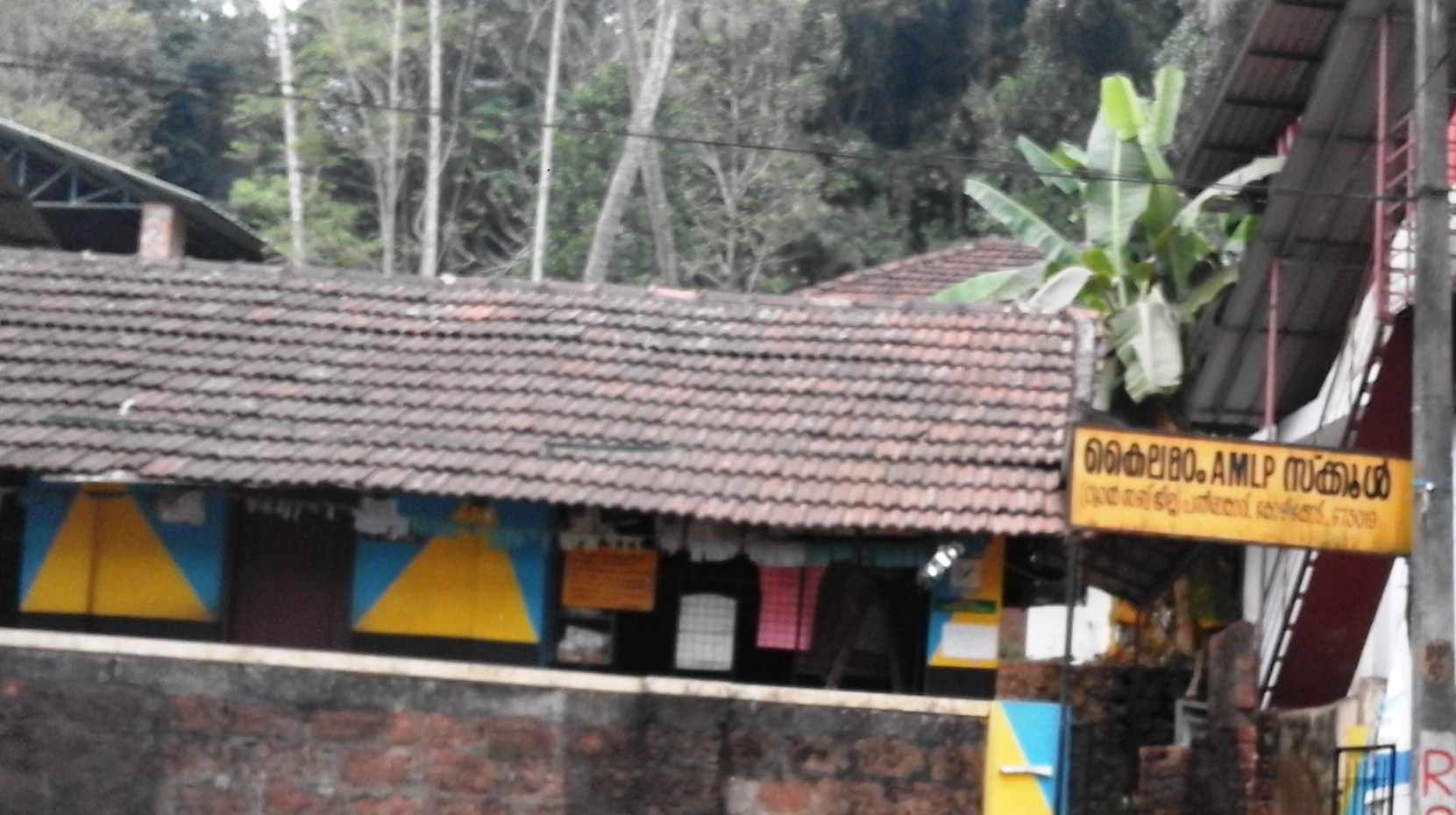
Kailamadam School, Pantheeramkavu

The road towards the east of Pantheerankavu connects the villages of Perumanna, Puthoor Madam, Mundupalam, Punathil Bazar and Payyadi Meethal. At the end of the road is the suburb of Palazhi. This locality is the home of the sprawling Hilite Mall and the township attached to it.

=== Regions of Pantheeramkavu ===
- Manikkadavu
- Nambi Kulam
- Kodal Nadakkavu
- Palazhi
- Iringallur
- Azhinjilam

=== Landmarks in Pantheeramkavu ===
- Murukanad Subramanya Temple, Kodalnadakkavu
- Kailamadom School, Perumanna Road

== Ramanattukara ==
Ramanattukara is the biggest town between Kozhikode and the airport. There are two busy road junctions in Ramanattukara. The first goes to the airport on the left side. The second, Nisari Junction, goes to the University of Calicut. The town is growing very fast due to the construction of many shopping malls and of Kadavu Resort, a 5-star hotel 2.5 kilometers from Ramanattukara. Ramanattukara acts as a major town in land routes between Calicut and towns such as Thrissur, Trivandrum, Manjeri and Coimbatore.

=== Tourist Attractions near Ramanattukara ===
- Kadalundi Bird Sanctuary, 9 km
- Chaliyam beach, 9 km
- Beypore Port, 9 km
- Homeo Road to Kuttoolangady, 1 km
- Commonwealth Tile Factory, 2 km

=== Major Organizations near Ramanattukara ===
- University of Calicut, 7 km
- Farook College, 3 km
- Alfarook College, 3 km
- Kinfra Industrial Park, 5 km
