= Thondayad Junction =

- Location in Kerala, India
- Coordinates: 11.26457°N 75.81172°E

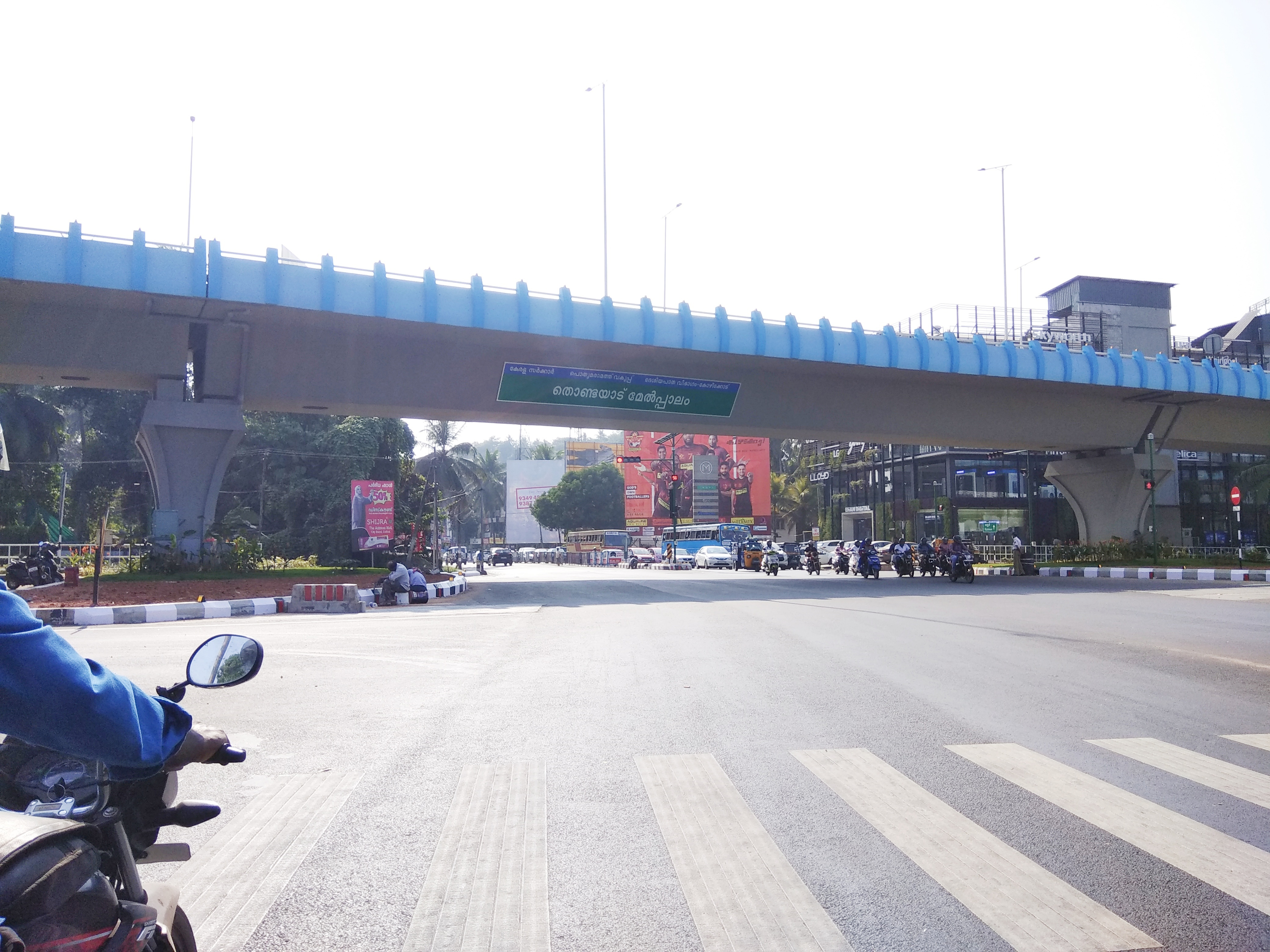
Thondayad Junction

Thondayad Junction is an important intersection of Kozhikode city, India. This junction connects the city to the eastern town of Kozhikode District so the traffic is heavy. The junction also connects to the northern and southern cities of Kerala by National highway 66

== History ==
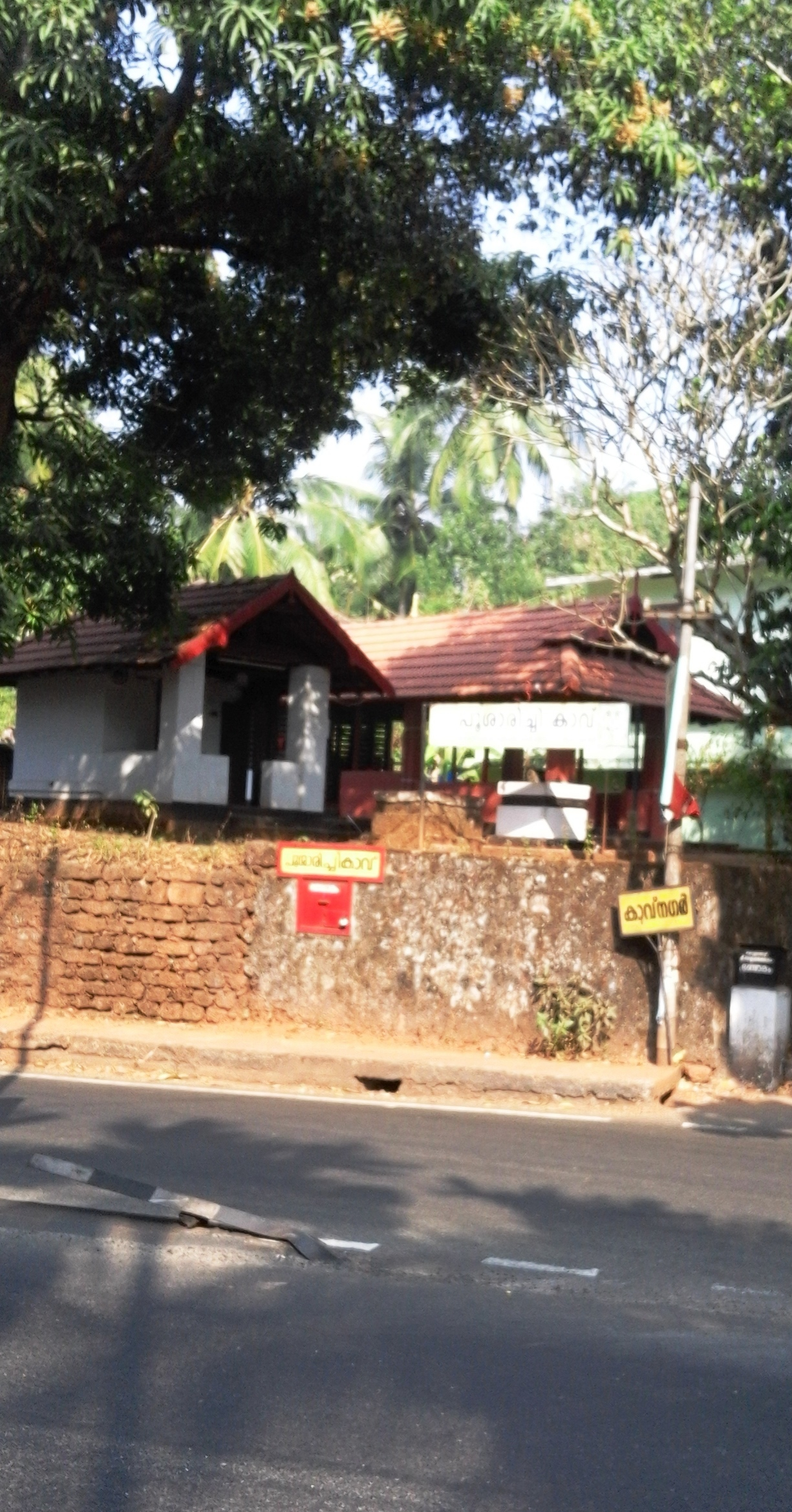
Poosharichikkavu Temple

Around 100 years ago the beach area was the centre of Kozhikode city. In the 1970s, the downtown shifted to the Mananchira area and again, in the 1980s, Mavoor Road became the centre of attraction in the city. In the 2010s, the Thondayad Bypass area and Palazhi on the Airport road emerged as the new city centre with a vibrant night life for foodies.

== Mavoor Road(towards mavoor road junction) ==
The road to the west takes you to Arayidathupalam, City Bus Stations and Mananchira pond.

== Mavoor Road(towards mavoor) ==
The road to the east goes to Chevayur, Kovoor, Medical College, Karanthur, Kunnamangalam Mavoor and mukkam .

== Kannur Road ==
The road to the north goes to Koyilandy, Vatakara, Thalassery and Kannur.

== Airport Road ==
The road to the south goes to Pantheerankavu, Ramanattukara and the Calicut International Airport

== Major Landmarks in Thondayad ==
- Vigilance and Anti-corruption office
- STARCARE HOSPITAL
- Eham Digital
- Edumart Hypermarket Mavoor Road
- Chinmaya Vidyalaya
- Narakath Bhagavathy Temple
- Azhthya Kovil Maha Vishnu Goshala Temple
- Mark developers villas Kavu stop Thondayadu
- Kavu Nagar

== See also ==
- Airport Road, Kozhikode
