= Chevarambalam =

Kozhikode Chevarambalam
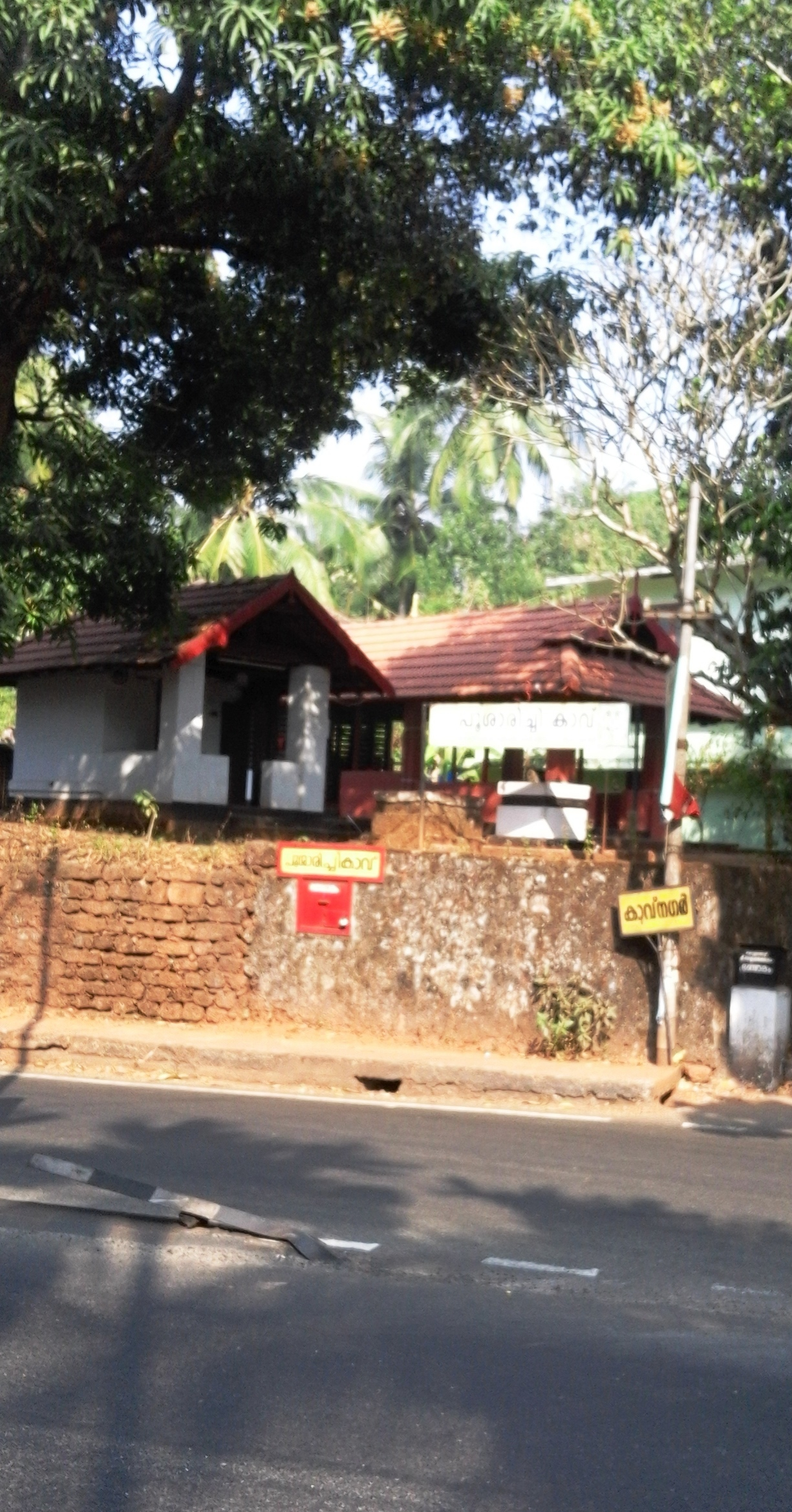
- Kavu Nagar
- Interactive map of Kozhikode Chevarambalam
- Coordinates: 11.27985°N 75.80674°E
- Country: India
- State: Kerala

Chevarambalam is a suburb of Kozhikode city. This residential layout lies between the Mavoor Road and the Wayanad Road.

== Important landmarks ==
Arulappadu Devi Temple, Unni Rarichan Temple and Subramania Temple are prominent places of worship in Chevarambalam.

Chevarambalam junction has four roads converging into a small town with Ruby Restaurant at its center. One road takes goes to Vellimadukunnu junction in the north. Another one goes to Iringadan Pally paddy fields. The roads going to the southwest connects with the Thondayad junction and Kudil Thodu area. The road going to southeast is called Golf Link Road and it connects Chevarambalam with Chevayur junction near the leprosy hospital and the vehicle testing grounds.

Chevarambalam has become a prominent residential locality of Kozhikode city. Vrindavan housing Colony, Kerala Residential colony and the Prisunic Apartments are the main residential pockets of Chevarambalam.

== Kirtads Museum ==
The Kirtads Museum, a museum of tribal artifacts and products maintained by the provincial government, is located in Chevarambalam. It also includes research and surveying facilities.

== See also ==
- Chevayur
- Silver Hills, Kozhikode
- Kottooly
- Thondayad
