= Arayidathupalam Junction =

- Interactive map of Arayidathupalam Junction

Location
- Coordinates: 11.25855°N 75.79193°E

Construction

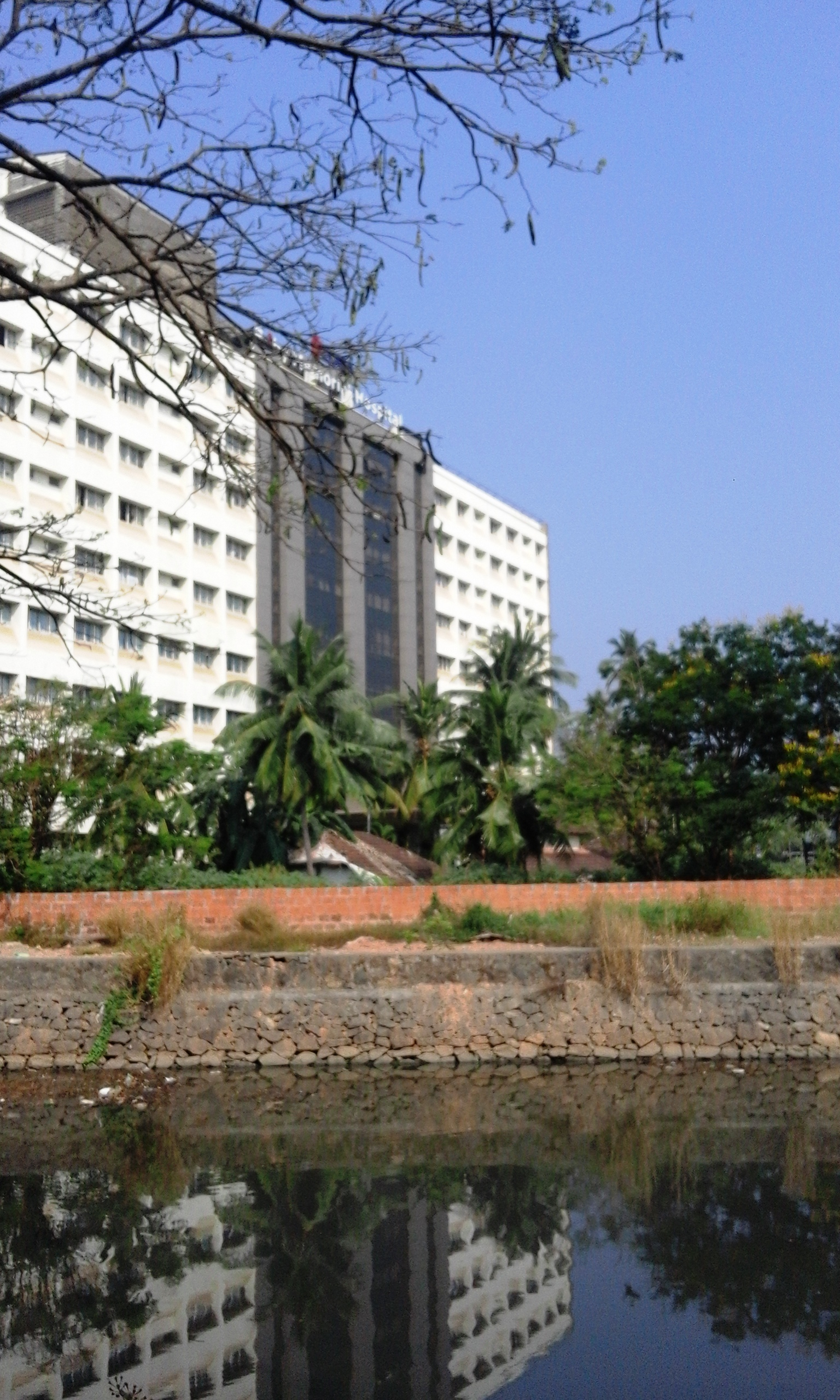
Baby Hospital, Arayidathupalam

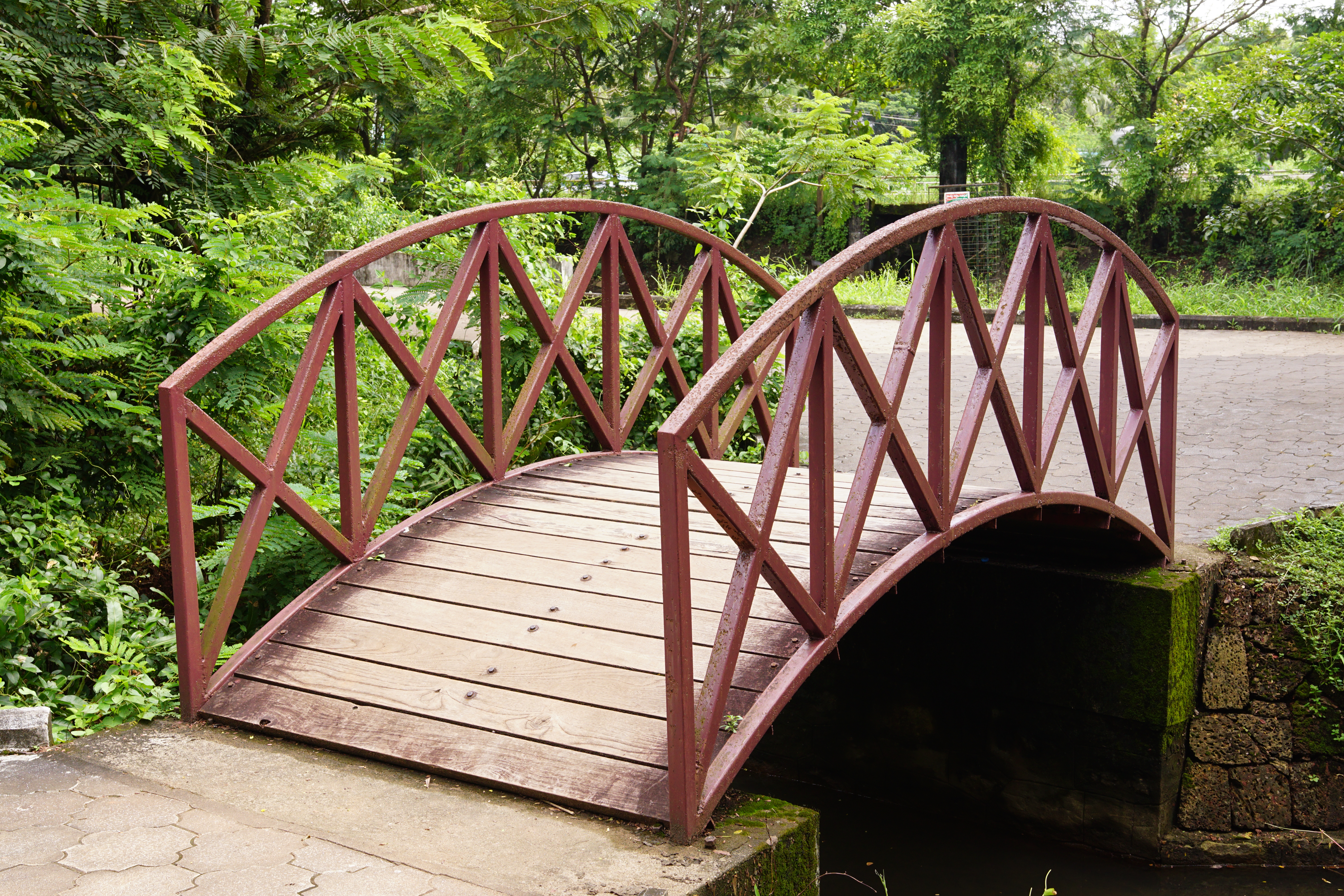
Sarovaram Bio Park, Arayidathupalam

Arayidathupalam Junction is the busiest road intersection of Kozhikode city in India.

== Mavoor Road ==
The western part of Mavoor Road is specifically referred to by that name. The New Bus Station and the KSRTC Bus Station are located in this road. The road has one of the busiest commercial parts of the city. The road ends in Mananchira Square.

== Medical College Road ==
The eastern road is called Medical College Road but it goes all the way to Mavoor village. Calicut Medical College is located in this road. City suburbs like Kovoor Town, Chevayur, Kottooli and Pottammal are also located in this road.

== Kannur Road ==
The northern road goes all the way to Kannur and Mangalore.

== Meenchantha Bypass ==
The southern road crosses the Kalluthan Kadavu bridge and goes all the way to Malappuram and other southern cities of Kerala.

== Major Organizations in Arayidathupalam ==
- Baby Memorial Hospital
- Vasan Eye Care Hospital
- Alsalama Eye care Hospital
- Commonwealth Trust Eye care Hospital
- District Prison
- Sarovaram Bio Park
- Varthaka Bhavan, Stadium Road
- Taluk Office, Stadium Road
- Emirates, Meenchantha Road
- BEM School, Stadium Road

== See also ==
- Mavoor Road
- Pottammal
- Kottooly
