= Mavoor Road =

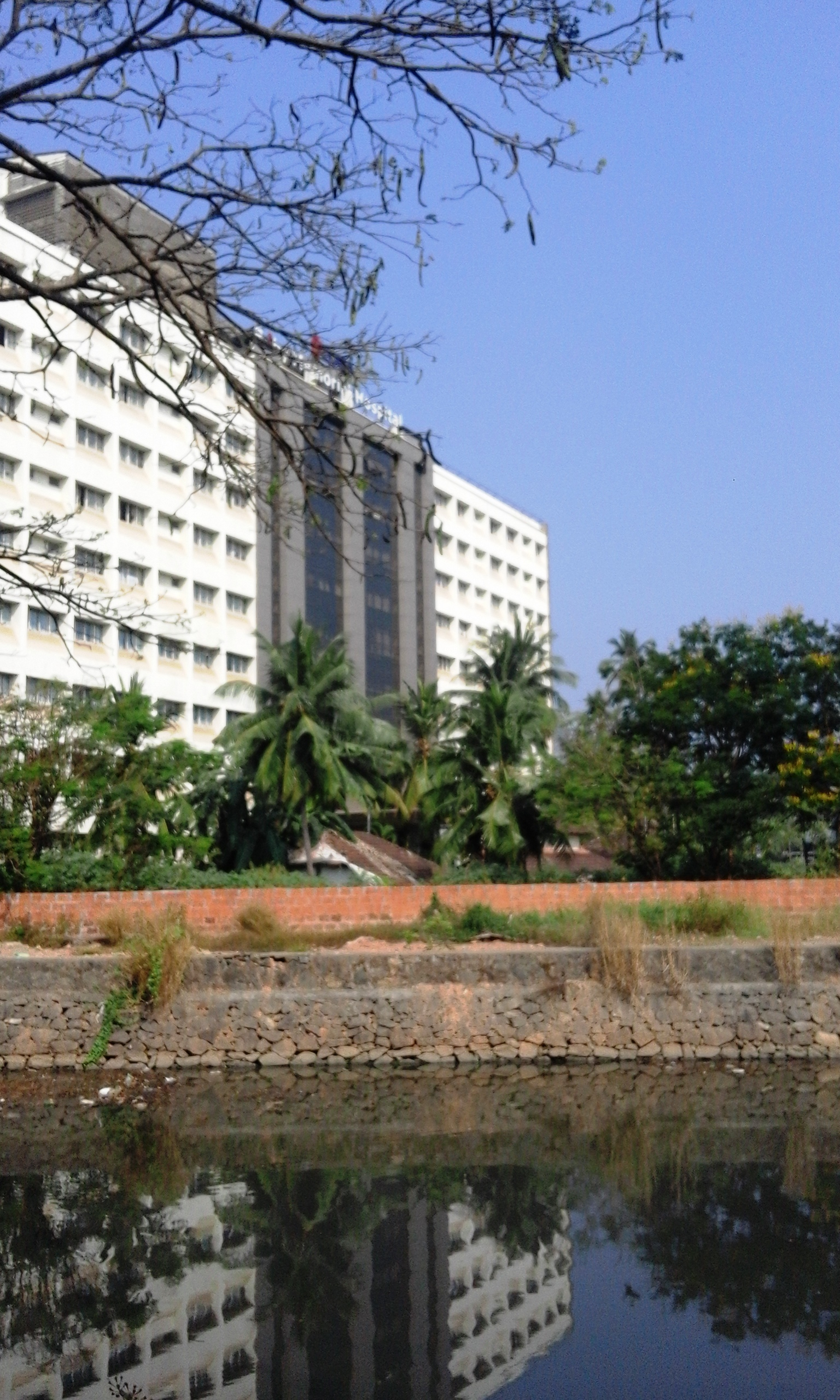
Baby Memorial Hospital, Mavoor Road

Mavoor Road is the busiest High street of Kozhikode city in Kerala, India. This road connects the Mananchira pond area with the Kozhikode Medical College. After the medical college, the road is extended further to the little village of Mavoor but the term 'Mavoor Road' refers to the section between the city and the Medical college.

== History ==
100 years ago the beach area was the centre of Kozhikode city. In the 1970s the downtown shifted to Mananchira area and again, in the 1980s, Mavoor Road became the centre of attraction. In 2010s, Thondayad Bypass area and Palazhi on the Airport road has emerged as the new city centre with a vibrant night life.

== Jaffer Khan Colony ==
Jaffer Khan Street is a commercial locality in the heart of Kozhikode city. This colony is located opposite to the new bus station in the Mavoor Road. The street has a Muslim flavor because of a large number of perfume shops frequented by Arab visitors. The locality also has many mosques, a Hajj house and several Sunni cultural centres. The Oyiska Youth Centre is located on the other side of the Jaffer Khan Colony across the footpath on the swamp. The Brahmakumaris have a big meditation centre in this colony. The northern end of the street is called Ashokapuram.

- Bhima Jewellers
- H & C Books
- South Indian Bank
- Space Mall
- Edumart Academic Hypermarket
- ICAI Bhavan
- LaVesta Cafe
- More Supermarket

== The Planetarium ==
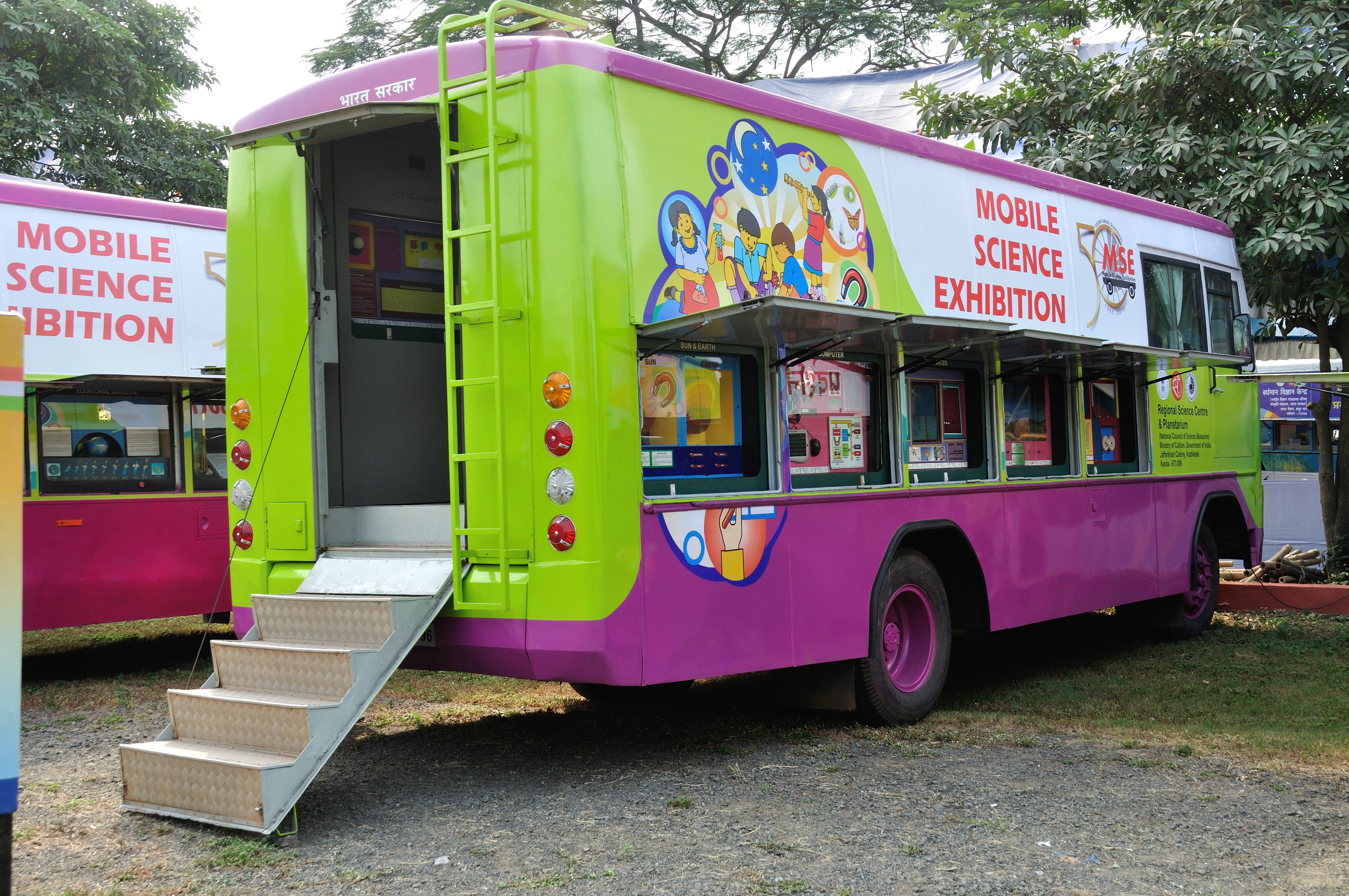
Planetarium Kozhikode

The Regional Science Centre and Planetarium is a popular destination of schoolchildren. This facility is maintained by the Central Government. There are regular exhibitions and shows inside the campus. In addition to the main show, the centre also has a theatre for 3-D demonstrations for the children. The compound is also very spacious and attractive.

== Balan K Nair Road ==
Balan K Nair Road begins from near the Zoological Survey of India near Jaffer Khan colony. It connects to Rajendra Nursing Home and Nadakkavu localities. K.P.Chandran Road moves in the opposite direction and connects to Sarovaram Bio Park. The road to the northern side connects to Jawahar Nagar and Kottaram Road areas.

== KSRTC Bus Station ==
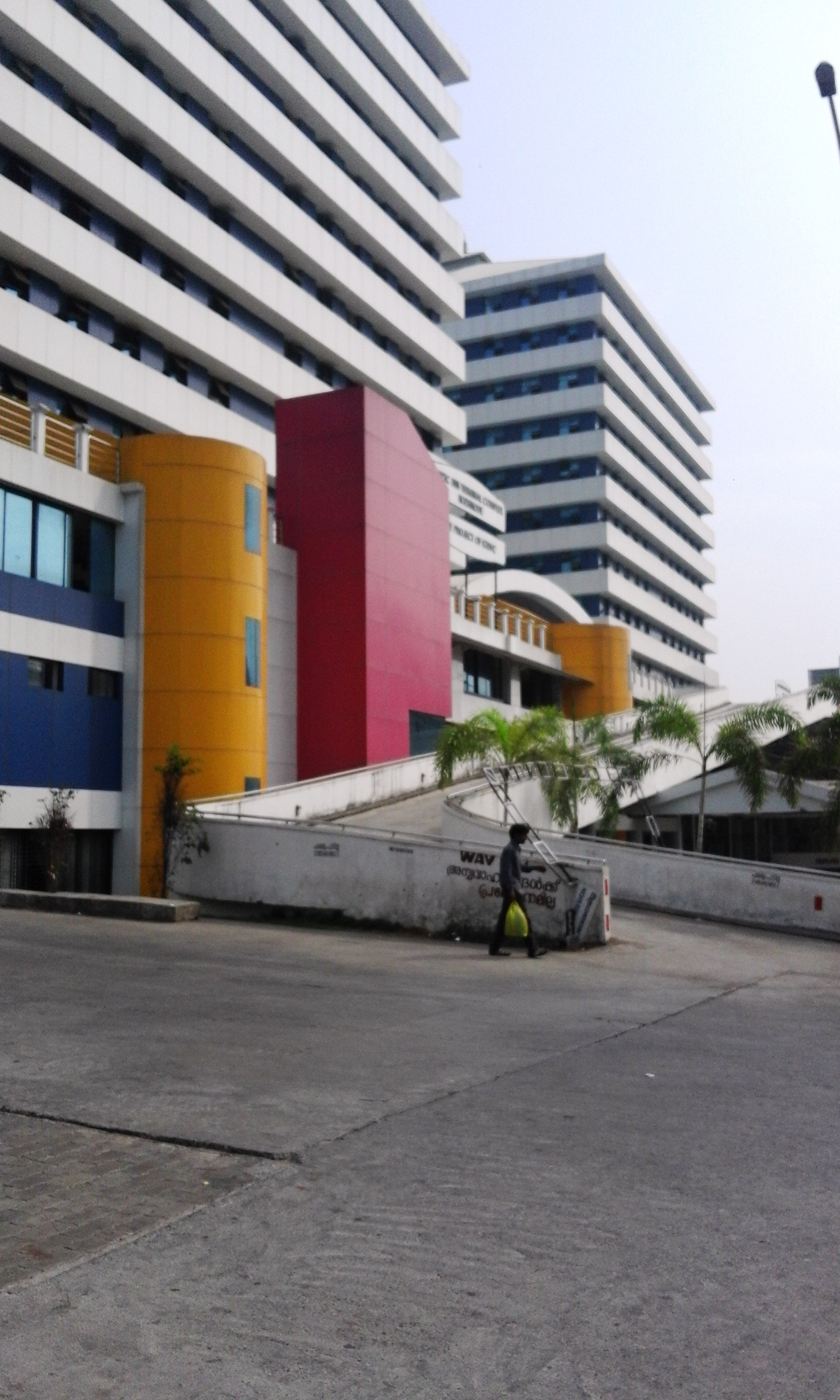
The New KSRTC Bus Station has 350,000 sq.ft. floor space

KSRTC Kozhikode is the biggest bus station of North Kerala in India. It is situated on the Mavoor Road on the western side of Kozhikode city. The shopping facility attached to the bus station has a plinth area of 350,000 sq.feet. Parking space is provided for 270 cars.

== U.K.Shankaran Road ==
U.K.Shankaran Road is a small street starting from the opposite side of L.B.S.Computer College on the Mavoor Road. This street has Our College, Madhyamam City office and an SIO office. The road diverts to the western side and ends up at the Animals Hospital on the Wayanad Road.

== Ashokapuram ==
Ashokapuram Junction connects Mavoor Road with the Nadakkavu area. Ashokapuram has prominent organizations like Rajendra Nursing Home, IHRD College, Marx Engels Bhavan and BSNL GM Office.

== Junctions ==
- Mavoor Road Junction
- Rajaji Road Junction
- Arayidathupalam Junction
- Thondayad
- Chevayur
- Kovoor
- Medical College

== Commercial ==
Mavoor Road is a high end Commercial Street there are several IT Training Centres, Salons, Gyms, Supermarkets, Retail Stores and Boutique, Banks, Airline Office, Restaurants that have opened up on the stretch

Supermarkets

- Reliance Fresh, Pottammal
- Big Bazaar
- Nesto Hypermarket, Gokulam Galleria Mall Arayidathupalam Junction

Jewellery

- Chemmanur International Jewellers
- Kalyan Jewellers, Parayanchery
- Tanishq
- Meralda Jewels, Parayanchery
- Lulu Gold, Parayanchery
- Cammilli Diamond And Gold, Parayanchery
- Sunny Diamonds, Parayanchery
- Regal Jewellers, Patteri
- Bhima Jewellers, Kottooli

Banks

- Federal Bank
- Axis Bank, Parayanchery
- Catholic Syrian Bank, Parayanchery
- IDBI Bank, Kottooli
- ICICI Bank, Pottammal
- State Bank Of India, Pottammal
- Ujjivan Small Finance Bank
- Kerala Gramin Bank
- Canara Bank
- Union Bank of India
- Central Bank of India
- Syndicate Bank

Restaurants & cafes

- Barbeque Nation, Parayanchery
- KFC, RP Mall
- Brown Town By Paragon, Pottammal
- Bun Club
- Sijis Pizza Street
- Savoury Seashell Restaurant, Parayanchery
- Favrolls
- Burger Lounge
- Frapino
- Oyalo Pizza
- Indian Coffee House
- ChicKing, Pottammal
- Frootree
- Natural Ice Creams
- Calicut Karachi Durbar
- Pizza Hut
- Sagar Restaurant
- Domino’s Pizza
- Cold Street

𝗦𝗵𝗼𝗽𝗽𝗶𝗻𝗴 𝗠𝗮𝗹𝗹𝘀

- RP Mall - Reliance Trends, KFC, Ashirvad Cineplexx
- Gokulam Galleria Mall - Nesto Hypermarket, Westside, Easybuy, Max Fashion, Cinépolis, Pantaloons, Amoeba, Skechers, Basics, Jockey, Toni & Guy, ChicKing, Subway, Lenskart, Bata, Swiss Time House, Galito’s, and Store, W
- Kalyan Mall Thondayad

Retail stores

- Kasavu Kendra Wedding Center
- Helio Police, Bata, Woodland, Nandilath G Mart
- Big Bazaar, Calicut Silks
- MyG, Pottammal
- Kannankandy E store, Bridal Silks
- Silk Mandir
- Van Heusen, Allen Solly, Levis, US Polo Assn,
- Linen Club, Shobhika Wedding Mall, Kalyan Silks, The Raymond Shop

== Landmarks ==
- KSRTC Bus Stand Cum Shopping Complex
- Kairali Sree Theater
- The LBS Centre for Science and Technology
- Moffusil Bus Stand (New Bus stand Calicut)

== Hospitals ==
- National Hospital
- Baby Memorial Hospital
- Government Medical College, Kozhikode

Laboratories & clinic

- R Cell Diagnostics & Research Center
- Micro Health Laboratories Pvt. Ltd
- Dr Scan Diagnostic Center
- DDRC SRL Diagnostics Pvt.Ltd
- Mother Dental Hospital
- Abeer Family Medical Center

== Mavoor Road after Medical College ==
The term Mavoor Road is used only for the 8.3 km stretch of road between Mananchira and Calicut Medical College. The road goes another 13 km and ends in Mavoor town. This second stretch of Mavoor Road has many important towns and villages like:

- Parayanchery
- Kottooli and Pottammal
- Thondayad
- Chevayur
- Kovoor
- Peruvayal
- Perumanna
- Mavoor

== Educational institutions ==
- Presentation Higher Secondary School Chevayur

== See also ==
- Chevayur
- Kottooli and Pottammal
- Kovoor Town
- Kuttikkattoor and Velliparamba
- Devagiri College
