= Palazhi =

Suburb of Kozhikode city

Palazhi പാലാഴി
- Suburb
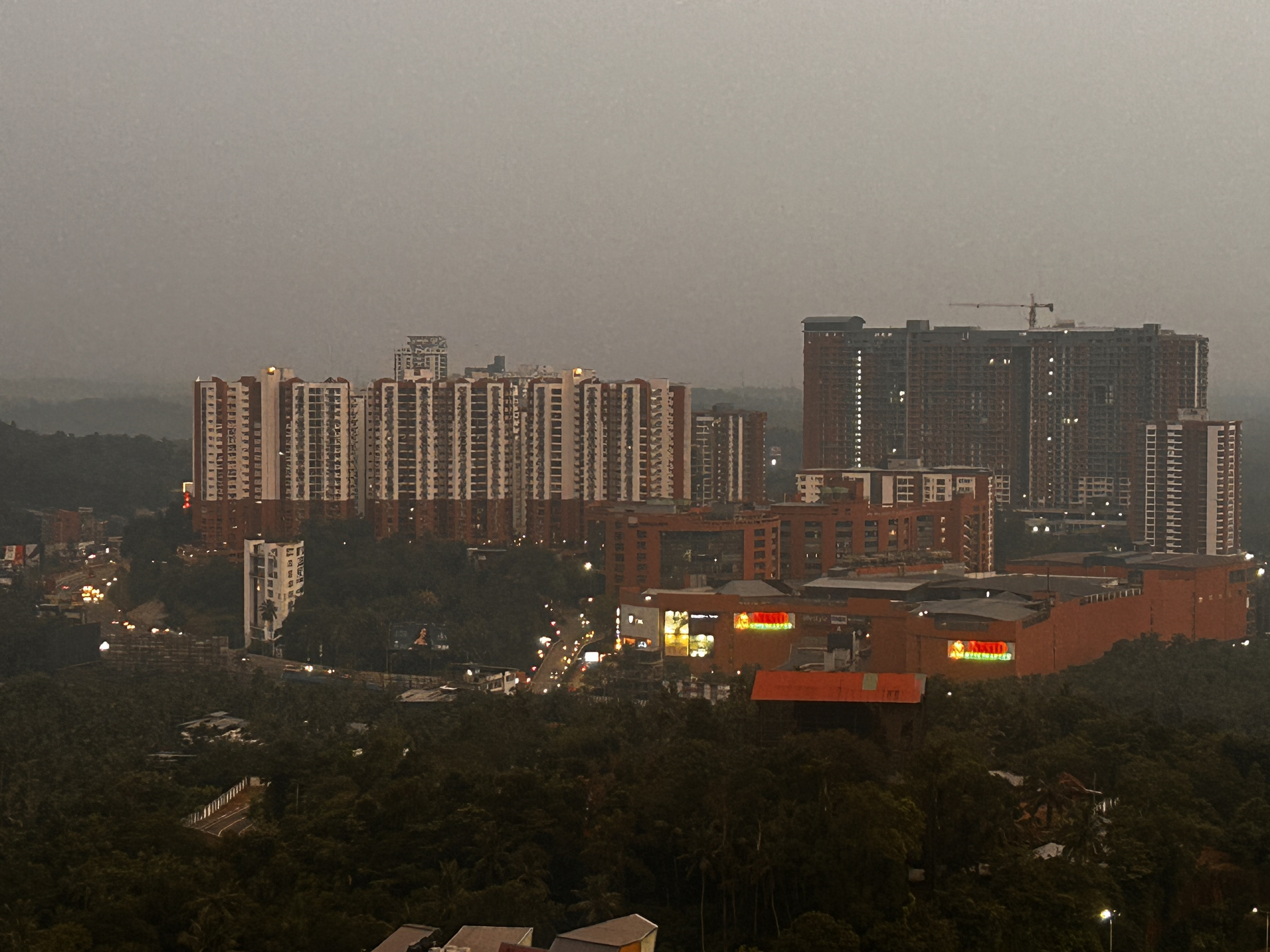
- HiLite City in 2025.
- Interactive map of Palazhi
- Coordinates: 11°14′55″N 75°50′30″E
- Country: India
- State: Kerala
- District: Kozhikode

Government
  - Body: Olavanna Grama Panchayat

Area
  - Total: 2.65 km^{2} (1.02 sq mi)

Population (2011)
  - Total: 13,746
  - Density: 5,190/km^{2} (13,400/sq mi)

Languages
  - Official: Malayalam, English
- Time zone: UTC+5:30 (IST)
- PIN: 673014
- Telephone code: +91-495
- Vehicle registration: KL-11
- Nearest city: Kozhikode
- Lok Sabha constituency: Kozhikode
- Civic agency: Olavanna Grama Panchayat
- Climate: Humid (Köppen)

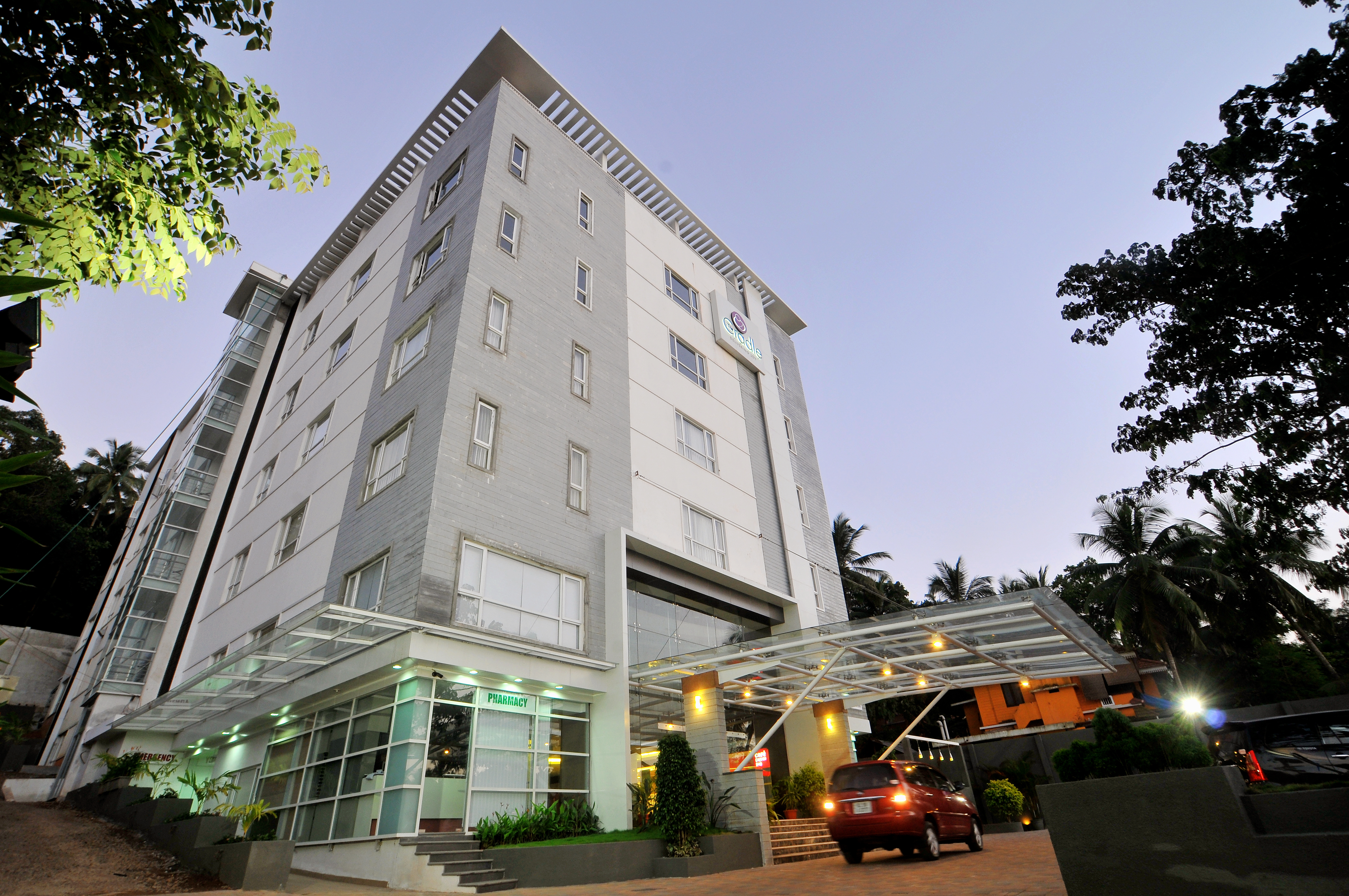
Cradle Hospital, Palazhi

Palazhi is a suburb of Kozhikode in the Indian state of Kerala. It has risen to prominence recently because of the Cyberpark Campus, a campus that includes Government Cyberpark (SAHYA), UL Cyberpark and the ULCCS One Anthem. Palazhi is also home to various other high-rises and infrastructure such as the HiLITE City township and Landmark World with various other projects upcoming as of 2026. Palazhi is four kilometers from Thondayad Junction in Kozhikode City. Metro International Cardiac Center and the Cradle Maternity hospital are situated at Palazhi. The Mampuzha river passes through the outer areas of Palazhi, i.e. Kannamchinnam.

== History ==
In the 1920s, the beach area was the centre of the city of Kozhikode. In the 1970s, the downtown shifted to the Mananchira area, and in the 1980s, Mavoor Road became the centre of activity. In the 2010s, the Thondayad Bypass area and the suburb of Palazhi on the Airport road have emerged as the new city centres with a vibrant night life.

Palazhi was originally a village with waterlogged streets in monsoon creating problems for the residents. In the 2010s, it has been highly commercialized because of the proximity to NH66 and the eastern part of the city. The creation of HiLITE City and HiLITE Mall in 2015 has increased traffic issues in and around Palazhi. The Cyberpark area also saw rapid development, starting with its establishment on 28th January 2009, followed by UL Cyberpark's inauguration on February 27th 2016, the Government Cyberpark (SAHYA) building on May 29th 2017, and finally the first residential project in the area, the ULCCS One Anthem, the first ever residential project by the 100-year old Uralangal Labour Contract-Co-operative Society, completed on May 8th 2023.

== Methottuthazham ==
Methottuthazham is a small village on the western side of Palazhi. This place is famous for the Bhayankavu Temple and the Ollur Shiva Temple. City suburbs like Vazhipokku, Manathal Thazham, Poovangal, Mecheri Thazham, Kaithapadam, Kattukulangara and Kommeri are near to Methott Thazham. Methott Thazham is directly connected by a main road to Kottooli and Pottammal junctions.

== Flooded Streets ==
Every year, the streets of Palazhi area gets flooded from June to August. During this period, access to the houses in this area becomes very difficult either by foot or by vehicles. As the flooded area is quite large, no solutions have been devised yet for this issue.

== HiLITE Township ==
HiLITE township is a residential and commercial facility located at Palazhi junction. HiLITE Mall is the largest shopping mall of North Kerala with 1,400,000 sq feet of shopping space. It is part of the HiLITE City (11.256873°N 75.821287°E), an integrated township project almost completed now. The actor Nirmal Palazhi is from this place.

== Landmarks in Palazhi ==
- Cyberpark Kozhikode - SEZ (Special Economic Zone) site established in 2009, official SAHYA building inaugurated 2017.
- ULCCS One Anthem - ULCCS' first residential project and the first in the Cyberpark, inaugurated 2023.
- UL Cyberpark - A privately owned Cyberpark by ULCCS inaugurated in 2016.
- Metro International Cardiac Center
- Cradle Maternity Hospital
- Landmark World - near the Olavanna Toll Plaza.
- HiLITE City - A township created by the HiLite Group in 2015, includes the HiLite Mall.
- Hidaya group of institutions
- Palazhi Timber
- Koodathum Para Colony
- Mampuzha Bridge - Near Payyadimeethal, outskirts of Palazhi.
- Nesto Hypermarket - Inside HiLite Mall
- Domino's Pizza - Inside HiLite Mall
- Sri Thrikkaippatta Subramanya Mahakshethram - A 1,400 year old temple (likely sometime c.624 CE) undergoing restoration, with the main temple being inaugurated on 20th May 2024, inside the Cyberpark Campus.

== Notable people ==
Nirmal Palazhi — Malayalam Actor & Comedian

== See also ==
- Airport Road, Kozhikode
