= Parayanchery =

Parayancheri
- Interactive map of Parayancheri
- Coordinates: 11.15263°N 75.47479°E
- Place: India
- State: Kerala
- District: Kozhikode
- Time zone: UTC+5:30 (IST)
- PIN: 673016

Parayancheri is a small town in the easternmost part of Calicut city (also known as Kozhikode City) in the Indian state of Kerala.

== Transport ==
- Railway station - Kozhikode Railway Station, 2.09 km
- Airport - Calicut International Airport, 21.50 km
- Port - Beypore Port
- Indira Gandhi Mofussil Bus Station - Kozhikode
- Palayam Bus Station - Kozhikode
- K.S.R.T.C Bus Station - Mavoor Road, Kozhikode

== Education ==
- Government Boys Higher Secondary School
- Government Vocational Higher Secondary School
- Government Girls’ Higher Secondary School
- G.L.P.S
- Hill Top Public School

== Notable residents ==
- S. K. Pottekkatt - teacher, novelist, travelogue writer, member of Indian parliament
- Thikkodiyan - poet, novelist, producer at All India Radio
