= Kirtads Museum =

The Kerala Institute for Research Training and Development Studies of Scheduled Castes and Scheduled Tribes is an apex institute located in Chevarambalam in Kozhikode district of Kerala.

It is a directorate under the Government of Kerala and functions under the SC and ST Department. Its main objective is to carry out research that helps to promote development among the scheduled communities in Kerala. It also attempts to identify the needs and problems confronting the marginalized section of the population and suggest recommendations to the government in finding a panacea for their overall development.

The institute was established in the year 1970 as Tribal Research and Training Center in a national pattern and works among all the scheduled communities for their development. The institute is situated in Vrindavan Colony, Chevayur, Kozhikode. Apart from Anthropological Research, the institute also has training and development studies activities. The institute also has a reference library and ethnological museum as an auxiliary wing.

== Museum ==
The Ethnological Museum holds artefacts in tribal history; exhibits include clothes, household utensils, bows and arrows, musical instruments, wood carvings, plant specimens and ceremonial paraphernalia.

== See also ==
- Kerala Institute for Research, Training and Development Studies of Scheduled Castes and Scheduled Tribes (KIRTADS)
