= Kottooli and Pottammal =

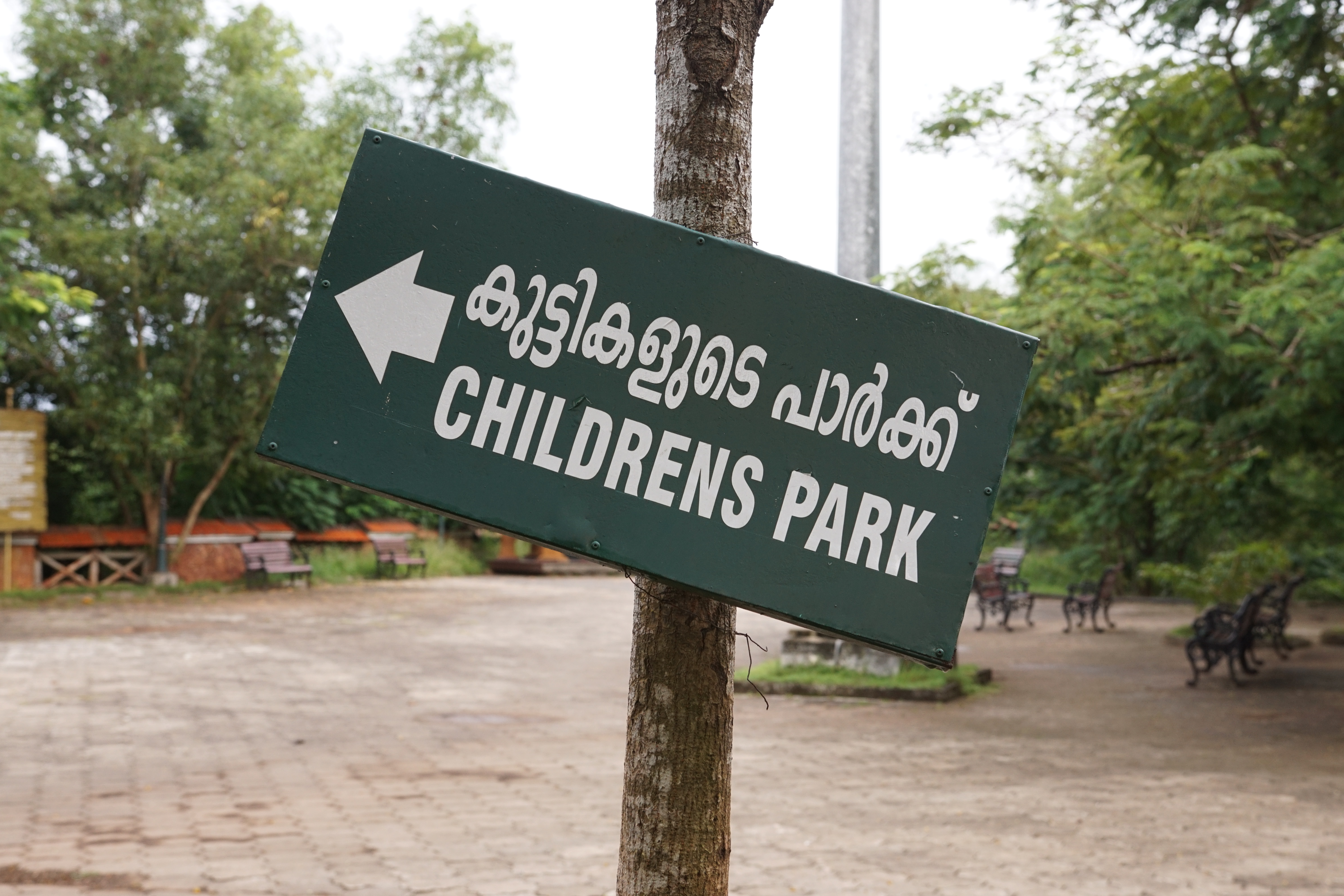
- Sarovaram Biopark
- Interactive map of Kottooli and Pottammal
- Coordinates: 11.25919°N 75.80657°E
- Country: India
- State: Kerala

Kottooly and Pottammal are two nearby junctions on the eastern side of Kozhikode city in India. They are at a distance of 650 meters. The Mavoor Road originates from Mananchira area in downtown Calicut and proceeds to Arayidathu-palam junction through the KSRTC bus station and the new bus station areas.

== Kottooly Junction ==
After Arayidathupalam, Kottooly is the main junction where the road to the north is called K.T.Gopalan Road which connects to Vellimadukunnu area. The road on the south connects to Kuthiravattam Mental Hospital on Puthiyara Road (Angattil Damodaran Nair Road) and connects to Govindapuram, Kozhikode and Mankavu through the Balakrishnan Road. The northern side of Kottooli junction is called Kottooli Center and this small township is connected to Nethaji Ngar, Chevarambalam and Sarovaram Bio Park.

== Pottammal Junction ==
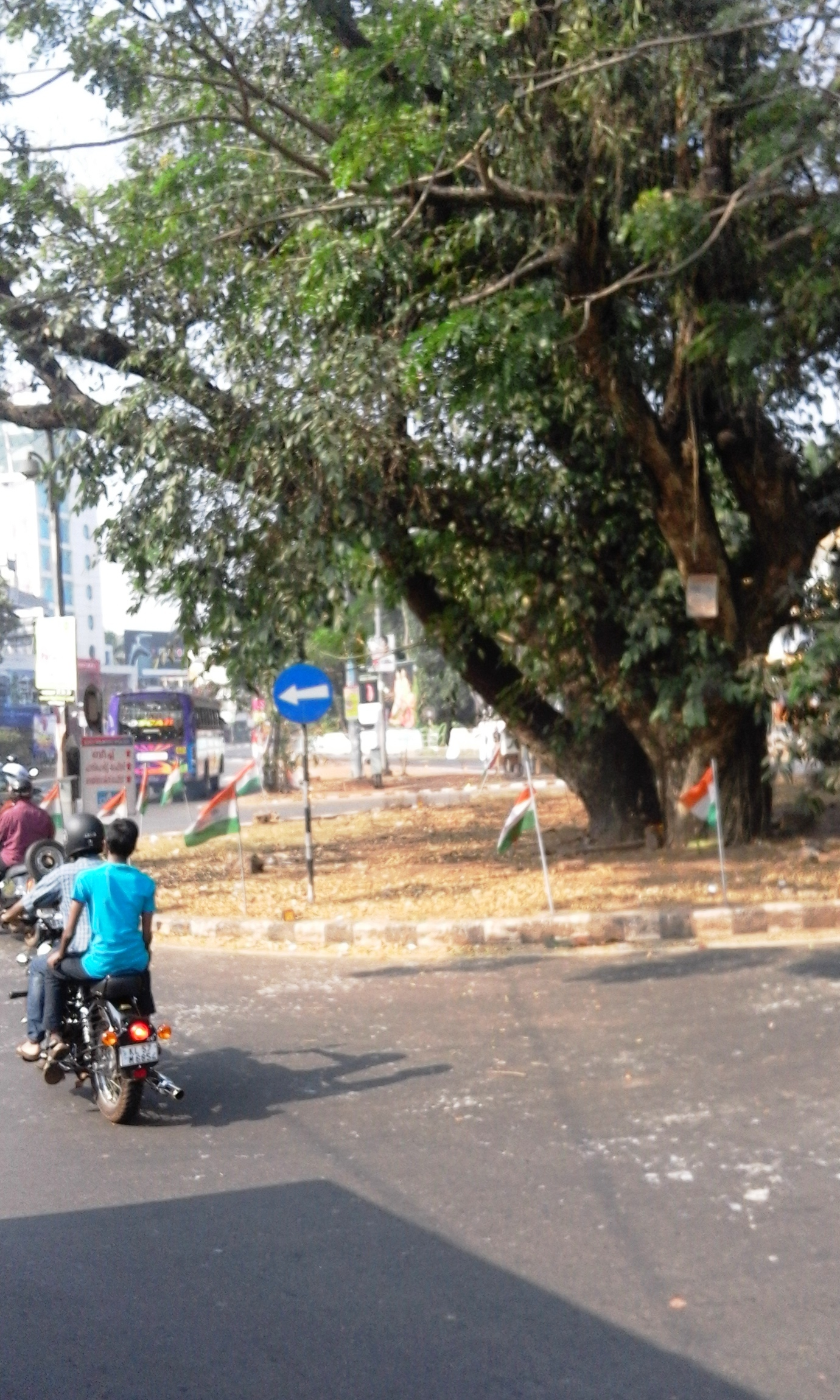
Pottammal Junction

Pottammal and Kottooly junctions are only 650 meters apart. The road going West from Pottammal connects back to the city through the Puthiyara route. The road going South connects to Palazhi and Hilite Mall areas. The main road or Mavoor Road further moves to Calicut Medical College through Thondayad junction, Chevayur junction and Kovoor town.

== Sarovaram Bio Park ==
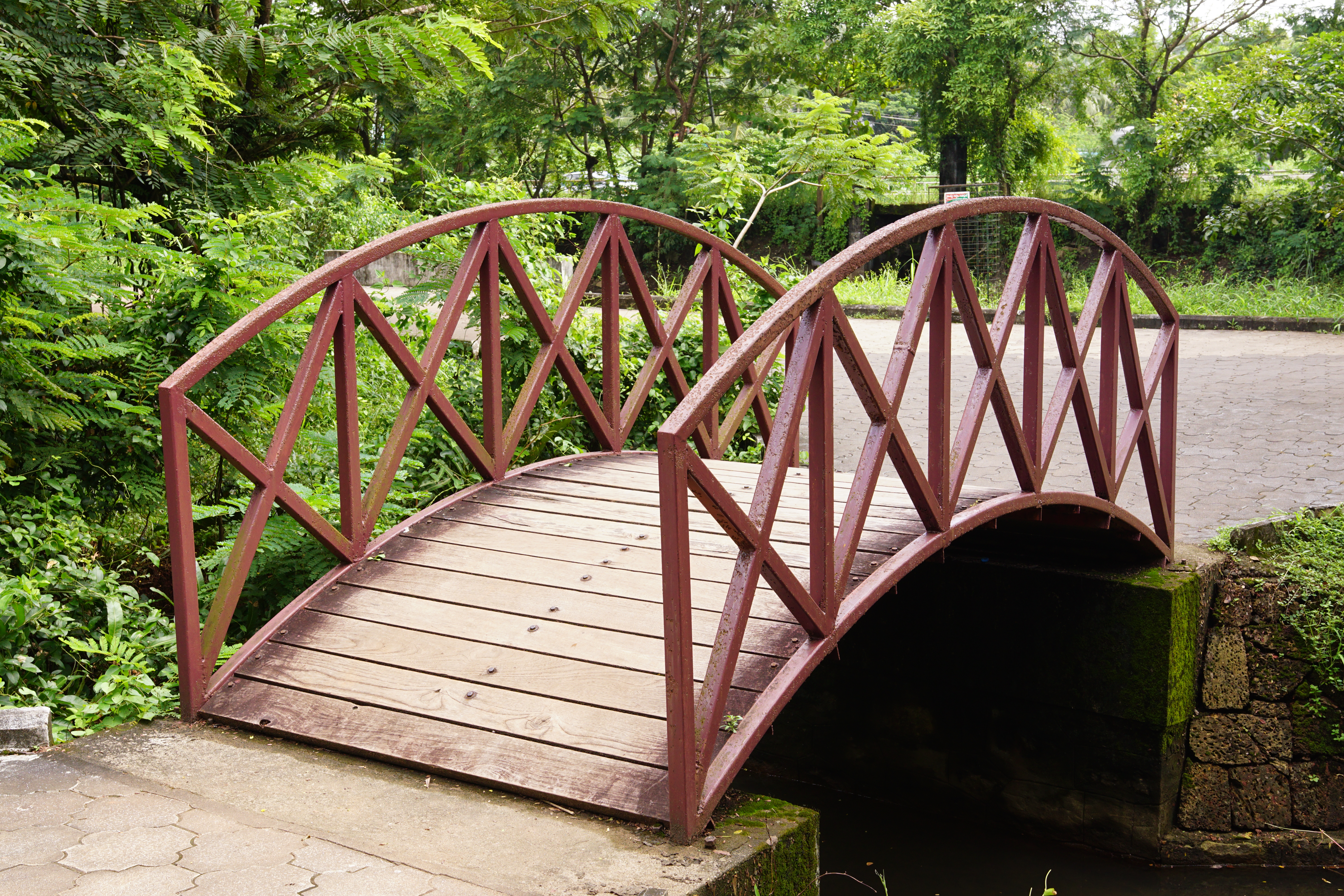
Entrance to the Sarovaram Biopark, Kottooly

Sarovaram Bio Park is a special Eco-tourism project of Kerala government. The park contains walking tracks, boating facility, open air theatre and a children's park. Quite recently the park has developed a reputation as a hangout of college couples.

== Kottooly Wetlands ==
Canoli Canal is on the western side of Kottooly and Chempra stream is on the northern side of it. Kottooly has a vast water-logged area with out-growths of mangroves in the boundaries is situated in the north-western side. This wet land has attracted the attention of biologists and environmentalists of late.

The Kottuli wetland is the largest Eco-patch in the Kozhikode city limits. It is interlinked with the man-made Canoly Canal which receives tidal influx from the Kallai and Korapuzha estuaries. Originally, a part of this wetland with an area of about 87.04 hectares (215.1 acres) of land was used for rice cultivation. Of this, 22.5 hectares of land has been reclaimed for human settlement and the reclamation is continuing. A portion of the wetland has been proposed for development of the Dream City, with a view to making it a part of Kozhikode, a tourist attraction.

The portion of the wetland, now intact, is mainly on the eastern periphery of the Eranhipalam-Arayedathupalam stretch of Canoly Canal. Studies conducted by Center for Water Resources Development and Management (CWRDM)) and others have highlighted the efficacy of this wetland in the ecosystem of Kozhikode. It is a major receptacle of flood water from the city, a primary recharge source for wells in the vicinity, sink for pollutants including city and hospital waste and a rich mangrove habitat.

The Kottuli wetland is an ideal habitat for estuarine fish, prawns, crustaceans and molluscs, wetland flora and fauna including avia, fauna and the endangered Asian otter (Lutrus lutrus).

The wetland system has been subjected to degradation and loss of biodiversity owing to reclamation, pollution and human intervention, the CWRDM action plan highlights. It comes under the CRZ Regulation Zone I of CRZ Notification. The Management Action Plan (MAP) of the Centre for Water Resources Development and Management (CWRDM) had come out with a plan in 2005 for conservation of the fragile Kottuli wetland with a multi-dimensional approach to preserve the Eco-patch. This had resulted in wide attention from people of all walks of life. The activities under map envisaged mangrove afforestation, desilting, pollution abatement, weed control, fishery development, conservation of biodiversity and awareness creation among local inhabitants and city-dwellers.
