= ChicKing =

Arabian fast food restaurant chain

- The ChicKing logo

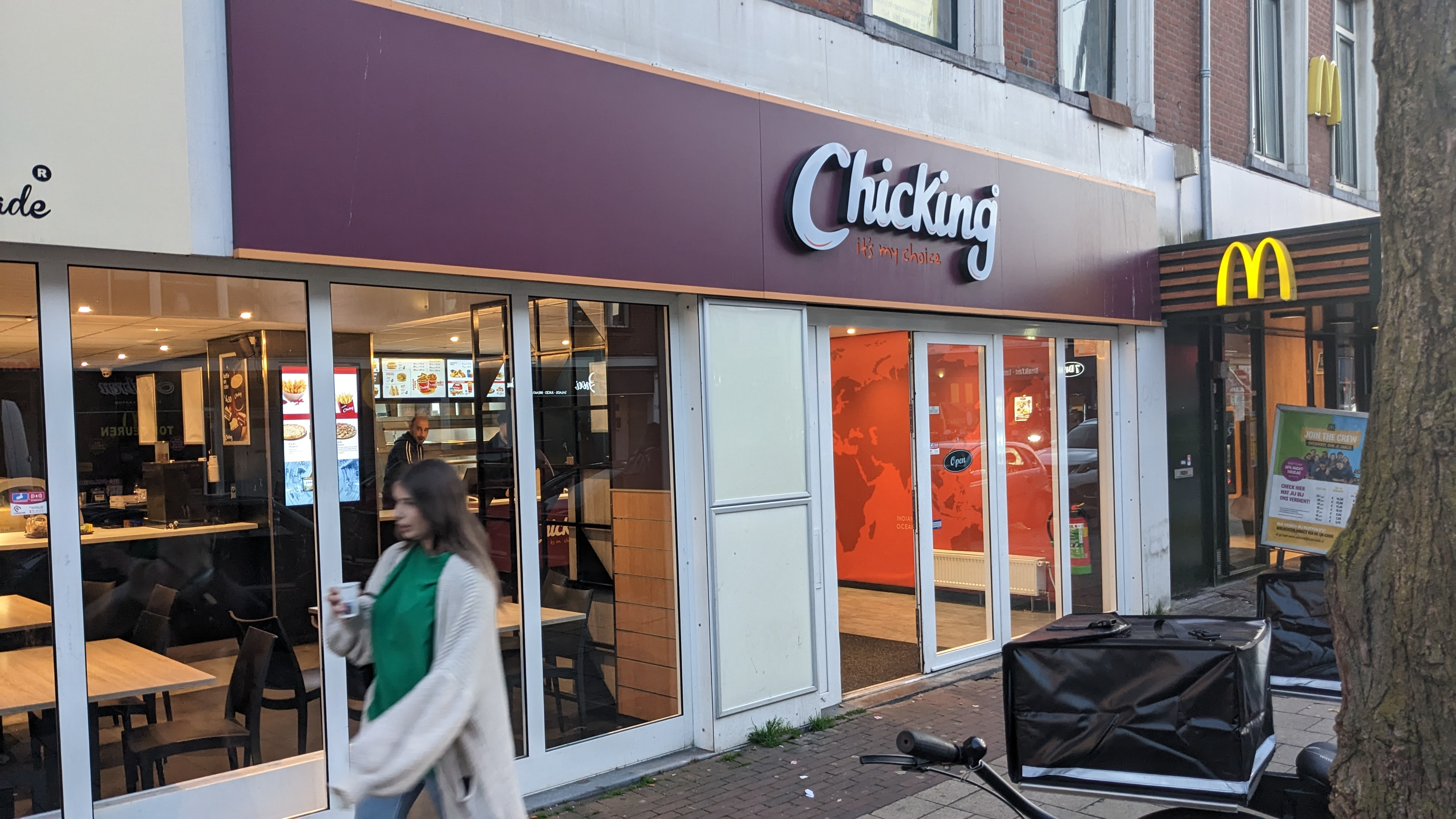
- A ChicKing restaurant in Rotterdam, Netherlands
- Type: Private
- Industry: Restaurant
- Genre: Fast food restaurant
- Founded: 2000; 26 years ago in Dubai, United Arab Emirates
- Founder: A.K Mansoor
- Headquarters: Dubai, United Arab Emirates
- Number of locations: 475 (2026)
- Area served: Worldwide
- Products: Fried chicken; Biryani; Chicken sandwiches; Wraps; French fries; Soft drinks; Salads; Desserts; Breakfast; Krushers (Milkshakes)
- Number of employees: 2500+
- Parent: BFI Management
- Website: www.chickingglobal.com www.chickingindia.in www.chickingusa.com www.chickingmaldives.com

ChicKing is an Indian-Arabian fast food restaurant chain that serves foods headquartered in Dubai, United Arab Emirates. ChicKing specializes in fried chicken. It was founded by A. K. Mansoor in 2000 in Dubai, United Arab Emirates.

== International locations ==
ChicKing currently franchises in 43 nations around the world.

=== Africa ===
- Angola
- Democratic Republic of the Congo
- Djibouti
- Egypt
- Ethiopia
- Ivory Coast
- Kenya
- Malawi
- Mauritius
- Nigeria
- Réunion
- Seychelles
- Somalia
- South Africa
- South Sudan
- Tanzania
- Uganda
- Zambia

=== Americas ===
- Canada
- Guyana
- Suriname
- Trinidad and Tobago
- United States

=== Asia and Oceania ===
- Afghanistan
- Australia
- Bangladesh
- Fiji
- India
- Indonesia
- Jordan
- Malaysia
- Maldives
- Myanmar
- New Zealand
- Oman
- Qatar
- Saudi Arabia
- Sri Lanka
- Tajikistan
- Thailand
- United Arab Emirates
- Yemen

=== Europe ===
- Netherlands
- United Kingdom

== Partnerships ==
ChicKing was the food partner of Kerala Blasters in the 2019–20 season of the Indian Super League.
