= Kozhikode Beach =

Beach in Kerala, India

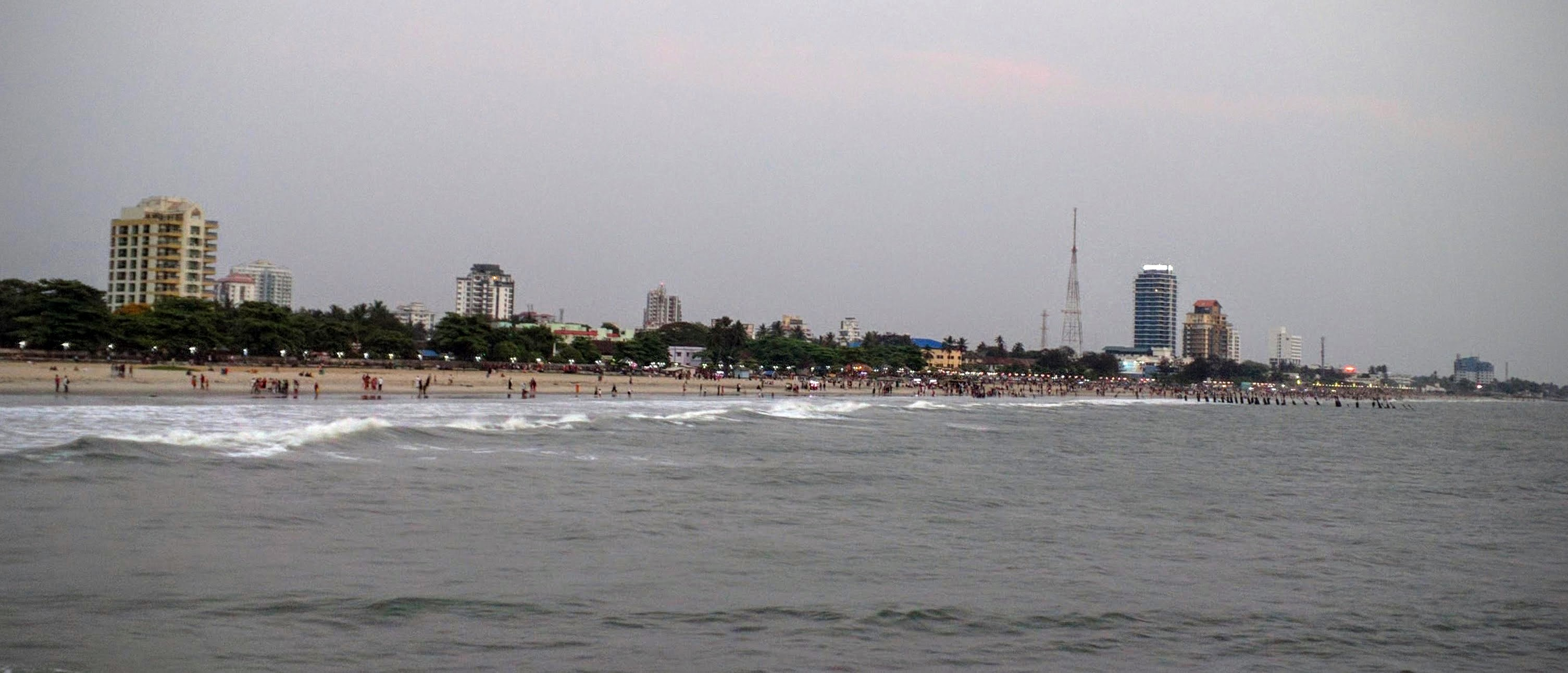
- Kozhikode Beach
- Interactive map of Kozhikode Beach
- Coordinates: 11.25607°N 75.76940°E
- Country: India
- State: Kerala

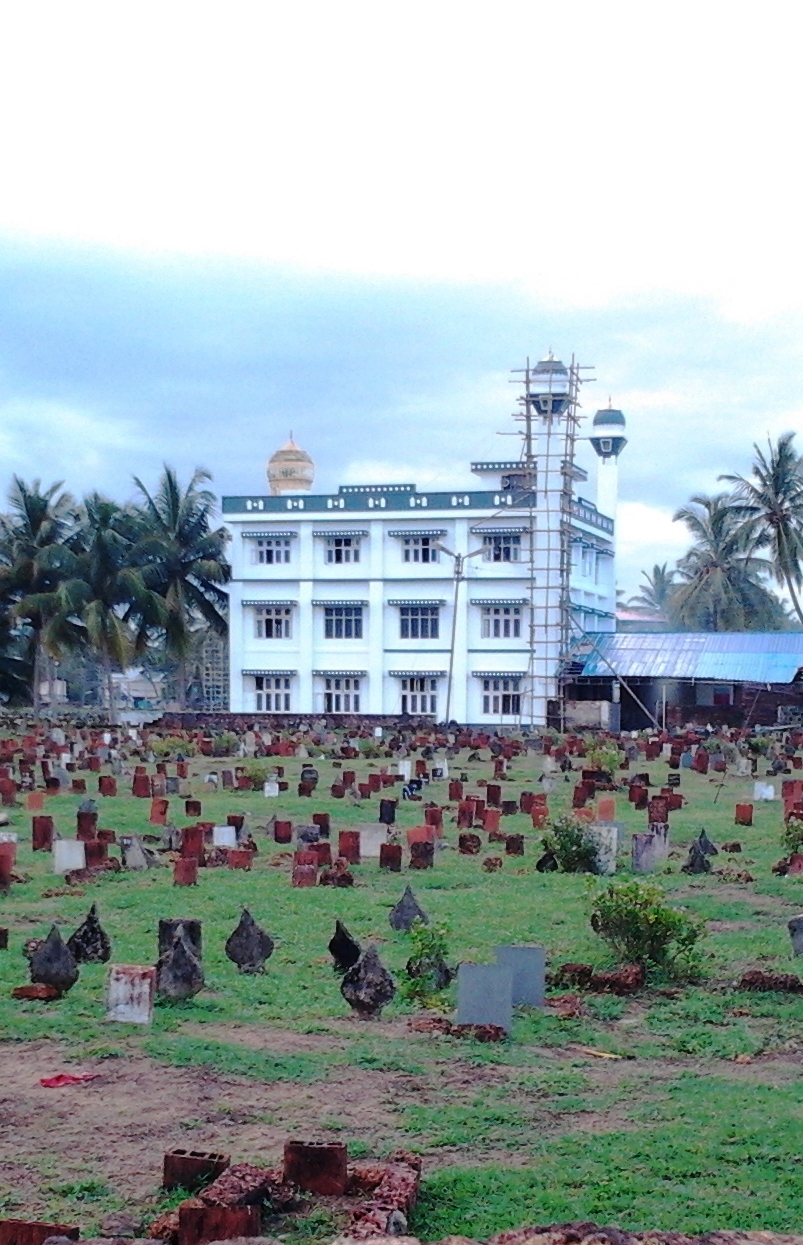
Kannam Parambu Mosque, South Beach

Kozhikode Beach is a beach on the western side of Kozhikode, situated on the Malabar Coast of India. The beach is accessible through four road overbridges in the city. The beach has paved stones and illumination. There is one Lions Park for the children and an aquarium. Kozhikode Beach has always been a prominent place for conducting public meetings. The beach road was renamed 'Gandhi Road' in 1934 after Gandhi visited Kozhikode in 1934.

In April 1950, land was acquired on the Kozhikode beach to build a Government Headquarters hospital.

== Rare phenomenon ==
In October 2025, the beach recorded a rare phenomenon as water receded along a 1.5-km stretch at the South beach for about 200 metres.

== Road ==
Kozhikode Beach has a long drive from Beypore in the south to Kappad in the north.

The following beaches are part of Kozhikode Beach:

- Beypore, Payyanakkal and Marad
- Kallayi, Kuttichira and Thekkeppuram
- Vellayil, South Beach and Valiyangadi
- Kamburam, Putiyappa and Elathur
- Konad, Bhat Road

== Image gallery ==
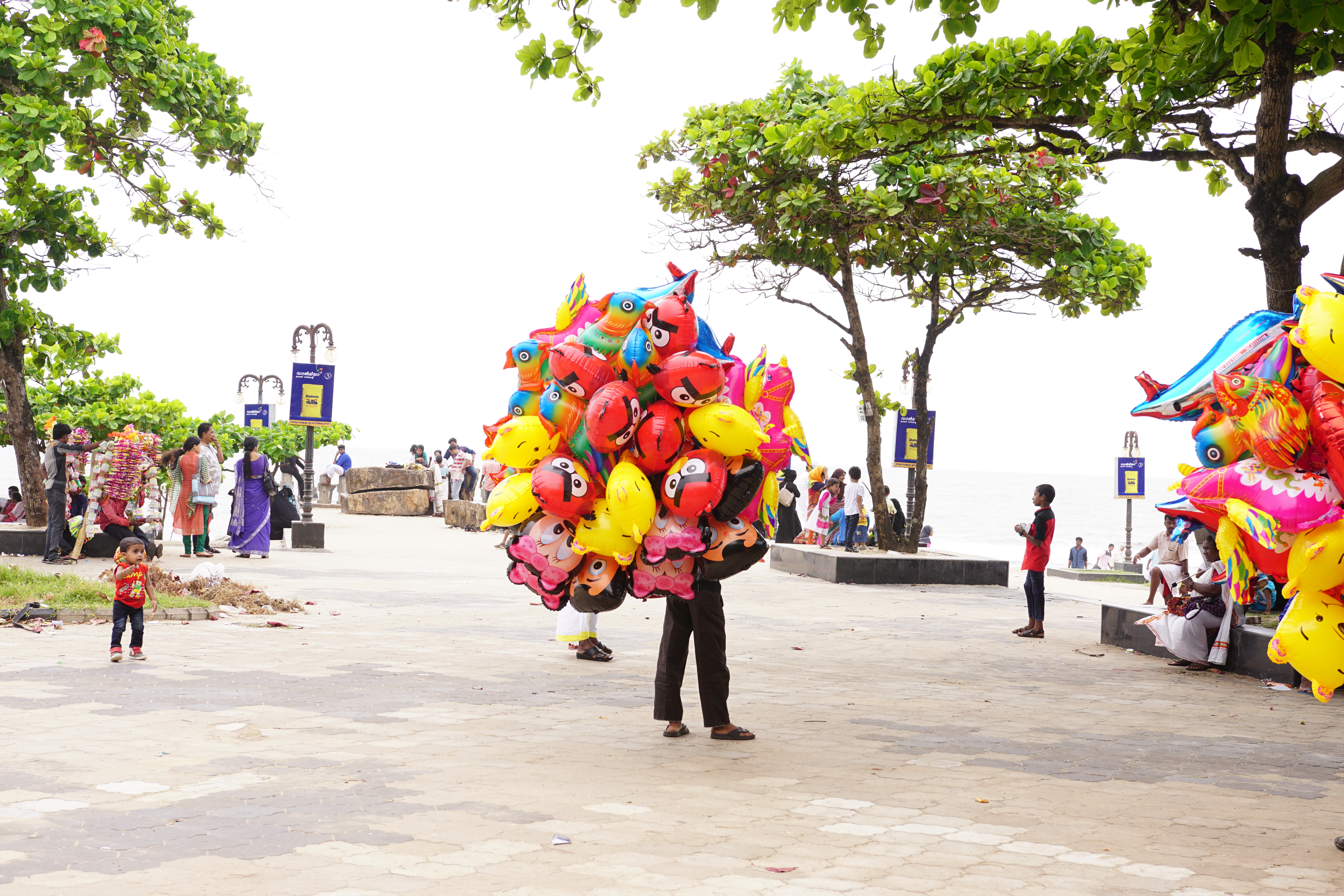
A view of the Calicut beach

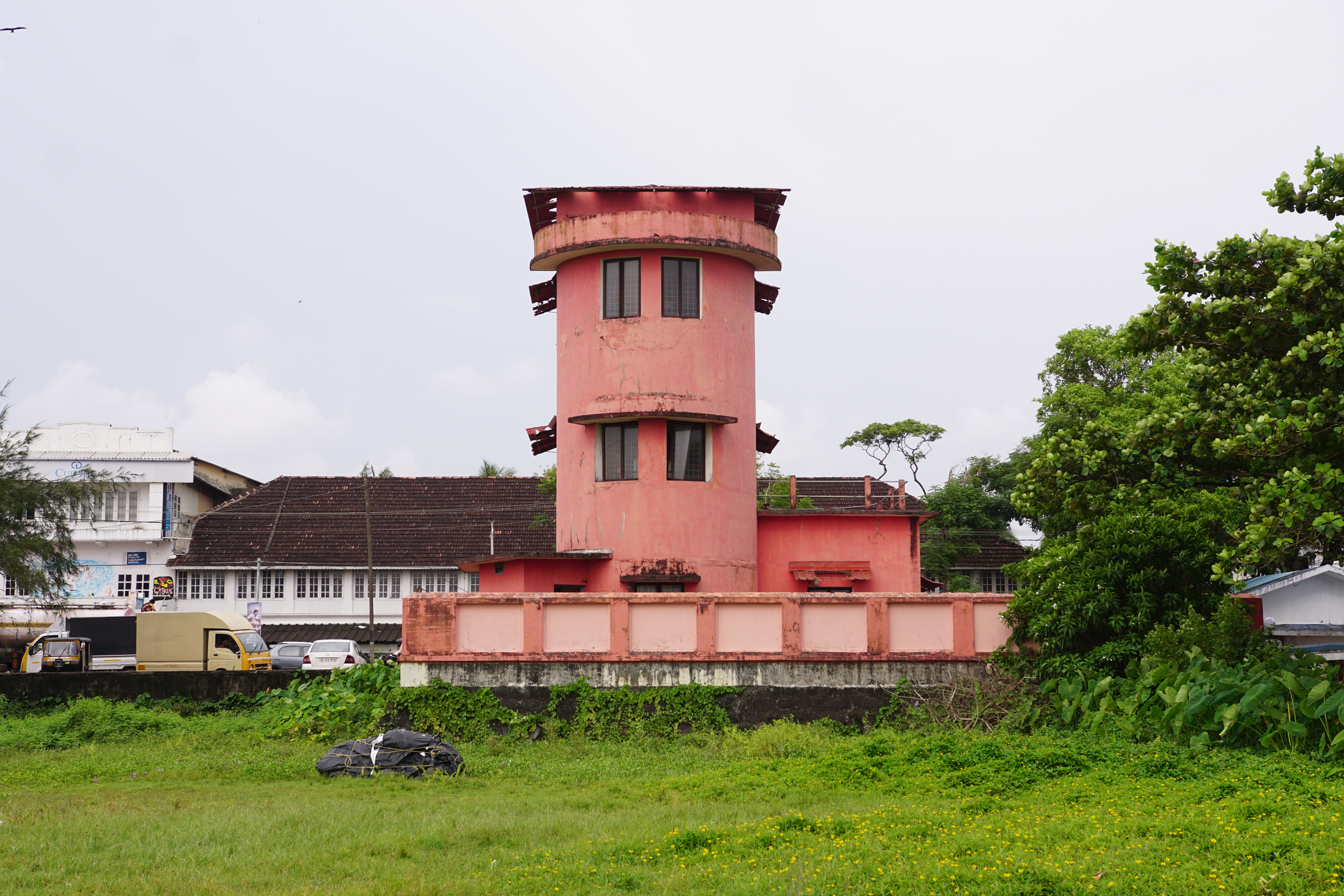
Kozhikode Beach
