= Economy of Kozhikode district =

Kozhikode is one of the main commercial cities of Kerala. The economy is mainly business oriented. The city currently is the major trade hub of North Kerala with good connectivity through road, rail and air. It also has large timber yards along the banks of the Kallayi River. Kozhikode District, with 8% of the state population, makes 12% contribution to the state's income. Nedungadi Bank, the first and oldest bank in the modern state of Kerala, was established by Appu Nedungadi at Kozhikode in the year 1899.

There has been a great leap in small-scale industries in Kozhikode district. Footwear industries have been flourishing in this city, and it has become a major non-leather footwear manufacturing hub in India.

== Building boom ==
Kozhikode has witnessed a building boom in recent years. This is particularly evident in the number of malls and buildings built in recent years. The KSRTC bus terminal is the biggest bus terminal in Kerala. Kerala's first and second tallest buildings are under construction in kozhikode. It is also famous for timber trade and roof tiles manufacturing centre.

== Ports ==
The District has an intermediate port at Kozhikode (including Beypore) and a minor port at Vatakara. In coast line of the Kozhikode port extends from Elathur cape to the south bank of Kadalundi river and treads roughly in straight line. This port has two Piers, but this cannot be used due to the dilapidated condition. Traffic is mainly dealt at Beypore port. Kozhikode Port has a Light House and a Signal Station. The godown at South Pier is used as transit sheds.

== Cyber parks ==
Two IT "cyber parks" are under construction in Kozhikode. One is the UL cyber park (constructed and operated by ULCCS, a Kozhikode-based company). UL cyber park began operation in 2012 and will complete its first phase in 2013. The other park is run by the government, and will complete its first construction phase in 2014. Cyberpark, is a Government of Kerala organisation planned to build, operate and manage IT parks for the promotion and development of investment in IT and ITES industries in Malabar region of Kerala and will be the third IT hub in the state of Kerala. The two IT park will create a total 100,000(100000) direct job opportunities. It is in the process of setting up IT parks at Kozhikode, at the SEZs approved at Kannur and Kasargod. Its first project is the development of Cyberpark hub in Kozhikode with its spokes at Kannur and Kazargode IT parks. Other planned projects include the Birla IT park (at Mavoor) and Malaysian satellite city (at Kinaloor) where KINFRA has plans to set up a 400-acre (1.6 km^{2}) industrial park.

== Shopping ==
The city has a strong mercantile aspect. The main area of business was once Valiyangadi (Big Bazaar) near the railway station. As time progressed, it shifted to other parts of the city. These days, the commercial heart has moved to Mittai Theruvu (Sweetmeat Street or S. M. Street), a long street crammed with shops that sell everything from saris to cosmetics. It also houses restaurants and sweetmeat shops. Today, the city has multiple shopping malls. Focus Mall (the first shopping mall in Kerala), HiLITE Mall (the second largest mall in Kerala) and RP Mall are a few among them. Currently, new shopping malls are springing up all over the city. This has changed the consumer habits, shifting the centre of commerce from S. M. Street to these places.

== Economy of Vadakara town ==
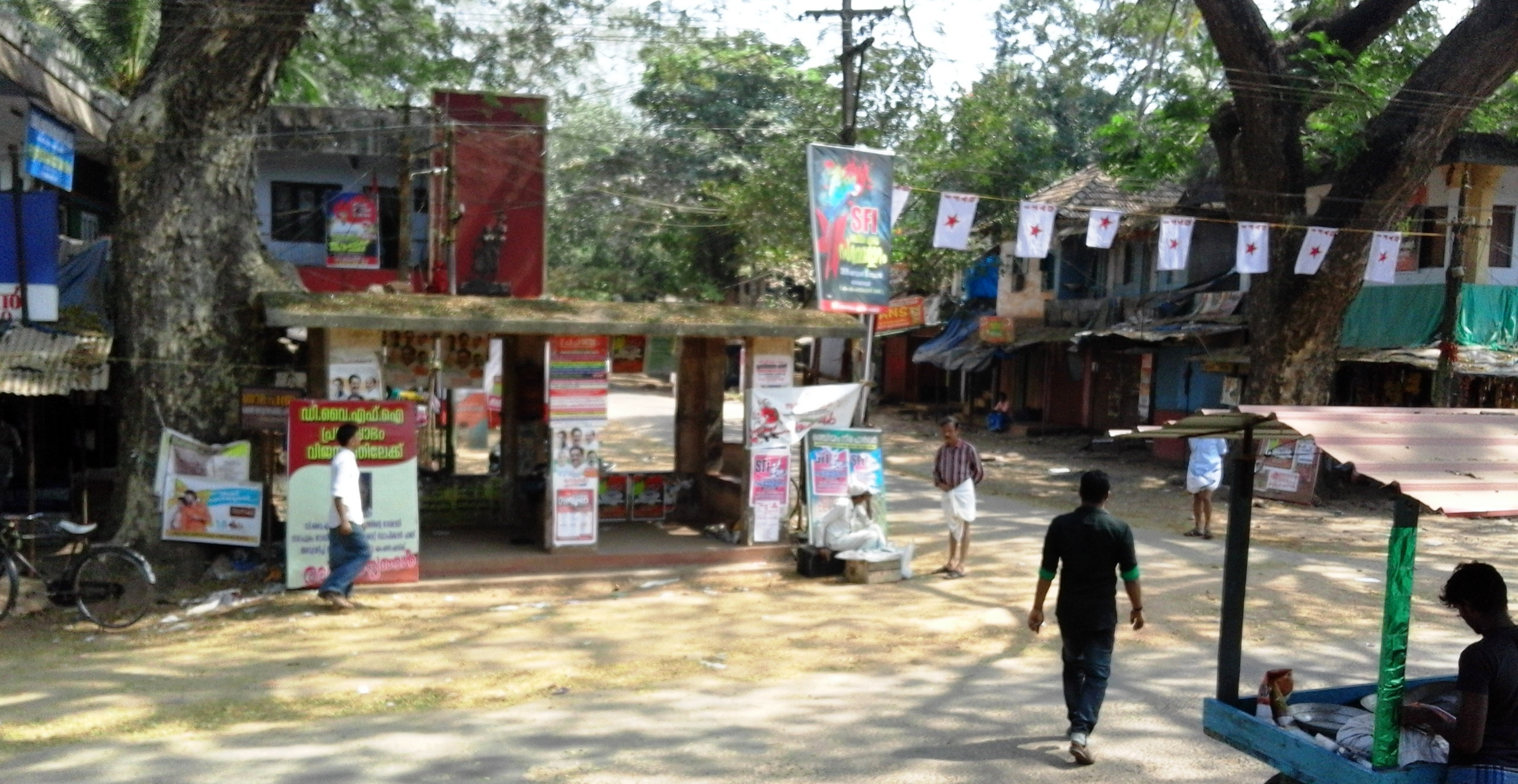
Madappally Junction.

Since Vadakara is a coastal town, fishing is one of the main commercial activities. The Moorad River flows into the Arabian Sea at a point close to the town. Sand Banks, a sunset spot and a place of tourist interest, are located at the river mouth. Vadakara mainly consists of 2 commercial hubs. The first hub is; centering the old bus stand with commercial establishments as old as hundred years. Recently the trend has shifted to the new bus stand area and the road towards Kannur. Many new establishments, including hospitals and flats are on the rise along the Nut street to PT Road highway junction, are planned over the coming years which will be the next commercial hub . Nut Street is the largest market for coconut, areca nut etc. Produce flow to the collection outlets which are dried packed and transported to other states. as northern kerala is well known for the production of coconut, the nut street is always busy! Hospitals include CO-OP Hospital, Asha Hospital, Janatha Hospital, Ceeyam Hospital and a new specialty hospital (Parco) at the PT road junction. Uralungal Labour Contract Co-operative Society is a unique labor cooperative initiative of Madappally area inspired by the Indian sage Vagbhatananda. The society was registered in 1925.
