= Hilite Mall =

Hilite Mall may refer to one of the following places in India:

- Hilite Mall Calicut, located in Kozhikode
- Hilite Mall Thrissur, located in Thrissur
