= Kozhikode =

Metropolis in Kerala, India

Kozhikode Kōḻikkōṭu (Malayalam) Calicut
- Metropolis
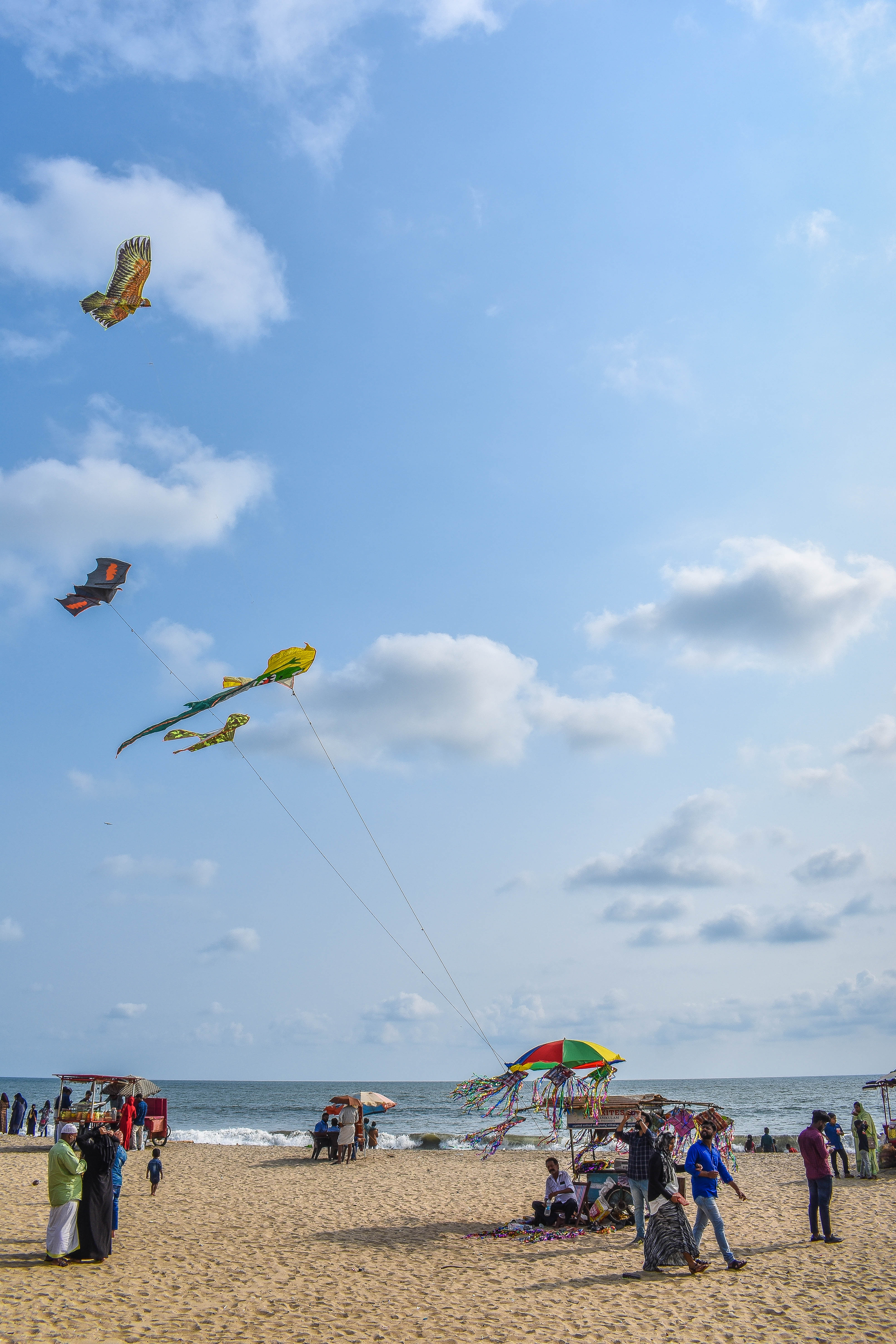
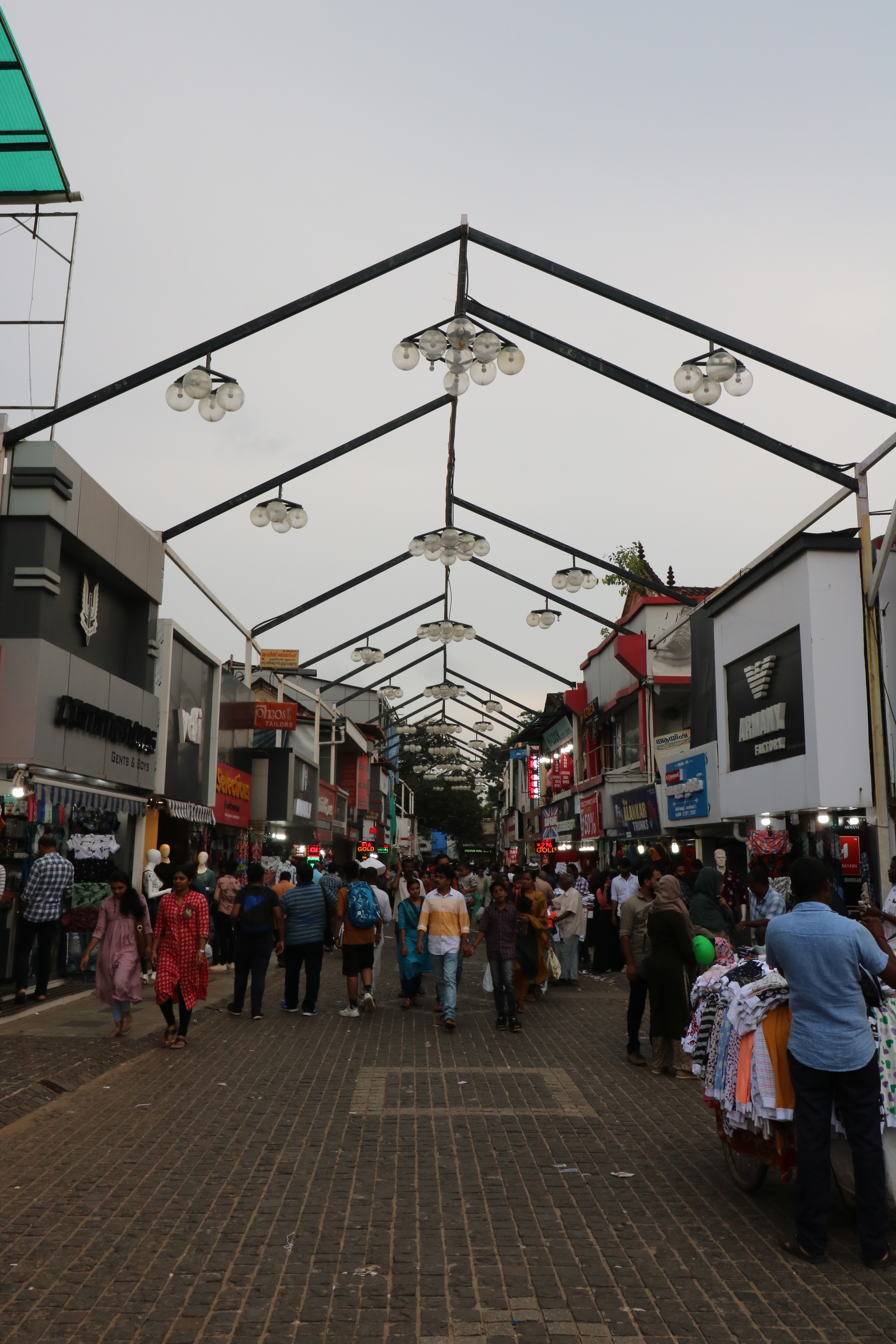
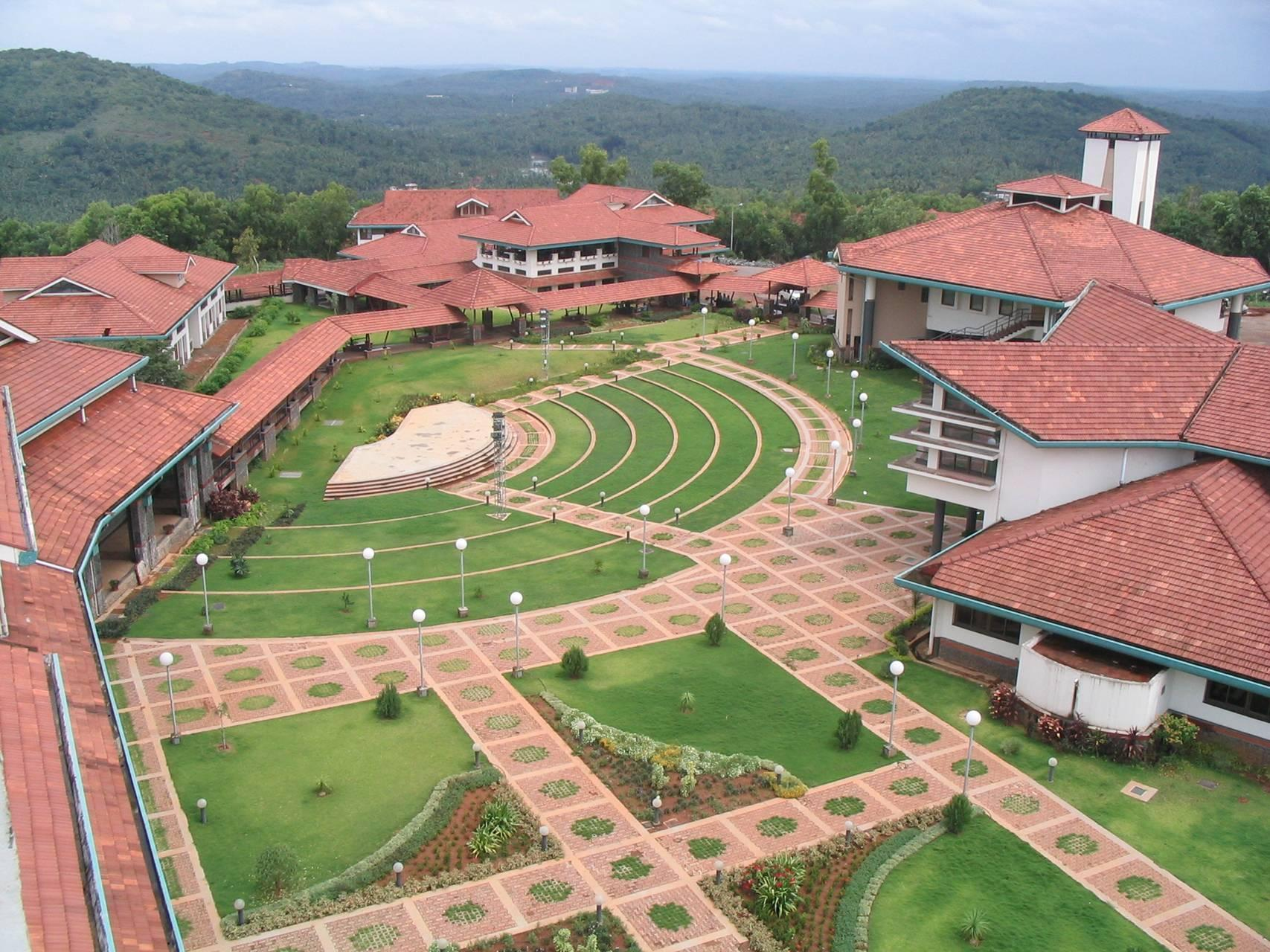
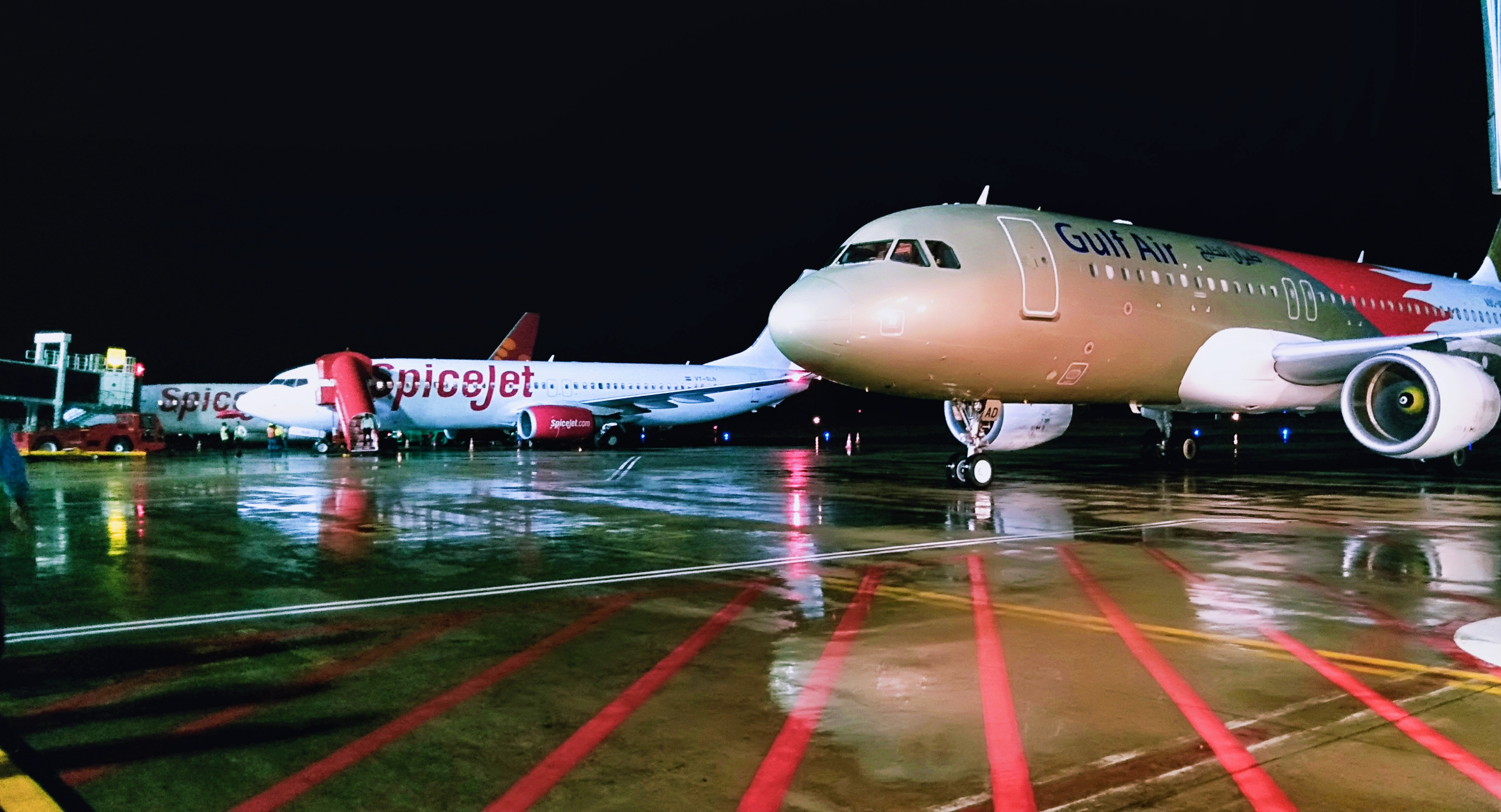
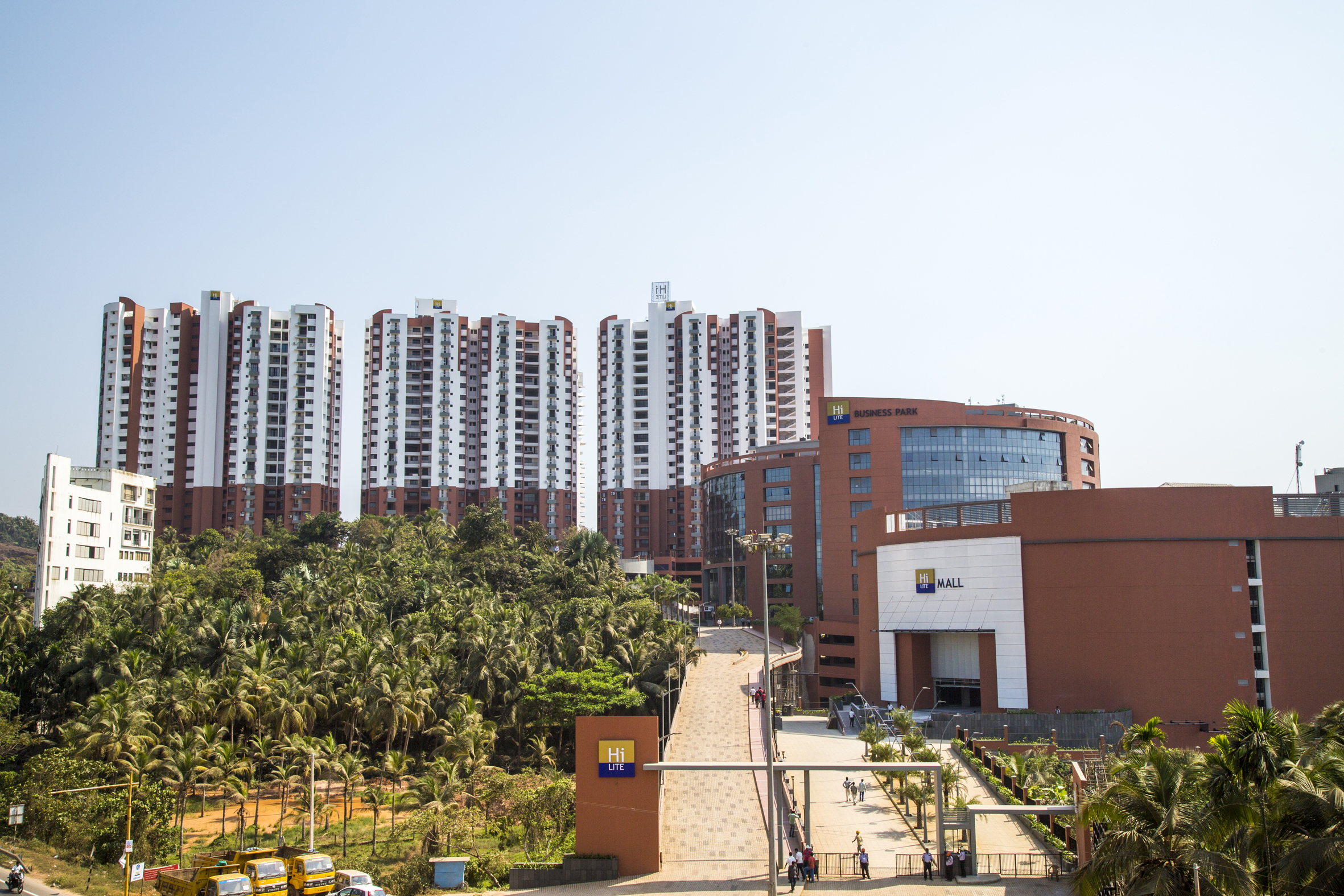
- From top: Kozhikode Beach, SM Street, IIM Kozhikode, Kozhikode International Airport, Hilite City
- Nicknames: City of Spices (Other nicknames include City of Truth, City of Sculptures, City of Literature)
- Kozhikode (Kerala) Kozhikode (India)
- Coordinates: 11°14′56″N 75°47′02″E
- State: Kerala
- District: Kozhikode

Government
  - Type: Municipal corporation
  - Body: Kozhikode Municipal Corporation
  - Mayor: O Sadashivan (CPIM)
  - Deputy mayor: Dr S Jayasree (CPIM)
  - Member of Parliament: M. K. Raghavan (INC)
  - DIG & Commissioner of Police: Narayanan T IPS

Area
  - Metropolis: 118.58 km^{2} (45.78 sq mi)
  - Metro: 518 km^{2} (200 sq mi)
- Elevation: 34.47 m (113.1 ft)

Population (2011)
  - Metropolis: 609,224
  - Density: 5,137.7/km^{2} (13,306/sq mi)
  - Metro: 4,387,000

Languages
  - Official: Malayalam, English
- Time zone: UTC+5:30 (IST)
- PIN: 673xxx
- Telephone code: +91495xxxxxxx, +91496xxxxxxx
- Vehicle registration: KL 11, KL 18, KL 56, KL 57, KL 76, KL 77, KL 85, KLD & KLZ (Historical)
- GDDP(2024): US$11 billion (INR 9630856 lakhs) in 2024
- Sex ratio: 1.093 ♀/♂
- Literacy rate: 96.8%
- International Airport: Calicut International Airport
- Website: kozhikodecorporation.lsgkerala.gov.in/en

Kozhikode (pronounced [koːɻikːoːɖɨ̆]), also known as Calicut, is a historic city along the Malabar Coast in the state of Kerala in India. The city is also known as the City of Spices. It was among the most important ports in the world during medieval times and have received visitors from Marco Polo to Ibn Batuta to Zheng He to Vasco da Gama.

It is the nineteenth-largest urban agglomeration in the country and the second-largest one in Kerala. Calicut city is the second-largest city proper in the state with a population of 609,224 within its municipal boundaries. Calicut is classified as a Tier-2 city by the Government of India.

It is the largest city on the Malabar Coast and was the capital of the British-era Malabar district. It was the capital of an independent kingdom ruled by the Samoothiris (Zamorins). The port at Kozhikode acted as the gateway to the medieval South Indian coast for the Chinese, the Persians, the Arabs, and finally the Europeans. In 2023, Kozhikode was recognised by UNESCO as India's first City of Literature.

== Etymology ==
The exact origin of the name Kozhikode is uncertain. According to many sources, the name Kozhikode is derived from Koyil-kota, meaning "fortified palace". Koil or Koyil or Kovil is the Malayalam/Tamil term for a Hindu temple. In the context of Kozhikide, it may refer to the Tali Shiva Temple. Both the terms kōyil and kōvil are used interchangeably. The Tamil name of the city is Kaḷḷikkōṭṭai.

The name evolved into Kolikod, or its Arabic form Qāliqūṭ (pronounced [qˠaːliqˠːuːtˤ]) and later its anglicised version Calicut. Chinese merchants called it Kūlifo.

The word calico, a fine hand-woven cotton fabric that was exported from the port of Kozhikode, is believed to be derived from Calicut.

== History ==
Names, routes and locations of the Periplus of the Erythraean Sea (1st century CE)

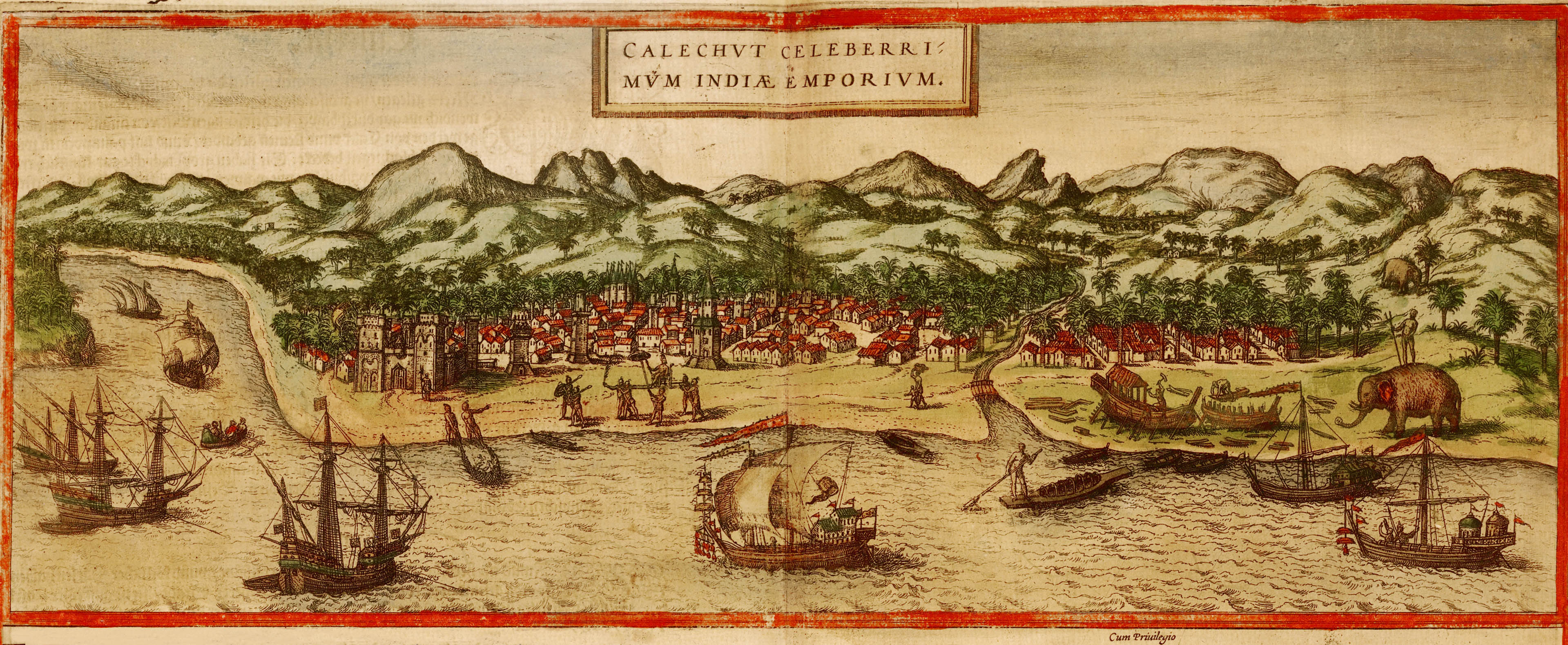
Painting of Kozhikode, India titled 'Calicut, the most famous trading center of India' from Georg Braun and Frans Hogenberg's atlas Civitates Orbis terrarum, 1572

The ancient port of Tyndis, located north of Muziris as mentioned in the Periplus of the Erythraean Sea, is believed to have been near Kozhikode. Its exact location is a matter of dispute. The suggested locations are Ponnani, Tanur, Beypore-Chaliyam-Kadalundi-Vallikkunnu, and Koyilandy. Tyndis was a major center of trade, second only to Muziris, between the Cheras and the Roman Empire. Pliny the Elder (1st century CE) states that the port of Tyndis was located at the northwestern border of Keprobotos (Chera dynasty). The North Malabar region, which lies north of the port at Tyndis, was ruled by the kingdom of Ezhimala during Sangam period. According to the Periplus of the Erythraean Sea, a region known as Limyrike began at Naura and Tyndis. However Ptolemy mentions only Tyndis as Limyrike's starting point. The region probably ended at Kanyakumari; it thus roughly corresponds to the present-day Malabar Coast. The value of Rome's annual trade with the region was estimated at around 50,000,000 sesterces. Pliny the Elder mentioned that Limyrike was prone to piracy. The Cosmas Indicopleustes mentioned that the Limyrike was a source of peppers.

In the 14th century, Kozhikode conquered large parts of central Kerala after the seizure of the Tirunavaya region from Valluvanad, which was under the control of the king of Perumbadappu Swaroopam (Cochin). The ruler of Perumpadappu was forced to shift his capital (c. CE 1405) further south from Kodungallur to Kochi. In the 15th century, the status of Cochin was reduced to a vassal state of Kozhikode, thus leading to the emergence of Kozhikode as the most powerful kingdom in medieval Malabar Coast. During the 15th century, Kalaripayattu played a significant role in Malabar's history. Notable warriors included Puthooram Veettil Aromal Chekavar and his sister Unniyarcha.

The port at Kozhikode held a superior economic and political position along the medieval Kerala coast, while Kannur, Kollam, and Kochi were commercially important secondary ports where traders from various parts of the world gathered. In the 15th century, Kozhikode was visited several times by ships from China, which became known as Ming treasure voyages.

Kozhikode was the capital of an independent kingdom ruled by the samoothiris (Zamorins) in the Middle Ages and later of the erstwhile Malabar District under British rule. Arab merchants traded with the region as early as 7th century, and Portuguese explorer Vasco da Gama landed at Kozhikode on 20 May 1498, opening a trade route between Europe and India. A Portuguese factory and a fort existed in Kozhikode for a short period (1511–1525, until the Fall of Calicut). The English landed in 1615 (constructing a trading post in 1665), followed by the French (1698) and the Dutch (1752). In 1765, Mysore captured Kozhikode as part of its occupation of the Malabar Coast.

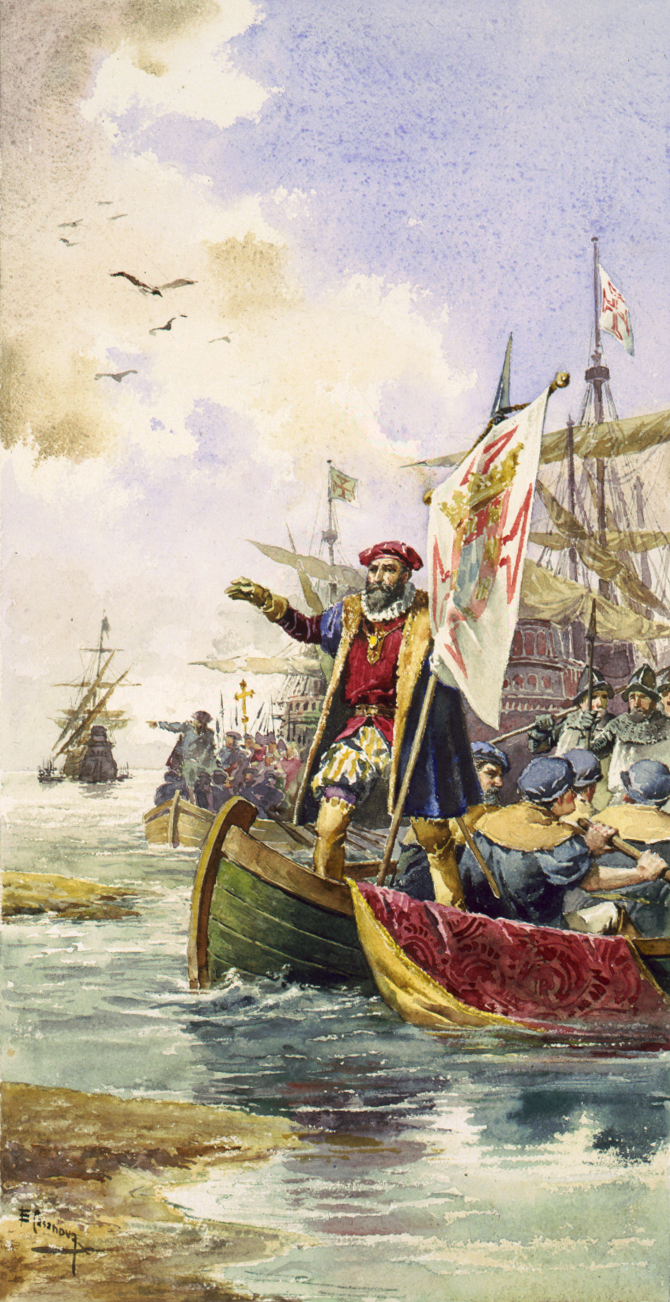
Vasco da Gama's arrival in Calicut in 1498 ushered in five centuries of rule of the Portuguese Empire in India, lasting until 1961.

=== Early Kozhikode in foreign accounts ===
Accounts of the city and the conditions prevailing then can be gleaned from the chronicles of travellers who visited the port city.

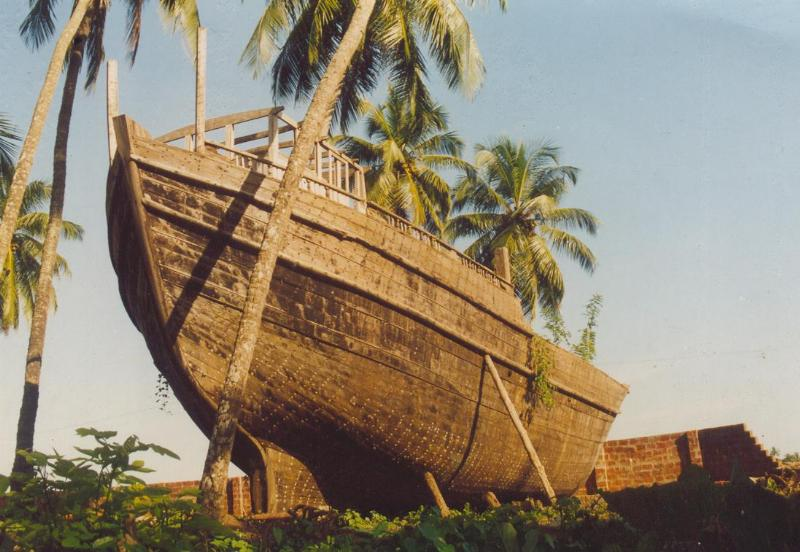
Uru, a type of ship that was historically used for maritime trade, built at Beypore, Kozhikode

Ibn Battuta (1342–1347), who visited six times, gives the earliest glimpses of life in the city. He describes Kozhikode as "one of the great ports of the district of Malabar" where "merchants of all parts of the world are found here". The king of this place, he says, "is an infidel, who shaves his chin just as the Haidari Fakeers of Room do... The greater part of the Muslim merchants of this place are so wealthy that one of them can purchase the whole freightage of such vessels put here and fit out others like them".

Ma Huan (1403), a Chinese sailor who was part of the Imperial Chinese fleet under Cheng Ho (Zheng He) lauds the city as a great emporium of trade frequented by merchants from around the world. He makes note of the 20 or 30 mosques built to cater to the religious needs of the Muslims, the unique system of calculation by the merchants using their fingers and toes (followed to this day) and the matrilineal system of succession.

Abdur Razzak (1442–1443), the ambassador of Persian Emperor Shah Rukh found the city's harbour perfectly secured and notices precious articles from several maritime countries, especially from Abyssinia, Zirbad and Zanzibar.

The Italian Niccolò de' Conti (1445), one of the earliest known Christian travellers to document Kozhikode, describes the city as abounding in pepper, lac, ginger, a larger kind of cinnamon, myrobalans and zedoary. He calls it a noble emporium for all India, with a circumference of 13 km (8 miles).

The Russian traveller Athanasius Nikitin or Afanasy Nikitin (1468–1474) calls 'Calecut' a port for the whole Indian sea and describes it as having a "big bazaar."

Other travellers who visited Kozhikode include the Italian Ludovico di Varthema (1503–1508) and Duarte Barbosa.

=== Zamorins of Calicut ===
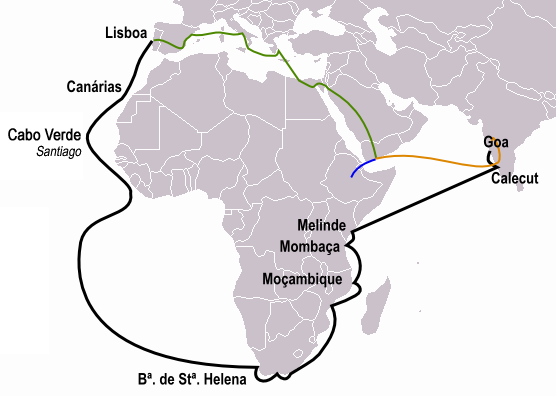
The path Vasco da Gama took to reach Kozhikode (black line) in 1498, which was also the discovery of a sea route from Europe to India, and eventually paved way for the European colonisation of Indian subcontinent.

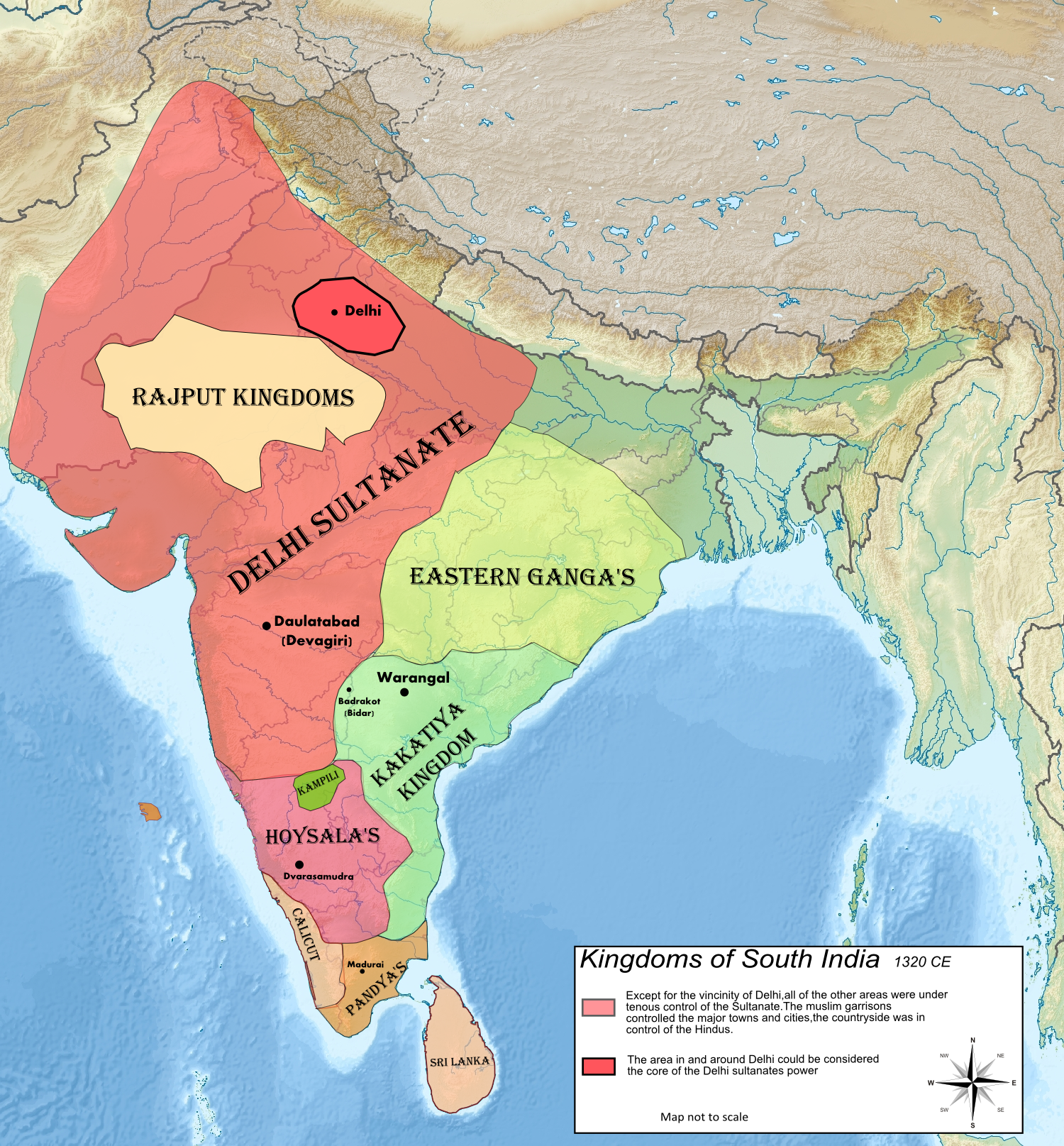
India in early 1320 CE. Most of the parts of present-day state of Kerala was under the influence of the Zamorin of Kozhikode.

Kozhikode and its suburbs formed part of the Polanad kingdom, a vassal state of the Kolathunadu of North Malabar, ruled by the Porlathiri. The Eradis of Nediyiruppu, based in Kondotty (Eranad, Malappuram district), wanted an outlet to the sea to initiate trade and commerce with distant lands. After a prolonged conflict with the Polathiri lasting 48 years, they conquered the area around Panniankara. Following this, Menokki became the ruler of Polanad and came to terms with the local troops and people.

Subsequently, the town of Kozhikode was founded close to the palace at Tali. The Eradis then shifted their headquarters from Nediyiruppu to Kozhikode. The Governor of Ernad built a fort at Velapuram to safeguard their new territory. The fort most likely lent its name to Koyil Kotta, the precursor to Kozhikode. The city thus came into existence sometime in the 13th century.

As the status of the Udaiyavar (king) increased, he became known as Swami Nambiyathiri Thirumulpad, eventually assuming the title Samuri or Samoothiri. European traders referred to this title in a corrupted form as Zamorin.

At the peak of their power, the Zamorins ruled over a region from Kollam (Quilon) to Panthalayini Kollam (Koyilandy). Following the discovery of the sea route from Europe to Kozhikode in 1498, the Portuguese began to expand their territories and ruled the seas between Ormus and the Malabar Coast, and as far south as Ceylon. Some prominent Jenmis in Kozhikode were engaged in sea trade and shipping as early as two centuries ago.

According to historian K. V. Krishna Iyer, Kozhikode's rise was both a cause and a consequence of Zamorin's ascendancy in Kerala. By the late 15th century, the Zamorin was at the zenith of his power, with all princes and chieftains of Kerala north of Kochi acknowledging his suzerainty. The Sweetmeat Street (Mittayi Theruvu) was an important trading street under Zamorin's rule.

The First Battle of Cannanore in January 1502, fought between the Third Portuguese Armada allied with the Kingdom of Cochin under João da Nova and Zamorin of Calicut's navy, marked the beginning of Portuguese conflicts in the Indian Ocean. The defeat of the joint fleet of the Sultan of Gujarat Mahmud Begada, the Mamlûk Burji Sultanate of Egypt, and the Zamorin of Calicut with support from the Republic of Venice and the Ottoman Empire in the Battle of Diu in February 1509 marked the beginning of Portuguese dominance over the spice trade and the Indian Ocean.

Throughout the 16th century, continuous naval conflicts between the Zamorin's navy, led by Kunjali Marakkar (Fleet Admiral) and the Portuguese significantly reduced the importance of Kozhikode as a centre of trade. Kunjali Marakkar is credited with organizing the first naval defense of the Indian coast.

By the early 17th century, the Zamorin expelled the Portuguese with the help of the Dutch East India Company. In 1602, the Zamorin sent envoys to Aceh, promising the Dutch a fort at Kozhikode in exchange for their support in trade. Two factors, Hans de Wolff and Lafer, were sent from Aceh, but the two were captured by the chief of Tanur, and handed over to the Portuguese.

In November 1604, a Dutch fleet under Admiral Steven van der Hagen arrived in Kozhikode, marking the beginning of the Dutch presence in Kerala. On 11 November 1604, the Dutch East India Company signed its first treaty with an Indian ruler, forming an alliance with Kozhikode to expel the Portuguese from Malabar. In return, the Dutch were granted trading rights in Kozhikode and Ponnani, including spacious storehouses. By this time, however, the kingdom and port of Kozhikode had lost much of their former prominence.

=== British Rule ===
The arrival of the English in Kerala is documented in the year 1615, when a group under the leadership of Captain William Keeling arrived at Kozhikode, aboard three ships. It was in these ships that Sir Thomas Roe went to visit Jahangir, the fourth Mughal emperor, as an English envoy. In 1755, Travancore became the most dominant state in Kerala by defeating the Zamorin of Kozhikode in the battle of Purakkad. In the late 18th century, Kozhikode came under British rule after the Mysorean conquest of Malabar. The British later formed the Thiyyar Regiment to fulfill their military commitments in Malabar.

Kozhikode was the administrative capital of the Malabar District, one of the two districts on the western coast (Malabar Coast) of the Madras presidency. During British rule, Malabar's importance lay in the production of pepper, coconut, tiles, and teak. Kozhikode municipality was formed on 1 November 1866 according to the Madras Act 10 of 1865 (Amendment of the Improvements in Towns act 1850).

=== Post-Independence ===
Kozhikode Municipality was upgraded into Kozhikode Municipal Corporation in 1962, making it the second-oldest Municipal Corporation in the state.

== Climate ==
Kozhikode has a tropical monsoon climate (Köppen climate classification Am). A brief spell of pre-monsoon mango showers occurs in April. The primary source of rainfall is the southwest monsoon which begins in early June and lasts until September. The city also receives significant precipitation from the northeast monsoon, which begins in mid-October and continues through November. Winters (December–February) are warmer than summers (June–August), with spring (March–May) being the hottest season.

Climate data for Kozhikode (1991–2020, extremes 1901–2020)
Month	Jan	Feb	Mar	Apr	May	Jun	Jul	Aug	Sep	Oct	Nov	Dec	Year
Record high °C (°F)	36.5 (97.7)	37.6 (99.7)	38.6 (101.5)	39.1 (102.4)	39.2 (102.6)	36.2 (97.2)	35.7 (96.3)	35.1 (95.2)	35.7 (96.3)	36.2 (97.2)	36.8 (98.2)	37.0 (98.6)	39.2 (102.6)
Mean daily maximum °C (°F)	33.0 (91.4)	33.5 (92.3)	34.2 (93.6)	34.4 (93.9)	33.7 (92.7)	30.6 (87.1)	29.6 (85.3)	29.8 (85.6)	30.9 (87.6)	31.8 (89.2)	32.6 (90.7)	32.9 (91.2)	32.3 (90.1)
Daily mean °C (°F)	28.0 (82.4)	28.8 (83.8)	30.0 (86.0)	30.5 (86.9)	30.0 (86.0)	27.5 (81.5)	26.7 (80.1)	26.9 (80.4)	27.6 (81.7)	28.1 (82.6)	28.4 (83.1)	28.1 (82.6)	28.4 (83.1)
Mean daily minimum °C (°F)	23.1 (73.6)	24.1 (75.4)	25.7 (78.3)	26.5 (79.7)	26.3 (79.3)	24.4 (75.9)	23.8 (74.8)	24.0 (75.2)	24.3 (75.7)	24.4 (75.9)	24.3 (75.7)	23.2 (73.8)	24.5 (76.1)
Record low °C (°F)	17.6 (63.7)	16.1 (61.0)	19.4 (66.9)	21.0 (69.8)	20.0 (68.0)	20.6 (69.1)	20.5 (68.9)	20.6 (69.1)	21.1 (70.0)	18.6 (65.5)	16.1 (61.0)	16.1 (61.0)	16.1 (61.0)
Average rainfall mm (inches)	1.6 (0.06)	4.8 (0.19)	14.6 (0.57)	83.5 (3.29)	223.5 (8.80)	782.9 (30.82)	750.0 (29.53)	432.6 (17.03)	273.3 (10.76)	302.6 (11.91)	120.4 (4.74)	21.9 (0.86)	3,011.9 (118.58)
Average rainy days	0.1	0.3	1.0	4.1	9.0	23.1	24.3	19.1	12.3	11.6	6.0	1.5	112.3
Average relative humidity (%) (at 17:30 IST)	64	65	68	70	74	84	87	85	81	78	73	66	75
Source 1: India Meteorological Department
Source 2: Tokyo Climate Center (mean temperatures 1991–2020)

Climate data for Kozhikode International Airport (1991–2020, extremes–2020)
Month	Jan	Feb	Mar	Apr	May	Jun	Jul	Aug	Sep	Oct	Nov	Dec	Year
Record high °C (°F)	36.1 (97.0)	37.8 (100.0)	37.7 (99.9)	38.6 (101.5)	36.8 (98.2)	35.4 (95.7)	35.7 (96.3)	32.6 (90.7)	32.2 (90.0)	33.6 (92.5)	35.0 (95.0)	35.0 (95.0)	38.6 (101.5)
Mean daily maximum °C (°F)	32.9 (91.2)	33.6 (92.5)	34.0 (93.2)	34.0 (93.2)	32.9 (91.2)	30.0 (86.0)	29.0 (84.2)	29.2 (84.6)	30.2 (86.4)	30.9 (87.6)	31.9 (89.4)	32.4 (90.3)	31.8 (89.2)
Mean daily minimum °C (°F)	22.1 (71.8)	23.0 (73.4)	24.7 (76.5)	25.4 (77.7)	25.1 (77.2)	23.4 (74.1)	22.9 (73.2)	23.1 (73.6)	23.3 (73.9)	23.3 (73.9)	23.2 (73.8)	22.4 (72.3)	23.5 (74.3)
Record low °C (°F)	11.2 (52.2)	19.9 (67.8)	21.4 (70.5)	19.8 (67.6)	20.8 (69.4)	20.2 (68.4)	19.3 (66.7)	19.6 (67.3)	20.6 (69.1)	20.1 (68.2)	19.5 (67.1)	19.3 (66.7)	11.2 (52.2)
Average rainfall mm (inches)	3.0 (0.12)	3.8 (0.15)	26.6 (1.05)	84.7 (3.33)	198.3 (7.81)	706.6 (27.82)	689.4 (27.14)	428.2 (16.86)	295.5 (11.63)	321.8 (12.67)	134.4 (5.29)	35.3 (1.39)	2,927.5 (115.26)
Average rainy days	0.2	0.4	1.2	4.2	8.8	22.2	23.6	18.8	13.4	12.6	6.6	1.4	113.4
Average relative humidity (%) (at 17:30 IST)	57	56	61	66	70	81	82	81	77	78	73	62	70
Source: India Meteorological Department

== Demographics ==
Religions in Kozhikode city (2011)
Religion	Percent
Hinduism	57.37%
Islam	37.66%
Christianity	4.60%
Other or not stated	0.37%

The total population within the Kozhikode Municipal Corporation limits is 550,440. Males account for 47.7% of the population, while females make up 52.3%.

Kozhikode has been a multi-ethnic and multi-religious town since the early medieval period. The Hindus form the largest religious group, followed by Muslims and Christians. Hindus form the majority at 57.37%(315,807 people), while Muslims form 37.66% (207,298 people).

Kozhikode Municipal Corporation has an average literacy rate of 96.8% (national average is 74.85%). The male literacy rate is 97.93% and female literacy rate is 95.78%.

Historically, Kozhikode has been home to diverse communities and regional groups. Many of these communities continued their traditional occupations and customs until the 20th century. Brahmins primarily resided near Hindu temples in the city. Regional groups such as Tamil Brahmins, Gujaratis, and Marwari Jains settled in the city, residing near their shrines.

The Nairs formed the rulers, warriors and landed gentry of Kozhikode. The Samoothiri had a ten thousand strong Nair bodyguard called the Kozhikkottu pathinaayiram (The 10,000 of Kozhikode) who defended the capital and supported the administration within the city. He had a larger force of 30,000 Nairs in his capacity as the Prince of Eranadu, called the Kozhikkottu Muppatinaayiram (The 30,000 of Kozhikode). The Nairs also formed the members of the suicide squad (chaver). The Thiyyar formed the vaidyars (Ayurveda Physicians), local militia, and traders of Kozhikode. The Muslims of Kozhikode are known as Mappilas, and according to the official Kozhikode website "the great majority of them are Sunnis following the Shafi school of thought. There are some smaller communities among the Muslims such as Dawoodi Bohras of Gujarati origin. Many of the Muslims living in the historic part of the city follow matrilineality and are noted for their piety. Though Christianity is believed to have been introduced in Kerala in the 1st century CE, the size of the community in Malabar (northern Kerala) began to rise only after the arrival of Portuguese missionaries towards the close of the 15th century. A few Christians of Thiruvitankoor and Kochi have lately migrated to the hilly regions of the district and are settled there.

The Tamil Brahmins are primarily settled around the Tali Siva temple. They arrived in Kozhikode as dependants of chieftains, working as cooks, cloth merchants and moneylenders. They have retained their Tamil language and dialects as well as caste rituals. The Gujarati community is settled mostly around the Jain temple in and around the Valliyangadi. They owned many establishments, especially textile and sweet shops. They must have arrived in Kozhikode at least from the beginning of the 14th century. They belong to either the Hindu or the Jain community. A few Marwari families are also found in Kozhikode who was basically moneylenders.

Languages of Kozhikode city (2011)
1. Malayalam (97.6%)
2. Tamil (0.91%)
3. Others (1.45%)

By language, 97.64% of the population speaks Malayalam and 0.91% Tamil as their first language.

== Civic administration ==
The city is administered by the Kozhikode Corporation, headed by a mayor. For administrative purposes, the city is divided into 75 wards, from which the members of the corporation council are elected for five years. Recently neighbouring suburbs Beypore, Elathur, Cheruvannur and Nallalam were merged within the municipal corporation.

Kozhikode Municipal Corporation
Mayor	O. Sadasivan (CPIM)
Deputy Mayor	S. Jayasree (CPIM)
Corporation Secretary	Bini K.U.
Police Commissioner	T Narayanan IPS

Kozhikode Corporation is the first City Corporation in Kerala after the creation of the state. Established in 1962, Kozhikode Corporation's first mayor was H Manjunatha Rao. Kozhikode corporation has four state assembly constituencies – Kozhikode North, Kozhikode South, Beypore and Elathur – all of which are part of Kozhikode Lok Sabha constituency.

The Town and Country Planning Department (TCPD) prepare development plan for the city.

The Kerala Water Authority manages the city's water supply, while the Kerala Fire and Rescue Services Department is responsible for fire protection and emergency services. The Kozhikode City Police maintains law and order, and the Kerala State Electricity Board provides electricity to the city. Public transport is operated mainly by the Kerala State Road Transport Corporation (KSRTC), along with private bus operators.

=== Kozhikode Municipal Corporation Election 2020 ===
S.No.	Party name	Party symbol	Number of Corporators
01	LDF		49
02	UDF		14
03	BJP		07
04	Independents		05

=== Law and order ===
The Kozhikode City Police is headed by a Police Commissioner, an Indian Police Service (IPS) officer. The city is divided into 3 sub-divisions and 2 traffic sub-divisions each under an assistant commissioner. Apart from regular law and order, the city police comprise the city traffic police, bomb squad, dog squad, fingerprint bureau, women's cell, juvenile wing, narcotics cell, riot force, armed reserve camps, district crime records bureau and a women's station. It operates 19 police stations functioning under the Home Department of Government of Kerala.

== Transport ==
=== Road ===
==== National highways ====
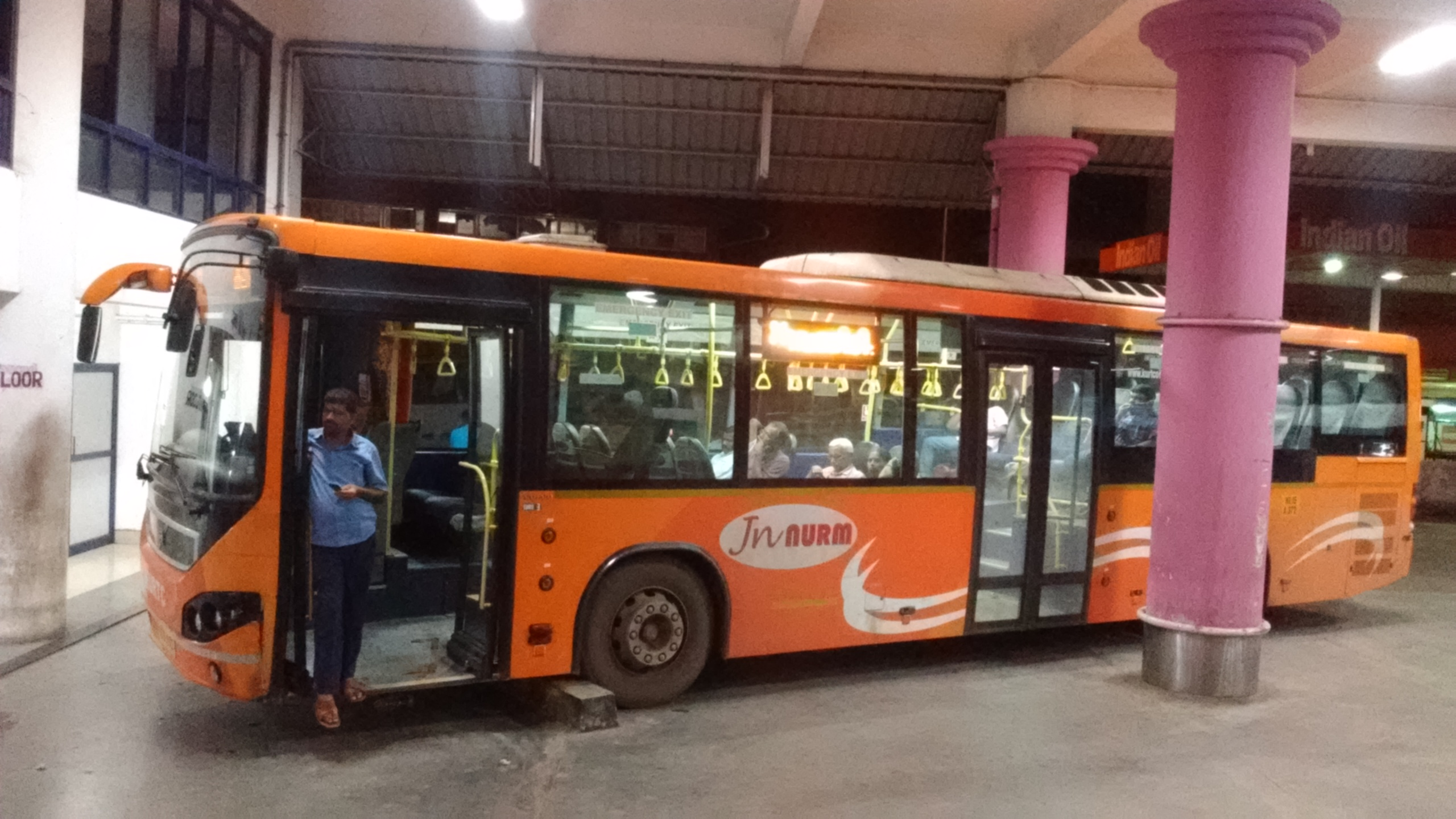
Volvo 8400 at Calicut Bus Terminal

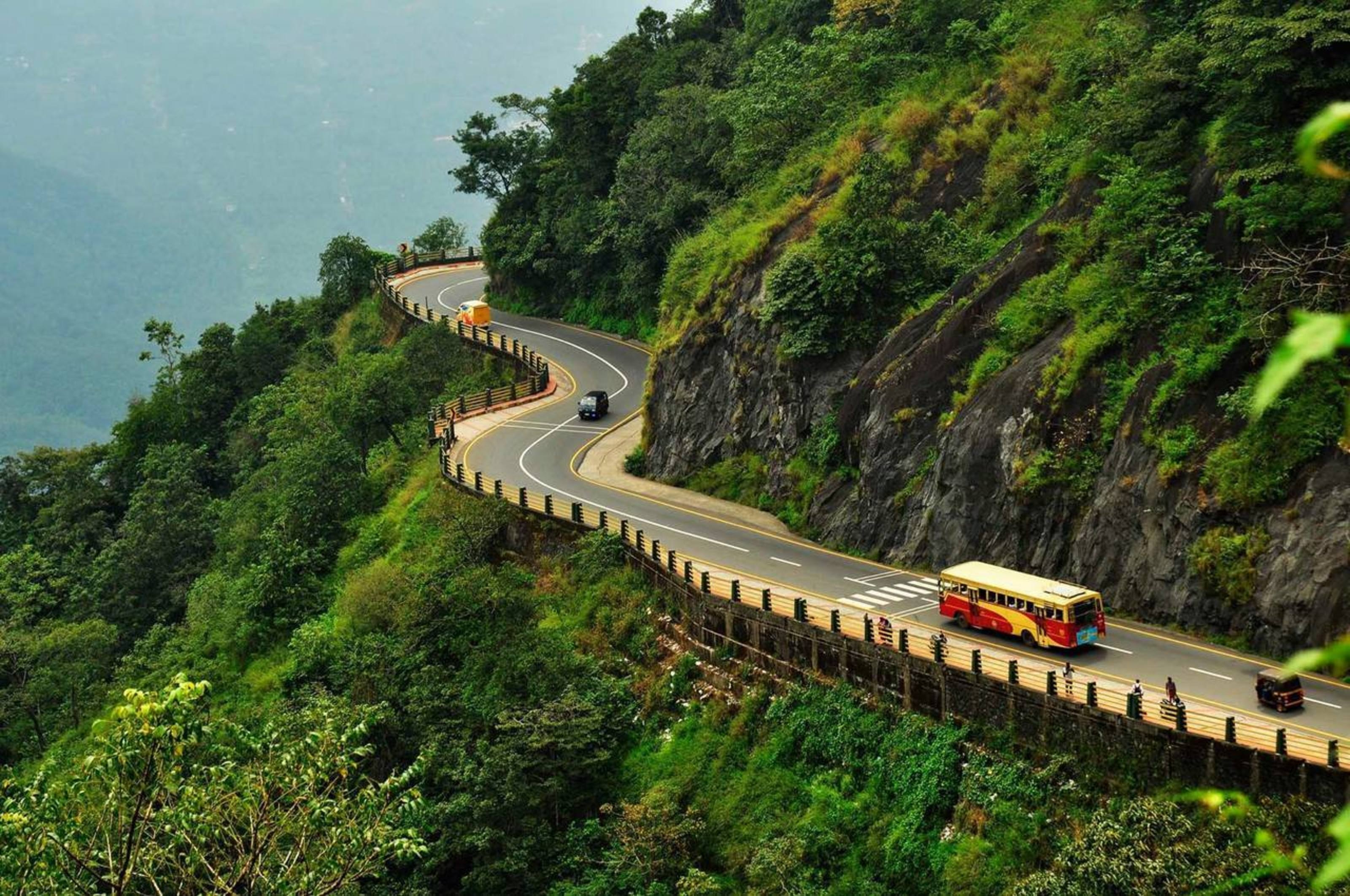
Thamarassery Churam is one of the popular tourist destinations in Kozhikode

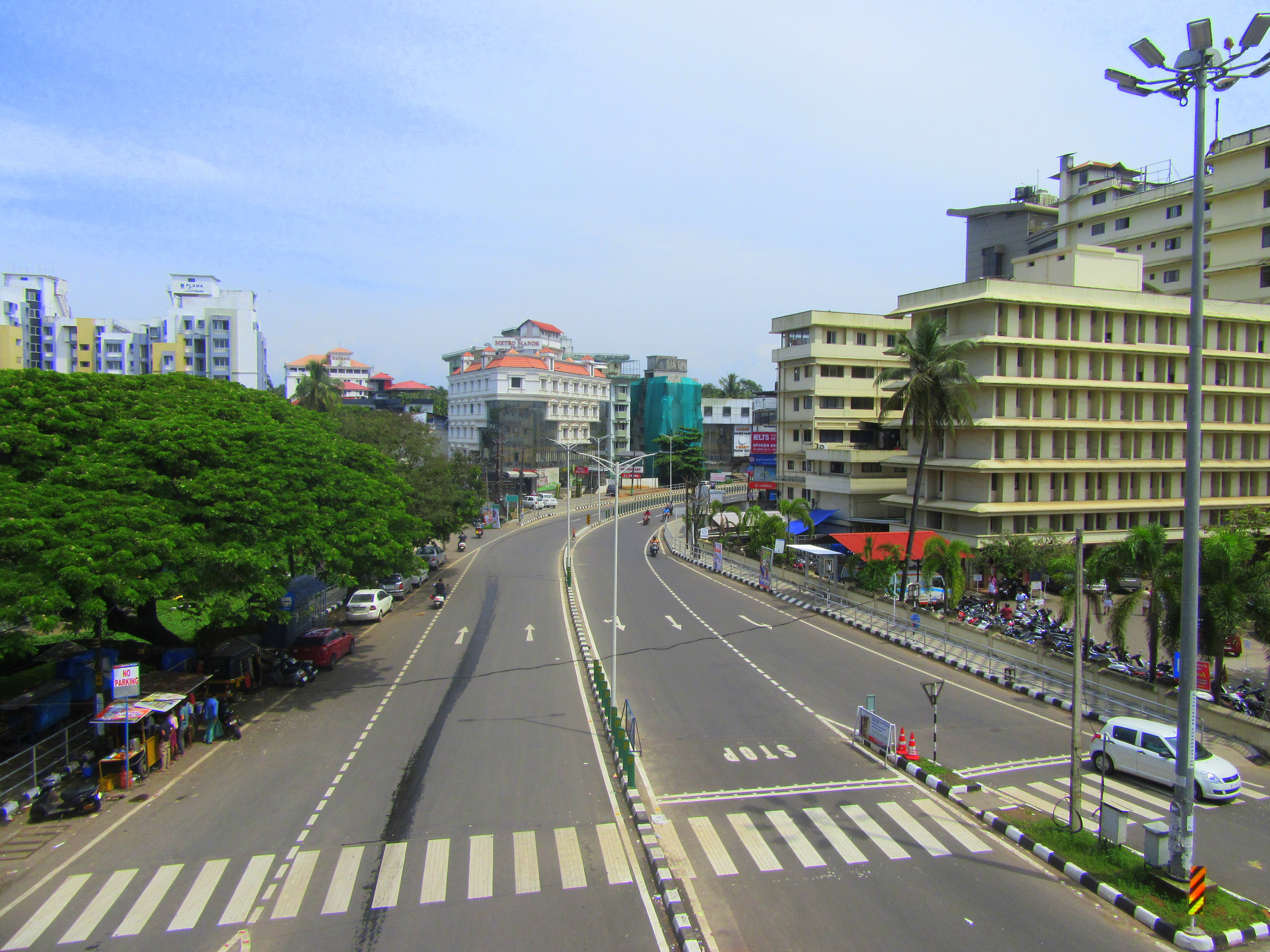
Calicut Mini Bypass

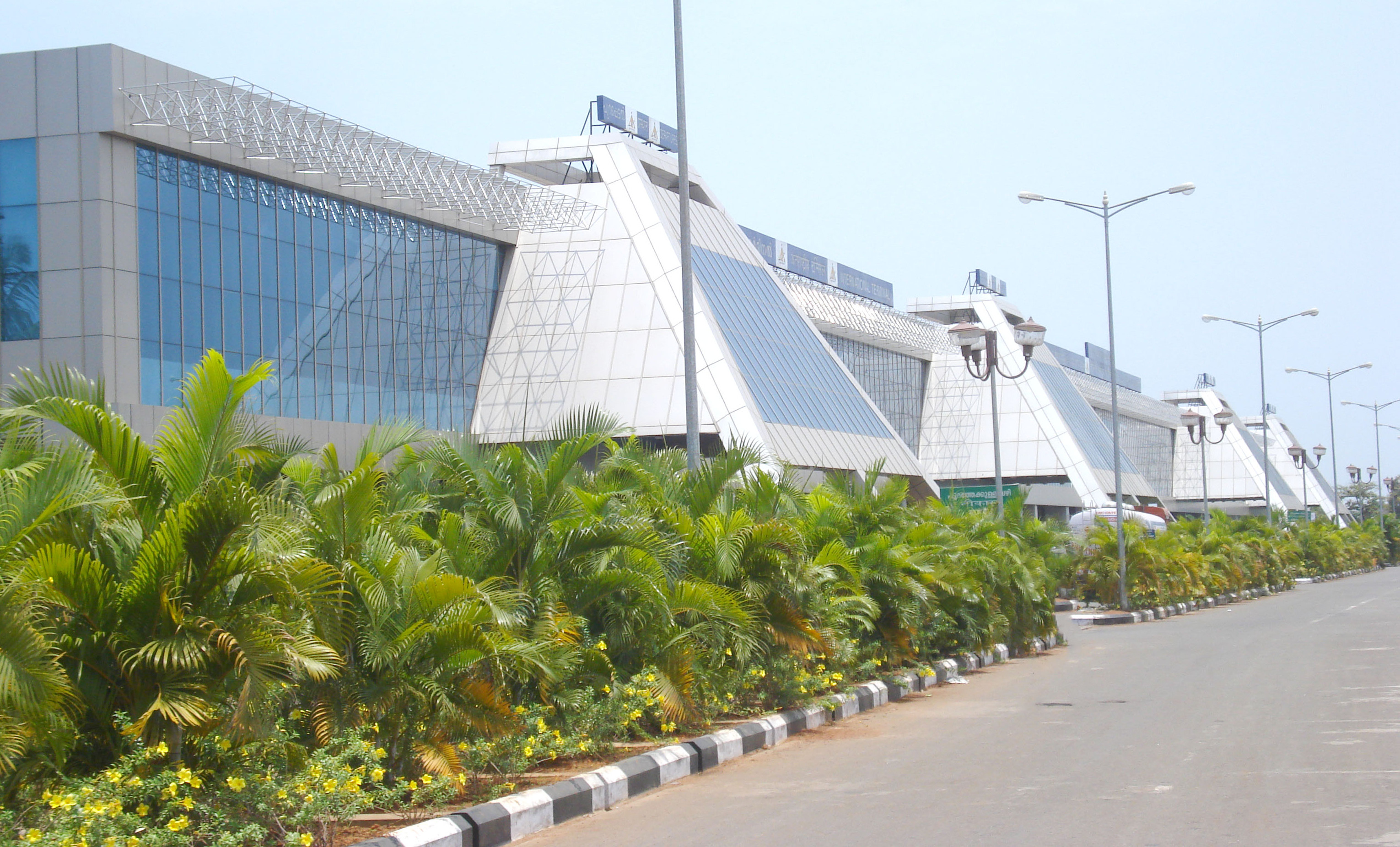
Calicut International Airport

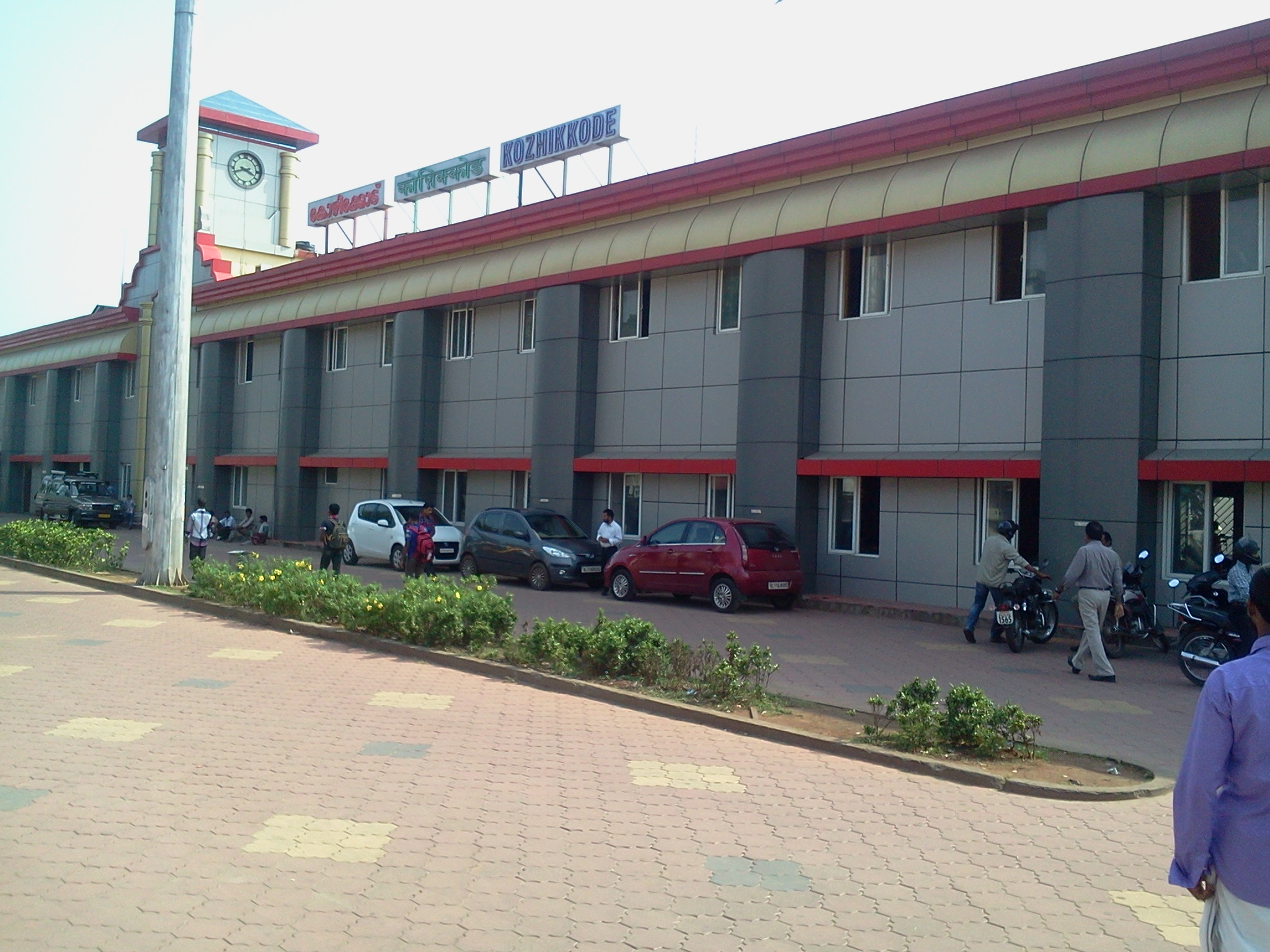
Kozhikode Railway Station is one of the busiest railway stations in South India

National Highway 66 connects Kozhikode to Mumbai via Mangaluru, Udupi and Goa to the north and Kochi and Kanyakumari near Thiruvananthapuram to the south along the west coast of India. This highway connects the city with the other important towns like, Kasaragod, Kanhangad, Kannur, Thalassery, Mahe, Vadakara, Koyilandy Ramanattukara, Kottakkal, Valanchery, Kuttippuram, Ponnani, Kodungallur, North Paravur, Ernakulam, Edapally and proceeds to Alappuzha, Thiruvananthapuram and terminates at the southern tip of India, Kanyakumari.

National Highway 766 connects Kozhikode to Bangalore through Kollegal in Karnataka via Tirumakudal Narsipur, Mysore, Nanjangud, Gundlupet, Sulthan Bathery, Kalpetta and Thamarassery.

National Highway 966 connects Kozhikode to Palakkad through Malappuram and Perinthalmanna. It covers a distance of 125 km (78 miles). At Ramanattukara, a suburb of Kozhikode, it joins NH 66. It passes through major towns like Kondotty, Perinthalmanna, and Mannarkkad and Malappuram. This stretch connects the city and Calicut International Airport.

==== State Highways ====
SH 29 passes through the city. It connects NH 766, Malabar Christian College, civil station, Kunnamangalam, Koduvally, Thamarassery, Chellot, Chitragiri and Road to Gudallor from Kerala border.

State highway 38 starts from Pavangad near passes through Ulliyeri, Perambra, Kuttiady, Nadapuram, Panoor and Koothuparamba and ends at Chovva in Kannur. The highway is 107 km (66 miles) long. It is one of the busiest route in the district.

SH 54 connects the city to Kalpetta. The highway is 99.0 km (61.5 miles) long. The highway passes through Pavangad, Kozhikode, Ulliyeri, Perambra, Poozhithodu, Peruvannamuzhi and Padinjarethara. SH 68 starts from Kappad and ends in Adivaram. The highway is 68.11 km (42.32 miles) long.

SH 34 starts from Koyilandy and ends in Edavanna which is 44.0 km (27.3 miles) long. This highway passes through Koyilandi, Ulliyeri, Balussery, Thamarassery, Omassery and Mukkam.

SH 68 starts from Kappad and ends in Adivaram which is 66 km (41 miles) long. This highway passes through Atholi, Nanminda, Narikkuni, Koduvally, Omassery, Kodenchery and Thusharagiri.

==== Buses ====
Buses, predominantly run by individual owners, ply on the routes within the city and to nearby locations. City buses are painted green. Kerala State Road Transport Corporation (KSRTC) runs regular services to many destinations in the state and to the neighboring states. The city has three bus stands. All private buses to the suburban and nearby towns ply from the Palayam Bus Stand. Private buses to adjoining districts start from the Mofussil Bus Stand on Indira Gandhi Road (Mavoor Road). Buses operated by the KSRTC drive from the KSRTC bus stand on Indira Gandhi Road. KSRTC Bus Stand Kozhikode is the largest bus stand in Kerala having a size of 36,036.47 m^{2} (387,893.3 sq ft). There are also KSRTC depots in Thamarassery, Thottilpalam, Thiruvambady and Vatakara. There are three routes available to Bangalore. Kozhikode–Sulthan Bathery-Gundlupet–Mysore–Bangalore is the preferred one and is very busy. Another route is Kozhikode-Manathavady-Kutta-Mysore-Bangalore. The third one, less used, is Kozhikode–Gundlupet–Chamarajanagar–Kollegal–Bangalore.

Private tour operators maintain regular luxury bus services to Mumbai, Bangalore, Coimbatore, Chennai, Vellore, Ernakulam, Trivandrum, Ooty, Mysore, etc. and mainly operate from the Palayam area. These are usually night services.

=== Rail ===
Kozhikode has a main railway station, where all passing trains stops. There are other railway stations within the City limits. They are Elathur, West Hill, Vellayil and Kallai. Only local passenger trains stops in these stations. One can travel to almost all destinations within the country from Kozhikode. The history of railways in Kerala dates to 1861 when the first tracks were laid between Tirur and Beypore.

=== Air ===
Calicut International Airport is 26 km (16 miles) from the city. It began operations in 1988. Domestic services are operated to major Indian cities. It received the status of an international airport in 2006.

== Economy ==
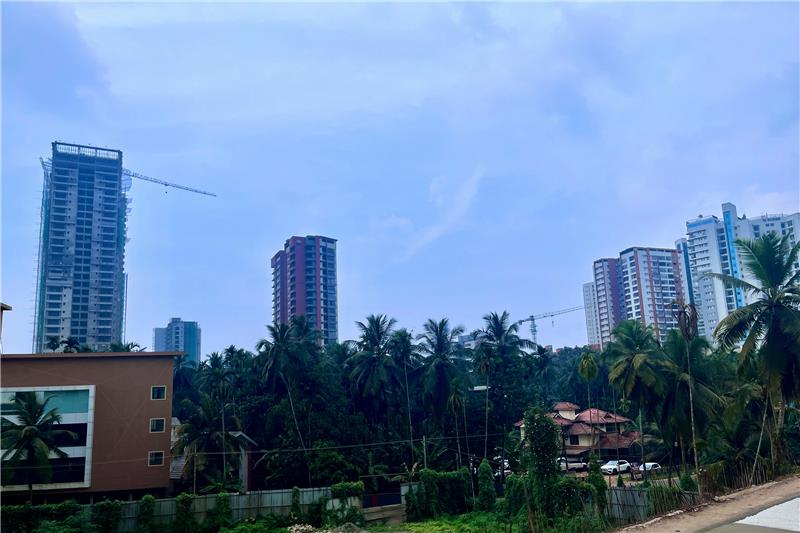
High-rises near NH Bypass Calicut

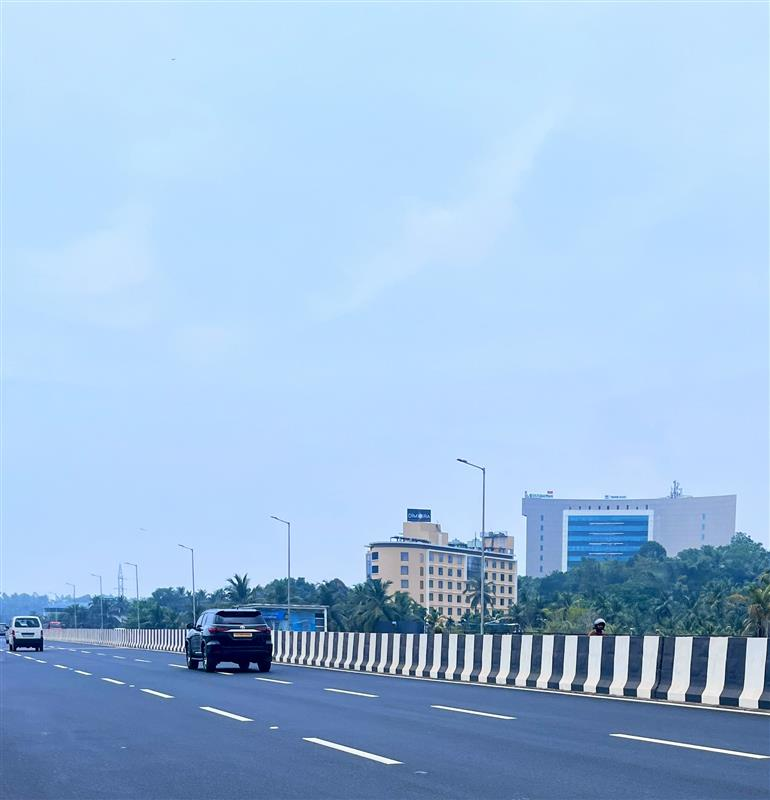
"Calicut Bypass near Cyberpark – a growing economic corridor."

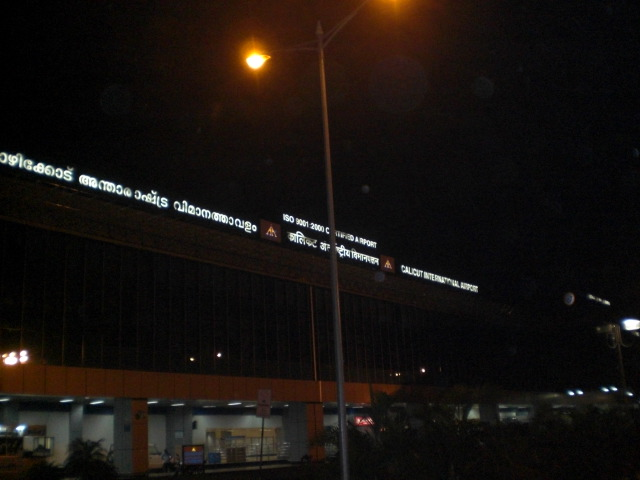
Ccj airport

Kozhikode is one of the largest economic hubs in the Indian state of Kerala, with its economy primarily driven by the service sector, followed by industrial activities. The city has a rich banking history, being the birthplace of Nedungadi Bank, the first and oldest bank in modern Kerala, which was established by Appu Nedungadi in 1899. The bank was later merged with Punjab National Bank.

Information Technology and Business Sector Kozhikode is emerging as a major center for information technology (IT) in Kerala. Cyberpark, a Government of Kerala initiative, was established to build, operate, and manage IT parks in the Malabar region to promote investment in IT and IT-enabled services (ITES). It is set to become the third IT hub in Kerala, following Technopark in Thiruvananthapuram and Infopark in Kochi. The Cyberpark initiative, along with its satellite centers in Kannur and Kasaragod, is expected to generate around 100,000 direct job opportunities.

Other major IT and business hubs in Kozhikode include UL Cyberpark, which is the first IT SEZ (Special Economic Zone) in the Malabar region, Government Cyberpark, and Hilite Business Park, which houses multiple IT firms and corporate offices.

Industrial and Infrastructure Development Kozhikode is also witnessing significant industrial growth, with key upcoming projects such as:

Birla IT Park (Mavoor) – A proposed technology and industrial park. Malaysian Satellite City (Kinaloor) – A large-scale industrial park planned by KINFRA, covering 160-hectare (400-acre). Kozhikode Bypass Economic Corridor – A growing commercial and IT corridor near Cyberpark. Additionally, Beypore Port is undergoing development to enhance maritime trade and cargo handling capabilities.

Cultural Recognition In 2012, Kozhikode was officially recognized as the "City of Sculptures" (Shilpa Nagaram) due to the numerous architectural sculptures and artistic landmarks found throughout the city.

== Culture ==
According to data compiled by economics research firm Indicus Analytics in 2009 on residences, earnings and investments, Kozhikode was ranked the second-best city in India to live in.

=== Shopping ===
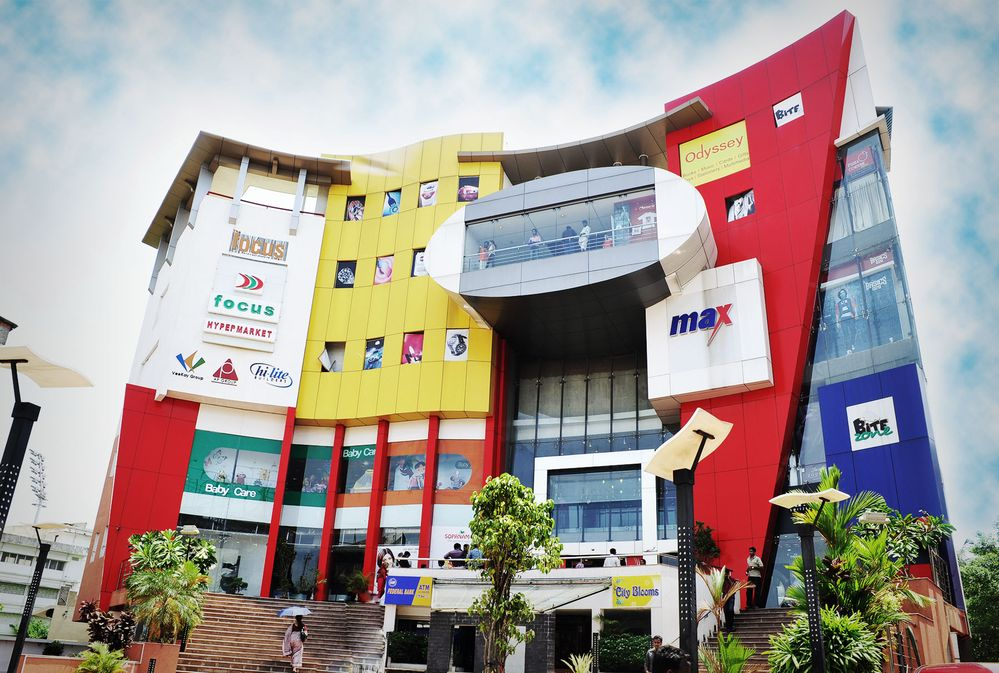
The Focus Mall, the first shopping mall of its kind in the State

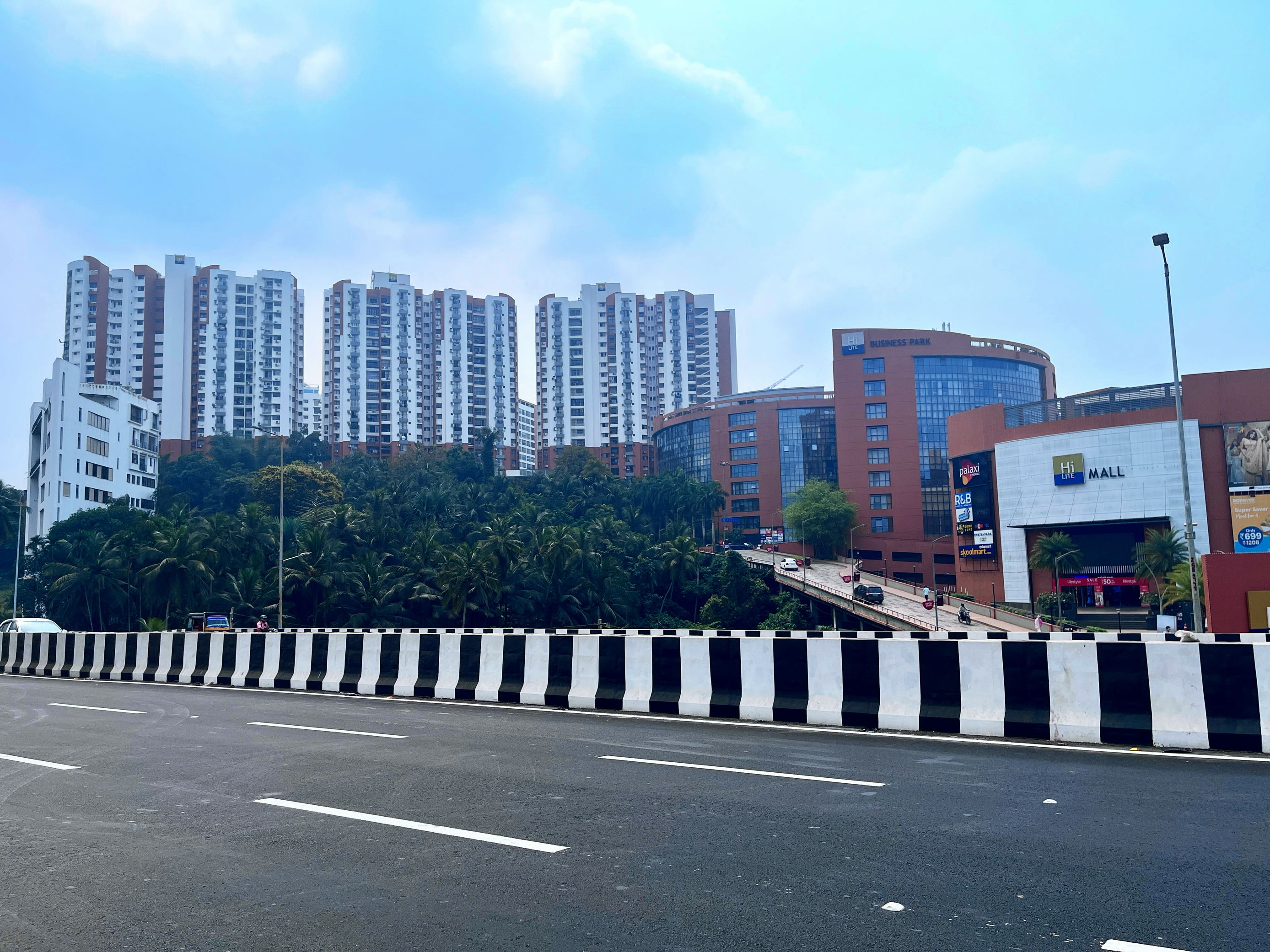
"HiLITE Mall – The Largest Shopping Destination in Malabar"

The city has a strong mercantile tradition, with trade and commerce playing a significant role in its economy. Historically, the primary commercial hub was Valiyangadi (Big Bazaar), located near the railway station. This area served as the center of business activity for decades, catering to wholesale and retail traders. Over time, the commercial focus gradually shifted to other parts of the city, with Mittai Theruvu (Sweetmeat Street or S. M. Street) emerging as the new commercial hub. This bustling street is lined with a variety of shops selling textiles, cosmetics, household essentials, and electronics. It is also home to several well-known restaurants and traditional sweetmeat shops that reflect Kozhikode's rich culinary heritage.

With urbanization and the growing influence of modern retail culture, Kozhikode has witnessed the rise of shopping malls that offer a mix of retail outlets, entertainment zones, and dining facilities. Some of the major malls in the city include:

Focus Mall – The first shopping mall in Kerala, marking the beginning of modern retail spaces in the state. It features a range of branded outlets, a food court, and entertainment facilities.

Hilite Mall Calicut– The largest shopping mall in the Malabar region, part of the HiLITE City project. The mall houses over 200 retail stores, including international and domestic brands, a multiplex cinema, a large food court, and dedicated entertainment zones.

Gokulam Mall – A mid-sized shopping complex featuring multiple retail outlets, dining options, and a multiplex. Address Mall – A modern shopping destination with luxury brand stores, restaurants, and entertainment facilities. RP Mall – A popular retail and entertainment hub, featuring a mix of branded stores, food courts, and a cinema. Lulu Mall Kozhikode – Developed by LuLu Group International, this newly established mall in Mankavu is one of the largest retail projects in the region. It brings a world-class shopping experience with a variety of international brands, hypermarkets, and entertainment facilities.

The emergence of these malls has significantly transformed Kozhikode's retail landscape, providing residents and visitors with modern shopping and leisure experiences.

=== Music ===
In addition to the Malabar Mahotsavam, the annual cultural fest of Kozhikode, every year since 1981 the Tyagaraja Aradhana Trust has been conducting a five-day music festival in honour of Tyagaraja. The festival is complete with the Uncchavritti, rendering of Divyanama kritis, Pancharatna Kritis, concerts by professional artistes and students of music from morning to late in the evening.

Kozhikode has a tradition of Ghazal and Hindustani music appreciation. There are many Malayalam Ghazals. The late film director and play back singer M. S. Baburaj, from Kozhikode was influenced by Ghazal and Hindustani.

== Media ==
=== Newspapers ===
Newspaper publishing started in Kozhikode with the launch of the English weekly West Coast Spectator in 1879. Edited by Dr. Keys and printed by Vakil Poovadan Raman from the Spectator Press, it was rechristened the Malabar Spectator in later years. The first Malayalam newspaper in Kozhikode was Kerala Pathrika established by Chengalathu Kunhirama Menon in 1884. Keralam, Kerala Sanchari and Bharathivasam were among the other newspapers published in Kozhikode in the 19th century. Some of the major newspapers that contributed to the Indian independence movement Mathrubhumi and Mithavadi, were based in Kozhikode. Now almost all the major newspapers in Malayalam have editions in Kozhikode. English newspapers such as The Hindu and The New Indian Express also have Kozhikode editions.

=== Radio ===
The Kozhikode radio station of All India Radio has two transmitters: Kozhikode AM (100 kilowatts) and Kozhikode FM [Vividh Bharathi] (10 kilowatts). Private FM radio stations are Radio Mango 91.9 operated by Malayala Manorama Co. Ltd. Radio Mirchi operated by Entertainment Network India Ltd. and Club FM 104.8 operated by Mathrubhumi group and Red FM 93.5 of the SUN Network. AIR FM radio stations are Kozhikode – 103.6 MHz; AIR MW radio station is Kozhikode – 684 kHz.

=== Television ===
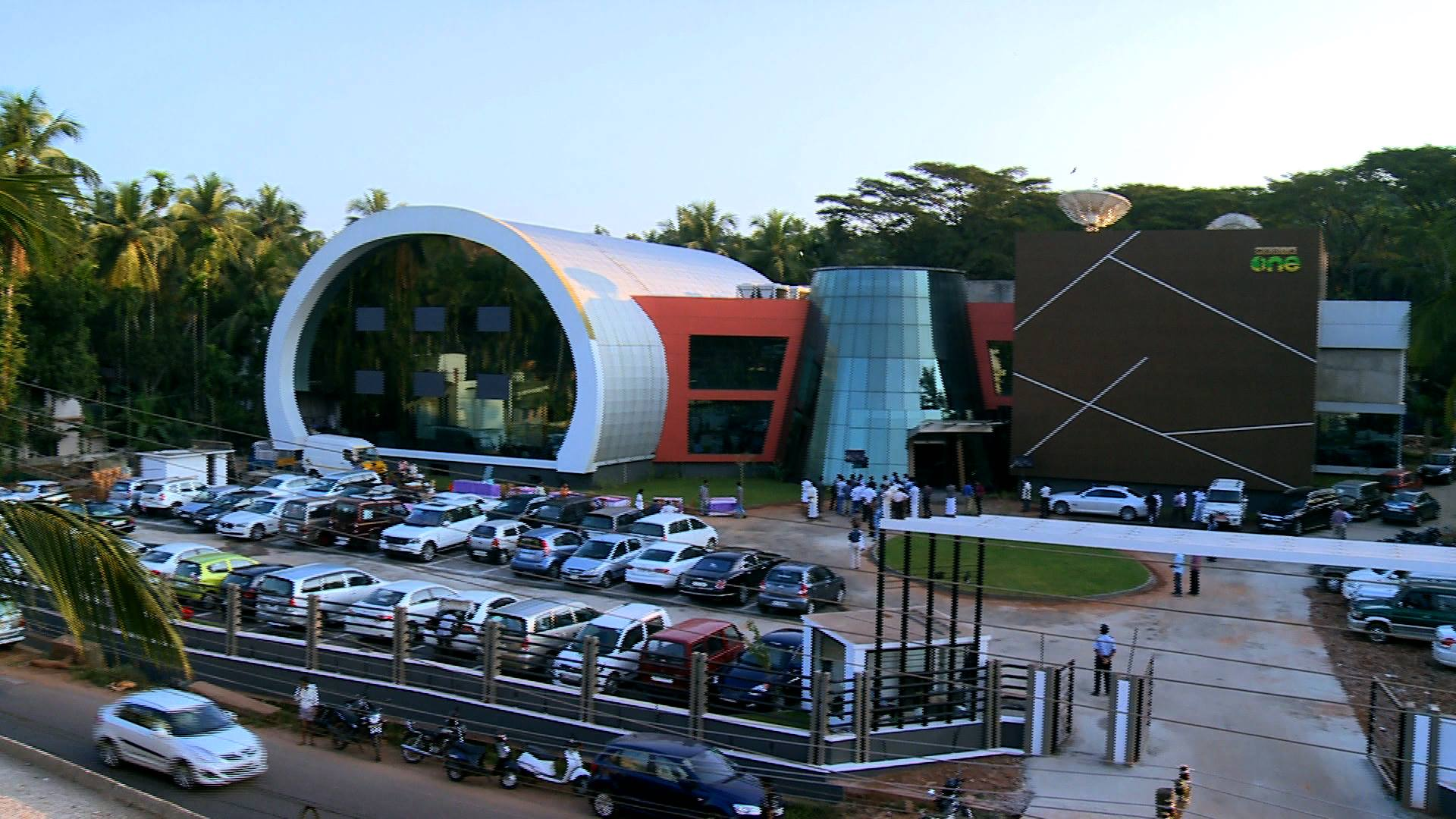
MediaOne TV Headquarters And Studio

A television transmitter has been functioning in Kozhikode since 3 July 1984, relaying programmes from Delhi and Thiruvananthapuram Doordarshan. Doordarshan has its broadcasting centre in Kozhikode at Medical College. The Malayalam channels based on Kozhikode are the Shalom Television, Darshana TV and Media One TV. All major channels in Malayalam viz. Manorama News, Asianet, Surya TV, Kairali TV, Amrita TV, Jeevan TV, and Jaihind have their studios and news bureaus in the city.

Satellite television services are available through DD Direct+, Dish TV, Sun Direct DTH and Tata Sky. Asianet Digital TV is popularly known as ACV telecasts daily city news. Spidernet is another local channel. Other local operators include KCL and Citinet.

The Calicut Press Club came into existence in 1970. It is the nerve centre of all media activities, both print and electronic. Begun with around 70 members in the roll, this Press Club, became a prestigious and alert media centre in the state with a present membership of over 280.

== Education ==
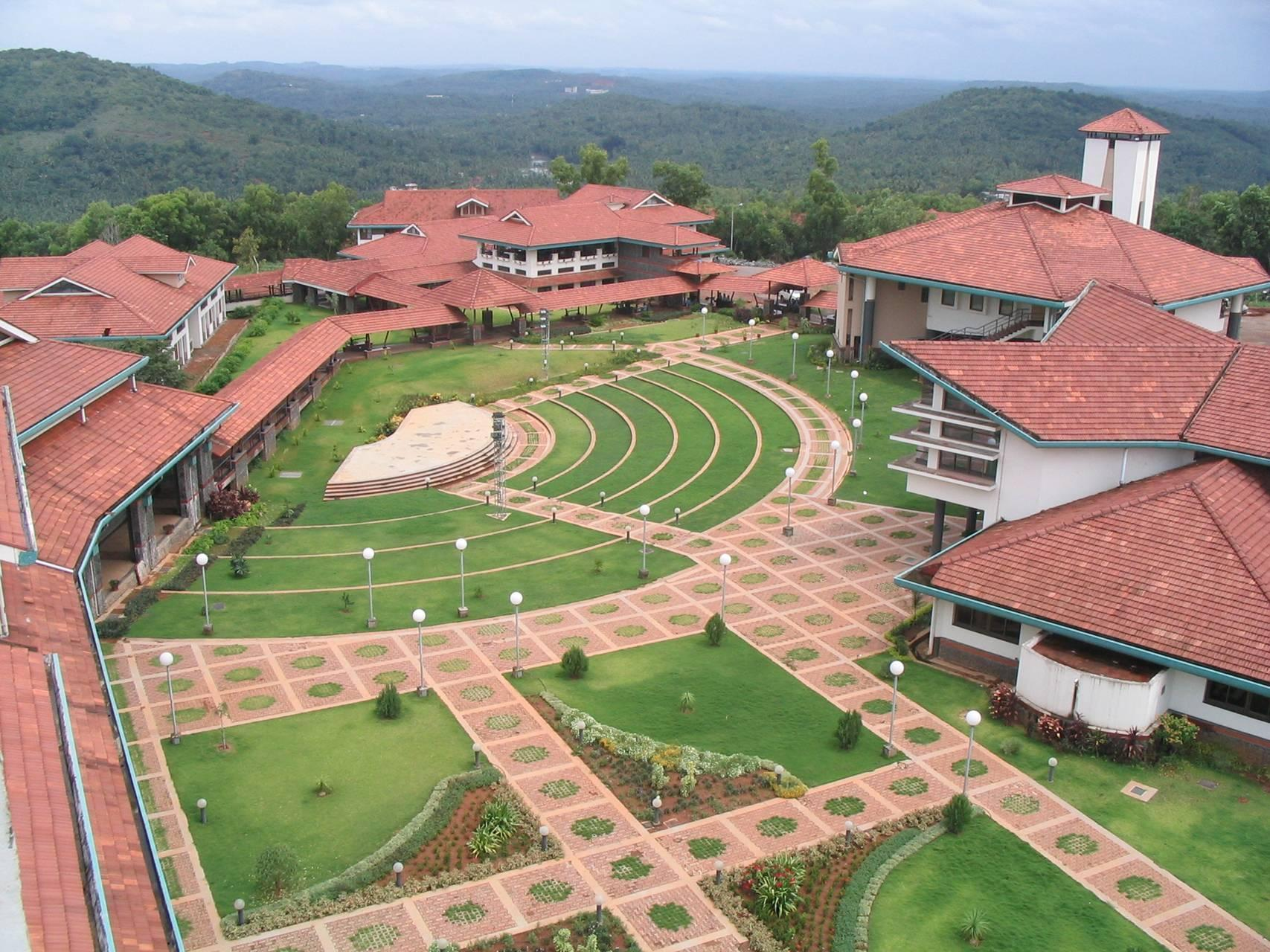
Indian Institute of Management Kozhikode

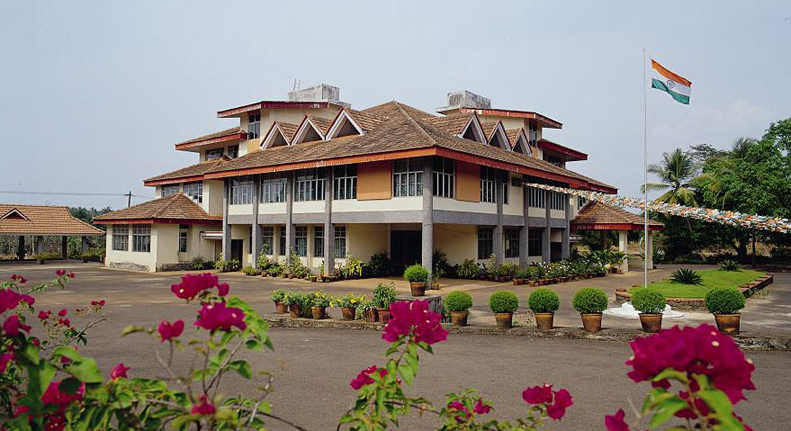
National Institute of Technology Calicut

There are 1,237 schools in Kozhikode district including 191 highschools.

Kozhikode is home to two premier educational institutions of national importance: the Indian Institute of Management Kozhikode (IIMK), and the National Institute of Technology Calicut (NITC). Other research institutions located in Kozhikode include National Institute for Research and Development in Defence Shipbuilding (NIRDESH), Indian Institute of Spices Research (IISR), Centre for Water Resources Development and Management (CWRDM), Kerala School of Mathematics and National Institute of Electronics and Information Technology (NIELIT).

The University of Calicut is the largest university in Kerala and is located in Thenjipalam, about 24 km (15 miles) south of Calicut. This university was established in 1968 and was the second university set up in Kerala. Most of the colleges offering tertiary education in the region are affiliated to this university. The Calicut Medical College was established in 1957 as the second medical college in Kerala. Since then, the institution has grown into a premier centre of medical education in the state. Presently it is the largest medical institute in the state with a yearly intake of 250 candidates for the undergraduate programme.

The Government Law College, Kozhikode situated in Vellimadukunnu on the out skirts of kozhikode town, is owned by the Government of Kerala and affiliated to the University of Calicut. The college caters to the needs of the north Malabar region of Kerala it is the third law college in kerala state founded in 1970.

=== Major colleges in calicut city ===
- The Zamorin's Guruvayoorappan College
- Malabar Christian College
- Farook College
- Devagiri College
- Providence college for women
- Govt. Arts & science college, Meenchantha
- Kerala Government Polytechnic College, West Hill
- Government Engineering College, Kozhikode.

== Health ==
Many hospitals and clinics are working in Kozhikode. Some of the major health centres are Government Medical College and Hospital, Beach Government Hospital, National Hospital and Baby Memorial Hospital.

== Sports ==
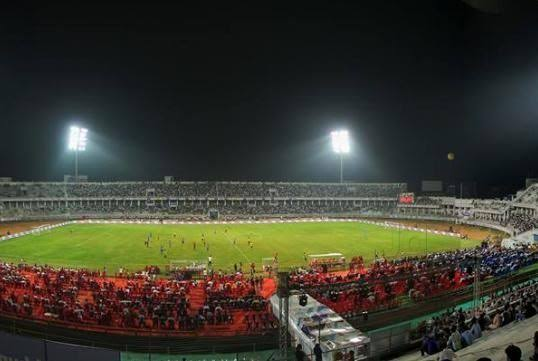
Fans of Gokulam Kerala at the EMS Stadium during an I-League match in 2017

The city of Kozhikode is home to many popular professional sports teams. The most popular sport is football (Gokulam Kerala club – I-League Champion in 2020–21 and 2021–22), followed by volleyball (Calicut Heroes – 2024 Champion).

=== Men's sports ===
- Gokulam Kerala: men's I-League team
- Calicut FC: Super League Kerala club Calicut FC, they are the defending champions of the league.
- Calicut Heroes: men's volleyball team.

=== Women's sports ===
- Gokulam Kerala: women's football team, three-times Indian Champion.2019–20, 2021–22, 2022–23

== Twin/sister cities ==
Calicut's sister city or twin city is

- Tver, Russia

== See also ==
- List of tallest buildings in Kozhikode
- North Malabar
- Malabar District
- South Malabar
- Kozhikode East
- Kozhikode North
- Kozhikode South
- List of people from Kozhikode
- Largest Indian cities by GDP

== Sources ==
- Ayyar, K. V. Krishna (1999) [1938]. The Zamorins of Calicut: from the earliest times down to A.D. 1806. Publication Division, University of Calicut. ISBN 978-81-7748-000-9. Archived from the original on 14 April 2023.
- Chandran, VP (2018). Mathrubhumi Yearbook Plus - 2019 (in Malayalam). Kozhikode: P. V. Chandran, Managing Editor, Mathrubhumi Printing & Publishing Company Limited, Kozhikode.
