= Pantheeramkavu =

Pantheerankavu Pantheerankavu പന്തീരാങ്കാവ്
- Town
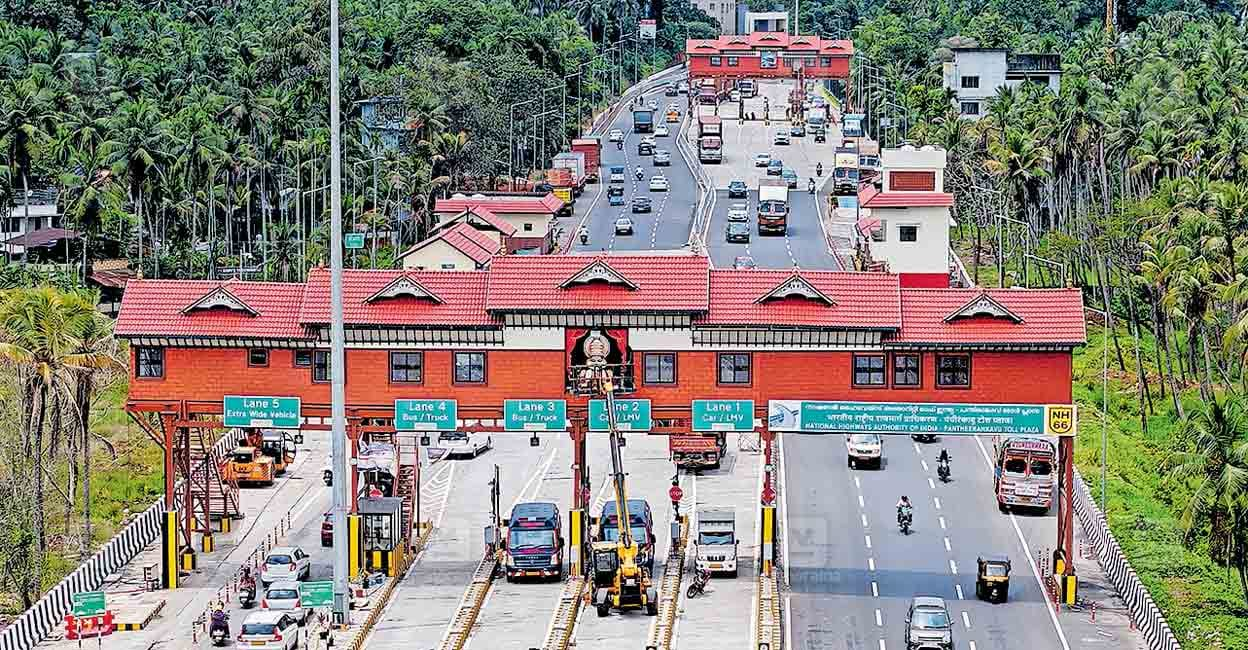
- Pantheerankavu Toll Plaza
- Interactive map of Pantheerankavu
- Coordinates: 11.326820°N 75.8906000°E
- Country: India
- State: Kerala
- District: Kozhikode

Government
  - Pantheerankave: Pantheerankave

Population (2001)
  - Total: 24,495

Languages
  - Official: Malayalam, English
- Time zone: UTC+5:30 (IST)
- PIN: 673019
- Telephone code: 0495- 2430001(T.Exchange)
- Vehicle registration: KL-85
- Sex ratio: 1:1 ♂/♀

Pantheerankavu or Pantheerankavu is a town near Kozhikode city in India. It is located 9 km (5.6 mi) away from Kozhikode city. It is a part of Kunnamangalam or Chathamangalam assembly constituency.

== Pantheerankavu ==
Pantheerankave or Pantheerankavu means, the place with Twelve Kavu(Temples) which are from Kodal Nadakkavu, Arappuzha, moorkkanadu, Puthurmadham, Kunnathupalam, Kaimpalam, Manakkadavu, Muthuvanathara, Poolenkara. Pantheerankavu formerly known as Kailamadham.

== Demographics ==
Today Pantheeramkavu is a fast-growing town with a population of 45,495. Pantheeramkavu has an average literacy rate of 84%, higher than the national average of 59.5%: male literacy is 86%, and female literacy is 82%. In Pantheeramkavu, 11% of the population is under 6 years of age.

An amoebic infection surfaced in August 2025 when a woman fromPantheerankavu tested positive.

== Location ==
The new National Highway 66 bypass is passing through the heart of Pantheeramkave which is connecting the entire kerala. Chaliyar River is just 5 minutes driving and Calicut International Airport is just 20 km (12 mi) away.

== Suburbs and villages ==
- Manakkadavu
- Poolenkara
- Kodal Nadakkavu
- Palazhy
- Iringallur
- Olavanna
- Puthoormadam
- Perumanna
- Arappuzha
- Azhinjilam
- Muthuvanatthara
- Pallipuram
- Pulparambil

== See also ==
- Airport Road, Kozhikode
