= List of people from Kozhikode =

This is a list of notable people from Calicut.

== Literature ==
- Cherusseri Namboothiri - Poet
- S.K. Pottekkatt - Writer
- Thikkodiyan - Writer
- N.N. Kakkad - Poet
- P. Valsala - Writer
- Akbar Kakkattil - Writer
- Punathil Kunjabdulla - Writer
- Chengalathu Kunhirama Menon - Editor and founder

== Politics ==
- K Kelappan - Freedom Fighter.
- KR Moopan - Social Leader.
- John Mathai- First Railway Minister of India.
- PP Ummer Koya - Ex Education Minister of Kerala.
- CH Mohammed Koya- Ex CM of Kerala.
- PM Aboobacker- Ex MLA (6 Terms)
- TP Ramakrishnan: Ex Excise and Labour Minister of Kerala.
- MK Muneer: Ex Social Welfare and Panchayath Affairs Minister of Kerala
- PM Muhammed Riyas: PWD and Tourism Minister of Kerala.
- Ahamed Devarkovil: Ex Ports, Museums, Archaeology and Archive Minister of Kerala.
- K Surendran: President of BJP Kerala State.

== Entertainment ==
- Mona Vasu - Cine actress
- Hareesh Perumanna - Actor
- Ansiba Hassan - Cine actress
- Kozhikode Narayanan Nair - Actor
- Santhosh Pandit - Actor
- Mamukkoya - Actor
- Parvathy Thiruvothu - Cine actress
- Biyon - Cine Actor
- Bhagyalakshmi - Cine actress
- Nandana - Cine actress
- Anagha LK - Cine actress
- Athira Patel - Cine actress
- Sajan K Ram - Film score composer
- Akhila Sasidharan - Cine actress
- Neena Kurup - Cine actress
- Monisha Unni - Cine actress
- Bindu panicker - Cine actress
- Ranjitha - Cine actress
- Avanthika Mohan - Cine actress
- Nithya Das - Cine actress
- Anjali Menon, film director
- Neeraj Madhav, Cine actor
- Mani Madhava Chakyar, Cine actor
- Ann Augustine - Actress
- Roshan Basheer - Actor
- Balan K. Nair - Cine Actor
- A. Vincent - Film Director
- Girish Puthenchery - Lyricist
- Madhupal - Actor / Director
- Prajin - Cine actress
- I.V. Sasi - Film director
- Jomol - Cine actress
- Sija Rose - Cine actress
- Maria Margaret Sharmilee - Cine actress
- Rajisha Vijayan - Cine actress
- Nellikode Bhaskaran - Actor
- Hariharan - Film director
- P. S. Nivas -(Cinematographer)- Film director
- T. Damodaran - Film script writer
- Deedi Damodaran - Film script writer
- K.P. Ummer - Cine actor
- Kozhikode Abdul Kader - Playbaack singer
- Chandini Sreedharan - Cine Actress
- Kuthiravattam Pappu - Actor
- M.S. Baburaj - Music director
- Mamukkoya - Cine actor
- P.M Taj - Dramatist & Writer
- P.V. Gangadharan - Business man & Film producer
- Sudheesh - Cine actor
- Ranjith - Cine actor, director&Writer
- Augustine - Cine actor
- Swargachitra Appachan - Producer
- Anoop Menon- Cine actor & Writer
- Manu Manjith- Lyricist
- Jenith Kachappilly - Film director
- Vinod Kozhikode - Cine Actor
- Dinanath Puthenchery - Lyricist
- Vinod Kovoor - Cine Actor
- Surabhi Lakshmi - Actress
- Sasi Kalinga - Actor
- Sreya Jayadeep - Playback Singer
- Mridula Warrier - Playback Singer
- Street Academics (Hip-hop group)
- Ronson Vincent, Actor
- Sreedevi Unni, Dance, Actress
- Mareena Michael Kurisingal Actress
- Gopika Anil Actress
- Suveeran, Film Director

== Sports ==
- P. T. Usha - Athlete turned Coach
- Olympian Abdurahiman - Football player, participated in the 1956 Summer Olympics
- Tom Joseph - captain of Indian volleyball team
- Roy Joseph - Indian Volleyball player
- Mayookha Johny - Indian Athlete
- V Diju - Indian Badminton Player
- Aparna Balan - Indian Badminton Player
- Arun Vishnu - Indian Badminton Player
- Prasanth Karuthadathkuni - Football player
- Jinson Johnson - Olympian, Indian Athlete
- Kishor Kumar - Former Indian Volleyball Captain
- Rehenesh TP - Football player
- Jisna Mathew - Indian

Athlete

- Jaseel P. Ismail - Badminton player
- Jiju Jacob - Football Player

== Art ==
- Mani Madhava Chakyar - Performance artist
- M.V. Devan - painter, sculptor
- Bhanumati Rao - Classical dancer
- Sasikrishnan - sculptor
- Gopikrishnan - cartoonist

== Religious ==
- Ayyathan Gopalan - Renaissance leader and social reformer, Doctor, Writer.
- Ayyathan Janaki Ammal -First women doctor and surgeon of Kerala, First Malayali Lady Doctor.
- Vagbhatananda - hindu religious leader
- Sheikh Abubakr Ahmad - community leader, muslim scholar
- Maxwell Valentine Noronha - Bishop
- E. K. Aboobacker Musliyar - community leader, muslim scholar
- Ibraheem Khaleel Al Bukhari - muslim scholar

== Others ==
- Thangam Philip - Nutritionist
- P. Vijayan - IPS officer, ADGP (Kerala Police)
- Verghese Kurien - Pioneer of white revolution
- Major Sandeep Unnikrishnan - former Indian Army officer who was martyred during the 2008 Mumbai Terror Attacks, posthumous recipient of the Ashoka Chakra
- Ravi Varma of Padinjare Kovilakam - Royal family
