= Kaithaparampu =

- village
- Location in Kerala, India Kaithaparampu (India)
- Coordinates: 9°6′0″N 76°46′0″E
- Country: India
- State: Kerala
- District: Pathanamthitta

Languages
  - Official: Malayalam, English
- Time zone: UTC+5:30 (IST)
- Climate: Tropical monsoon (Köppen)
- Avg. summer temperature: 35 °C (95 °F)
- Avg. winter temperature: 20 °C (68 °F)

Kaithaparampu (Kaithaparambu) is a village and part of Ezhamkulam Panchayath in the Pathanamthitta district of Kerala. It is part of the Adoor constituency of Kerala State and Indian Parliament.

Many people from this village are employed in Gulf countries, a factor which contributes greatly to the prosperity of the village. Farming activity here is characterized by small farms with mixed varieties of food crops and rubber.

Post office at Kaithaparampu was started in early 1960s as branch office of Enathu Main Post Office with PIN Code 691 526. There is a Government Primary Health Center, with two full time doctors and support staff.

Academic institutions in and around the village include Government LPS Elappupara Pattazhi, Government Higher Secondary School Nedumon and KVVS College of Science and Technology, Kaithaparampu, St.Cyril's College, Kilivayal, Adoor and St.Stephen's College, Maloor, Pattazy Vadakkekkara, Pathanapuram.

Prominent religious institutions in the village are Marthasmooni Orthodox Church, St. George Orthodox Church, St.Mary's Malankara Catholic Church and Sri Subramanya Swami Temple. In addition, there are several non episcopal churches including Brotheran, Sharon and IPC.
