= K. V. Krishna Iyer =

Indian writer

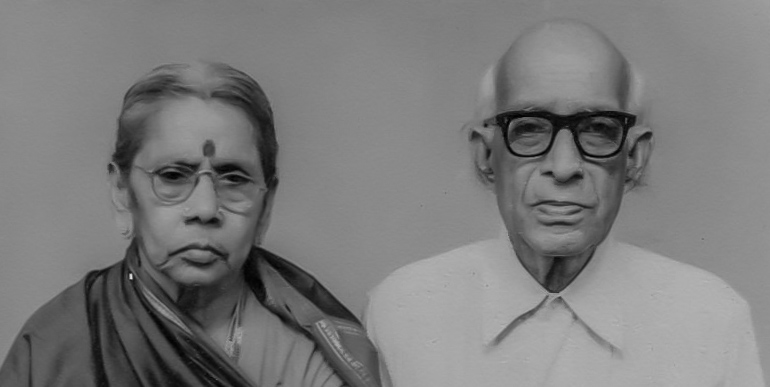
KV Krishna Iyer and his wife Annapoorani Iyer

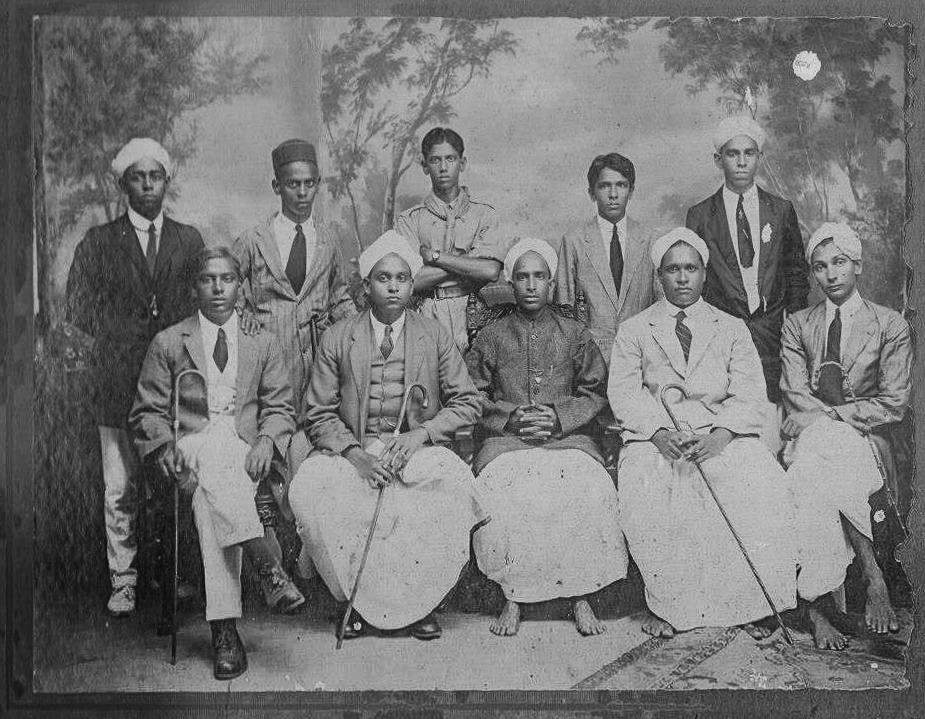
KV Krishna Iyer is wearing black suit and white dhoti sitting 3rd from left

K. V. Krishna Iyer (1896–1982) was a professor of history at Zamorin's Guruvayurappan College, Kozhikode. He is considered an authority on the history of Kerala.

He has authored important historical books namely The Zamorins of Calicut, History of Kerala and History of Guruvayur, which are based on facts from his personal research on available records like Olagranthangal, Vattezhuthu and Kolezhuthu inscribed on copper plates.

His radio talks on the arrival of the Portuguese, Dutch, Arabs on the Malabar coast and their interaction with the locals were highly appreciated; as also his newspaper articles on Kerala land tenure. Two of his students, P. P. Ummer Koya and C. H. Mohammed Koya, ministers in the Kerala cabinet compelled him to adorn many committees on History, Archeology and Anthropology of Kerala.

== Selected bibliography ==
- Zamorins of Calicut: From the earliest times to A D 1806. Calicut: Norman Printing Bureau, 1938.
- Short History of Kerala. Ernakulam: Pai & Co, 1966.
- The History of Guruvayoor. Published by Guruvayoor Dewaswam: 1986.
