= Hilite Mall Calicut =

Shopping mall in Kerala, India

HiLITE Mall Calicut
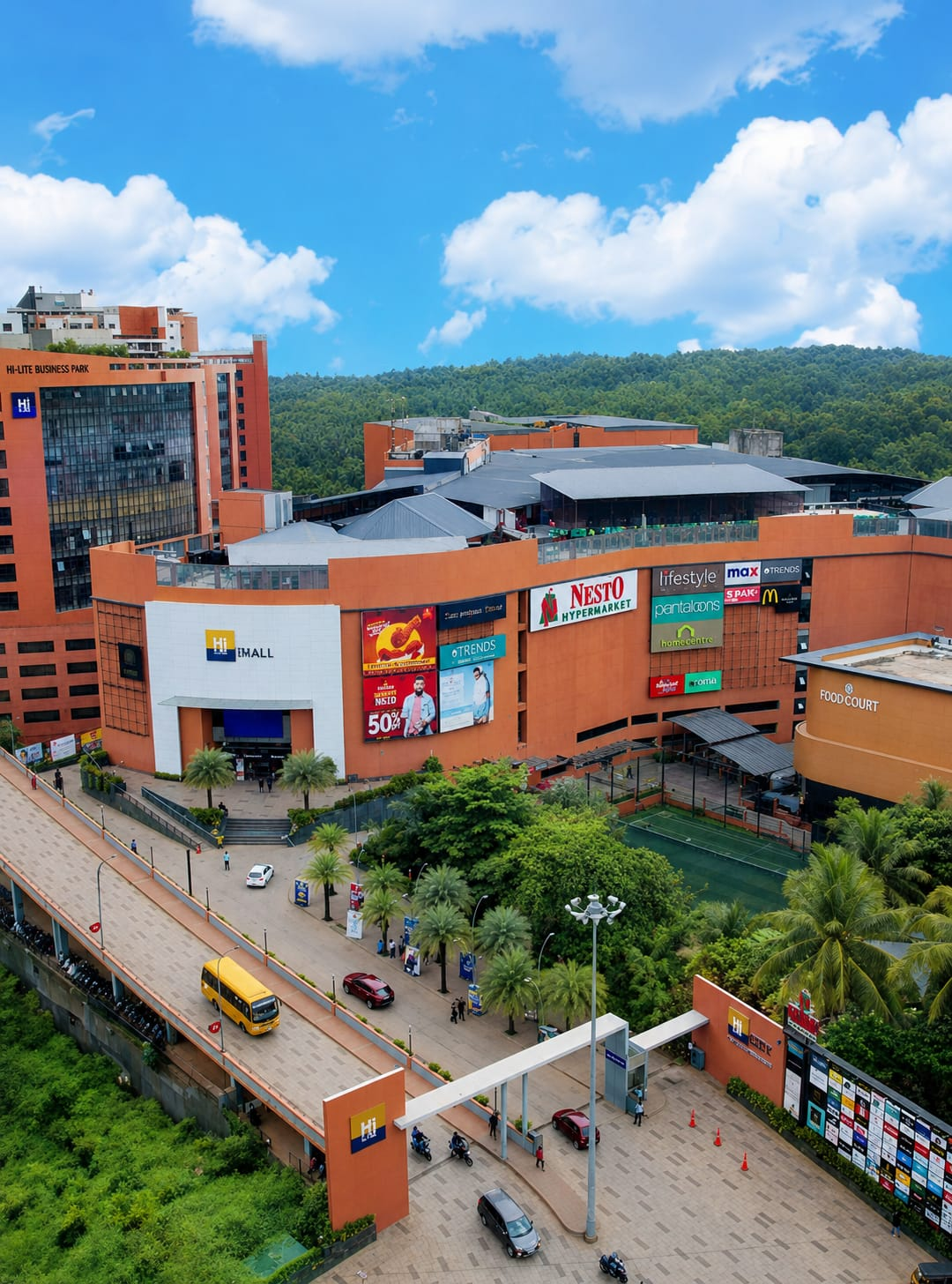
- HiLITE Mall Calicut in 2026
- Location: Kozhikode, Kerala, India
- Coordinates: 11.254632°N 75.824642°E
- Address: Hilite City
- Opened: 10 April 2015
- Developer: HiLITE Realtors
- Manager: Sulaiman P
- Owner: HiLITE
- Num. of stores: 200+
- Num. of anchor tenants: 5 major anchors
- Floor area: 810,000 square feet (75,000 m^{2})
- Floors: 4
- Website: hilitemall.com/calicut/home

HiLITE Mall is a shopping and entertainment complex located in the Kozhikode district, in the Malabar region of Kerala, India. Developed by the HiLITE Group as part of the larger HiLITE City project and operated by HiLITE Urban, the mall is situated along National Highway 66 near Palazhi, on the outskirts of Kozhikode city.

The mall covers a total built-up area of 1,260,000 sq ft (117,000 m²), with 810,000 sq ft (75,000 m²) of retail space, making it one of the largest shopping malls in Kerala. It opened to the public on 10 April 2015.

Facilities at HiLITE Mall include a large food court, restaurants, family entertainment zones, a children's play area, a snow-themed attraction, gaming arcades, billiards facilities, beauty parlours, and a bowling alley. It also houses Palaxi Cinemas, an eight-screen multiplex featuring Kerala's first EPIQ (Enhanced Presentation in Digital Cinema) large-format screen.

HiLITE Mall has also been described as India's first fully solar-p.

== Location ==
HiLITE Mall is located along National Highway 66 at the Palazhi bypass junction, on the outskirts of Kozhikode.

The mall is situated near major IT hubs of the city, including the government-run Cyberpark and the ULCCS Technology Park. Its proximity to these business areas contributes to weekday visitor traffic from working professionals and families.

== Sustainability ==
HiLITE Mall has been described as India's first fully solar-powered shopping mall, setting a benchmark in sustainable infrastructure. The solar plants, developed in partnership with INKEL Ltd, supply power to the entire mall complex and reduce reliance on conventional energy sources.

The initiative began with the Calicut and Thrissur malls, where solar plants with a combined capacity of 12 MW generate over 48,000 units of renewable energy daily. This reduces approximately 28,750 tons of carbon emissions annually, an effect comparable to planting 1.3 million trees or removing more than 6,000 petrol vehicles from circulation.

== Structure and facilities ==
HiLITE Mall has a total built-up area of 1,260,000 sq ft (117,000 m²), with 810,000 sq ft (75,000 m²) dedicated to retail space, making it one of the largest shopping malls in Kerala.

Facilities at the mall include:

- Food courts and restaurants, including one of India's largest food courts offering international and regional cuisines.
- Family entertainment zones and children's play areas
- Snow Fantasy, an indoor snow-themed attraction.
- Bowling alley, billiards, and gaming zones
- Toy train ride inside the premises
- Beauty salons and lifestyle outlets

The mall also houses an eight-screen multiplex, Palaxi Cinemas, which includes an EPIQ large-format screen.
