= Indicus Analytics =

Indian economics research firm

- Type: Subsidiary
- Industry: Economic
- Founded: 2000
- Founder: Laveesh Bhandari
- Defunct: 2023
- Fate: Acquired by Nielsen Holdings PLC in 2014
- Headquarters: New Delhi
- Key people: Laveesh Bhandari (Director); Sumita Kale (Chief Economist)
- Services: Research services, software analytics and data products
- Owner: Nielsen Holdings
- Website: www.indus.net at the Wayback Machine (archived June 1, 2023)

Indicus Analytics was an Indian economics research firm based in New Delhi. The company offered research services and data products to both national and international corporations (including consulting firms), educational institutions and government organizations.

== History ==
Indicus Analytics was founded in 2000 in Delhi by Laveesh Bhandari. It made its first product in 2002 and launched software based version of its products in 2007.

In 2014, Indicus was acquired by Nielsen India.

=== Initiatives ===
In February 2008, Indicus brought out a white paper ‘Transforming West Bengal - Changing the Agenda for an Agenda for Change’ which deciphered the progress in the state for 50 years and suggested reform measures.

In July 2008, Indicus conducted a study ‘Freedom to Choose’ with Outlook Money to find out the changes that have occurred in the six major areas of personal finance.

In association with Prabhat Khabar, a leading daily, Indicus conducted a study of Jharkhand state ‘Jharkhand Development Report 2009’ in January 2009.

In April 2009, Google partnered with Indicus Analytics to launch an Election Centre for Lok Sabha elections in India. Indicus provided election related news and development data related to socio economic progress of various parliamentary constituencies since 2004 Lok Sabha elections in India.

Indicus conducted the annual feature ‘The State of the States’ with India Today. The latest of these was in 2015. The exercise finds out which of the India’s states offer its citizens the best opportunities to live and to earn.

== Services ==
Indicus Analytics made software based analytics products on various facets of Indian economy and Indian consumer. The customer segments served by Indicus included: Insurance, Retail, Banking, Healthcare, Telecommunication, Advertising and Media, Durables, FMCG, Educational Institutions and Financial Services.

Indicus conducted research and data analysis about various facets of Indian economy. Indicus’ research methodology includes Econometric Modeling, Indexing and Ranking, Surveys, Monitoring and Evaluation, Forecasting and Prediction. It conducts research in the following domains - Agriculture, Industry and Services, Consumer Economics, Education, Health and Socio-economy, Employment and Labour, Macro-economy and Finance, Governance & State among others.

== Key Advisors ==
- Bibek Debroy an eminent Indian economist, Professor Bibek Debroy is currently a research Professor at the Centre for Policy Research, New Delhi, India.
- Subir Gokarn is currently deputy Governor of the Reserve Bank of India and former chief economist at CRISIL and Standard & Poor's (for Asia Pacific region).
- Ashok Desai is a Consultant Editor of the Telegraph and is also a Columnist in the Businessworld magazine.
