= Cyberpark, Kozhikode =

Indian business

Coordinates: 10.0015282°N 76.3030518°E

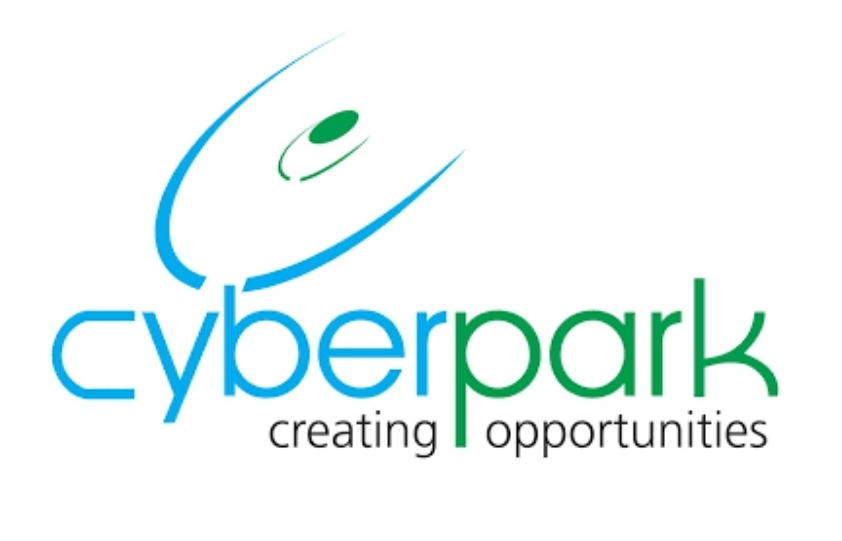
- Type: Government Owned
- Industry: Information Technology Business Park
- Genre: Infrastructure Service Provider
- Founded: 28 January 2009
- Headquarters: Kozhikode, Kerala, India
- Key people: Shri. P K Kunhalikutty , Chairman – Governing Body Mr. Seeram Sambasiva Rao IAS - Chairman -Executive Council Mr Susanth Kurunthil, CEO
- Owner: Government of Kerala
- Website: www.cyberparks.in

Cyberpark Kozhikode is a Government of Kerala owned business park for the promotion and development of investment in Information Technology (IT) and Information Technology Enabled Services (ITES) industries in the Malabar region of Kerala. It was registered under the Societies Act 1860 on January 28, 2009. In addition to this, it has a General Body and a Board of Governors, both of which include top officials of the government. Cyberpark, Kozhikode has been envisioned and conceptualized as a major IT hub catering to the northern part of Kerala for the development of IT/ITeS sector in the state. After a trail-blazing performance with the success of Technopark, Trivandrum and Infopark, Kochi under Kerala IT.

Cyberpark, Kozhikode the first IT park promoted by the state in the Malabar region was established under Cyberparks Kozhikode an autonomous society registered under the Society Registration Act 1860, on 28 January 2009. The ultimate objective was to facilitate state of the art infrastructure space with supporting facilities with an IT ecosystem which would enhance the development of information & communication technology, create direct and indirect job opportunities and parallelly contribute to the economic development of the state.

Cyberpark in association with KSITIL has leased out 5 acres of SEZ land from KSITIL (Developer) in a 45-acre campus and have developed the first IT SEZ building Sahya measuring around 3 lakhs sq.ft. with a structure of double basement + Ground + 4 upper floors. Cyberpark inaugurated the building on 29 May 2017 and is fully operational. Cyberpark presently has over 85 companies functioning, and 2000 IT professionals employed.

Cyberpark operates on a real estate leasing model for information technology (IT) and IT-enabled services (ITeS) companies, offering plug-and-play smart business centers and warm shell options. Approved Special Economic Zone (SEZ) tenants can commence operations immediately or customize leased facilities. The park also provides long-term land leases for IT companies and commercial co-developers, with initial terms of 30 years extendable up to 90 years.

Cyberpark provides infrastructure and support facilities for IT and IT-enabled services (ITeS) companies operating in northern Kerala. Its facilities include digital connectivity, in-house power distribution, backup power systems, and infrastructure associated with its Special Economic Zone (SEZ) status. The park supports the development of the regional IT sector, including small and medium-sized enterprises.

Cyberpark is headed by Shri. Susanth Kurunthil, Chief Executive Officer and governed by Board of Governance with Chairman being the IT Secretary, Electronics and IT department under IT Minister Shri. P K Kunhalikutty

== History ==
In January 2007, the Government of Kerala announced its decision to promote Kozhikode as an IT hub. The proposal to set up an IT park in Kozhikode came in the announcement of the State Government's IT policy made by Chief Minister V.S. Achuthanandan.

Soon after the proposal, a convention under the auspices of Calicut IT Initiative (CITI) in Kozhikode was organized. The CITI includes representatives of the Malabar Chamber of Commerce, Calicut Forum for IT (CAFIT), IIM-Kozhikode, Calicut Management Association, Kerala Builders Forum and NIT-Calicut among others. The name Cyberpark was suggested by the convention.

An appeal was also made to the Calicut Corporation to include the IT Park in the master plan that was being prepared for the city.

At this convention, many companies, including IBS, US Technology, NeST Software and Leela Group offered to set up their units in the Kozhikode IT unit.

By March 2008, official sources pointed out that already over 10 companies have shown interest in starting their organizations in this IT Park.

The Park Centre of Cybercity Kozhikode was formally opened by Industries Minister P.K. Kunhalikuttty on 15 February 2014.

The project is expected to be completed in 2015.

By May 2018 Minister for Labour T.P . Ramakrishnan opened the new company – Infinite Open Source Solutions LLP – in the first warm shell space at Sahya IT building, measuring 7,000 sq.ft space. The Company incubated from Business Incubator TBI-NITC. On the same day, three new companies have also logged into the Smart Business Centre at Sahya – Zinfog Codelabs Pvt. Ltd., Limenzy Technologies Pvt. Ltd. and Ontash India Technologies. Hrishikesh Nair inaugurated the Smart Business Centre.

Cyberpark hosts a number of information technology and IT-enabled services companies in its Sahya building and smart business centers. As of 2026, there are 150+ firms operating in the park. The area under lease has gone up from 8 per cent in 2017–18 to 73 percent in 2020–21. The number of employees is 850. Software exports marked an increase of nearly 390% from ₹3,01,71,390 in 2017–18 to ₹14,76,10,856 in 2019–20. The SEZ approval for Sahya building was pivotal in this growth.

== Expenditure ==
The Government expenditure towards the land acquisition for Cyberpark is estimated to be around 430 million INR and planned spoke-parks in Kannur and Kasaragod are estimated to cost 1.50 billion INR each, spread over a five-year period.

Total investment by the government will exceed 2.50 billion INR over the next two years.
