= Kozhikode North Assembly constituency =

Kerala state legislative assembly constituency in southern India

Kozhikode North
- Constituency No. 27 for the Kerala Legislative Assembly
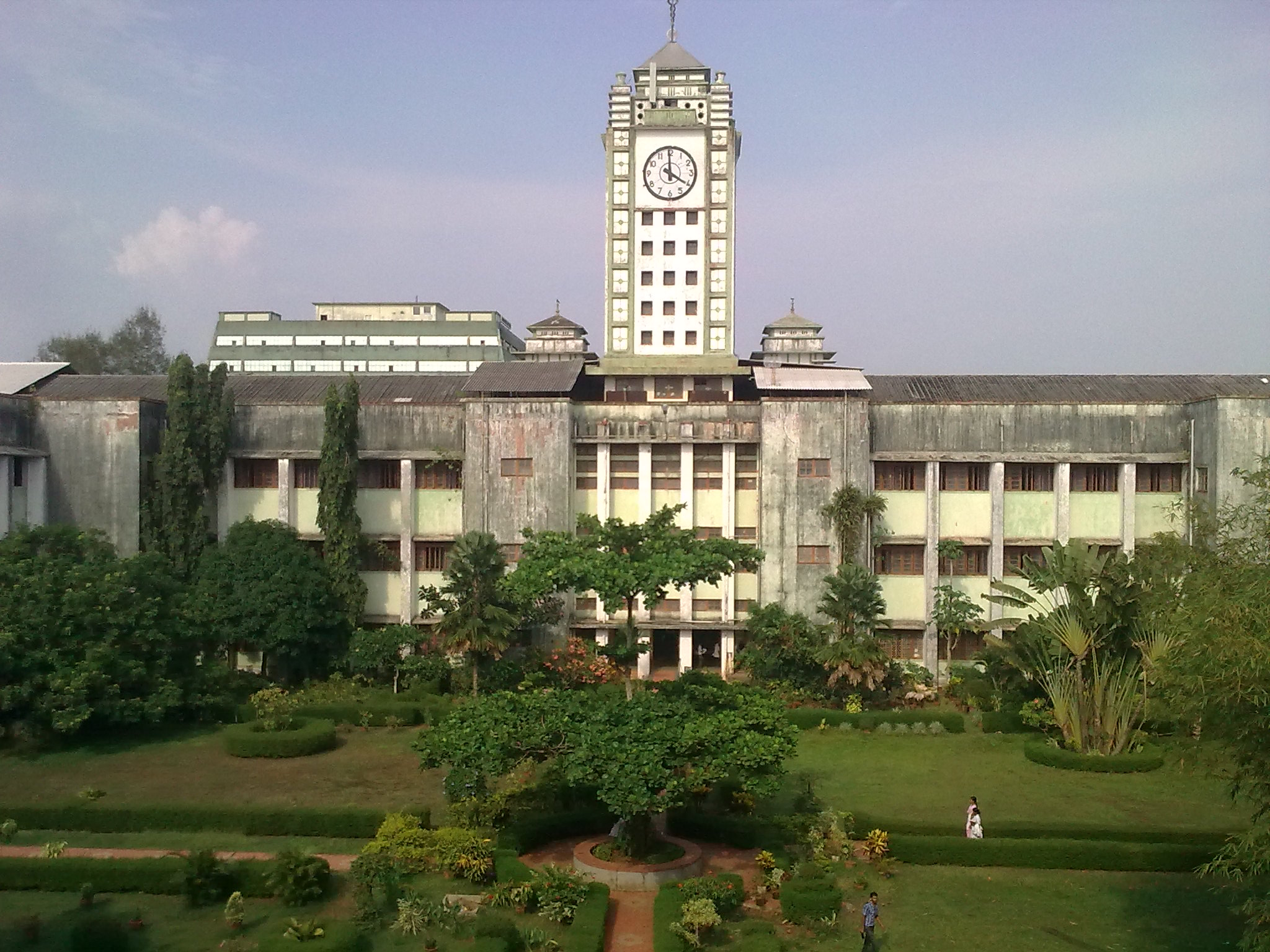
- Government Medical College, Kozhikode is located in Kozhikode North Assembly constituency

Constituency details
- Country: India
- Region: South India
- State: Kerala
- District: Kozhikode
- Established: 2008
- Total electors: 2,20,000 (2026)
- Reservation: None

Member of Legislative Assembly
- 16th Kerala Legislative Assembly
- Incumbent K.Jayanth
- Party: INC
- Alliance: UDF
- Elected year: 2026

Kozhikode North State assembly constituency is one of the 140 state legislative assembly constituencies in Kerala in southern India. It is also one of the seven state legislative assembly constituencies included in Kozhikode Lok Sabha constituency. As of the 2026 Assembly elections, current MLA is K.Jayanth of INC.

Kozhikode North Assembly constituency was established by the 2008 delimitation. Before, it was known as Calicut-I from 1957 to 2008.

== Local self-governed segments ==
Kozhikode North Assembly constituency is composed of the following wards of the Kozhikode Municipal Corporation:

Ward no.	Name	Ward no.	Name
6	Kunduparamba	7	Karuvissery
8	Malaparamba	9	Thadambattuthazham
10	Vengery	11	Maalikadavu
12	Paropady	13	Civil Station
14	Chevarambalam	15	Marikkunnu
16	Moozhikkal	17	Chelavoor
18	Mayanad	19	Medical College South
20	Medical College	21	Chevayur
24	Kudilthode	25	Kottooli
26	Parayanchery	62	Moonnalingal
63	Thiruthiyad	64	Eranhipalam
65	Nadakkavu	66	Vellayil
67	Thoppayil	68	Chakkorathkulam
69	Karaparamba	70	East Hill
71	Athanikkal	72	West Hill
73	Edakkad	74	Puthiyangadi

== Members of Legislative Assembly ==
Key

CPI(M) INC

Election	Niyama Sabha	Member	Party	Tenure
1957	1st	O. T. Sharada Krishnan	Indian National Congress	1957 – 1960
1960	2nd	O. T. Sharada Krishnan	Indian National Congress	1960 – 1965
1967	3rd	P. C. R. Nair	Communist Party of India	1967 – 1970
1970	4th	P. V. Sankaranarayanan	Indian National Congress	1970 – 1977
1977	5th	K. Chandrasekhara Kurup	Communist Party of India	1977 – 1980
1980	6th	K. Chandrasekhara Kurup	Communist Party of India	1980 – 1982
1982	7th	K. Chandrasekhara Kurup	Communist Party of India	1982 – 1987
1987	8th	M. Dasan	Communist Party of India	1987 – 1991
1991	9th	A. Sujanapal	Indian National Congress	1991 – 1996
1996	10th	M. Dasan	Communist Party of India	1996 – 2001
2001	11th	A. Sujanapal	Indian National Congress	2001 – 2006
2006	12th	A. Pradeepkumar	Communist Party of India	2006 – 2011
2011	13th	A. Pradeepkumar	Communist Party of India	2011 – 2016
2016	14th	A. Pradeepkumar	Communist Party of India	2016 – 2021
2021	15th	Thottathil Ravindran	Communist Party of India	2021 – 2026
2026	16th	Adv. K Jayanth	Indian National Congress	Incumbent

== Election results ==
Percentage change (±) denotes the change in the number of votes from the immediate previous election.

=== 2026 ===
2026 Kerala Legislative Assembly election: Kozhikode North
Party	Candidate	Votes	%	±%
INC	Adv K. Jayanth	50,636	35.78	▲2.20
CPI(M)	Thottathil Ravindran	49,153	34.73	▼8.25
BJP	Navya Haridas	39,899	28.19	▲5.69
NOTA	None of the above	667	0.47	▲0.09
Margin of victory		1,483	1.05	
Turnout		1,41,535		
INC gain from CPI(M)		Swing		

=== 2021 ===
There were 1,80,909 registered voters in Kozhikode North Assembly constituency for the 2021 Kerala Assembly election.

2021 Kerala Legislative Assembly election: Kozhikode North
Party	Candidate	Votes	%	±%
CPI(M)	Thottathil Ravindran	59,124	42.98	▼5.42
INC	K. M. Abhijith	46,196	33.58	▲6.19
BJP	M. T. Ramesh	30,952	22.50	▼0.02
NOTA	None of the above	516	0.38	▼0.20
Margin of victory		12,928	9.39	▼11.62
Turnout		1,37,562	76.03	▼2.09
CPI(M) hold		Swing	▼5.42	

=== 2016 ===
There were 1,69,752 registered voters in Kozhikode North Assembly constituency for the 2016 Kerala Assembly election.

2016 Kerala Legislative Assembly election: Kozhikode North
Party	Candidate	Votes	%	±%
CPI(M)	A. Pradeepkumar	64,192	48.40	▼0.72
INC	P. M. Suresh Babu	36,319	27.39	▼13.91
BJP	K. P. Sreesan	29,860	22.52	▲14.01
NOTA	None of the above	770	0.58	−
BSP	K. P. Velayudhan	457	0.34	▲0.14
SDPI	Abdul Vahid	351	0.26	−
SUCI(C)	S. Jennifer	208	0.16	▲0.04
Independent	E. Pradeep Kumar Peedikathodi	187	0.14	−
Independent	T. Suresh Babu Kamaladhalam	151	0.11	−
Independent	Abdu Samad	122	0.09	−
Margin of victory		27,873	21.01	▲13.27
Turnout		1,32,617	78.12	▲0.81
CPI(M) hold		Swing	▼0.72	

=== 2011 ===
There were 1,50,4325 registered voters in the constituency for the 2011 election.

2011 Kerala Legislative Assembly election: Kozhikode North
Party	Candidate	Votes	%	±%
CPI(M)	A. Pradeepkumar	57,123	49.12	−
INC	P. V. Gangadharan	48,125	41.38	−
BJP	P. Reghunathan	9,894	8.51	
Independent	Pradeep Kumar	420	0.36	−
Independent	Gangadharan	367	0.32	−
BSP	Looka Joseph	229	0.20	−
SUCI(C)	P. M. Sreekumar	142	0.16	
Margin of victory		8,998	7.74	
Turnout		1,16,300	77.31	
CPI(M) win (new seat)				

== See also ==
- Kozhikode North
- Kozhikode district
- List of constituencies of the Kerala Legislative Assembly
- 2016 Kerala Legislative Assembly election
