= West Hill, Kerala =

West Hill
- Neighbourhood
- West Hill, Kozhikode, Kerala
- Coordinates: 11.2916°N 75.7609°E
- Country: India
- State: Kerala
- District: Kozhikkode
- Elevation: 35.69 m (117.1 ft)

Languages
  - Official: Malayalam, English
  - Speech: Malayalam, English
- Time zone: UTC+5:30 (IST)
- PIN: 673005
- Other Neighbourhoods: Vellayil, Pavangad, Karaparamba
- LS: Kozhikode
- VS: Kozhikode North

West Hill is a suburb of Kozhikode, Kerala in the peninsular India. The main venue for the Kerala State School Arts festival held in January 2023, Vikram Maidan is situated at West Hill.

== Location ==
West Hill is located at an altitude of about 35.69 metres (117.1 ft) above the mean sea level with the geographic coordinates of (11.2916°N 75.7609°E) in Kozhikode.

West Hill, Kerala (Kerala)

== Transport ==
=== Rail transport ===
There is a railway station namely, West Hill railway station, at West Hill, with three platforms where the number of halting trains at this station is ten.

== Education ==
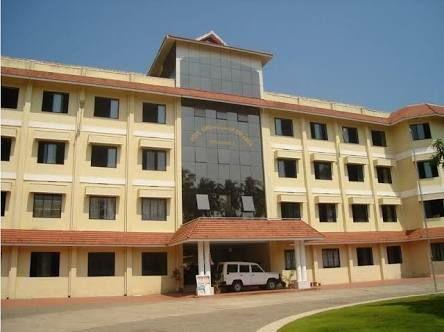
Government Engineering College Kozhikode main block

There is an Engineering College at West Hill viz., Government Engineering College, Kozhikode, run by State Government of Kerala. Also, there is a Government Polytechnic College at West Hill, viz., Kerala Government Polytechnic College where 30 e-autos manufactured by Axeon Ventures, were assembled at its polytechnic workshop and supplied to Kozhikode Corporation for garbage collection and disposal.

== Religion ==
=== Temple ===
Thayatt Ayyappa Temple, a Hindu temple at West Hill is worshipped by devotees of Ayyappan.

=== Church ===
West Hill has a church named St. Antony's Church.

== Barracks ==
There is an Indian (Military) Barracks at West Hill (122 Infantry Battalion (Territorial Army)).
