= Bhaskaran =

Bhaskaran is a Tamil and Malayali masculine given name or a patronymic surname with its origin in Sanskrit meaning "the sun." Notable people with the surname include:

- Bhaskaran Ramprakash (born 1966), Indian cricketer
- K. Bhaskaran, Indian Carnatic music flautist
- M. Bhaskaran, Indian Communist politician
- Nellikode Bhaskaran, Indian Malayalam actor
- P. Bhaskaran (1924–2007), Malayalam poet and film song lyricist
- Vasudevan Baskaran, Indian hockey player
- V. Bhaskaran, Physician

== See also ==
- Boss Engira Bhaskaran, a 2010 Tamil romantic comedy film
- Bhaskar (disambiguation)
- Bhāskara (disambiguation)
- Bhaskararaya
- Bhaskarnagar
