= List of mayors of Kozhikode =

Mayor of Kozhikode
- Incumbent; O Sadashivan since 25 December 2025
- Style: Mr Mayor, Sir
- Appointer: Electorate of Kozhikode
- Formation: Kerala Municipal Corporations Act
- Deputy: Deputy Mayor of Kozhikode; Dr. S Jayasree
- Website: kozhikodecorporation.lsgkerala.gov.in

The mayor of Kozhikode (formerly mayor of Calicut) is the first citizen of the Indian city of Kozhikode (formerly Calicut). The mayor is the chief of the Kozhikode Municipal Corporation.

== Mayor ==
- Manjunatha Rao
- M. Bhaskaran
- A.K. Premajam
- U.T. Rajan
- M.M. Padmavathy
- V.K.C Mohammed Koya
- Thottathil Ravindran
- T.P. Dasan
- Dr. Beena Philip
- Thottathil Raveendran
- Beena Philip
- O Sadashivan
