= Puthiyangadi, Kozhikode =

- Neighbourhood
- Puthiyangadi, Kozhikode, Kerala
- Coordinates: 11.3055°N 75.7619°E
- Country: India
- State: Kerala
- District: Kozhikode
- Elevation: 41.37 m (135.7 ft)

Languages
  - Official: Malayalam, English
  - Speech: Malayalam, English
- Time zone: UTC+5:30 (IST)
- PIN: 673021
- Other Neighbourhoods: West Hill, Vellayil, Pavangad, Karaparamba
- LS: Kozhikkode
- VS: Kozhikode North

Puthiyangadi is a suburb of Kozhikode city between Pavangad, Kozhikode and West Hill, Kerala, India.

== Transportation ==
The national highway passes through Puthiyangadi junction. Goa and Mumbai can be accessed on the northern side and Cochin and Thiruvananthapuram can be accessed on the southern side. Wayanad road connects to Mysore and Bangalore. The nearest railway station is Calicut on Mangalore-Palakkad line. Trains are available to almost all parts of India subject to advance booking over the internet. There are airports at Kannur, Mangalore and Calicut. All of them are international airports but direct flights are available only to Middle Eastern countries.

== Suburbs of Puthiyangadi ==
- Pavangad
- Kunduparamba
- Koya Road
- Palakkada Road
- Paramel VK Road
- Puthiyappa Harbour
- Parakkattil
- Athanikkal

== Important Landmarks ==
- Cheenadath Palli
- Alharamain English School, Kunduparamba
- Puthiyangadi Juma Masjidh
- All India Radio, Kunduparamba
- Radio Mango (First Private Radio Station in Kerala)
- Varakkal Makham
- M.E.S Raja Residential School
- Puthiyappa Temple
- Theruvath Juma Masjid
- Ayyan's World (All kerala Fireworks Distributor).

== See also ==
- Pazhayangadi
- Ettammal
