= Bhaskar =

Bhaskar means light or the moon

== In people ==
- Bhāskara I (c. 600 – c. 680), Indian mathematician, Bhaskaracharya
- Bhaskara II (1114–1185), Indian mathematician and astronomer
- Bhaskar Ram Kolhatkar (d. 1744), 18th century Maratha general of the Kingdom of Nagpur

=== Given name ===
- Bhaskarbuwa Bakhale (1869–1922), Indian classical vocalist
- Bhaskar Chandavarkar (1936–2009), Indian sitar player
- Bhaskar Chandavarkar (1936–2009), Indian sitar player
- Bhaskar Jyoti Mahanta (born: 1963), Indian police officer
- Bhaskar Menon, music industry executive of Indian origin
- Bhaskar Pramanik, present Chairman of Microsoft India
- Bhaskar Sunkara, American publisher
- Bhaskar Ramchandra Tambe (1874–1941), Marathi poet from India

=== Surname ===
- Bommarillu Bhaskar, known mononymically as Bhaskar, Indian Telugu film director
- K. Vijaya Bhaskar, Indian Telugu film director
- Kola Bhaskar, Indian film editor
- M. Bhaskar, also known as Oscar Movies Bhaskar, Indian Tamil film director & producer
- M. S. Baskar, Indian actor
- Roy Bhaskar, British philosopher
- Sanjeev Bhaskar, British comedian and actor
- V. Bhaskar, Indian economist
- Vijaya Bhaskar, Kannada music director

== Other uses ==
- Dainik Bhaskar, a Hindi-language daily newspaper of India, website bhaskar.com
- Bhaskar Group, an Indian business conglomerate
- Bhaskar (Indian werewolf character), fictional character played by Varun Dhawan in the 2022 Indian film Bhediya, based on the legendary Yapum from Arunachal Pradesh

== See also ==
- Bhāskara (disambiguation)
- Bhaskar Nagar, a village in the state of Andhra Pradesh, India
- Bhaskar Bharti, a television serial that airs on Sony Entertainment Television
- Divya Bhaskar, a Gujarati-language daily newspaper of India
- Bhaskar Jagannathan syndrome, a genetic disorder
