= Nadakkavu =

Kozhikode Nadakkavu
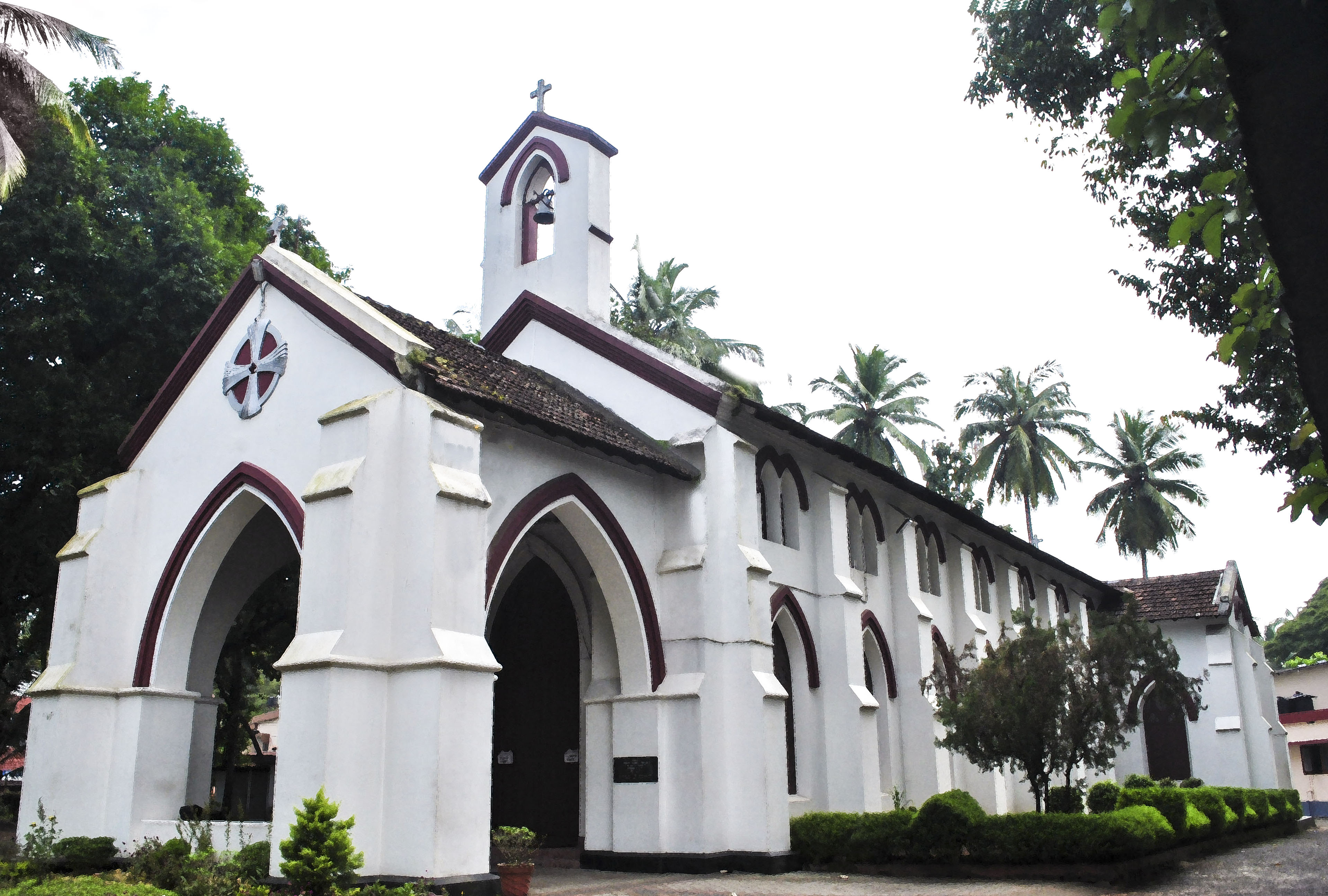
- St.Mary's English Church, Nadakkavu
- Interactive map of Kozhikode Nadakkavu
- Coordinates: 11.27126°N 75.77953°E
- Country: India
- State: Kerala

Nadakkavu is a commercial and residential locality of Kozhikode city. Among the locals, they usually refer and divide Nadakkavu into two, East Nadakkavu and West Nadakkavu. It is about three to four kilometers from the city center. Areas like Chakkorath Kulam, Vandipettah, and Bilathikkulam are part of Nadakkavu.

The suburb of Nadakkavu is further connected to West Hill area with the government guest house, Government Engineering College Kozhikode and the Government polytechnic situated inside the locality. There is a helipad in Vikram Maidhan West Hill and the road to the beach is called Bhatt Road. The road to the north takes you to Puthiyangadi, Pavangad, Kozhikode, Elathur and Koyilandy.

There is an Autism Centre on Nadakkavu cross road.

There are a lot of schools in Nadakkavu.

== Transport ==
The road from Mananchira to the north of city connects directly to Nadakkavu suburb. The offices of Malayala Manorama newspaper and Chandrika newspaper are located here. The ancient English Church and Panicker Road are connected to Nadakkavu on the beach side. On the northern side of the Nadakkavu town, the office of the Post Master General and the C.H.Mosque Eranhipalam are located. Eranhipalam is connected to Nadakkavu by the Kottaram Road which diverts to form the U.G.Nayak Road near the Homeo Hospital. The road going to the east from Homeo Hospital takes you to Jawahar Nagar near Sarovaram Bio Park.

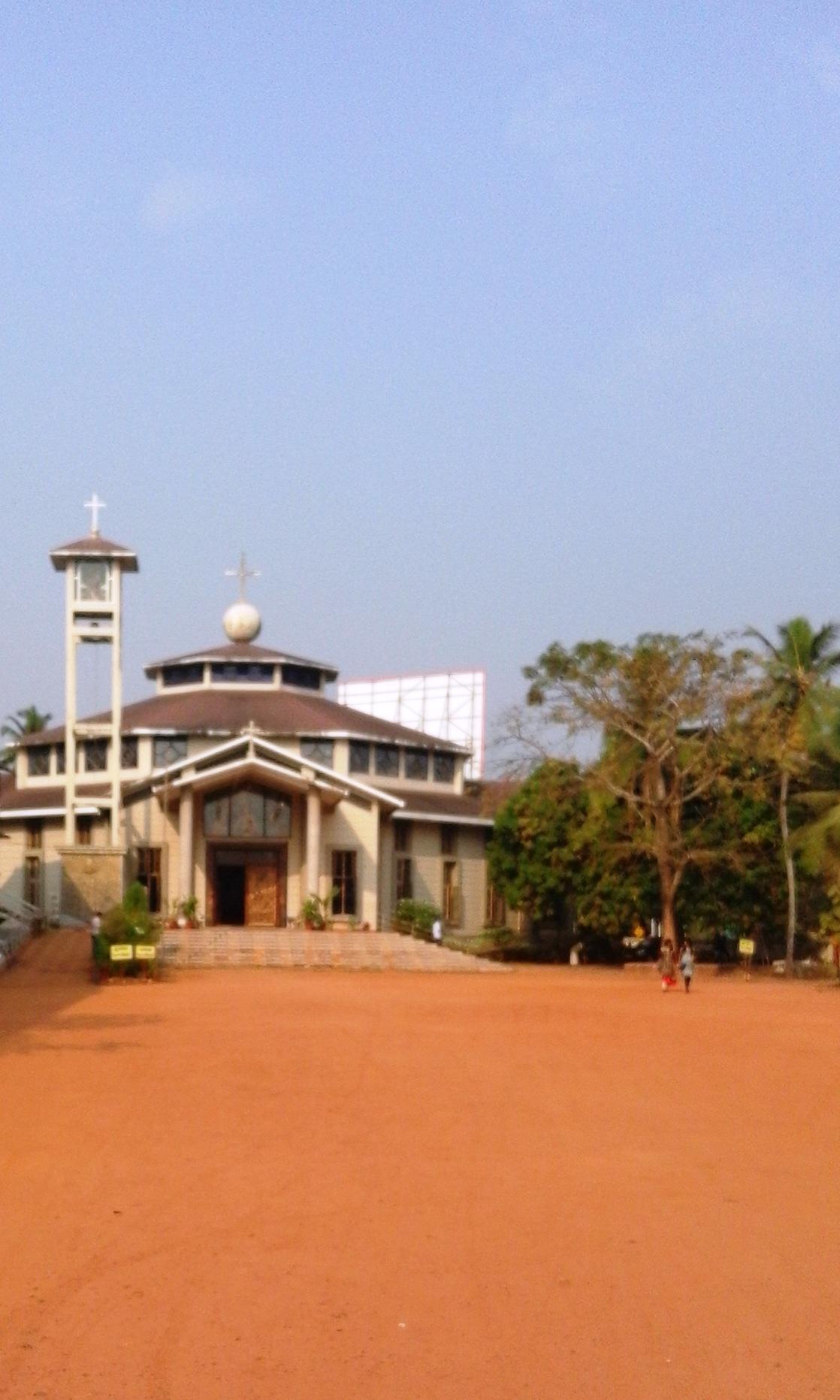
St.Joseph Church, Panikker Road Junction

== See also ==
- Eranhippalam
- Karaparamba
- West Hill, Kozhikode
- Pavangad, Kozhikode
