= Thottathil Ravindran =

Indian politician

Thottathil Ravindran MLA
- തോട്ടത്തിൽ രവീന്ദ്രൻ
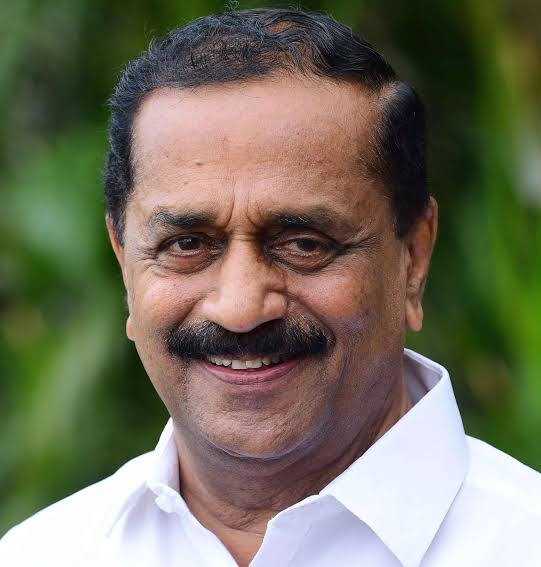

Member of the Kerala Legislative Assembly for Kozhikode North
- In office 3 May 2021 – 23 May 2026
- Preceded by: A. Pradeepkumar
- Succeeded by: K.Jayanth

Mayor of Kozhikode Corporation
- In office May 2016 – November 2020
- Preceded by: V.K.C Mammed Koya
- Succeeded by: Dr. Beena Philip

Chairman of Guruvayur Devaswom Board
- In office 2007–2011

Mayor of Kozhikode Corporation
- In office 2000–2005

Deputy Mayor of Kozhikode Corporation
- In office 1995–2000

Personal details
- Born: 14 April 1947 (age 79) Kozhikode, Kerala, India
- Party: Communist Party of India (Marxist)
- Spouse: Valsala T
- Occupation: Business

Thottathil Ravindran is an Indian politician who served as the MLA of Kozhikode North constituency from May 2021 to May 2026. Previously he was mayor of Kozhikode corporation from 2016 to 2020.

== Political life ==
Thottathil Ravindran is one of the senior most and popular leaders of Communist Party of India (Marxist) in Kozhikode. He joined the party in 1968. Currently, he is a member of the CPI(M) Bilathikulam local committee and a member of Kerala Karshaka Sangham Kozhikode North area committee.

Known for his clean image, Ravindran was the first mayor to complete the full five-year term in office (2000–2005) since the formation of the Kozhikode Corporation in 1962. He also had a stint as Deputy Mayor during the 1995–2000 period and for a brief term of one month as Mayor in-charge in 1998. Kozhikode Corporation won the state government's Swaraj trophy for the best corporation in the state during his first reign as the mayor of the city. In 2016 again, he was elected as the Mayor of Kozhikode Municipal Corporation. Corporation's EMS Stadium, Kudumbashree waste management Project, She Lodge, ABC Center for the Sterilization of Stray Dogs at Poolakkadavu, implementation of corporation's online system for building construction related services, Kalluthankadavu flat construction, escalator cum foot overbridge near the Moffusal bus stand etc.are some of the notable projects completed by the Kozhikode Corporation during the reign of Thottathil Ravindran.

Ravindran was also the chairman of Guruvayur Devaswom Board from 2007 to 2011. It was during his time the management changed the centuries-old dress code, allowing women to wear churidars to enter the Guruvayur Temple.

In 2021 Kerala Legislative Assembly election he has been elected from Kozhikode North (State Assembly constituency) with a margin of 12,928 votes.

== Personal life ==
Thottathil Ravindran was born on 14 April 1947, in Kozhikode as the youngest son of M.C Appukutti Nair and Thottathil Janaki Amma.

He is married to Valsala. His wife is a retired teacher.
