= Elathur, Kozhikode =

Village in Kozhikode, Kerala, India

Elathur
- city/suburb/part of calicut corporation
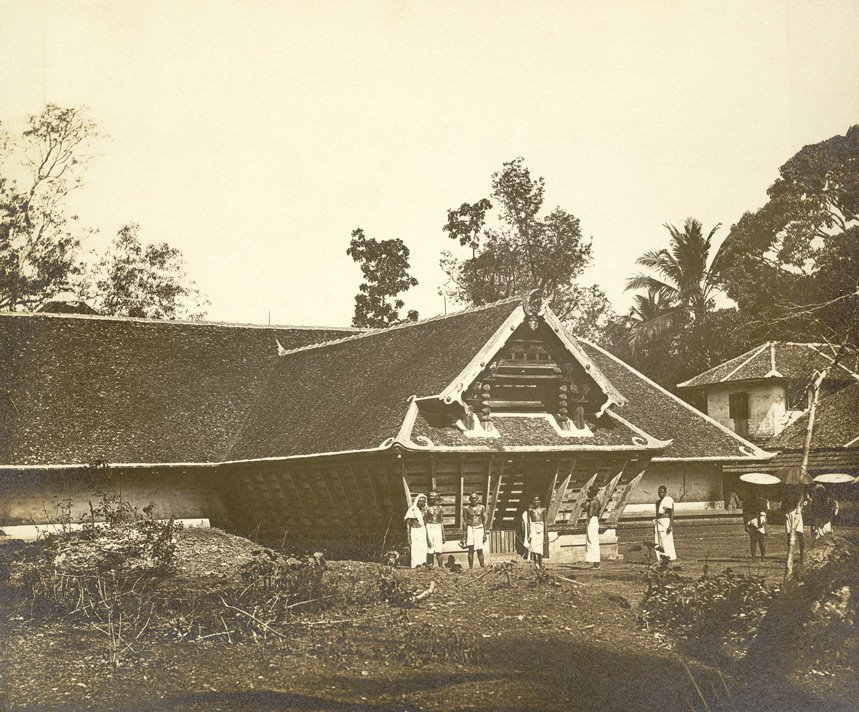
- Elathur Bhagavathy Temple in 1900

- Location in Kerala, India
- Coordinates: 11°20′0″N 75°44′0″E
- Country: India
- State: Kerala
- District: Kozhikode

Population (2001)
  - Total: 41,326

Languages
  - Official: Malayalam, English
- Time zone: UTC+5:30 (IST)
- PIN: 673303
- Telephone code: 0495
- ISO 3166 code: IN-KL

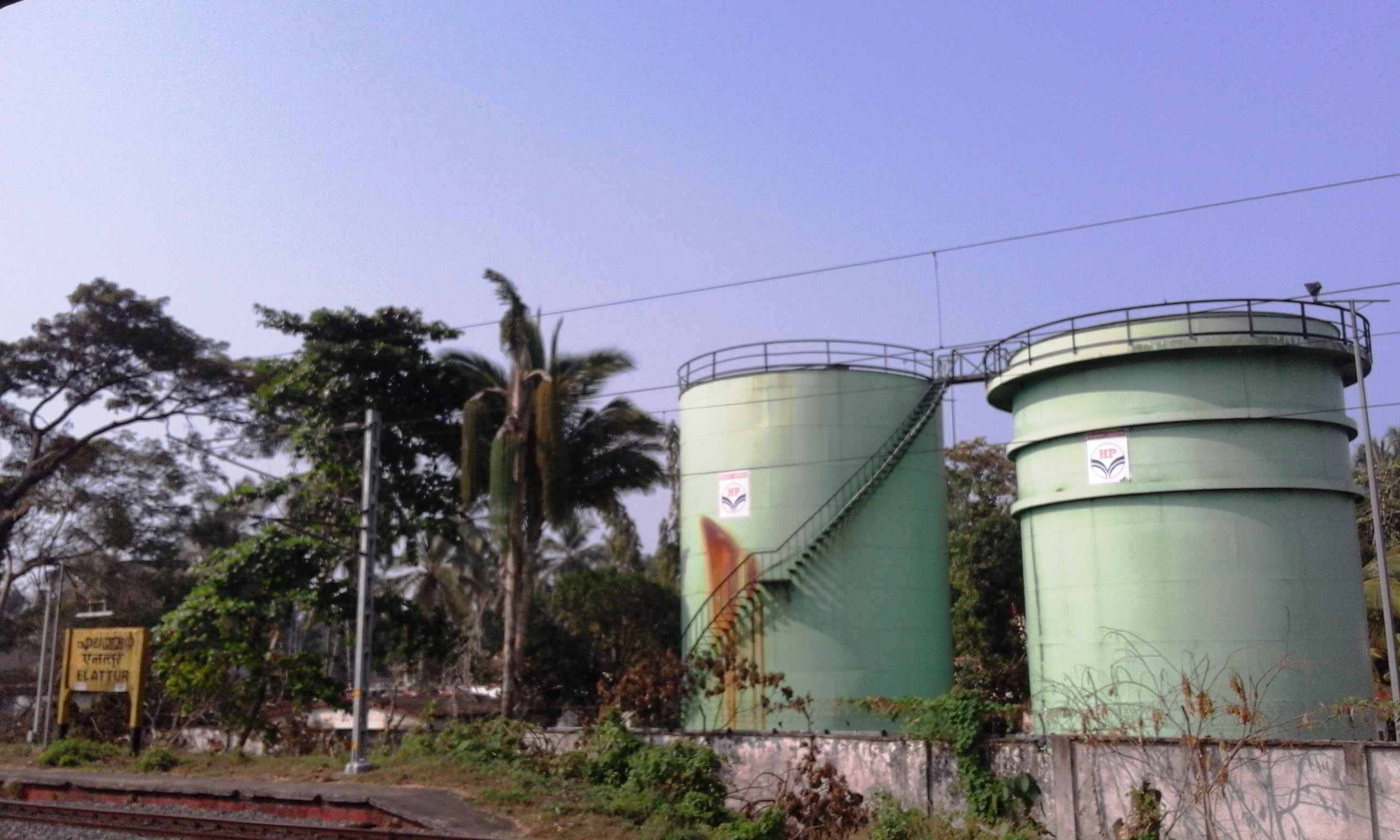
Elathur Railway Station

Elathur is a part of Calicut corporation in Kozhikode district in the Indian state of Kerala. It is located about 12 km north of Kozhikode city on the National Highway 66. It is bounded by the Arabian Sea at the west and Korapuzha River (Elathur River) at the north. The Elathur River is generally considered to be the boundary between the North Malabar and South Malabar in the erstwhile district of Malabar.

At the 2001 census, Elathur panchayat has a population of 41,326 with a nearly equal proportion of Hindus and Muslims. The panchayat covers an area of 13.58 km^{2}, but a major portion of the area has been taken up by National Highway 66, the State highway, rivers and the Indian Railways.

Elathur is well connected by road and rail. The National Highway NH 66 passes through the panchayat. The Elathur railway station is located on the east side of the National Highway. The Kozhikode Regional Office of Hindustan Petroleum is located close to the railway station.

The Arabian Sea lies to the west of Elathur. The Elathur beach stretches from Puthiyanirath to Korapuzha. Marine mussels are abundant in this part of the sea.

Elathur is situated on the northern side of Kozhikode city. City suburbs like Nadakkavu and West Hill, Kozhikode and Puthiyangadi lie on the road to Elathur. The local station of All India Radio (AIR) is situated at Kunduparamba on this route. At the Pavangad junction, the road diverges east to Atholy and the straight road to north goes to Elathur. The Vengaly road over-bridge has solved the traffic issues of the past and after the over-bridge, Elathur is only five kilometers.

== Conolly Canal ==
The historic Conolly Canal named after Henry Valentine Conolly, the collector of Malabar during the erstwhile British regime runs through Elathur. It was constructed during his tenure, in 1848, and was used as a major waterway, shipping goods and ferrying passengers in the Kozhikode district till the late 1950s. The canal links Korapuzha to Kallayi River. The whole network together forms Elathur backwaters.

== Vallikkattu Kavu ==
Vallikkattu Kavu is a 27 acre sacred grove in a swamp at Olayinmal Chikkilode, Edakkara near Elathur. You can see monkeys, peacocks, wild boars, porcupines, wild hens, different kinds of butterflies and numerous species of orchids here. There is a species of herb here which has leaves in the shape of butterflies.

== Suburbs of Elathur ==
- Chungam, Athanikkal and Puthiyangadi
- Pavangad, Puthoor and Vengali
- Puthiyangadi
- Puthiyanirathu and Ananthapuram
- Chettikkulam and Salathnagar
- Thiruvangoor and Kollamgramam
- Anakkulam, Moodadi and Nandigramam
- Korappuzha, Kattilpeedika and Vengalam
- Vettilpara, Pookkad and Chemancheri

== See also ==
- Elathur railway station

== Image Gallery ==
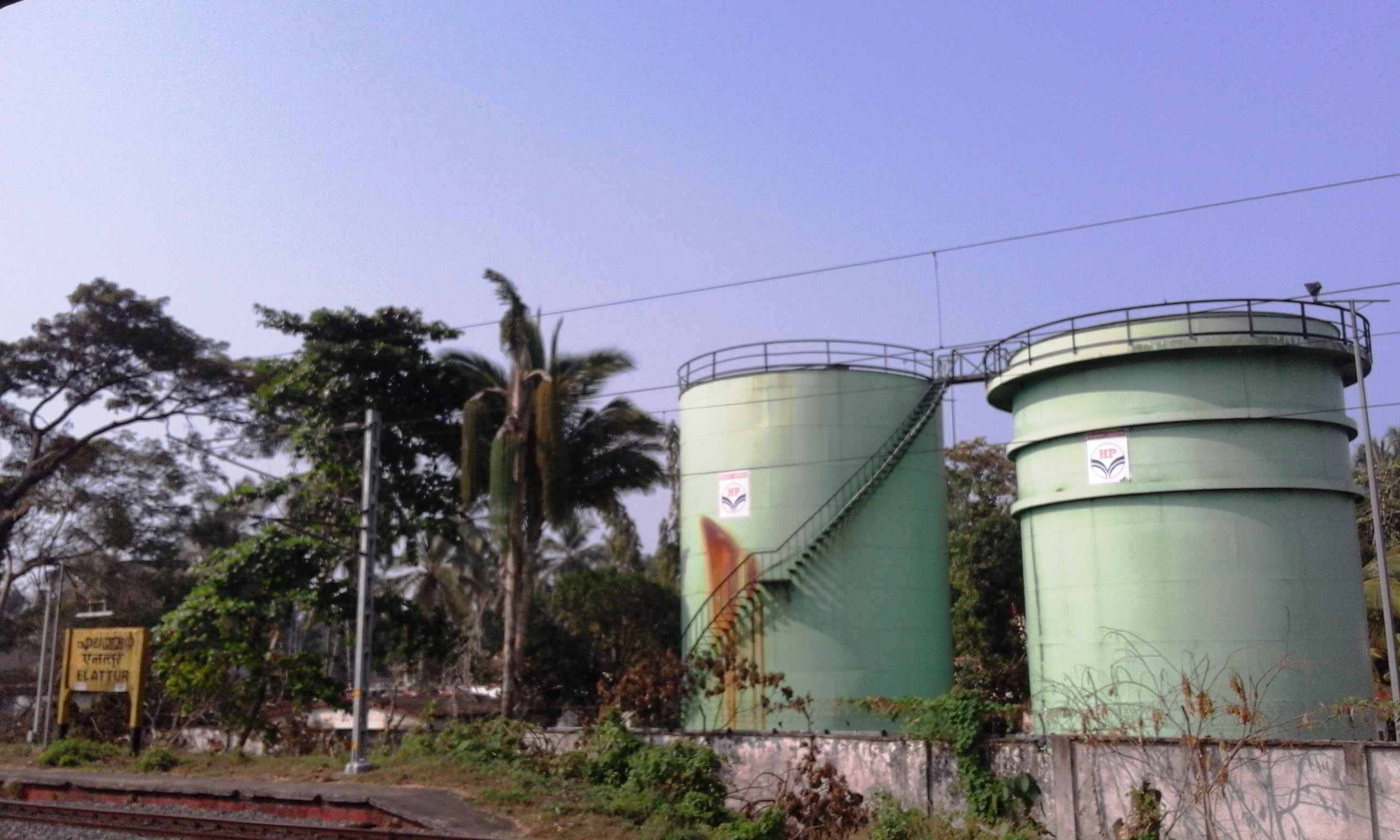
Railway Station

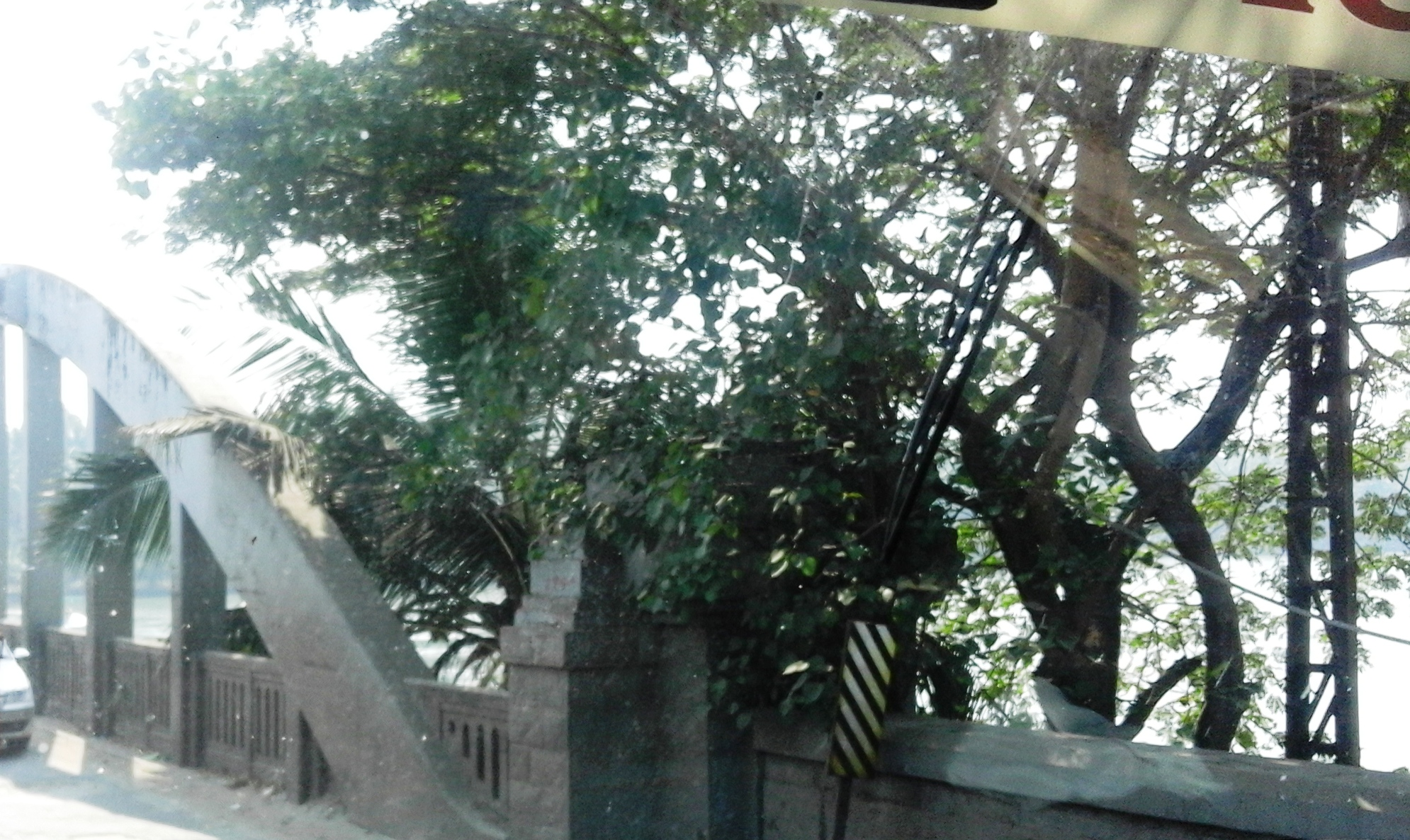
Korappuzha Bridge

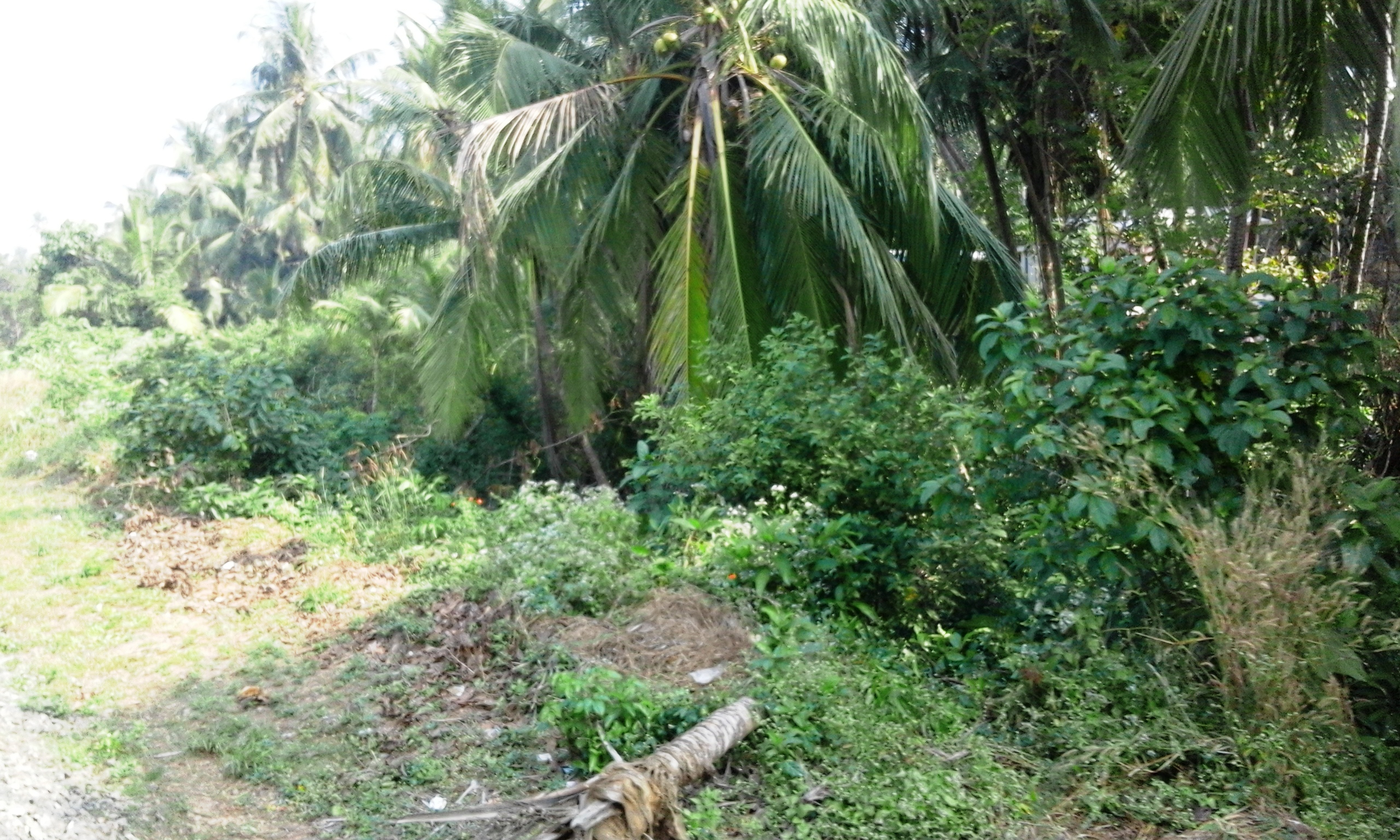
Elathur village

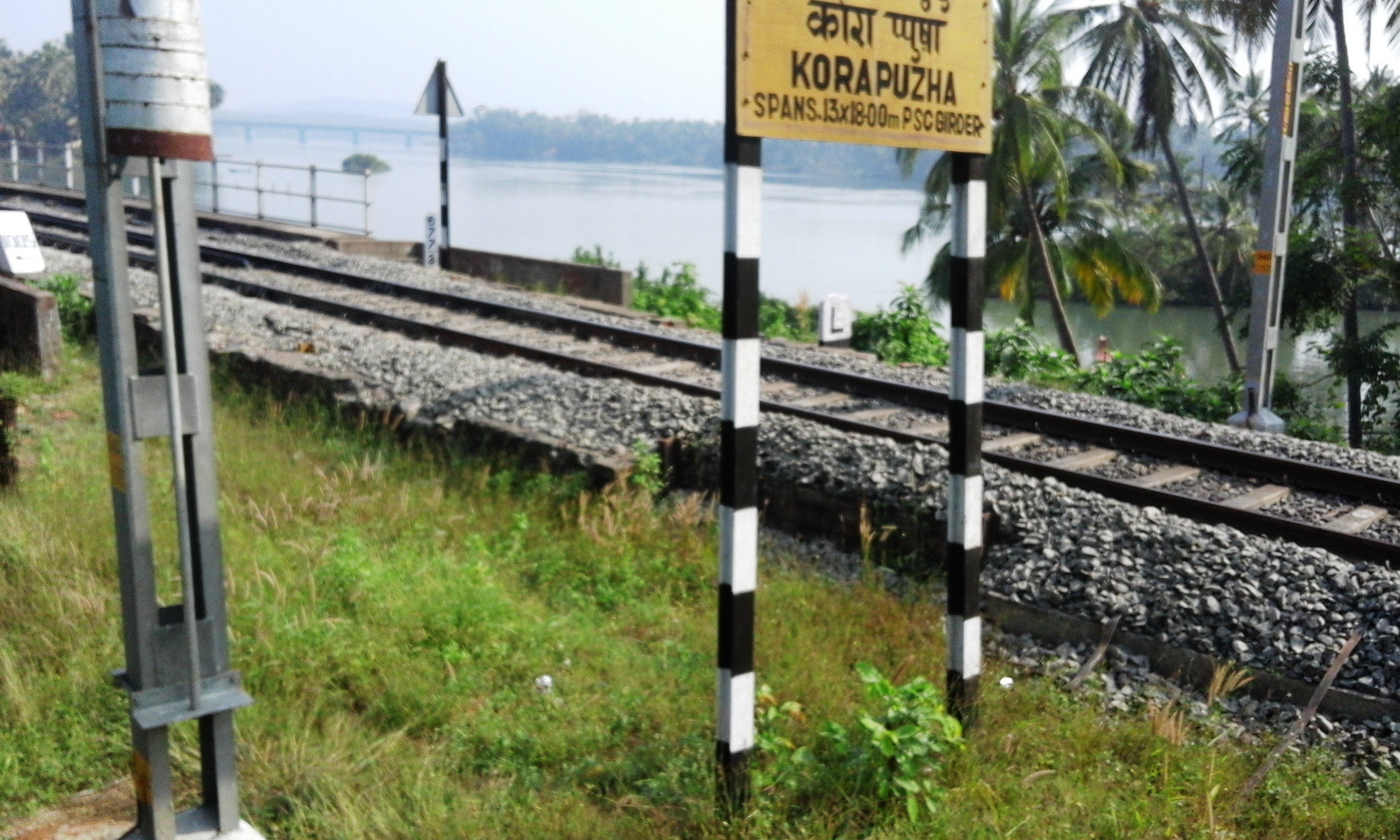
Korappuzha
