= A. Pradeepkumar =

Indian politician

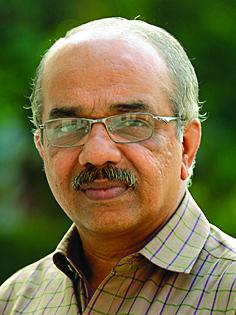
- A. Pradeepkumar

Member of Kerala Legislative Assembly
- In office 2006–2021
- Succeeded by: Thottathil Raveendran
- Constituency: Kozhikode North

Political Secretary, Chief Minister of Kerala
- In office incumbent
- Preceded by: KK Rakesh

Personal details
- Born: 15 May 1964 (age 61)
- Party: Communist Party of India (Marxist)
- Spouse: Akhila P. K.
- Children: Amitha

A. Pradeepkumar was a member of 12th, 13th and 14th Kerala Legislative Assembly from Kozhikode (North) constituency. He is a member of the Kerala state committee of Communist Party of India (Marxist).

== Personal life ==
Son of Shri Gopalakrishna Kurup and Smt. Kamalakshi, born at Chelakkad, Nadapuram in Vadakara Taluk on 15 May 1964. He is married to Smt. Akhila P.K. and has one daughter, Amitha. He resides at Neelambari, West Hill, Kozhikode. He has been selected for an honorary fellowship of the Indian Institute of Architects (IIA). He’s the first politician and person from Kerala to receive this distinction.

== Political life ==
Entered politics during school days through S.F.I.; was Secretary, S.F.I., Kozhikode Zamorin's Guruvayoorappan College Unit (1984–86); Chairman, Calicut University Union; Member, Calicut University Senate (1986–87); Secretary, S.F.I. Kozhikode District Committee (1988–90); State President (1990-92), State Secretary and All India Vice-President, S.F.I. (1992–94); Kozhikode District President and Secretary, State Joint Secretary (2000–03), State Secretary, All India Joint Secretary (2003–07), D.Y.F.I.; Member, Kozhikode District Committee and State Committee, CPI(M); Member, Kozhikode District Council; President, Calicut Co-operative Urban Bank (1998-2003); President, Kozhikode District Football Association; Executive Member, District Sports Council, Kozhikode (2003–07); Member, Kerala State Sports Council (2006–09).

Kerala Legislative Assembly Election
Year	Constituency	Closest Rival	Majority (Votes)	Won/Lost
2006	Kozhikode North	Adv. A. Sujanapal (INC)	7695	Won
2011	Kozhikode North	P.V Gangadharan (INC)	8998	Won
2016	Kozhikode North	Adv. P M Suresh Babu (INC)	27873	Won

Parliamentary Election
Year	Constituency	Closest Rival	Majority (Votes)	Won/ Lost
2019	Kozhikode	M.K.Raghavan (INC)	85760	Lost
