= Farshad Fatemi =

Iranian economist (born 1973)

Seyed Farshad Fatemi Ardestani
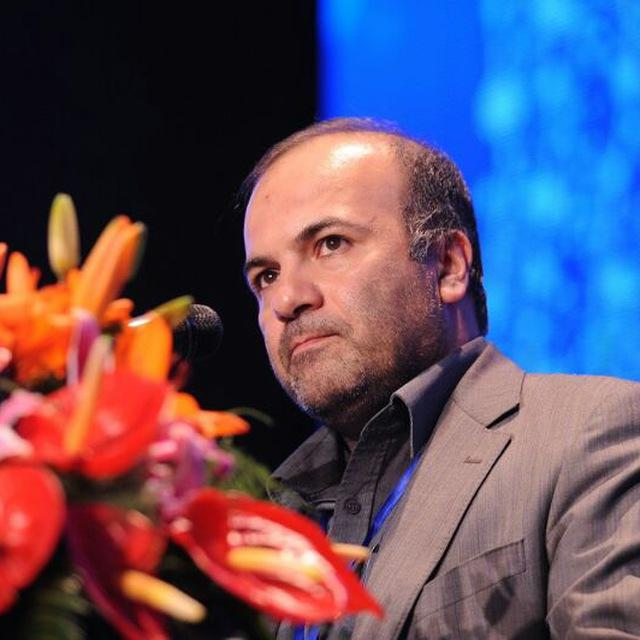
- Born: 15 May 1973 (age 52); Ardestan, Isfahan, Iran
- Education: University College London, Economics (PhD) IRPD, Socio-economic Systems (MSc) Isfahan University of Technology, Electrical Engineering (BSc)
- Children: Seyed Hossein Fatemi (3, May, 1998) Seyed Mohammad Ali Fatemi (5, August, 2006) Seyed Ali Fatemi (25, April, 2015)
- Scientific career
- Fields: Game theory, Industrial organization
- Institutions: Sharif University of Technology
- Thesis: Essays in industrial organisation (2009)
- Doctoral advisor: V. Bhaskar and Rachel Griffith
- Website: http://gsme.sahrif.edu/~ffatemi

Seyed Farshad Fatemi Ardestani (born 15 May 1973, Ardestan) is an Iranian economist and a member of Iranian National Competition Council. He is Associate Professor of Economics and Vice President for Administration and Finance at Sharif University of Technology. Fatemi is known for his works on game theory and industrial organization.
