= M. Dasan =

Indian politician

Member of the Kerala Legislative Assembly
- In office 1987–1991
- Preceded by: K. Chandrasekhara Kurup
- Succeeded by: A. Sujanapal
- Constituency: Kozhikode North
- In office 1996–2001
- Preceded by: A. Sujanapal
- Succeeded by: A. Sujanapal
- Constituency: Kozhikode North

Personal details
- Born: January 1, 1953 Kozhikode, Kerala
- Died: 29 June 2002 (aged 49) Kozhikode, Kerala
- Spouse: P. Sathidevi
- Children: 1

M. Dasan was a social activist, trade unionist and Communist Party of India (Marxist) politician from Kerala, India. He represented Kozhikode North Assembly constituency in 8th and 10th Kerala Legislative Assembly.

== Biography ==
M. Dasan was born on January 1, 1953, in Thelyankara, Kozhikode district, the son of Kanaran and Cheeru. He studied at Chorod UP School and Madappally Government High School.

=== Personal life and death ===
Dasan and his wife P. Sathidevi have one daughter. He died on June 29, 2002, at the age of 49, at a private hospital in Kozhikode.

== Political career ==
=== Electoral politics ===
Dasan represented Kozhikode North Assembly constituency in 8th and 10th Kerala Legislative Assembly.

=== Trade unionism ===
After studies, Dasan started his career as a weaver. He became active in the Weavers' Union and became the Vadakara Taluk secretary of the union. He was later appointed state president of the Kerala Water Authority Employees Union (CITU).

=== Party career ===
When DYFI was formed, he became its district president and later elected state president in 1983 and state secretary in 1986. He also served as the DYFI all India vice president for 8 years.

Dasan joined the Communist Party of India (Marxist) in 1972 and was elected to the party's Kozhikode district committee in 1987 and State Committee in 1988. Dasan, who took part in many struggles and led many struggles, participated in the surplus land agitation in Kerala and was imprisoned.

== Legacy ==
M Dasan Institute of Technology (M-DIT) Kozhikode, a venture of M. Dasan Memorial Co-operative Institute of Engineering and Information Technology was named after him.
