= A. K. Premajam =

Indian politician

A. K. Premajam എ.കെ. പ്രേമജം

Member of Lok Sabha
- In office 1998–2004
- Preceded by: O. Bharatan
- Succeeded by: P. Satheedevi
- Constituency: Vatakara

Personal details
- Born: 12 August 1938 (age 87) Pallikkunnu, Kannur, Kerala
- Party: Communist Party of India (Marxist)
- Spouse: K. Ravindranath
- Children: Two

A. K. Premajam (born 12 August 1938) is an Indian Parliamentarian and social worker.

== Early life and education ==
A. K. Premajam was born in Pallikkunnu, Kannur, Kerala. She was educated in Providence College under Calicut University, Government Brennen College, Thalassery under Madras University and University College under Kerala University. She has a master's degree in arts. She started her career as a teacher. She was the Principal of Government Arts College, Kozhikode from 1991 to 1994.

== Political career ==
A.K Premajam started her political career as the Mayor of Kozhikode. holding the office from 1995 to 1998, and then from 2010 to 2015. She was elected to the 12th Lok Sabha in 1998 and to the 13th Lok Sabha in 1999. She was the member of the Essential Committee on Food, Joint Committee on the Empowerment of Women and Consultative Committee of the Ministry of Food and Consumer Affairs during her tenure as the Member of Parliament. She is the Member of Central Committee, All India Democratic Women's Association.
