= P. Sathidevi =

Indian politician

Chairperson of Kerala Women's Commission
- Incumbent
- Assumed office 1 October 2021
- Preceded by: M. C. Josephine

Member of Parliament, Lok Sabha
- In office 2004 – 2009
- Preceded by: A. K. Premajam
- Succeeded by: Mullappally Ramachandran
- Constituency: Vatakara

Personal details
- Born: 29 November 1956 (age 69) Thalassery, Kannur, Kerala, India
- Party: Communist Party of India (Marxist)
- Spouse: M. Dasan (m. 1984; died 2002)
- Education: Bachelor of Laws
- Alma mater: Government Law College, Kozhikode
- Profession: Advocate
- As of 23 September, 2006

P. Sathidevi (born 29 November 1956) is an Indian politician and was a member of the 14th Lok Sabha of India.

== Life ==
She was born in 1956 to Kunhiraman and Deviamma. In 1984, she married M. Dasan.

She represented Vatakara constituency of Kerala and is a member of the CPI(M). She is serving as the chairperson of Kerala Women's Commission since 1 October 2021. She is now selected as Central Committee Member of CPI(M).
