= Moozhikkal =

Coordinates: 11.29769°N 75.83313°E

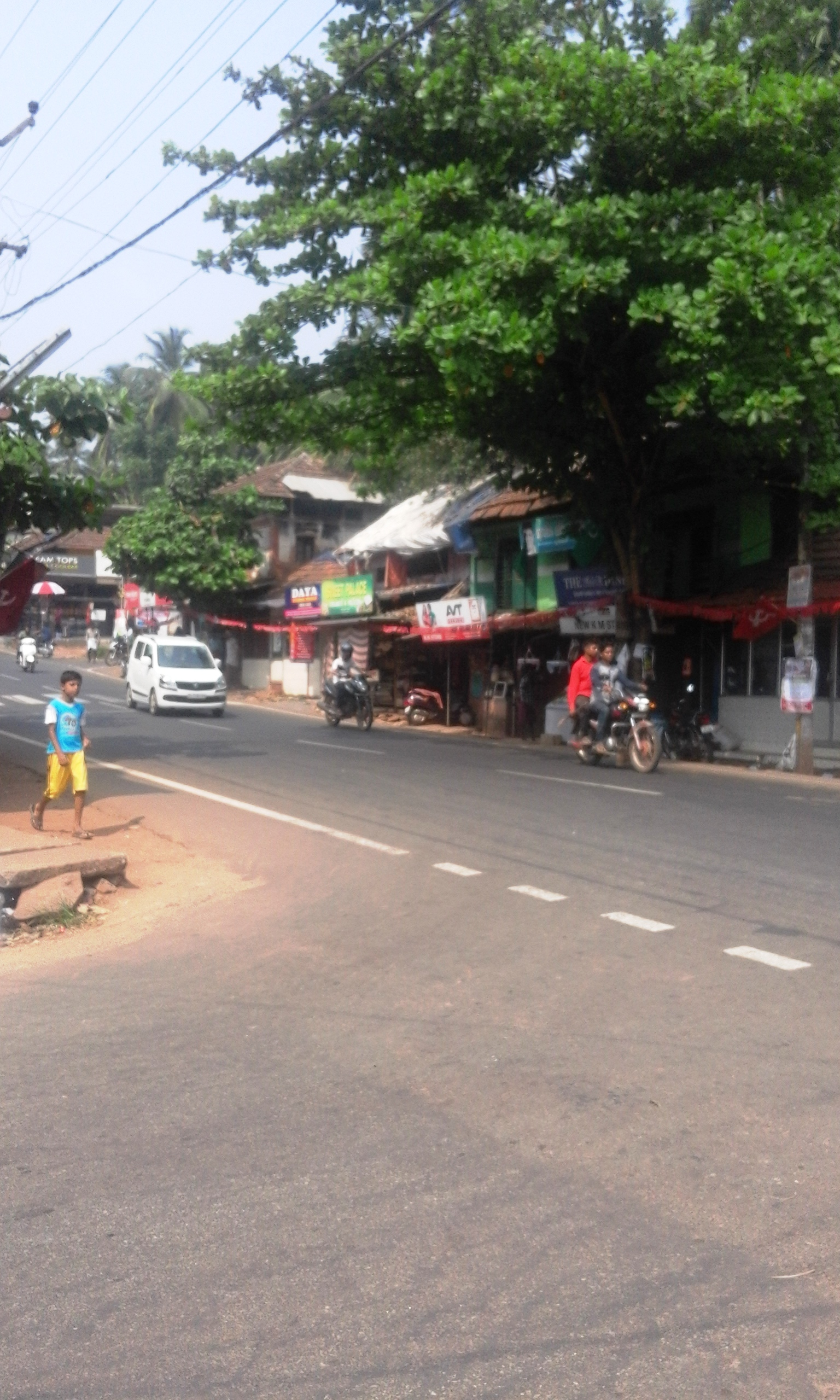
Moozhikkal junction, Kozhikode

Moozhikkal is a small town on Wayanad Road in Kozhikode East, Kerala, India. Moozhikkal is administered by Kozhikode Corporation, the local city council.

== Important Landmarks ==
- Jama'at Juma musjid
- Moozhikkal "Srambya" Historical Significant Mosque
- Moozhikkal market

Moozhikkal is a residential and commercial locality in the eastern part of Kozhikode (Calicut), Kerala. It lies along the busy Wayanad Road (NH 766) and forms an important junction connecting Kozhikode city with the Medical College area and the route towards Wayanad

== Medical College Road ==
Moozhikkal junction forks to Calicut Medical College and Parambil Bazar areas.

== Indian Institute of Spices Research ==
The Indian Institute of Spices Research was established in 1975. This organization is a subsidiary of Indian Council of Agricultural Research, a federal agency of the government of India. The institute provides project based education at masters and doctorate levels. Ph.D. is offered in biochemistry, botany, horticulture, hematology and soil chemistry. The institute has a number of fully equipped labs.
