= Vellayil =

Kozhikode Vellayil
- Interactive map of Kozhikode Vellayil
- Coordinates: 11.27252°N 75.76567°E
- Country: India
- State: Kerala

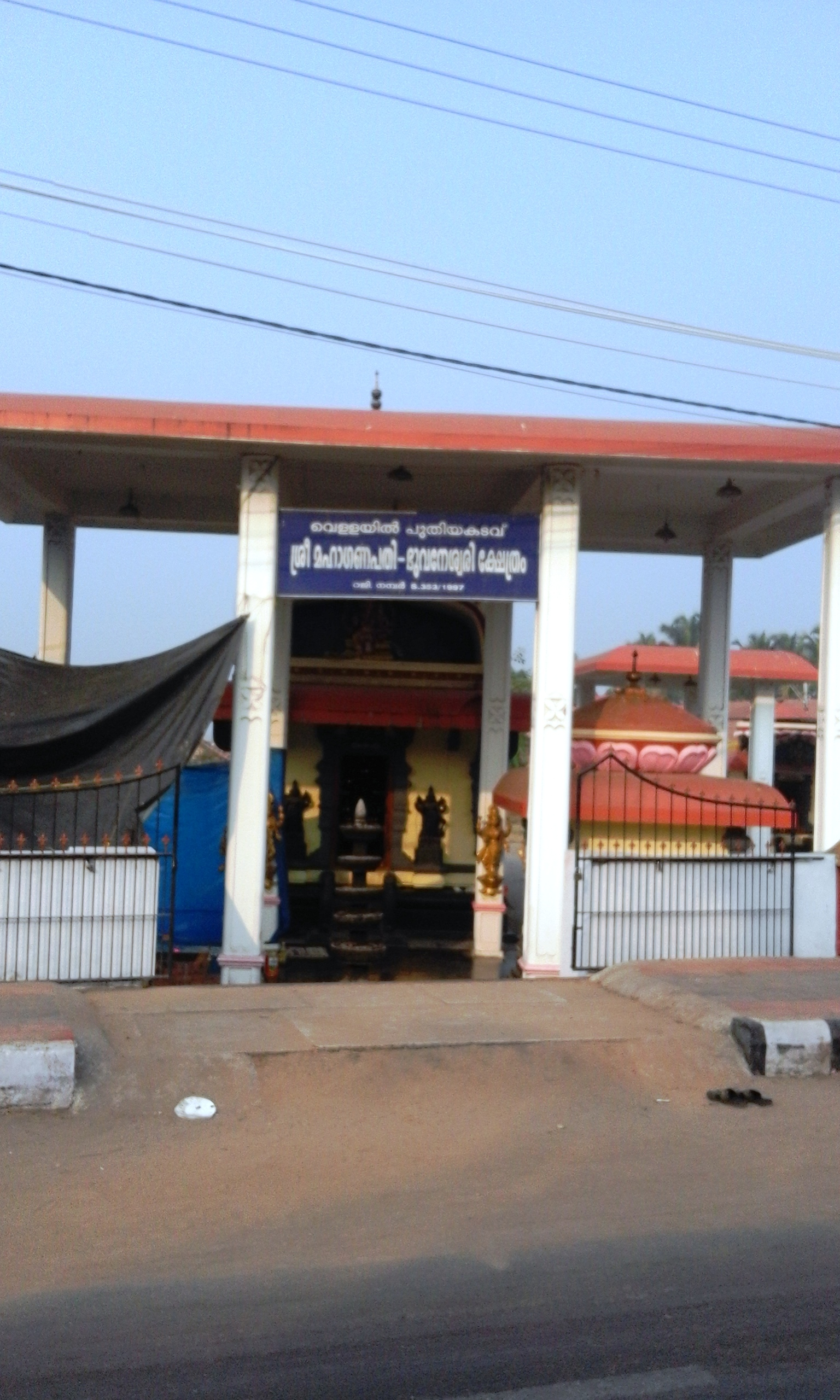
Vellayil Puthiyakadavu Ganapathy Temple on the beach

Vellayil is a beach on the northern side of Kozhikode city. The beach road from Chakkum Kadavu bridge runs all the way to Vellayil in the north. The facilities of the fisheries department and the Matsyafed Corporation are situated in Vellayil. A slum called Shanthi Nagar is also located here.

Further north of the beach is the Gandhi Nagar Housing Colony and the Bhatt Road that takes you to West Hill on the east. The road near Vellayil Railway Station is called Gandhi Road and it takes you to Nadakkavu town. Other roads connecting the beach to the city are called Joseph Road, P.T.Usha Road, Red Cross Road and Major Santhosh Road.

== Beaches in Vellayil ==
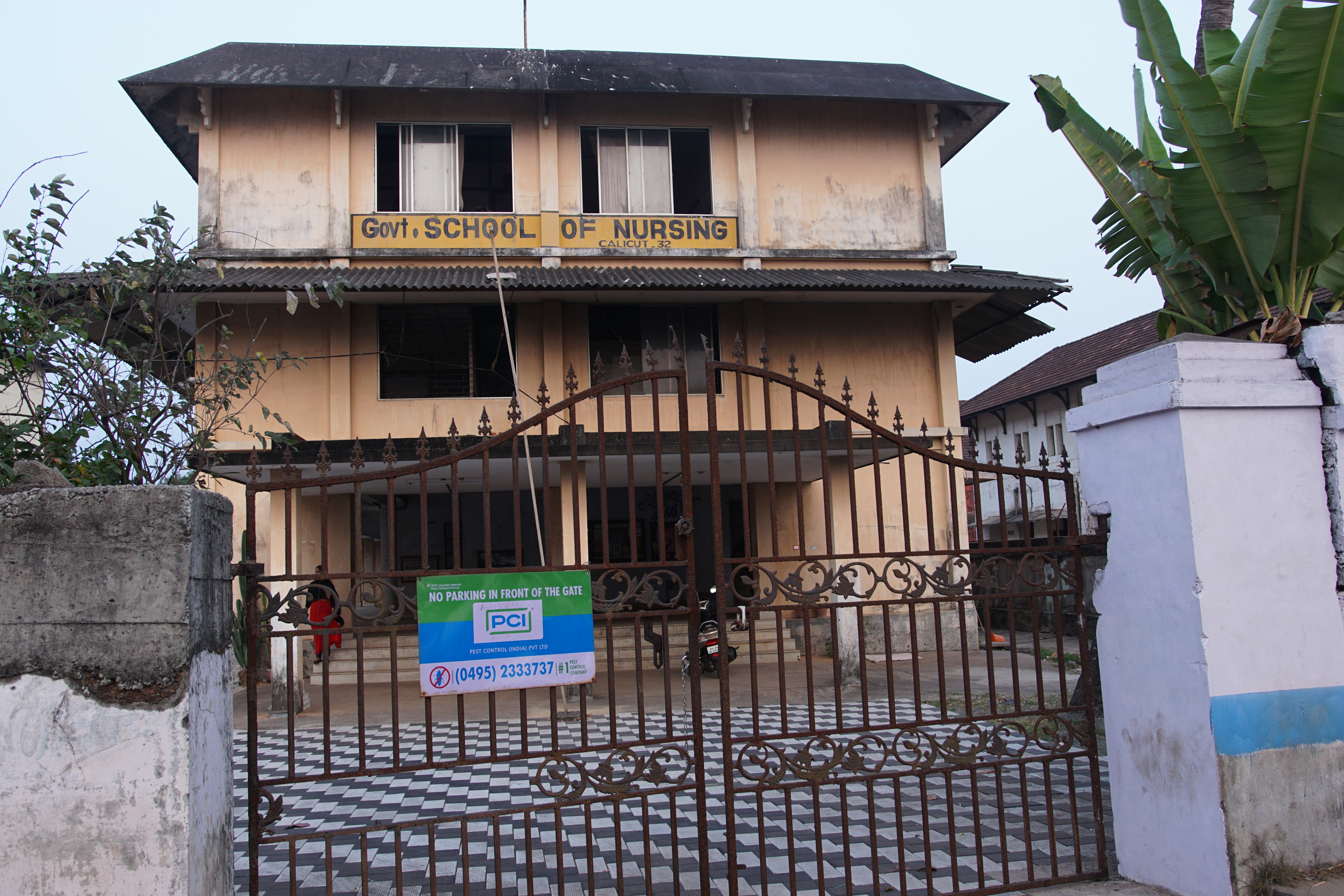
Government school of nursing

- Varakkal, Bhatt Road and Puthiyappa
- Puthiyanirathu, Anandapuram and Chettikkulam
- Kottedath bazar, Elathur and Korappuzha

== See also ==
- Kozhikode Beach
- West Hill, Kozhikode
- Nadakkavu
- Elathur
