= Bhāskara =

Bhāskara is an epithet of the Hindu deity of the sun, Surya. It may also refer to:

== People ==
- Bhāskara (Bhedabheda Vedanta), Indian philosopher who was an early figure in the Bhedabheda tradition of Vedanta
- Rao Siddani Bhaskara (born 1943), Indian graph theorist
- Bhāskara I (c. 600 – c. 680), Indian mathematician and commentator
- Bhāskara II (1114–1185), Indian mathematician and astronomer; wrote the Siddhanta Siromani
- Bhaskara (Kashmiri), writer; wrote on the Kashmir Shaivism sect of Hinduism
- Bhaskararaya (1690–1785), Indian writer; wrote on the worship of the Mother Goddess in Hinduism
- Bhaskara Sethupathy (1868–1905), Raja of Ramnad

== Other uses ==
- Bhaskara Satellite series, satellites built by the Indian Space Research Organisation

== See also ==
- Bhaskar (disambiguation)
- Bhaskara's formula, another name (after Bhaskara II) for the quadratic formula
- Bhaskara's formula or Bhāskara I's sine approximation formula
