= Elathur railway station =

Railway station in Kerala, India

Elathur
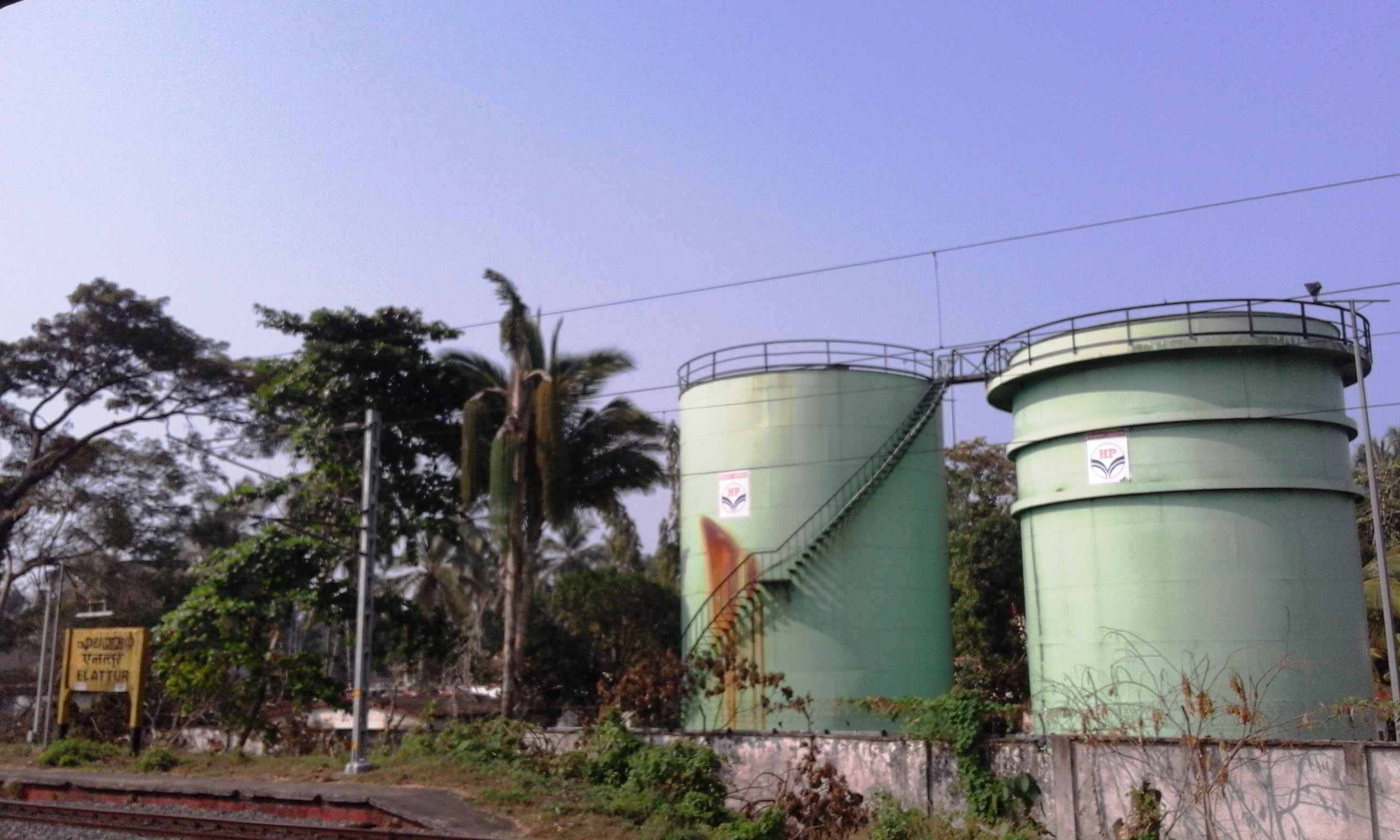
- Elathur railway station

General information
- Location: India
- Coordinates: 11.3464°N 75.7412°E
- System: Regional rail station
- Platforms: 3
- Tracks: 3

Other information
- Status: Functioning
- Station code
- Zone(s): Southern Railway zone
- Division(s): Palakkad
Route map
- Sources
Location
- Location within Kerala Location within India

Elathur Railway Station (station code: ETR) is an NSG–6 category Indian railway station in Palakkad railway division of Southern Railway zone. It is a railway station serving the city of Kozhikode in the Kozhikode District of Kerala. It lies in the Shoranur–Mangalore section of the Southern Railways. Trains halting at the station connect the town to prominent cities in India such as Kozhikode, Coimbatore and Kannur.
