= V. Bhaskar =

Indian economist

- Venkataraman Bhaskar
- Born: 18 March 1969 (age 57)
- Education: University of Oxford (PhD)
- Awards: National Science Foundation Grant
- Scientific career
- Fields: Industrial organization
- Workplaces: University of Texas at Austin, University College London (2005-2014)
- Thesis: Oligopoly and the macro-economy : A study of pricing, employment and investment. (1987)
- Doctoral advisors: John Muellbauer; David Soskice
- Doctoral students: Farshad Fatemi

Venkataraman Bhaskar (born 18 March 1969) is an Indian economist and Sue Killam Professor of Economics at the University of Texas at Austin.

== Career ==
Bhaskar received his BA from Madras University and his MA from Jawaharlal Nehru University and completed his doctoral studies at Oxford University.

He has previously taught at University College London (2005–2014), University of Essex (1998–2005), St. Andrews University (1995–1998) and the Delhi School of Economics (1989–1995). Bhaskar is known for his works on microeconomic theory and industrial organization.

== Books ==
- The North, the South and the Environment, edited with Andrew Glyn, Earthscan (London), February 1995
- Oxford Review of Economic Policy (Special Issue on India), edited with Bishnupriya Gupta, June 2007
