= Bhaskar–Jagannathan syndrome =

- Specialty: Genetic disorder

Bhaskar–Jagannathan syndrome is an extremely rare genetic disorder and there is a limited amount of information related to it. Similar or related medical conditions are arachnodactyly, aminoaciduria, congenital cataracts, cerebellar ataxia, and delayed developmental milestones.

== Signs and symptoms ==
Bhaskar–Jagannathan has symptoms such as long fingers, thin fingers, poor balance, incoordination, high levels of amino acids in urine, cataracts during infancy, and ataxia. Ataxia, which is a neurological sign and symptom made up of gross incoordination of muscle movements and is a specific clinical manifestation

== Diagnosis ==
There are three different ways to diagnose Bhaskar–Jagannathan. This disorder may be diagnosed by a urine test, a blood test, and an X-ray of the eyes or other body parts.

== Treatment ==
Treatment for this rare genetic disorder can be physical therapy, there have been antibiotics found to be effective, and surgery has been found to be another solution.
