= M. Bhaskaran =

Indian politician (died 2020)

M. Bhaskaran (died 21 October 2020) was an Indian politician, and member of the Communist Party of India (Marxist). He was the mayor of Kozhikode from 2005 to 2010 and a member of the Kozhikode District Committee of CPI(M). He was from a small village Karaparamba in Kozhikode.

Bhaskaran joined CPI(M) in 1964. Since 1974, he has been a full-time activist.
