= A. Sujanapal =

Indian politician

Member of the Kerala Legislative Assembly
- In office 2001–2006
- Preceded by: M. Dasan
- Succeeded by: A. Pradeep Kumar
- Constituency: Kozhikode North
- In office 1991–1996
- Preceded by: M. Dasan
- Succeeded by: M. Dasan
- Constituency: Kozhikode North

Minister of Forests and Environment, Government of Kerala
- In office 4 January 2006 – 12 May 2006
- Preceded by: K. P. Viswanathan
- Succeeded by: Benoy Viswam

Personal details
- Born: 1 February 1949 Kozhikode, Malabar district, India
- Died: 23 June 2011 (aged 62) Kozhikode, Kerala
- Party: Indian National Congress
- Spouse: Jayasree
- Children: 2

A. Sujanapal (February 1, 1949 - June 23, 2011) was an advocate, social worker and Indian National Congress politician from Kerala, India. He represented Kozhikode North Assembly constituency in 9th and 11th Kerala Legislative Assembly. He was the Minister of Forests and Environment in the Kerala Cabinet in first Oommen Chandy ministry. He wrote several books including travelogues.

== Biography ==
A. Sujanapal was born on February 1, 1949, at Kozhikode, the son of freedom fighter A. Balagopalan and social activist Anandalakshmi. He was graduated from Zamorin's Guruvayoorappan College, Kozhikode and obtained his law degree from the Government Law College, Kozhikode.

=== Personal life and death ===
Sujanapal and his wife Jayasree have two children. He died on June 23, 2011, due to complications of cancer, at a private hospital in Kozhikode.

== Political career ==
Sujanapal was active in politics from his school times. He entered politics through Kerala Students Union (KSU).

In addition to being the KPCC Treasurer and general secretary, Kozhikode District Congress Committee president and general secretary, president, of Kozhikode district Youth Congress Committee, he has also served as a syndicate member of University of Calicut and secretary of Friends of Soviet Union.

Sujanapal represented Kozhikode North Assembly constituency in 9th and 11th Kerala Legislative Assembly and was the Minister of Forests and Environment in the Kerala Cabinet in first Oommen Chandy ministry, from January 4, 2006. During the period 2001–2005, he also served as the chairman of Committee on Private Members' Bills and Resolutions. He also served as the chairman of Kerala Legislative Assembly Library Committee. He has also contested in the Lok Sabha elections twice.

Sujanapal was also active in the cultural sphere of Kozhikode and was also the chief organizer of many such associations.

== Books written ==
- Karayaruthu Sahva Karayaruthu (in Malayalam). Mathrubhumi books. 2008. ISBN 9788182646872.
- Maranam Kaathukidakkunna kandal kaadukal. Kozhikode: Haritham books. 2005.
- Karutha Britain. Kottayam: Sahithya Pravarthaka Co-operative Society. 2001.
- Gandhisam Erupathonnam noottandil. Kozhikode: Paiyon books. 2001.
- യുദ്ധസ്മരണകളിലൂടെ ഒരു യാത്ര Yuddhasmaranakaliloode oru yathra (in Malayalam) (3 ed.). Kozhikode: Haritham books. 2011.
- Poruthunna Palestine (in Malayalam). 1983.
- Michelangelo: athmeeyathayude varna vasantham (in Malayalam). Mathrubhumi books. 2007. ISBN 8182643759.
- സുജനപാലിന്റെ യാത്രകൾ (Sujanapalinte Yathrakal) [Sujanapal's travels] (in Malayalam) (3 ed.). Kozhikode: Haritham books. 2015. Travelogue.
- Moonnam Lokam

== Legacy ==
In memory of him, the A. Sujanapal Memorial Educational and Cultural Center is giving Sujanapal Award since 2021. First award was given to Ramesh Chennithala.
