= Government Engineering College, Kozhikode =

Public engineering institute in Kerala, India

- Other names: GECK, GECKKD
- Motto: विश्वास अभिमान को निर्धारित करता है (vishvaas abhimaan ko nirdhaarit karata hai)
- Motto in English: "Faith determines pride"
- Type: Public
- Established: 1999
- Accreditation: AICTE
- Affiliations: Universities (Since 1999): 1. APJ Abdul Kalam Technological University (Since 2015); 2. University of Calicut (1999-2015)
- Chairman: L.S. Ganesh, IIT Madras
- Principal: Sajith P.P.
- Dean: K.M. Kouzer (UG Dean); Binu T.V. (PG Dean)
- Faculty: 91
- Administrative staff: 141
- Undergraduates: 1900
- Postgraduates: 810
- Location: Kozhikode, Kerala, India; 11°17′8″N 75°46′12″E
- Campus: 10 acres (4.0 ha)
- Language: English, Malayalam
- Website: www.geckkd.ac.in
- Location within Kerala Location within India

Government Engineering College, Kozhikode (GECK), is a public engineering institute established by the Department of Technical Education under the Government of Kerala in India. It was one of the five public engineering institutes sanctioned in 1999 by the Government of Kerala. It is one of the 138 institutes affiliated to the APJ Abdul Kalam Technological University since 2015.

Admissions to various Undergraduate programmes are provided on the basis of the merit rank list prepared after the performance of candidates in the Kerala Engineering Architecture Medical (KEAM) entrance test conducted annually. The institute has five engineering departments: Civil engineering, Computer Science and Design, Mechanical engineering, Chemical engineering, Electronics and Communication engineering, and Applied Electronics and Instrumentation Engineering. The institute is well connected to the Kozhikode city by roads, the institute campus is about 5 km (3.1 mi) away from the Kozhikode Railway Station and 30 km (19 mi) from Calicut International Airport.

== History ==
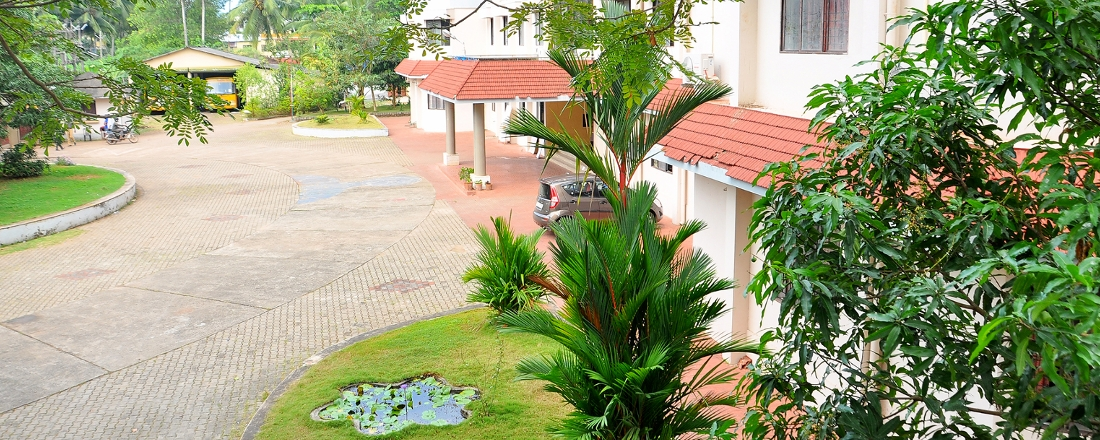
GECKKD main block

Government Engineering College Kozhikode (GECK) is one of nine Government Engineering Colleges in Kerala under the Directorate of Technical Education, Kerala. GECKKD was started in the year 1999 with B.Tech. programs in Applied Electronics and Instrumentation Engineering (AE &I), Chemical Engineering (Ch.E), and Mechanical Engineering (ME). Civil Engineering (CE) program was started in the year 2006 and Electronics and Communication Engineering (ECE) program was started in the year 2012. In addition to B.Tech. programs, the college conducts M.Tech. programmes in Signal Processing (AE &I), Energy Systems Analysis and Design (ME) and Computer-Aided Process Design (Ch. E).

The Government Engineering College Kozhikode is one of the five Government Engineering Colleges given sanction in the year 1999. On 24 July 2006, seven years after its founding, the college was shifted to Westhill Kozhikode to its original building. The then Kerala Chief Minister V.S. Achuthanandan inaugurated the new block of the college on 24 July 2006. Kozhikode MLA A.Pradeepkumar presided over the function. Minister for Education M.A.Baby inaugurated the thermal engineering laboratory on the occasion. The thermal engineering lab was constructed at the cost of Rs.68.27 lakhs. The four-storey main block of the engineering college consists of 14 classrooms, room for the principal, office room, conference hall, cooperative store, NCC room, Physical Education, Chemistry Physics Laboratories, drawing halls, mess halls, lifts and toilets. The total cost of the project was Rs. 394.34 lakhs. The construction activities of the main building began on November 17, 2003, and ended in 2006.

== Academics ==
The college offers six Bachelor of Technology (B.Tech.) and four Master of Engineering (M.Tech.) courses. It is affiliated with the University of Calicut and APJ Abdul Kalam Technological University, and is recognized by the All India Council of Technical Education (AICTE). 66 regular students and six lateral entry students are accepted and enrolled in a B.Tech. course every year, while the intake for the M.Tech. course is 18 students.

Undergraduate Programs:

- B.Tech. in Mechanical Engineering
- B.Tech. in Chemical Engineering
- B.Tech. in Civil Engineering
- B.Tech. in Electronics and Communication Engineering
- B.Tech. in Applied Electronics and Instrumentation
- B.Tech. in Computer Science and Design Engineering
- B.Tech. in Electrical and Computer Engineering

Postgraduate Programs:

- M.Tech. in Mechanical Engineering (Energy System Analysis and Design)
- M.Tech. in Electronics and Communication Engineering (Signal Processing)
- M.Tech. in Chemical Engineering (Computer-aided Process Design)
- M.Tech in Civil Engineering(Structural Engineering)

=== Ranking ===
Ranking of Gec Kozhikode by APJ KTU based on academic performance of students [Pass percentage of students]. 2020 - Rank of 39/144 institutions with pass percentage of 36.88% S8 pass percentage for the year 2019 = 75.55% 2018 Btech S2 supplementary exam college wise pass percentage - 71.53%

== Facilities ==
GECKKD's campus has several facilities.

=== Laboratory ===
The thermal engineering lab of the chemical engineering department has Atomic Absorption Spectrophotometer, Fourier Transform Infrared Spectroscopy, High-Pressure Liquid Chromatography, Gas Chromatography-Mass Spectroscopy the lab is equipped with these devices for the chemical engineering students.

=== Central computing facility ===
Apart from sufficient computing facilities in each department, the college has a central computing facility with PC workstations. The CCF is equipped with over 75 Client machines, Server Class Machines, High-Speed LAN, Cisco Router etc. A LAN (local area network) facility that runs on Linux servers forms the backbone of the centre. Students shall get ample opportunities to develop their knowledge in the field of information technology and skills in UNIX like environment and software development. A leased line connects the CCF to the internet. The centre offers free internet connectivity to the students and faculty members. The centre is equipped with computing environments including Unix, Sun Solaris and Linux along with software tools like Microsoft Visual Studio, C++, C, Fortran, Pascal, Java, MATLAB, AutoCAD, Kylix VHDL, Innoveda VHDL, Nisa and Qt Creator.

=== Library ===
GECK has a computerized library called the Technical Library and Documentation Centre. It subscribes to international and national technical journals and includes a digital, searchable information system. The audio-visual section maintains CD-ROMs on engineering subjects. Projects and seminar reports of students are archived in the library. Furthermore, the library holds books for general reading, and to prepare for competitive examinations like GATE, the GRE, and TOEFL.

=== Other facilities ===
GECKKD provides buses that transport students residing in the vicinity of Kozhikode to the college. It runs its own cafeteria. Facilities for basketball, volleyball and badminton are available. The college shares its college cricket and football space with the Government Polytechnic. The college has a direct uplink with GSAT-3, an Indian communications satellite. It has six information technology-enabled smart classrooms with LCD projectors and laptops.

== Student Chapters ==
=== Institute of Electrical and Electronics Engineers ===
GECK is associated with the Institute of Electrical and Electronics Engineers (IEEE). With IEEE society memberships, students can receive information about recent developments in their chosen fields of technology and contact other engineers. The GECK IEEE unit in Calicut Government Engineering College provides help to students in electronic engineering, and instrumentation and control engineering

=== Career Guidance and Placement Cell ===
The Career Guidance and Placement Cell (CGPC) conducts workshops and training programs for students. One of its programs involves giving help to GECK students off-campus from the students and faculty of other colleges.

=== Entrepreneurship and Innovative Engineering Cell ===
The Entrepreneurship and Innovative Engineering Cell (EIE Cell), is the joint association of Innovation and Entrepreneurship Development Cell (IEDC) and Technology Business Incubator (TBI), of Government Engineering College Kozhikode. The cell has been actively conducting various events aimed at promoting Innovation, Technology and Business among the student community which includes:

- Information and resourceful technical sessions.
- Business talks
- Exciting technical competitions.
- Workshops on emerging technologies.
- Entrepreneurial tips.
- Engaging tech articles on the newest innovations.

=== ISTE GECK ===
ISTE GECK Student Chapter has been very actively conducting various events aiming at the academic excellence and personality development of students. Which includes

• Enhancing student exposure on the latest technological advancements

• Conducting talks/seminars/ workshops/ conferences on topics of relevance to technical education

• Conducting debates/puzzles/quiz/ etc.

• Conducting Alumni talks

• Conducting literary activities

• Weekly GATE/CAT mock test.

• Mock tests to prepare highly competitive exams like UPSC, PSC, and Bank tests.

The ISTE GECK Students' Chapter was honoured to host the 19th Annual ISTE State Student Convention, which was a three-day convention conducted in the last week of January 2021. The theme of the convention was "Navigating the new normal through advancements in science and technology". As part of 19th Annual ISTE State Student Convention, ISTE GECK Students' Chapter has organized many online events during the convention and made sure that all the event had maximum participation. The details of the events conducted are given in YepDesk profile of the ISTE GECK student chapter.

The ISTE organization of the college has been performing well and has won three state-level awards for the year 2019-20 for the conduction of maximum number of activities, Best staff advisor award with special appreciation for Dr.Ahammed Muneer KV, and best student award for Indusha Dharman of Applied Electronics

=== National Service Scheme ===
The Technical Cell of the National Service Scheme (NSS) encourages students and staff to participate in social work. Volunteers organize programs such as seminars and orientation programs inside and outside the campus. The motto of the organization is "Personality development through social service."

The NSS's GECK unit has been given awards for its performance. These include:

- Indhira Gandhi National award for Best NSS unit
- Best NSS programme officer award (Abid Tharavattath)
- State award for best NSS unit

=== Arts Club ===
The Arts Club, whose full name is the Malar Vadi Arts Club, organizes workshops and training programs along with cultural events in the college in association with College Union Inauguration and Annual Arts Day.

=== Energy and Environment Conservation Club ===
The Energy and Environment Conservation Club (EEEC), functioning under the Energy Conservation Society of Kerala, conducts programs to educate students about energy- and environment-related problems. The objective of EECC is to foster conservation of energy and protection of the environment to promote the sustainable development of mankind. The society's topics are energy auditing, reuse and recycling technology, wastewater utilization, pollution control, environmental protection measures, and promoting awareness among the public.

=== Centre for Continuing Education ===
The Centre for Continuing Education (CCE) focuses on training youth for employment. It conducts vocational training, trains unemployed youth in full-time and informal programs, develops management skills, performs in-service training to the already employed and publishes materials for training programs. The CCE was originally a sub-center of a similar program in Thiruvananthapuram, the capital of Kerala.

=== Industry Institute Interaction Cell ===
The Industry Institute Interaction Cell (IIIC) is a forum of interaction between industries and institutes through product testing, consulting, and research and development. The cell is associated with the District Industries Centre. Indian industries sponsor research and development activities, help develop the IIIC's curriculum and select qualified candidates. The testing and laboratory facilities in the college are used by companies for their needs. Students' ideas are shared with companies for commercial applications.

== Student life ==
=== Lakshya ===
Lakshya is a national technical festival in which students of GECK participate. It is a platform for engineering students to showcase their skills and knowledge. So far, it has been held six times: in 2011, 2013, 2016, 2018,2019 and 2023.

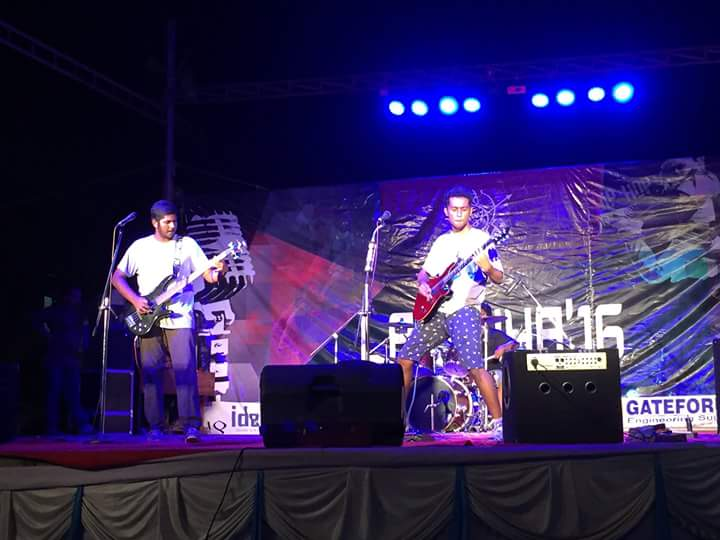
Lakshya 16

=== Alumni Association ===
The Kozhikode Engineering College Alumni Association was launched in 2003. The completion of any degree at GECK allows a person to become a member of the association. On 16 August 2014, the Alumni Association held a reunion of the first two classes of graduates from GECKKD.

=== Media Club ===
A community formed by students which were officially launched and started working in 2018 onwards. started as a media committee of Lakshya’18 (Student Coordinator: Mohammed, Ashish Anandhagosh, Rohit Vinay ). The Media Club is a Community of Students united by a common interest.

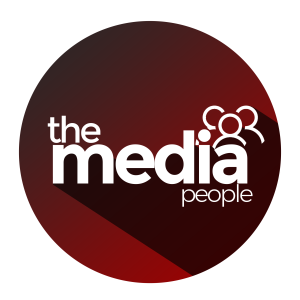
The media people logo

== See also ==
- Education in India
- Education in Kerala
- List of institutions of higher education in Kerala
- List of colleges affiliated to the University of Calicut
