= Pavangad, Kozhikode =

Pavangad
- Suburb
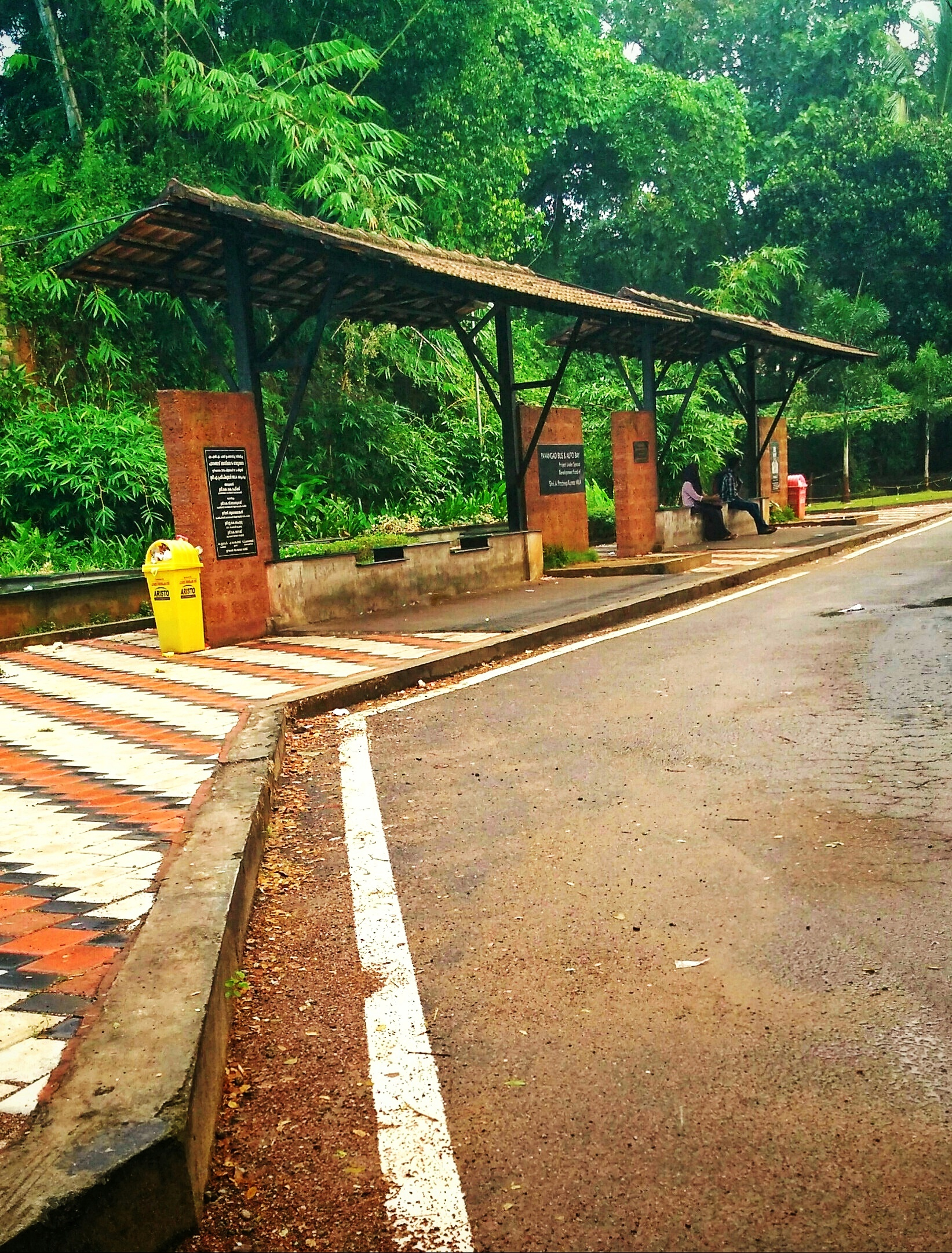
- Interactive map of Pavangad
- Coordinates: 11°18′52.82″N 75°45′15.63″E
- Country: India
- State: Kerala
- District: Kozhikode

Languages
  - Official: Malayalam, English
- Time zone: UTC+5:30 (IST)
- PIN: 673021
- Telephone code: 0495 239

Pavangad is a suburb included in Kozhikode corporation in the Kozhikode district of Kerala, India. It is located about 6.5 km north of Calicut on the Calicut-Kannur National Highway 66 (India) and is bounded by the Arabian Sea at the west, Canoli Canal at east and Korapuzha River at the north. State Highway 54 (Kerala) starts from Pavangad and ends in Kalpetta. Late Mr. K. T. Muhammed was a resident in Pavangad, popularly known as KT, was a Malayalam playwright and screenwriter. He died on 25 March 2008 at his residence. Pavangad is a fast-growing residential area towards the northern city limits of Kozhikode. Sneha Residence association is one of the major residential associations in this locality which consists of around 237 houses.

== Puthiyappa ==
Puthiyappa is an important fishing harbour of Kozhikode district within the city limits. Pavangad is 500m away from the harbour site. There is a natural bay at Puthiyappa formed due to the protrusion of land into the sea.

== Transportation ==
Pavangad is well connected with both road and rail networks. There are public and private transports that run in these roads. NH 66(Old NH 17) and SH 54 are the important roads passing through pavangad. National Highway 66 connects Kozhikode to Mumbai via Mangalore, Udupi and Goa to the north and Kochi and Kanyakumari near Thiruvananthapuram to the south along the west coast of India. This highway connects the city with the other important towns like Uppala, Kasaragod, Kanhangad, Kannur, Thalassery, Mahe, Vadakara, Koyilandy, Vengalam, Ramanattukara, Kottakkal, Kuttippuram, Ponnani, (Guruvayoor) Chavakkad, Kodungallur, North Paravur, Edapally and proceed to Kanyakumari.SH 54 is connecting city and Kalpetta. The highway is 99.0 kilometres (61.5 mi) long. The highway passes through Pavangad, Kozhikode, Ulliyeri, Perambra, Poozhithodu, Peruvannamuzhi and Padinjarethara.

== Automobile showrooms ==
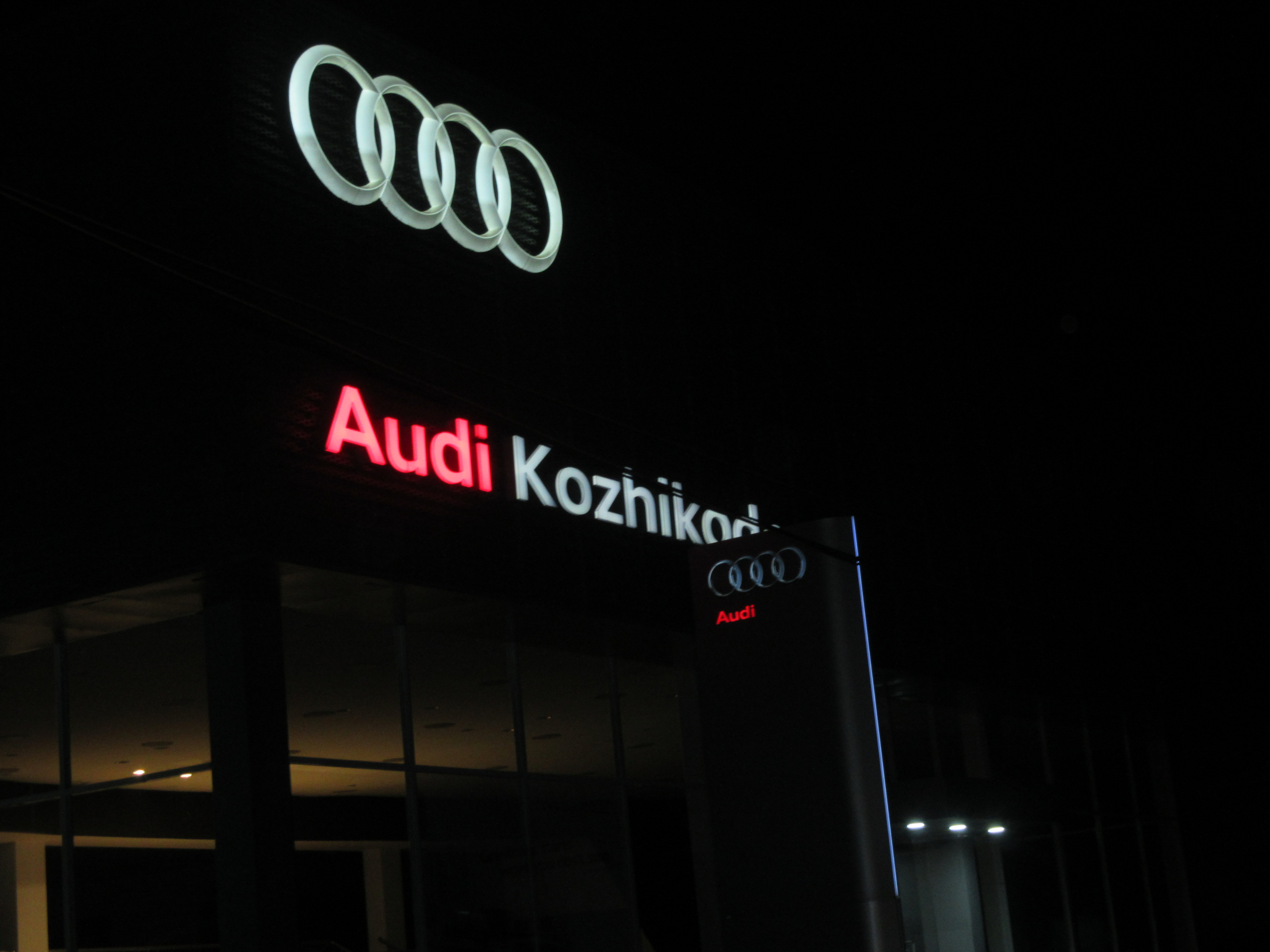
Audi Kozhikode

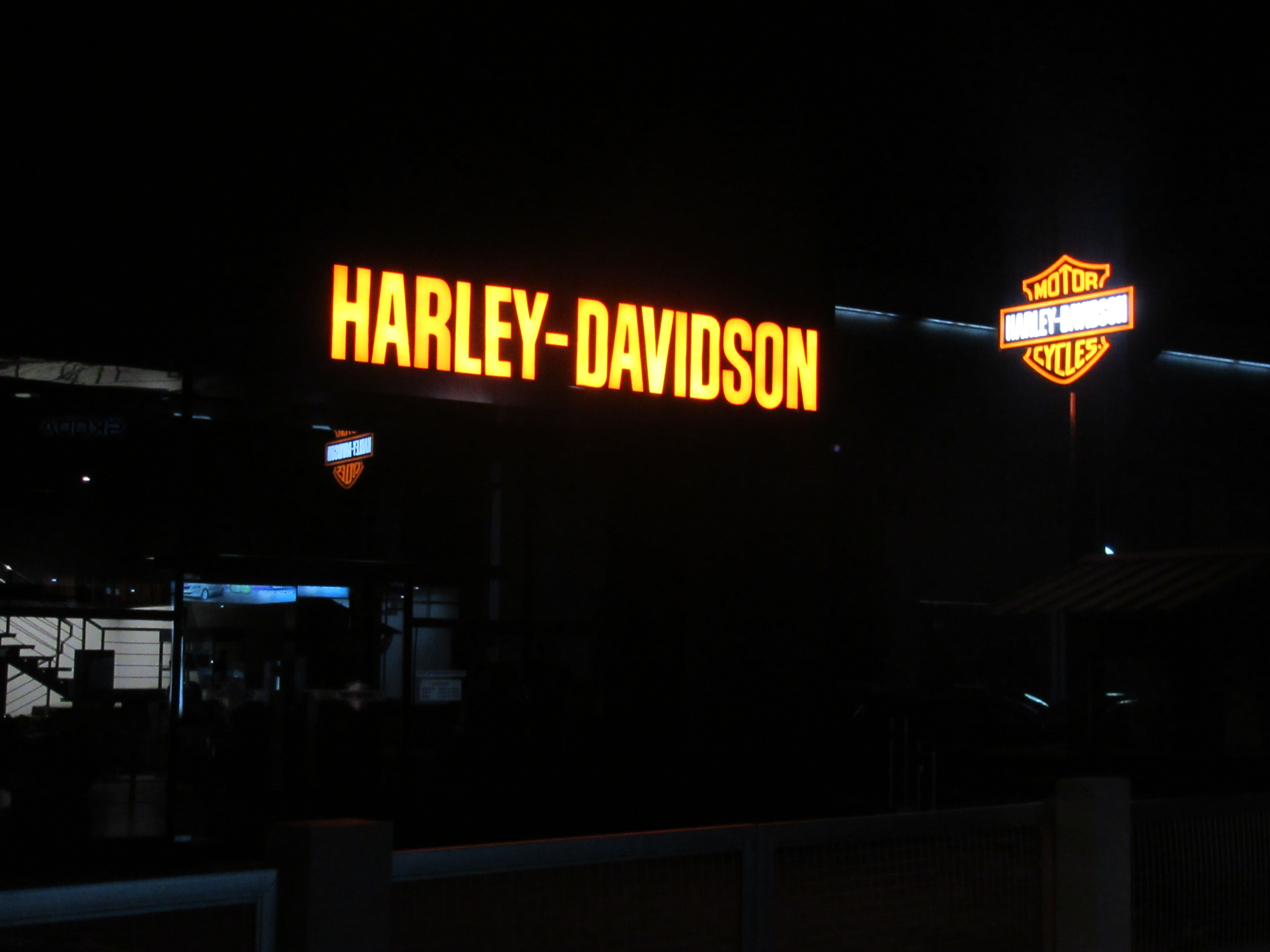
Harley Davidson Kozhikode

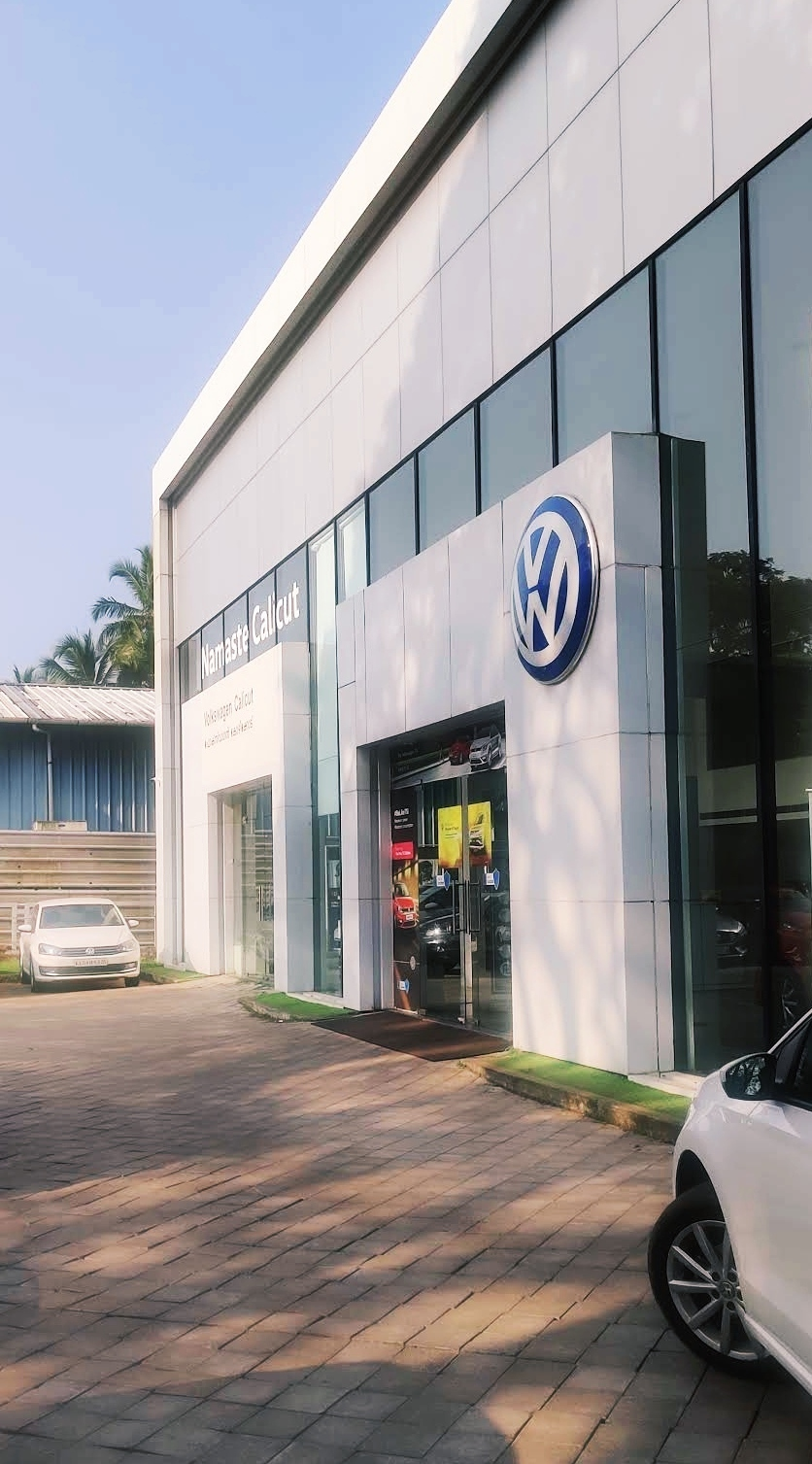
Volkswagen Kozhikkode

- Audi
- Volkswagen
- Harley Davidson
- Jawa Motorcycles
- Triumph
- Hyundai
- Nissan
- Eicher
- Royal Enfield
- skoda
- Nexa
- Maruti Suzuki ARENA

== Important landmarks ==
- Puthiyappa Harbour
- KSEB Sub station
- Darussalam Masjidh
- M.E.S. Indian school
- Malabar College
- Victoria College
- Puthur Durga Devi Temple
- Puthur UP School
- State Bank of India
- Movanari Temple
- Kozhikode KSRTC Depot
- Puthiyappa Temple
- Radio Mango (First Private Radio Station in Kerala)
