= Bhaskar Nagar =

- village
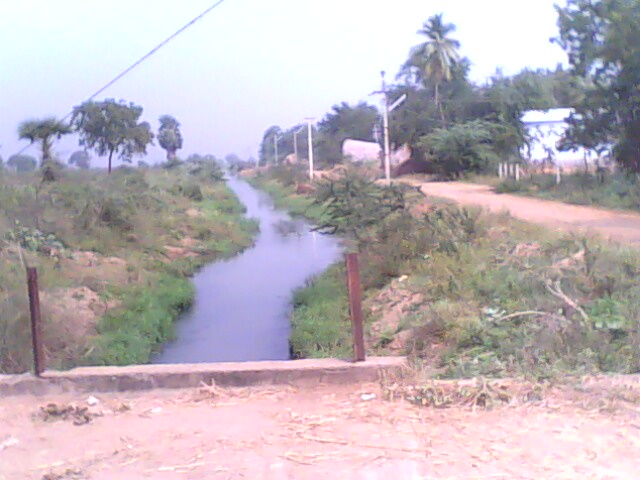
- Bhaskar Nagar Canal
- Interactive map of Bhaskar Nagar
- Location in Andhra Pradesh, India Bhaskar Nagar (India)
- Coordinates: 16.0568°N 79.8522°E
- Country: India
- State: Andhra Pradesh
- District: Palnadu

Population (2008)
  - Total: 500

Languages
  - Official: Telugu
- Time zone: UTC+5:30 (IST)
- PIN: 522646
- Telephone code: 08646
- Nearest city: Palnadu district
- Literacy: 65%
- Lok Sabha constituency: Narasaraopeta
- Vidhan Sabha constituency: Vinukonda

Bhaskar Nagar is a village in Savalyapuram, mandal in Palnadu district, part of Andhra Pradesh, India.

== History ==
Bhaskar Nagar is a small village comprising nearly 100 houses. It has been founded by Bhaskar Rao, hence the name Bhaskar Nagar. Most of the inhabitants have come from villages near vinukonda in guntur. This village is part of Guntur District.

== Festivals ==
- Sri rama navami
- Vinayaka chaturthi
- Vijaya dashami
- Makar Sankranti
