= K.Jayanth =

Indian politician

K. Jayanth is an Indian politician. He is a member of the Kerala Legislative Assembly. He represents Kozhikode North assembly constituency in 16th Kerala State Legislative Assembly. He belongs to Indian National Congress
