= Kozhikode Municipal Corporation =

Local civic body in Kozhikode, Kerala, India

Kozhikode Municipal Corporation കോഴിക്കോട് മുനിസിപ്പൽ കോർപ്പറേഷൻ

Type
- Type: Municipal Corporation of Kozhikode
- Term limits: 5 years

History
- Founded: 1962

Leadership
- Mayor: O. Sadashivan (CPI(M)) (CPI(M))
- Deputy Mayor: S. Jayasree (CPI(M)
- Corporation Secretary: Binu K.U
- Police Commissioner: T. Narayanan IPS
- Municipal Corporation Secretary: Mrunmai Joshi

Structure
- Seats: 76
- Political groups: Government (35) LDF (35): CPI(M) (33); CPI (1); NCP(SP) (1); Official Opposition (28); UDF (28): INC (14); IUML (12); IND (2); Other Opposition (13): BJP (13)
- Committees: 8: Development standing committee; Education & Sports standing committee; Finance standing committee; Health standing committee; Public works standing committee; Tax appeal standing committee; Town planning standing committee; Welfare standing committee
- Length of term: 5 years

Elections
- Voting system: First-past-the-post
- Last election: 11 December 2025
- Next election: December 2030

Meeting place
- Corporation Office, Kozhikode

Website
- kozhikodecorporation.lsgkerala.gov.in

Kozhikode Corporation is the municipal corporation that administers the city of Kozhikode, Kerala. Established in 1962, it is in the Kozhikode parliamentary constituency. The first mayor was H. Manjunatha Rao. Its four assembly constituencies are Kozhikode North (State Assembly constituency), Kozhikode South (State Assembly constituency), Beypore (State Assembly constituency) and Elathur (State Assembly constituency). The Corporation is headed by a mayor and council, and manages 118.58 km^{2} of the city of Kozhikode, with a population of about 609,224 within that area. Kozhikode Municipal Corporation has been formed with functions to improve the infrastructure of city.

== History ==
The ancient port of Tyndis which was located on the northern side of Muziris, as mentioned in the Periplus of the Erythraean Sea, was somewhere around Kozhikode. Its exact location is a matter of dispute. The suggested locations are Ponnani, Tanur, Beypore-Chaliyam-Kadalundi-Vallikkunnu, and Koyilandy. Tyndis was a major center of trade, next only to Muziris, between the Cheras and the Roman Empire.

In the 14th century, Kozhikode conquered larger parts of central Kerala after the seize of Tirunavaya region from Valluvanad, which were under the control of the king of Perumbadappu Swaroopam (Cochin). The ruler of Perumpadappu was forced to shift his capital (c. CE 1405) further south from Kodungallur to Kochi. In the 15th century, the status of Cochin was reduced to a vassal state of Kozhikode, thus leading to the emergence of Kozhikode as the most powerful kingdom on the medieval Malabar Coast.

Kozhikode was the largest city in the Indian state of Kerala under the rule of Zamorin of Calicut, an independent kingdom based at Kozhikode. It remained so until 18th century CE. Under British Raj, it acted as the headquarters of Malabar District, one of the two districts in the western coast of erstwhile Madras Presidency. The port at Kozhikode held the superior economic and political position in medieval Kerala coast, while Kannur, Kollam, and Kochi, were commercially important secondary ports, where the traders from various parts of the world would gather. The Portuguese arrived at Kappad Kozhikode in 1498 during the Age of Discovery, thus opening a direct sea route from Europe to South Asia. The port at Kozhikode was the gateway to South Indian coast for the Arabs, the Portuguese, the Dutch, and finally the British. The Kunjali Marakkars, who were the naval chief of the Zamorin of Kozhikode, are credited with organizing the first naval defense of the Indian coast. During the British rule, Malabar's chief importance lay in producing pepper. Kozhikode municipality was formed on 1 November 1866 according to the Madras Act 10 of 1865 (Amendment of the Improvements in Towns act 1850) of the British Indian Empire, making it the first modern municipality in the state. It was upgraded into a Municipal Corporation in 1962, making it the second-oldest Municipal Corporation in the state.

Wards of Kozhikode Municipal Corporation

== Revenue sources ==
The following are the Income sources for the Corporation from the Central and State Government.

=== Revenue from taxes ===
Following is the Tax related revenue for the corporation.

- Property tax.
- Profession tax.
- Entertainment tax.
- Grants from Central and State Government like Goods and Services Tax.
- Advertisement tax.

=== Revenue from non-tax sources ===
Following is the Non Tax related revenue for the corporation.

- Water usage charges.
- Fees from Documentation services.
- Rent received from municipal property.
- Funds from municipal bonds.

== Divisions ==
Kozhikode Municipal Corporation is divided into 76 wards for ease of administration from which a member is elected from each for a duration of five years.

Kozhikode Corporation Wards (2025-)
Ward No	Ward Name
1	Elathur
2	Chettikulam
3	Eranhikkal
4	Puthur
5	Mokavur
6	Kundooparamb
7	Karuvissery
8	Malapparamb
9	Thadambattu Thazham
10	Vengeri
11	Poolakkadavu
12	Paroppadi
13	Civil Station
14	Chevarambalam
15	Vellimadukunnu
16	Moozhikkal
17	Chelavoor
18	Mayanad
19	Medical College South
20	Medical College
21	Chevayur
22	Kovoor
23	Nellikkode
24	Kudilthodu
25	Kottooli
26	Parayancheri
27	Puthiyara
28	Kuthiravattam
29	Pottammal
30	Kommeri
31	Kuttiyil Thazham
32	Methottu Thazham
33	Pokkunnu
34	Kinassery
35	Mankavu
36	Aychavattam
37	Kallai
38	Panniyankara
39	Meenchantha
40	Thiruvannur
41	Areekkad North
42	Areekkad
43	Nallalam
44	Kolathara
45	Kundayithode
46	Cheruvannur East
47	Cheruvannur West
48	Beypur Port
49	Beypur
50	Maradu
51	Naduvattam
52	Nadivattam East
53	Arakkinar
54	Mathottam
55	Payyanakkal
56	Nadinagar
57	Chakkumkadavu
58	Mukhadar
59	Kuttichira
60	Chalappuram
61	Palayam
62	Mavoor Road
63	Moonnalingal
64	Thiruthiyad
65	Eranhippalam
66	Nadakkavu
67	Vellayil
68	Thoppayil
69	Chakkarothukulam
70	Karapparamb
71	East Hill
72	Athanikkal
73	West Hill
74	Edakkad
75	Puthiyangadi
76	Puthiyappa

== Current members ==
The 76 wards of the Kozhikode Municipal Corporation and their councillors for the 2025–2030 term are listed below in serial order.

Mayor: O. Sadasivan (CPIM)
Deputy Mayor: S. Jayasree (CPIM)
Ward Details		Councillor	Party	Alliance	Remarks
No.	Name	Councillor	Party	Alliance	Remarks
1	Elathur	Latha Kalangoli	Indian National Congress	UDF	
2	Chettikulam	E. Sunil Kumar	Communist Party of India (Marxist)	LDF	
3	Eranhikkal	V. P. Manoj	Communist Party of India (Marxist)	LDF	
4	Puthur	Aamira Siraj	Communist Party of India (Marxist)	LDF	
5	Mokavur	S. M. Thushara	Nationalist Congress Party (Sharadchandra Pawar)	LDF	
6	Kundooparamb	Shimjith T. S.	Communist Party of India (Marxist)	LDF	
7	Karuvissery	M. M. Latha	Communist Party of India (Marxist)	LDF	
8	Malapparamb	K. C. Shobhita	Indian National Congress	UDF	
9	Thadambattu Thazham	O. Sadashivan	Communist Party of India (Marxist)	LDF	Mayor
10	Vengeri	Rajini U.	Communist Party of India (Marxist)	LDF	
11	Poolakkadavu	Bijulal P.	Communist Party of India (Marxist)	LDF	
12	Paroppadi	Harish Pottangdi	Bharatiya Janata Party	NDA	
13	Civil Station	Vineetha Sajeev	Bharatiya Janata Party	NDA	
14	Chevarambalam	Saritha Parayeri	Bharatiya Janata Party	NDA	
15	Vellimadukunnu	Swapna Manoj	Indian National Congress	UDF	
16	Moozhikkal	Saajita Ghafoor	Indian Union Muslim League	UDF	
17	Chelavoor	P. Ushadevi	Communist Party of India (Marxist)	LDF	
18	Mayanad	Siddique M.	Indian Union Muslim League	UDF	
19	Medical College South	Kavitha C.	Communist Party of India (Marxist)	LDF	
20	Medical College	Sheethu Shivesh	Communist Party of India (Marxist)	LDF	
21	Chevayur	Vishwanathan P.	Indian National Congress	UDF	
22	Kovoor	Jigi Ramesan	Communist Party of India (Marxist)	LDF	
23	Nellikkode	P. K. Jijeesh	Communist Party of India (Marxist)	LDF	
24	Kudilthodu	N. Sanoop	Communist Party of India (Marxist)	LDF	
25	Kottooli	Dr.S. Jayashree	Communist Party of India (Marxist)	LDF	Deputy mayor
26	Parayancheri	Prabhita Rajeev	Communist Party of India (Marxist)	LDF	
27	Puthiyara	Bindu Udayakumar	Bharatiya Janata Party	NDA	
28	Kuthiravattam	Indira Krishnan	Bharatiya Janata Party	NDA	
29	Pottammal	T. Raneesh	Bharatiya Janata Party	NDA	
30	Kommeri	Kavita Arun	Independent	UDF	
31	Kuttiyil Thazham	Sujatha K.	Communist Party of India (Marxist)	LDF	
32	Methottu Thazham	M. P. Vineetha	Communist Party of India (Marxist)	LDF	
33	Pokkunnu	N. M. Shimna	Communist Party of India (Marxist)	LDF	
34	Kinassery	Zakir K.	Indian Union Muslim League	UDF	
35	Mankavu	Manakkal Shashi	Indian National Congress	UDF	
36	Aychavattam	Shafarina Abid	Indian National Congress	UDF	
37	Kallai	Kalakkandi Baiju	Indian National Congress	UDF	
38	Panniyankara	Nambidi Narayanan	Bharatiya Janata Party	NDA	
39	Meenchantha	S. K. Abubakar	Indian National Congress	UDF	
40	Thiruvannur	Ayishabi P.	Indian Union Muslim League	UDF	
41	Areekkad North	Jahish M.	Indian National Congress	UDF	
42	Areekkad	S. V. Syed Muhammad Shameel	Independent	UDF	
43	Nallalam	V. P. Ibrahim	Indian Union Muslim League	UDF	
44	Kolathara	Adam Malik	Communist Party of India (Marxist)	LDF	
45	Kundayithode	M. P. Muneer	Indian Union Muslim League	UDF	
46	Cheruvannur East	C. Sandesh	Communist Party of India (Marxist)	LDF	
47	Cheruvannur West	Shaharban M. P.	Communist Party of India (Marxist)	LDF	
48	Beypur Port	K. Rajeev	Communist Party of India (Marxist)	LDF	
49	Beypur	Shinu Pinnanath	Bharatiya Janata Party	NDA	
50	Maradu	Nimmi Prashanth	Communist Party of India (Marxist)	LDF	
51	Naduvattam	Kollarath Sureshan	Communist Party of India (Marxist)	LDF	
52	Nadivattam East	Thasleena K. P.	Communist Party of India (Marxist)	LDF	
53	Arakkinar	Beeran Koya P. P.	Communist Party of India (Marxist)	LDF	
54	Mathottam	Anitha Kumari E.	Communist Party of India (Marxist)	LDF	
55	Payyanakkal	Sayibunnisa M. P.	Indian Union Muslim League	UDF	
56	Nadinagar	Fasna Shamsudeen	Indian Union Muslim League	UDF	
57	Chakkumkadavu	Smitha Shalji	Indian National Congress	UDF	
58	Mukhadar	T. P. M. Jishan	Indian Union Muslim League	UDF	
59	Kuttichira	Adv.Fatima Tahilia	Indian Union Muslim League	UDF	
60	Chalappuram	Anilkumar K. P.	Bharatiya Janata Party	NDA	
61	Palayam	Adv.Sarah Jaffer	Communist Party of India (Marxist)	LDF	
62	Mavoor Road	Sreeja C. Nair	Bharatiya Janata Party	NDA	
63	Moonnalingal	Saffari V.	Indian Union Muslim League	UDF	
64	Thiruthiyad	Jisha Shabarish	Bharatiya Janata Party	NDA	
65	Eranhippalam	C. P. Saleem	Indian National Congress	UDF	
66	Nadakkavu	Agnivesh S. Cheroth	Indian National Congress	UDF	
67	Vellayil	Soufiya	Indian Union Muslim League	UDF	
68	Thoppayil	Laila Baiju	Communist Party of India (Marxist)	LDF	
69	Chakkarothukulam	N. Sivaprasad	Bharatiya Janata Party	NDA	
70	Karapparamb	Navya Haridas	Bharatiya Janata Party	NDA	
71	East Hill	Sreeja Suresh	Indian National Congress	UDF	
72	Athanikkal	Aashika Teacher	Communist Party of India	LDF	
73	West Hill	K. Saritha	Indian National Congress	UDF	
74	Edakkad	Shaini	Communist Party of India (Marxist)	LDF	
75	Puthiyangadi	P. Prasina	Communist Party of India (Marxist)	LDF	
76	Puthiyappa	Nishita Shiva	Communist Party of India (Marxist)	LDF	

== Corporation Election ==
=== Corporation Election 2025 ===
S.No.	Party name	Party symbol	Number of Corporators	Change	Map
1.	LDF		35	▼14	
2.	UDF		28	▲14	
3.	BJP		13	▲6	
4.	IND		0	▼5	
Total			76 (Note: Number of wards increased to 76 after delimitation.)		

=== Corporation Election 2020 ===
S.No.	Party name	Party symbol	Number of Corporators	Change
1.	LDF		49	▼1
2.	UDF		14	▼4
3.	BJP		07	Steady
4.	IND		05	▲5
Total			75	

=== Corporation Election 2015 ===
S.No.	Party name	Party symbol	Number of Corporators	Change
1.	LDF		50	Steady
2.	UDF		18	Steady
3.	BJP		7	Steady
4.	IND		0	Steady
Total			75	
