= Karaparamba =

- City
- Location in Kerala, India Karaparamba (India)
- Coordinates: 11°17′0″N 75°46′30″E
- Country: India
- State: Kerala
- District: Kozhikode

Government
  - Body: Kozhikode Corporation

Languages
  - Official: Malayalam, English
- Time zone: UTC+5:30 (IST)
- Lok Sabha constituency: Kozhikode
- Civic agency: Kozhikode Corporation

Karaparamba is a suburb included in Kozhikode Corporation in the Kozhikode district of Kerala, India. The first Graduate Homoeopathic medical college in Asia is situated here. The postal code for Karaparamba is 673010. Conolly Canal, part of the west coast canal network of Kerala flows through Karaparamba.

== Localities ==
The localities of Karaparamba include Karuvissery, Thadambattu Thazam, Vengeri, Krishnan Nair road and Challikara.

== Transportation ==
Karaparamba is situated five kilometers away from the city of Kozhikode. Kozhikode Mini Bypass road (SH 54), Kozhikode - Balussery road are the major road links to Karaparamba. The other important roads in and around Karaparamba are Pupils road connecting Westhill, PM Kutty (East Nadakave - Easthill) road connecting Nadakave, Florican road connecting Malaparmba, Krishnan Nair road connecting Kakodi, Ramanunni road, Janatha road, Nellikavu road, Chakittada, and OP Raman road.

== Civic administration ==
Karaparamba is a part of Kozhikode Corporation. As per the recent local Corporation election held in 2015 the following persons represent Karaparamba to Kozhikode corporation.

- Ward no: 7 - Karuvissery - Latha MM (LDF).
- Ward no: 9 - Thadambattu Thazam - Nikhil (LDF).
- Ward no: 10 - Vengeri - Rajani U (LDF).
- Ward no: 69 - Karaparamba - Navya Haridas (BJP).

== Educational institutions ==
Educational Institutions in and around karaparamba include:

- Govt Higher Secondary school Karaparamba
- Government Homoeopathic Medical College Kozhikode
- Easthill Govt. Higher Secondary school
- Kendriya Vidyalaya no: 1 in Easthill.
- Govt. Lower Primary School.
- Govt. Physical Education college in Easthill.

== Religious Places in Karaparamba ==
- Kuttiyatu Kavu Paradevada Temple.
- Nellikavu Bhagavati Temple.
- Kalluvettu Kuzhikkal Bhagavati Temple.
- Karaparamba Mosque.
- Karaparamba Juma Masjid.
- Fathima Matha Church.
- Udhaya Kurumba Bhagawathi Temple.
- Mundakkat Bhagawathi Temple.
- Thiruthiyil Sree Krishan Temple Vengeri.
- Vengeri Sree Subramaniya Temple.
