= Peringolam =

- Village
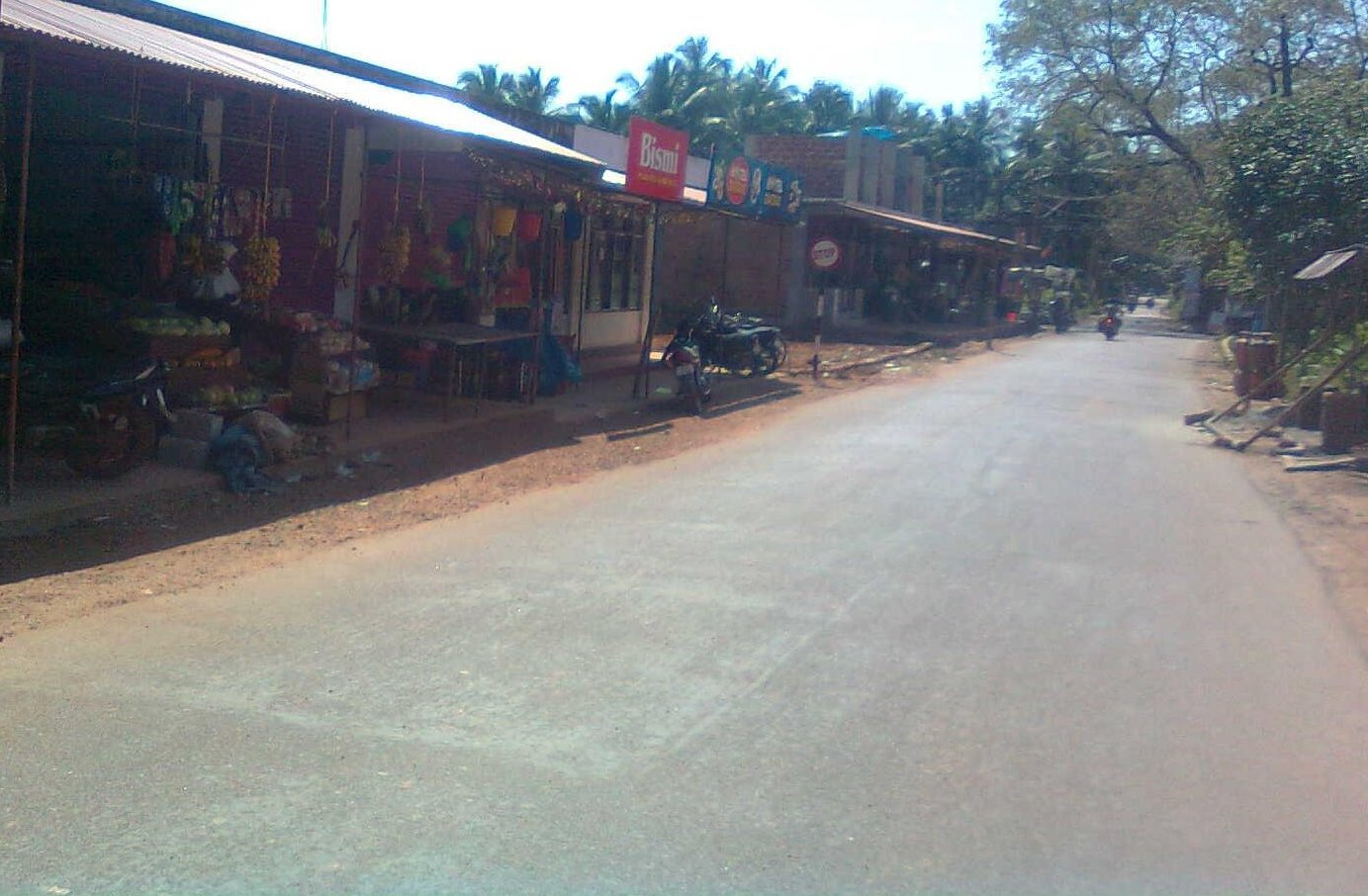
- Peringolam Town

- Location in Kerala, India Peringolam (India)
- Coordinates: 11°17′23″N 75°52′48″E
- Country: India
- State: Kerala
- District: Kozhikode

Languages
  - Official: Malayalam, English
- Time zone: UTC+5:30 (IST)
- Postal code: 673571
- Telephone code: 0495
- Vehicle registration: KL 11
- Nearest city: Kozhikode
- Lok Sabha constituency: Kozhikode
- Sub District: Kozhikode
- Grama Panchayath: Peruvayal
- Website: peringolamtown.blogspot.com

Peringolam is a village situated in the west of Peruvayal panchayath in Kozhikode district, Kerala. It is located two kilometers away from NH 766. This village is surrounded by Kunnamangalam, Kuttikkatoor, Kurikkathoor and Kottamparamb. Peringolam is famous as a location for several important institutions including milma regional headquarter.

== Etymology ==
The word Peringolam derived from two Malayalam words "Peru" means largest and "Kulam" means pond. It denotes an earstwhile presence of a large pond in this village. It is known as 'Parol' in local usage.

== Governing body ==
Peringolam is a part of Peruvayal Gramapanchayath. It includes two wards, i.e. ward 1 and ward 2. The present Member of Ward 2, RV Jafar, is the president of Peruvayal Gramapanchayath.

== Educational institutions ==
- Government Higher Secondary School Peringolam
- Centre for Water Resources Development and Management - CWRDM
- Kerala School of Mathematics
- Indian Institute of Management Kozhikode (IIMK)
- Anganwadi, Santhichira
- Al-Birr Pre-primary School

== Industries ==
- Milma [MRCMPU Ltd]
- Mercy Foods

== Places of worship ==
- Juma' Masjid
- Sree Durga Bagavathi Kshethram
- Srambya Masjid

== Cultural centres ==
- Njanapradhayini Library & Reading Room
- 'Iqra' Library

== Cultural groups ==
- Marhama Edu-support Programme

It is an educational service programme run by the Students Islamic Organisation of India (SIO) Peringolam Unit. Marhama helps students with the distribution of study materials and scholarships.

- Santhi Residents Association
- Pain & Paliative Care
- Lahari Virudha Samithi

It is a common platform of all local political and social groups of Peringolam against narcotic materials. It conducted a Human chain programme on 2 October 2014 at Peringolam.

- Action Committee against alleged Pollution by Milma
