= Institute of Palliative Medicine (Kozhikode) =

Indian research centre

The Institute of Palliative Medicine is an education, training and research centre for palliative care located in Kozhikode, India. The institute trains health care professionals in palliative care and related medical disciplines. Through its connection with Calicut Medical College and other clinics in the state of Kerala, the institute supports between 4,500 and 5,000 patients per week. This institute is an organ of Pain and Palliative Care Society, Medical College, Calicut, which was founded in 1993.

== History ==
The institute began as an outpatient unit at Government Medical College, Calicut in 1993. In 1999, the Pain and Palliative Care Society established the 'Neighbourhood Network in Palliative Care', aimed at increasing community participation in palliative care. In 2003, the Institute was shifted to a separate building for training, research and patient care. In 2008, this institute was recognized as a WHO collaborating centre in community participation in palliative care.

== Recognition ==
In 1996 the World Health Organization conferred on this society, the title 'Demonstration Project' and it became their model to the developing world. WHO has since accredited the institute as a World Health Organization Collaborating Center (WHOCC).

== Honours ==
Pain and Palliative Care Society, Kozhikode, has been chosen for a 'Person of the Year 2007' award by Indiavision, a Kerala-based Malayalam television channel. The honour is usually awarded to an outstanding individual. However this year the jury, headed by the distinguished writer M. T. Vasudevan Nair, was unanimous in selecting Pain and Palliative Care Society (PPCS). This award was received by Dr Suresh Kumar, Mr. P. K. Ashok Kumar and Dr. M. R. Rajagopal, co-founders of PPCS along with Mr. T. Balan Nair, the present secretary of PPCS at a function in Thiruvananthapuram.
