= Sree Kattayattu Bhagavathi Kshethram =

Hindu Temple in Peruvayal in Kerala

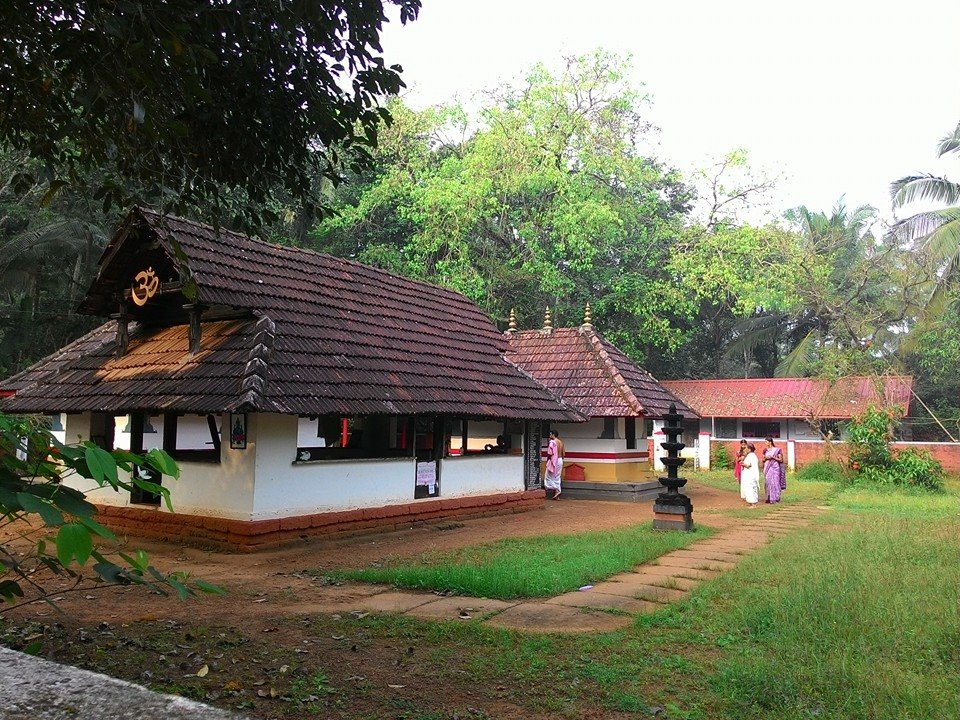

Kattayattu Devi Kshethram is a Devi temple situated in Peruvayal, a village near Kozhikkode, India.

== Main deity ==
The deity worshipped in this temple is the goddess Devi in her two forms as Moovanthikkali and Arayil Bhagavathi.

== Other deities (Upadevathas) ==
Other deities worshipped in the temple are Lord Ganapathi and Lord Ayyappa.

== Important days of the temple ==
- Paattulsavam
- Prathishta dina varshikam
- Pusthakapooja
- Thottam
