= Government Medical College, Kozhikode =

Medical school in Kerala, India

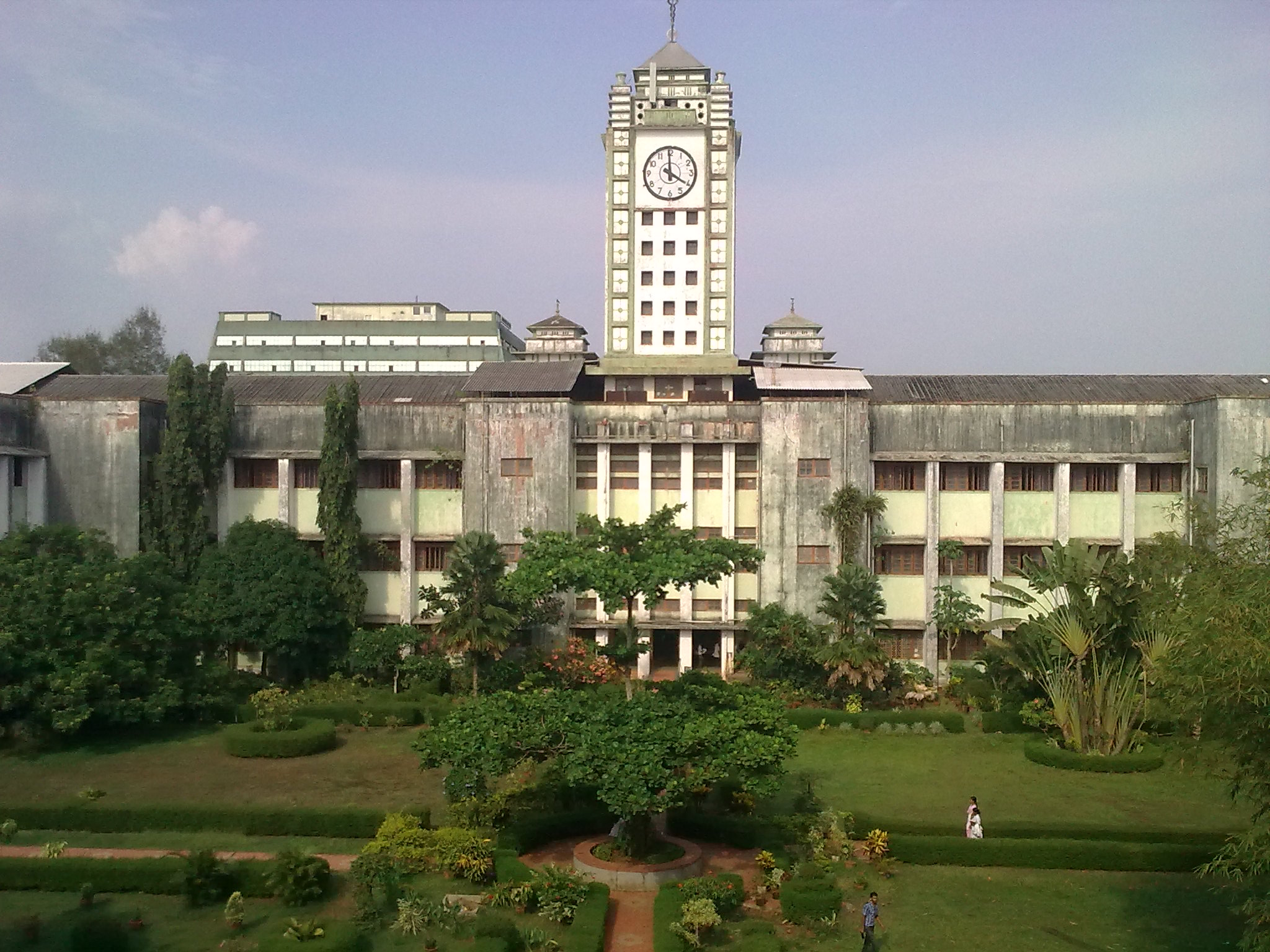
- Type: Public
- Established: 1957; 69 years ago
- Affiliations: National Medical Commission
- Academic affiliations: Kerala University of Health Sciences
- Principal: Dr. Sajeeth Kumar
- Location: Kozhikode, Kerala, India
- Campus: Suburban, 1.1 km^{2} (0.42 sq mi)
- Administration: Department of Health and Family Welfare, Government of Kerala
- Nickname: CMC
- Website: govtmedicalcollegekozhikode.ac.in

Government Medical College, Kozhikode is a public medical college in Kozhikode, in the Indian state of Kerala. It is one of the largest hospitals in India by area, covering more than 270 acres of land in the outskirts of Kozhikode. Two fifth of Kerala's population depends on the hospital for treatment.

== History ==
The medical college was established in 1957 as the second medical college in Kerala, on the initiative of A. R. Menon, then Minister for Health in the First Namboodiripad ministry. Its campus covers 270 acres on the outskirts of Kozhikode. Formerly affiliated to the University of Calicut, the college is now affiliated to the Kerala University of Health Sciences (KUHS).

== Publication ==
It publishes the Calicut Medical Journal. The Institute of Palliative Medicine of Kozhikode is part of it.

== Institutes ==
=== Institute of Maternal and Child Health ===
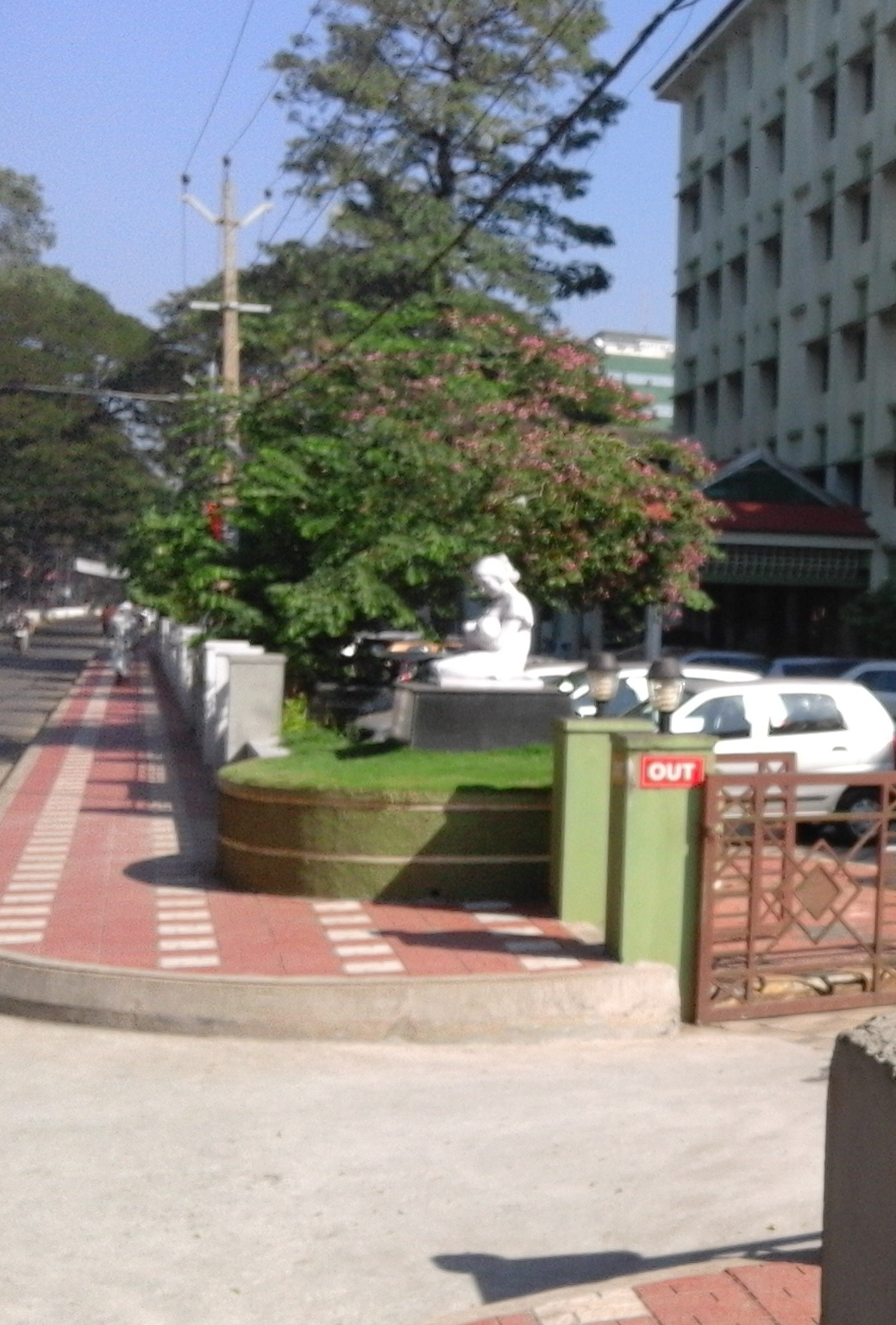
Institute of Maternal & Child Health

The Institute of Maternal and Child Health (IMCH) is a 1100 bed tertiary care center dedicated to maternal and child health care. The Institute of Maternal and Child Health of Medical College is a regional diagnostic centre for Primary Immunodeficiency Disorders. This collaborative centre provides clinical care as well as genetic diagnosis for patients with primary immunodeficiency disorders. This collaborative centre is part of the Genomics for Understanding Rare Diseases India Alliance Network (GUaRDIAN) Initiative.

=== Institute of Palliative Medicine ===
The Institute of Palliative Medicine (IPM) is a WHO collaborative centre for Community participation in Palliative Care and Long term Care It was initially set up in 1993, as a pain relief clinic for terminal cancer patients, run by Dr M. R. Rajagopal and Dr Suresh Kumar. Today, it is the nodal institution for palliative care in Kerala, providing training to doctors, nurses and volunteers. Since the vast majority of India's palliative care sites – 841 out of 908 – are located in Kerala, the Institute of Palliative Medicine leads the largest palliative care network in India.

=== Institute of Mental Health and Neurosciences ===
The Institute of Mental Health and Neurosciences (IMHANS) is an autonomous institute under the government of Kerala.

=== Government Women and Children hospital, Kozhikode ===
This was established in 1903 by Raja Sir Savalai Ramaswamy Mudaliar and was handed over to the Government on 22 September 1903.

== Notable alumni ==
The Kozhikode Medical College Alumni Association was established in 2003. The association publishes the Calicut Medical Journal, an online open access medical journal. The journal is indexed by CAB International. It was established to provide local physicians an opportunity to report their research findings to an international audience.

Notable alumni include:

- Azad Moopen, physician, Padma Shri (2011)
- K. C. Joseph, politician
- Khadija Mumtaz, author
- M. K. Muneer, former minister
- P. K. Sasidharan, Doctor, Author, Social activist, Educator
- Vinod Scaria, Indian Biologist, Medical Researcher

== See also ==
- History of Medical Education in Calicut
- Kovoor Town
- Kuttikkattoor
- Devagiri
