= Bhasi Malaparamba =

Indian sports journalist and footballer

- Born: 10 May 1941; Malaparamba, Kozhikode, Kerala, India
- Died: 3 November 2026 (aged 85); Malaparamba, Kozhikode, Kerala, India
- Occupations: Sports journalist, author, footballer
- Known for: Covering eight FIFA World Cups
- Awards: Best Foreign Journalist award, 2002 FIFA World Cup

Bhasi Malaparamba (10 May 1941 – 3 November 2026) was an Indian sports journalist, author and former footballer. He covered eight FIFA World Cups, from Spain in 1982 to Brazil in 2014, with official FIFA accreditation.

== Career ==
Bhasi was born on 10 May 1941 in Malaparamba, Kozhikode, to Chanthukutty and Chiruthakutty. He began playing football at an early age, after watching the Sait Nagjee Football Tournament. He played for district and club teams. He captained Kozhikode's Young Challengers Club. He appeared as a footballer and worked as a coach in the 1972 Malayalam film Football Champion. He was a civil engineer. He worked in the Public Works Department and retired in 1996. He worked with several Malayalam newspapers and Asianet TV. He worked as a freelance journalist. He covered seven of the World Cups for Malayala Manorama. He covered eight FIFA World Cups, from Spain in 1982 to Brazil in 2014, with official FIFA accreditation. He also reported from Euro 2008.

He interviewed Pelé, Bobby Moore, Bobby Charlton and Peter Shilton. He also met Franz Beckenbauer. He was a commentator at the Santosh Trophy, Nehru Cup and Nagjee Trophy tournaments. He also gave commentary for All India Radio. He received accreditation for the 2018 World Cup in Russia but did not travel, as his wife was ill. He was vice-president of the Kozhikode District Sports Council.

== Books ==
He wrote books on football and novels.

Books by Bhasi Malaparamba
Book	Details
Golden Goal	
World Cup Football: A Historical Overview	
Kozhikode's Sporting Heritage	
World Cup Football till Brazil 2014	
Jogo Bonito	
Panapathrathinte Kamuki	First novel, 1958
Neelathadakam	Novel
Manassukal Sagarangal	Novel
Vrinda	Novel

== Honours ==
He received an award for the best foreign journalist in Seoul during the 2002 World Cup. He also received recognition from the Sports Lovers Association in Thiruvananthapuram and a lifetime contribution award from the Sai Maam Foundation. He also won the Kerala Football Lovers Association award for best World Cup correspondent.

== Personal life and death ==
He was married to Parakkulangara Parvathy, an engineer, died prior to him. The couple had two sons, Sudheep and Praseeth. He died on 3 November 2026 at his home in Malaparamba, Kozhikode, aged 85.
