= St. Joseph's College, Devagiri =

College in Kozhikode, Kerala, India

St. Joseph's College (Autonomous), Devagiri
- Motto: Latin: Pro Deo Et Patria ("For God and Country")
- Established: 1956; 70 years ago
- Founders: CMI congregation
- Accreditation: Re-Accredited by NAAC (Cycle 4) A++ with a CGPA of 3.65
- Affiliations: University of Calicut
- Principal: Rev. Fr. Dr. Biju Joseph Chakkalayil CMI
- Location: Devagiri, Kozhikode, Kerala, India; 11.2653°N 75.8360°E
- Website: https://www.devagiricollege.org/

St. Joseph's College (Autonomous), Devagiri, also known as Devagiri College, is a college in Kozhikode, Kerala, India, offering graduation and postgraduation courses in arts and science. Students and alumni are called ‘Devagirians’. The college is in the Devagiri hills about 8 km east of Kozhikode city. It is run by the Carmelites of Mary Immaculate (CMI), an indigenous religious congregation founded in 1831. The college is ranked 60, in All India Ranking by National Institutional Ranking Framework during 2020.

== Rankings ==
The college is ranked 74th among colleges in India by the National Institutional Ranking Framework (NIRF) in 2025.

== History ==
Envisioned by the CMI congregation and established in 1956, St. Joseph's College was. inaugurated by the then-governor of Madras. The college added two postgraduate departments and a sports pavilion within five years of its inception. First affiliated to the University of Madras and then to the University of Kerala, the college is now under the University of Calicut.

Devagiri has turned out more than 200 toppers in university examinations and come out the university athletic champions 17 times.

== Academics ==
Devagiri had won 15 ranks in an academic year. With ten post-graduate departments. It has four research centres and wings offering M. G. University's off-campus programmes and courses recognized by DOEACC and ICAI. The college has won 150 first and second ranks since 1962. Nearly 100 students have passed the UGC-CSIR and JRF examinations.

1. Dept. of Economics
2. Dept. of English
3. Dept. of Functional & Applied English
4. Dept. of Language & Literature (SF)
5. Dept. of Malayalam
6. Dept. of Media Studies (SF)
7. Dept. of Botany
8. Dept. of Chemistry
9. Dept. of Computer Science (SF)
10. Dept. of Mathematical Sciences
11. Dept. of Mathematics
12. Dept. of Physics
13. Dept. of Psychology
14. Dept. of Statistics (SF)
15. Dept. of Zoology
16. Dept. of Business Management (SF)
17. Dept. of Commerce
18. Dept. of Commerce & Management (SF)
19. Dept. of Professional Studies
20. Dept. of Additional Languages
21. Dept. of Physical Education
22. Dept. of Second Languages
23. Dept. of Social Work (SF)

College rankings

General – India
- NIRF (Colleges) (2022): 59

== Sports ==
- K Abdul Rahiman, Volleyball, represented India in international championships
- Jose George, Volleyball, 1978 Asian Championship, 1991 Indian Team Coach
- Jimmy George, Volleyball, 1974, 1978 & 1986 Asian Games, 1977 Arjuna Award winner
- Pramod Govind, Basketball, 1971, Jr. Indian team
- M K Manuel, Volleyball, 1979 Asian Championship
- N C Chacko, Volleyball, 1982 Asian Games
- George Kuncheria, Athletics, 1986 Pre-Asian Track and Field Silver Medal in Triple Jump
- Robert Boby George, Athletics, represented India in Triple Jump, National Coach, Dronacharya Award Winner
- Saju George, Athletics, attended Long Jump Training Programme in the USA
- Sreesh T R, Volleyball/Beach Volley, 2003 Gold Medal in World Customs Beach Volley Championship
- Tinu Joseph, Basketball, 2003 Senior Asian Basketball Championship, Qualifying Round
- Kishore Kumar E K, Volleyball, since 1999 member of Indian Junior and Senior Teams. 2002, Junior Indian Team Captain; 2003, Senior Indian Team Captain; 2003, Captain Jr. team for the World Championship
- Sanave Thomas, Badminton, 2002 Thomas Cup England. 2002- Commonwealth Games at Manchester. 2003 World Championship – Birmingham.
- Liju K Abraham, Basketball, 2000 Junior Asian Championship at Kuala Lumpur.
- Usha Nandini, Handball, 2002 Indian Team Captain in the South Asian Championship at Dhaka. 1995 Best Player in SAF Games, 6 times represented India.
- Bobit Mathew, Basketball, 2000 Junior Asian Championship at Kuala Lumpur.
- Rajeev R, Volleyball, 2003- Senior Indian Team for the Matches held at Bulgaria, Romania and Czech Republic.
- Muralee Krishna A, Basketball, 2003 Senior Asian Basketball Championship at China
- Vinod S, Volleyball, 2000 Junior Asian Championship. 2003- Senior Indian Team for the matches held at Bulgaria, Romania and Czech Republic.
- Ratnakaran K, Chess, 2001 Junior Asian Championship at Tehran 3rd Place. Junior World Championship. 2004 won International Master Norm in Commonwealth Championship.
- AmruthaRaj, Weightlifting, Asian Power Lifting Championship – Silver Medal. World Power Lifting Championship – 9th place
- Sethumadhavan, Football, Meracca Cup

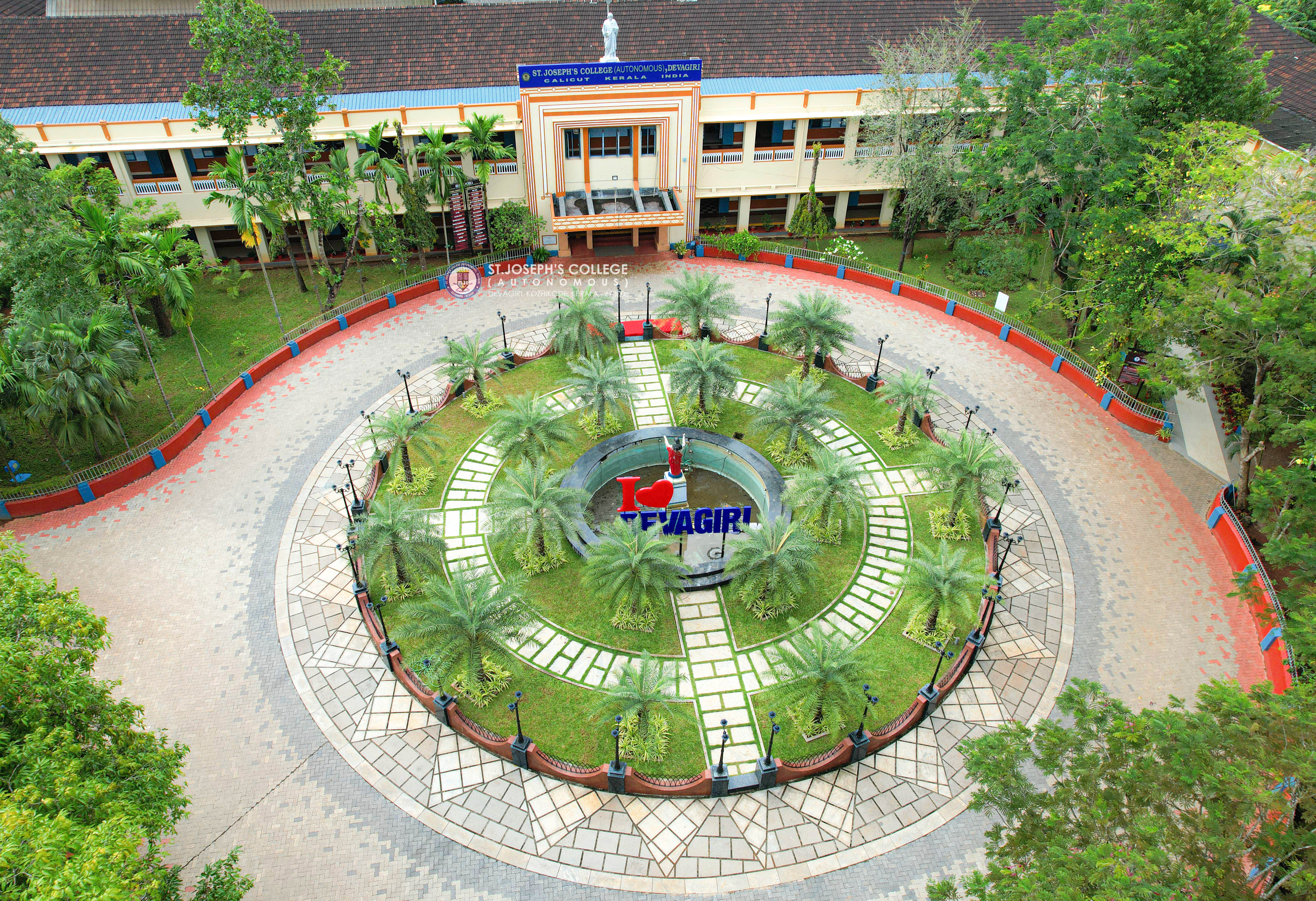

== Facilities ==
The six-acre campus of sprawling greenery houses a nursery, a higher secondary school, schools for the physically and mentally challenged, men's and women's hostels, staff quarters and a chapel. The institution has an eight-lane track stadium, an auditorium and an open-air theatre, a computerized library (one of the biggest in Kerala) of about 8,000 books and journals, 47 computers installed in departments and laboratories, and Internet facility. About half of the 75 permanent teachers are PhDs or rank holders. More than a score of forums and clubs supplement the effort of the teachers.

== Recognition ==
St. Joseph's College, Devagiri is an autonomous college. It has autonomy in all academic matters and from the stage of admission to the conduct of examination to the publication of results. In January 2011, NAAC accredited the college with Grade A (CGPA 3.63). In 2016, the college was re-accredited as the first college to be awarded with A++ grade in the Country with a CGPA of 3.76 on a four-point scale. UGC recognized it as 'College with Potential for Excellence'.

Devagiri College is the topmost NAAC-accredited college in Kerala with the highest CGPA. It is for achievements of this sort that a survey conducted by India Today zeroed in on Devagiri as one of the best ten colleges in Kerala; SS Music Channel, Chennai singled out Devagiri for a special episode telecast in 2004. The college is today considered to be one of the top ten best arts and science colleges in Kerala.

== Notable faculty and alumni ==
- Dr. Sukumar Azhikode, Writer, Social critic, orator
- P. Krishna Prasad, MLA.
- Mathai Chacko, Ex MLA.
- Jimmy George, volleyball player
- Vishnunarayanan Namboothiri, poet, writer
- P. S. Nivas, cinematographer, film director, producer
- Ranjan Pramod, film director
- Girish Puthenchery, Malayalam lyricist
- Vinod Scaria, Scientist
- T Siddique, MLA
- P. P. Sreedharanunni, Poet
- Sudheesh, Actor
- Sreedhanya Suresh, IAS
- Vineeth, actor

== See also ==
- Education in India
- Education in Kerala
- Kovoor Town
- Kuttikkattoor
- Calicut Medical College
- List of institutions of higher education in Kerala
- List of colleges affiliated to the University of Calicut

== Image gallery ==
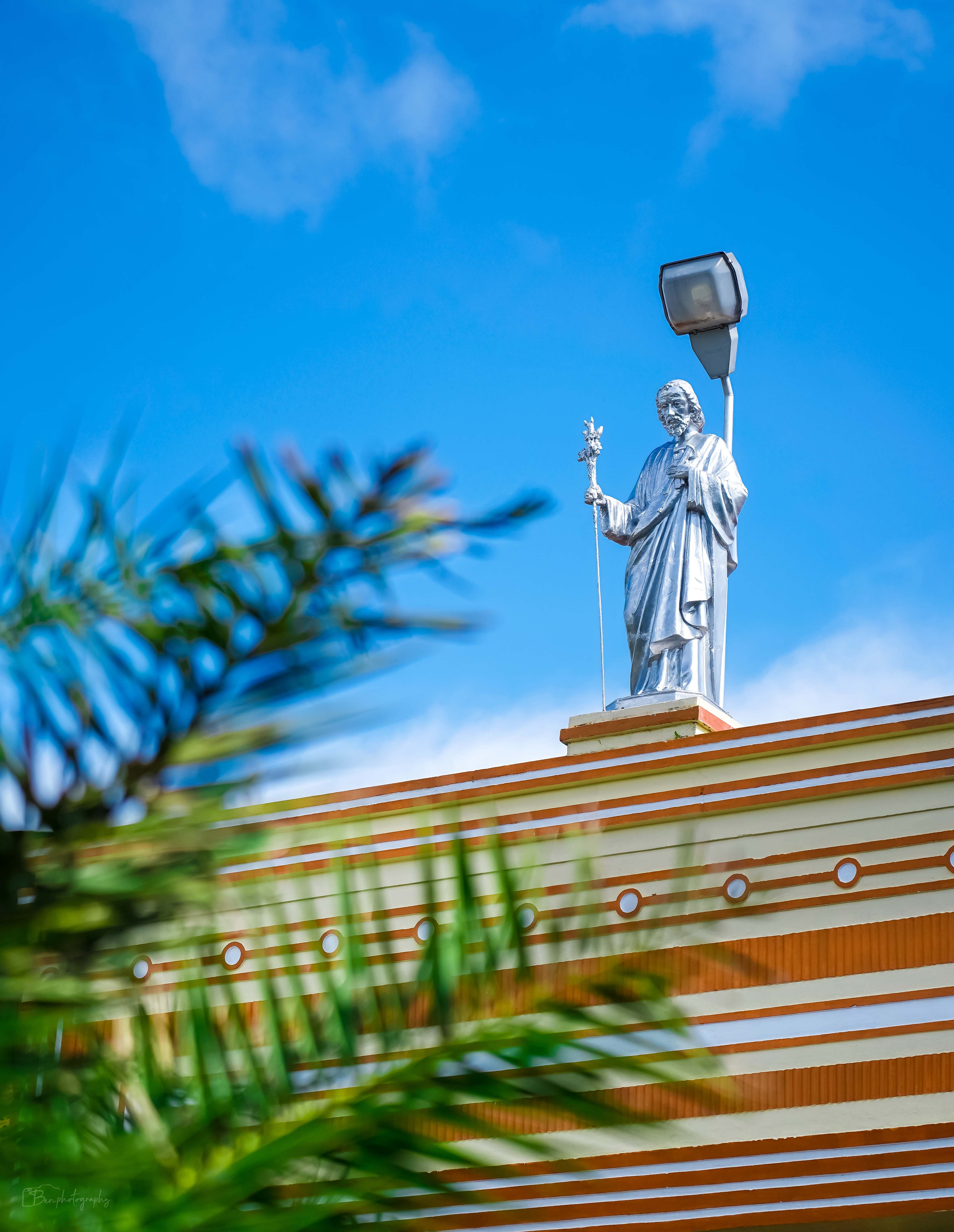
Statue

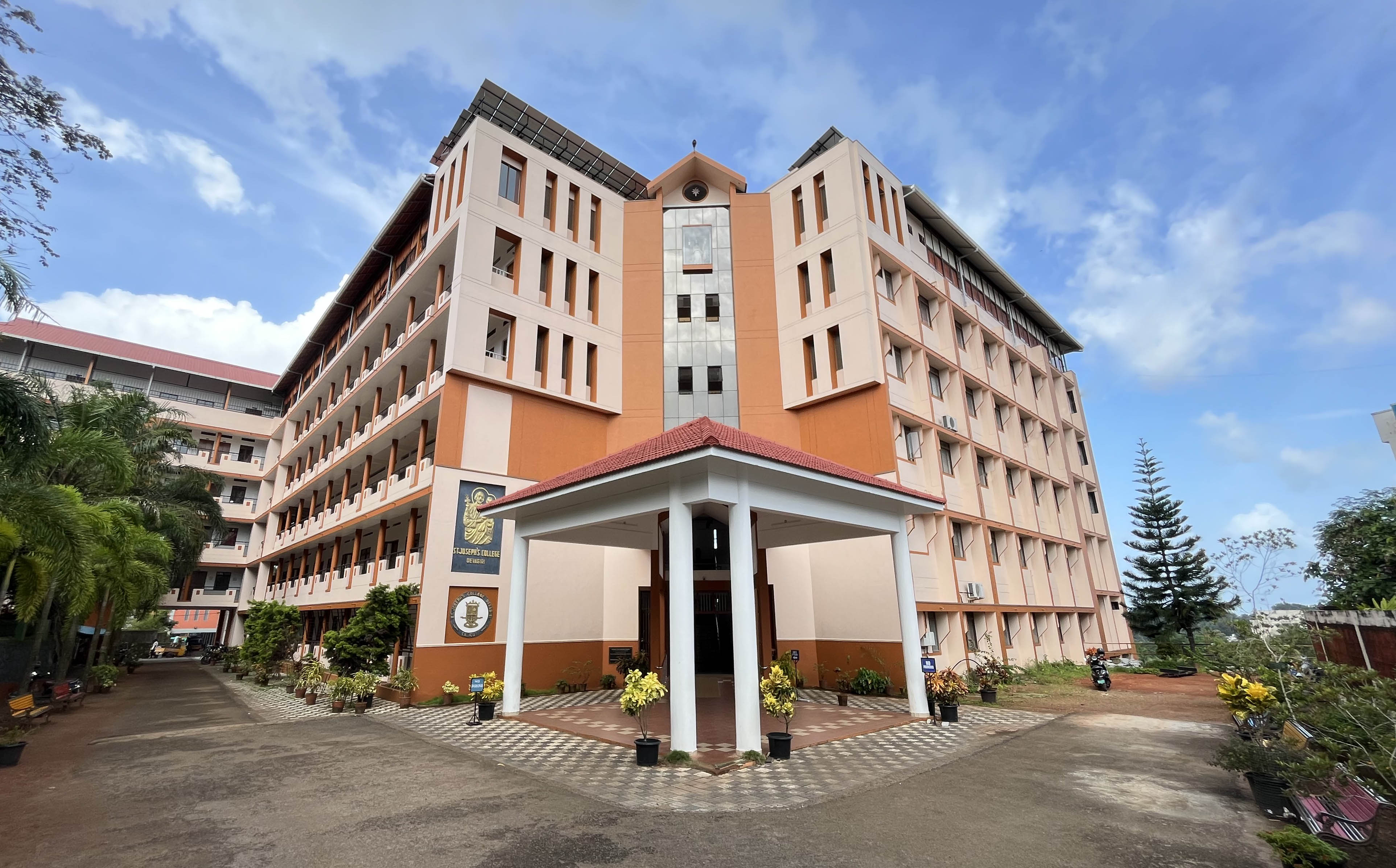
Self Finance

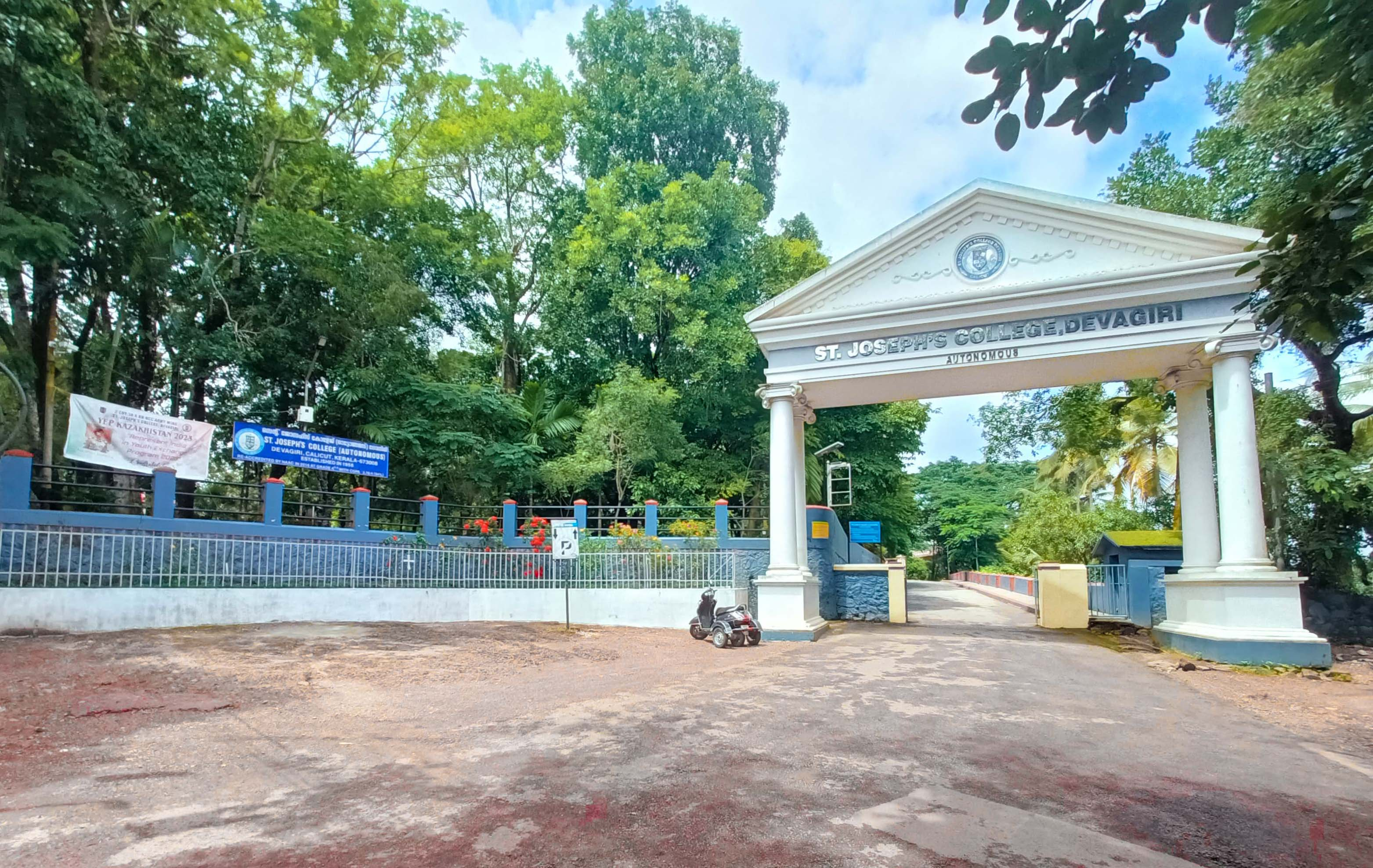
Front Gate

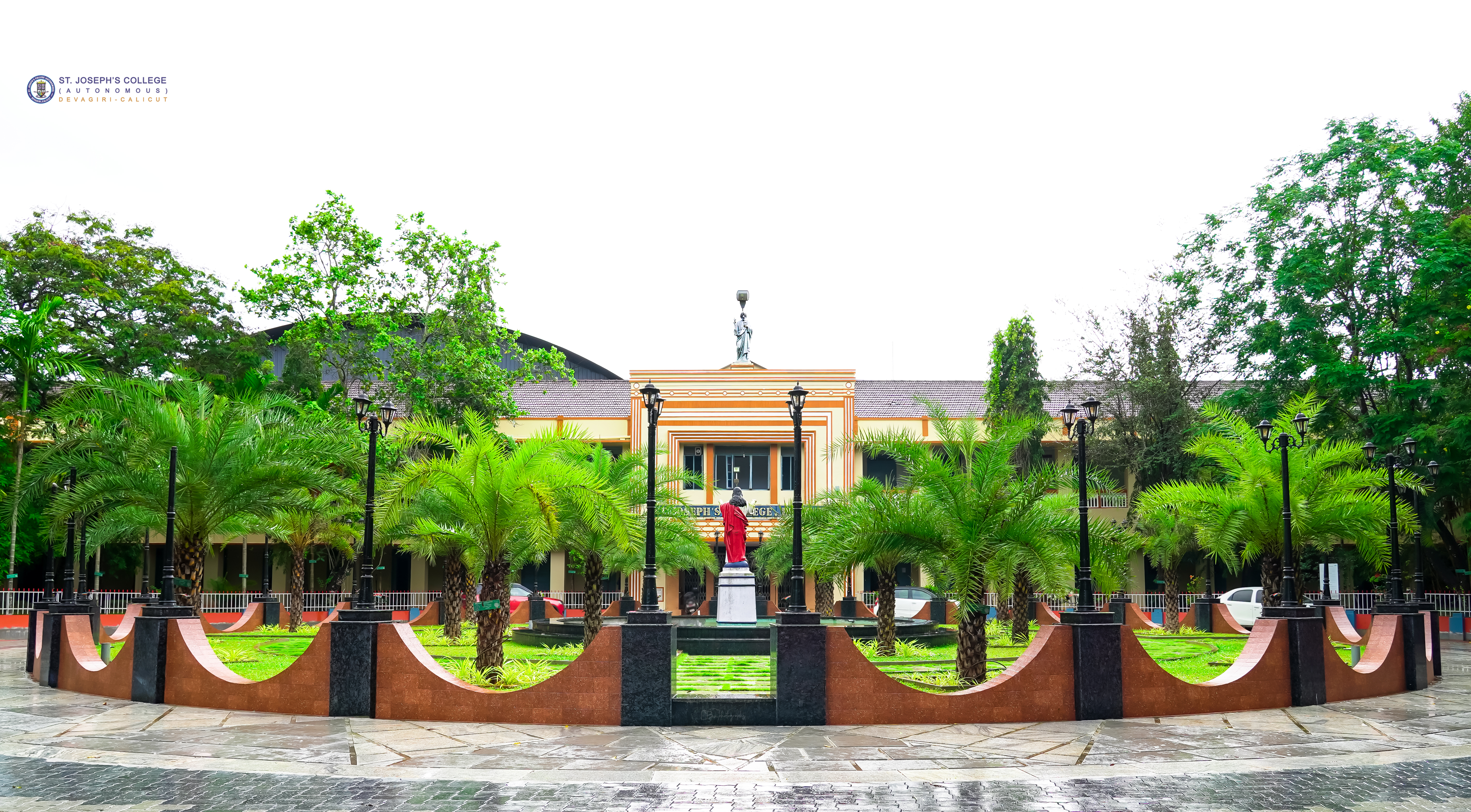
A Block

== In popular culture ==
- Sidiqe-Lal directed blockbuster 1991 film Godfather (1991) starring Mukesh, all the law college scenes in the film shooting take place in Devagiri St. Joseph's College, Kozhikode.
