= Kayalam =

Coordinates: 11°14′50.7″N 75°55′2.7″E

- Village
- Interactive map of Kayalam
- Country: India
- State: Kerala
- District: Kozhikode

Languages
  - Official: Malayalam, English
- Time zone: UTC+5:30 (IST)
- PIN: 673661
- Telephone code: 91 -495 249 xx xx
- Vehicle registration: KL 11

Kayalam is a suburb of the Peruavayal Panchayath within the Kozhikode district in the Indian state of Kerala. Bordering Kayalam is the Chaliyar River and the Perumanna, Mavoor and Mundumuzhi villages. The Kavanakallu Regulator Bridge is near Kayalam.

== Culture ==
Samskara poshini vayanasala and KASC kayalam are two organisations which encourage cultural and religious harmony in kayalam. Keleswaram sree Uma Maheswara Temple is an oldest temple in kayalam

== Educational institutions ==
- Kayalam ALP School
- Islamic Center Public Nursery School
- Ideal Nursery School

== Industries ==
- Vimala Rubber Plantation, Kayalam
- Kayalam Brick Company
