= Silver Hills School =

School in Kerala, India

Coordinates: 11.2961°N 75.8129°E

Silver Hills Public School

Information
- Founded: 1975
- Principal: Rev. Fr Binoy K Francis CMI
- Website: Silver Hills Institutions

Silver Hills Public School, Kozhikode, is a Christian minority institution under the management of CMI Fathers of St. Thomas Province, Kozhikode, who run several educational institutions at all levels in India and abroad. The CMI society was founded by St Kuriakose Elias Chavara. The school offers 10+2 year pattern of education under both the Kerala state syllabus and also the C.B.S.E. syllabus with recognition up to class XII. The patron of the school is St Kuriakose Elias Chavara. The school has about 1,500 students and 65 teachers.

Two institutions constitute Silver Hills School - Silver Hills Higher Secondary School and Silver Hills Public School, with state and C.B.S.E. syllabus respectively. The principal of the former is Fr. John Mannarathara, while the latter is headed by Fr. Mathew Kalapurayil.

In 2005 and 2007, the school won C.B.S.E. Kalotsav, a cultural festival organised by Sahodaya Schools Complex of Malabar Region.

== Notable alumni ==
- Vinod Scaria, genomics scientist
