= Kovoor Town =

Kovoor
- Town
- Location in Kerala, India
- Coordinates: 11°18′23″N 75°52′44″E
- Country: India
- State: Kerala
- Region: South India
- District: Kozhikode

Population
  - Total: 47,396

Languages
  - Official: Malayalam
- Time zone: UTC+5:30 (IST)
- PIN: 673008
- Nearest city: Kozhikode
- Lok Sabha constituency: Kozhikode
- Vidhan Sabha constituency: Kunnamangalam

Kovoor Town is a suburb of Kozhikode city on the eastern side.

== See also ==
- Kuttikkattoor
- Devagiri
- Calicut Medical College
- Chevayur
- Palazhi
- Silver Hills

== Image gallery ==
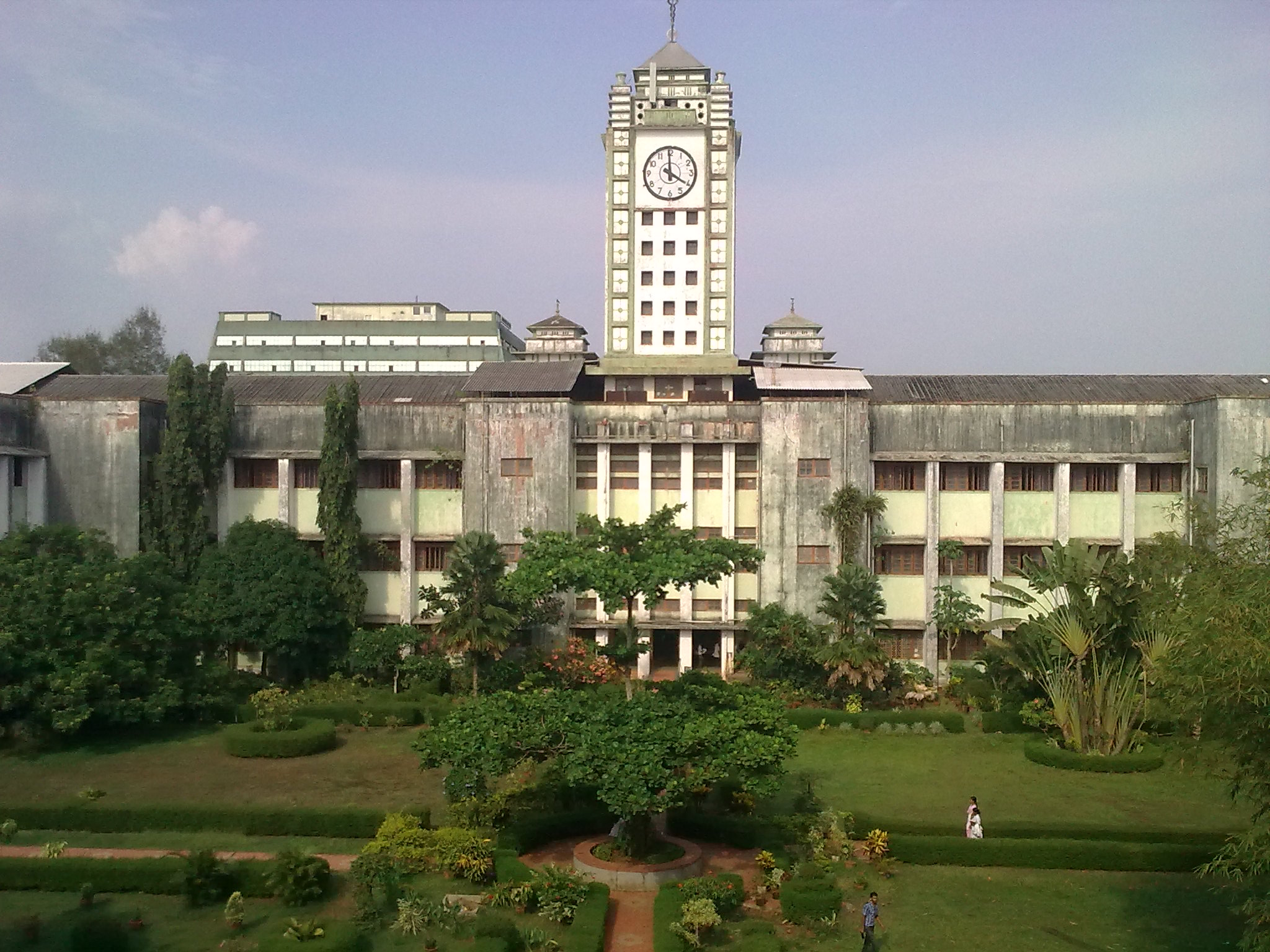
View from inside the medical college

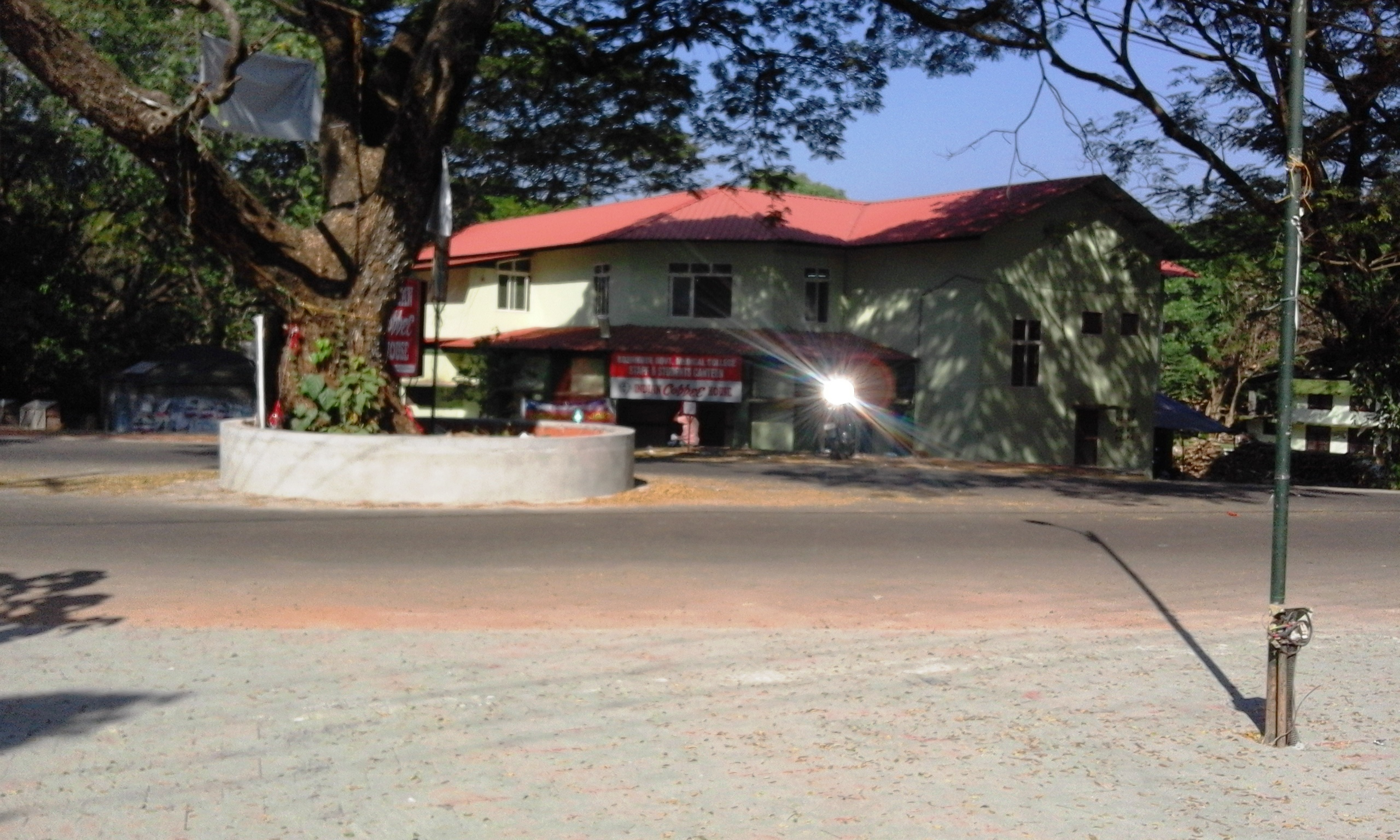
Coffee House at Medical College

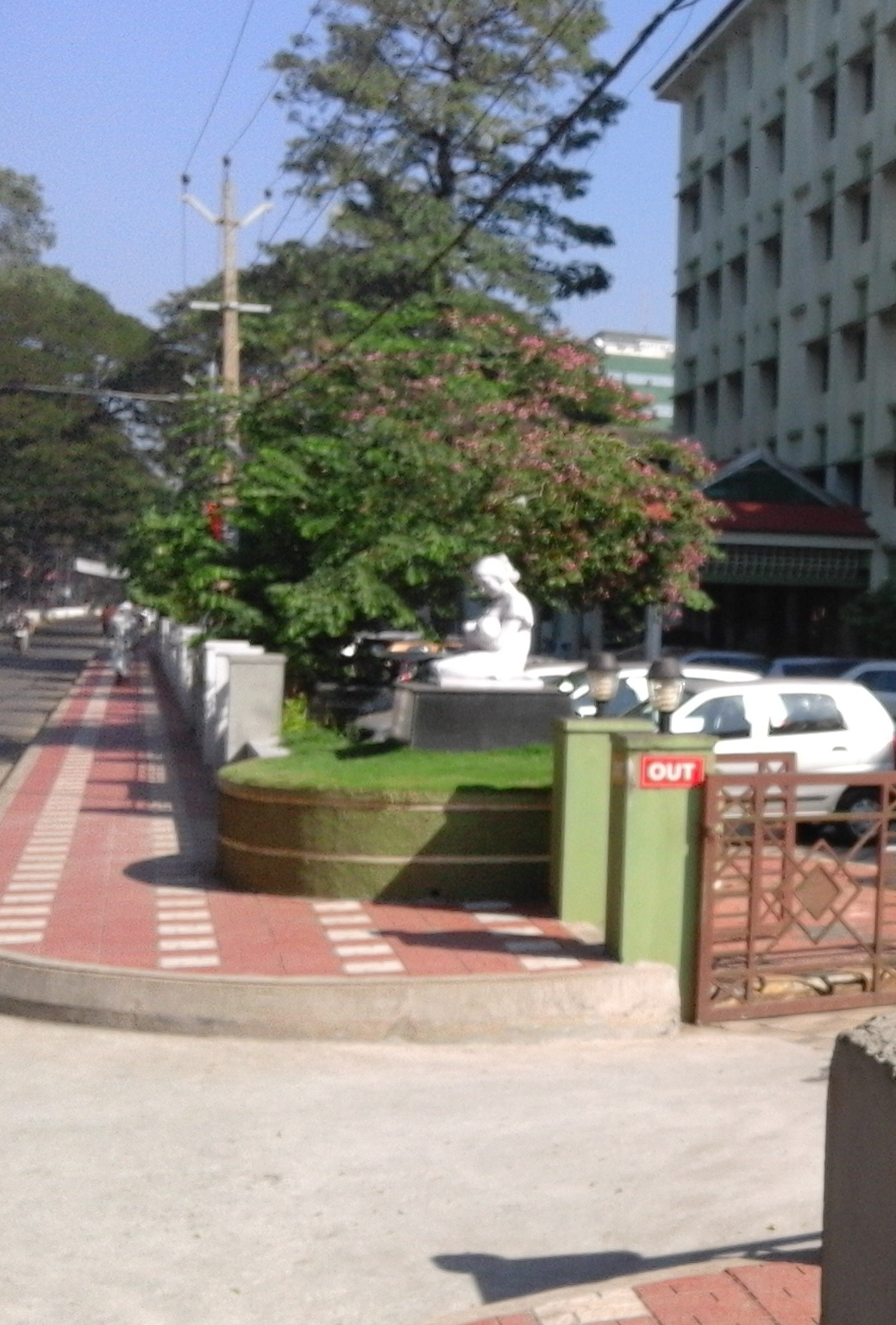
Maternity Hospital at Chevayoor

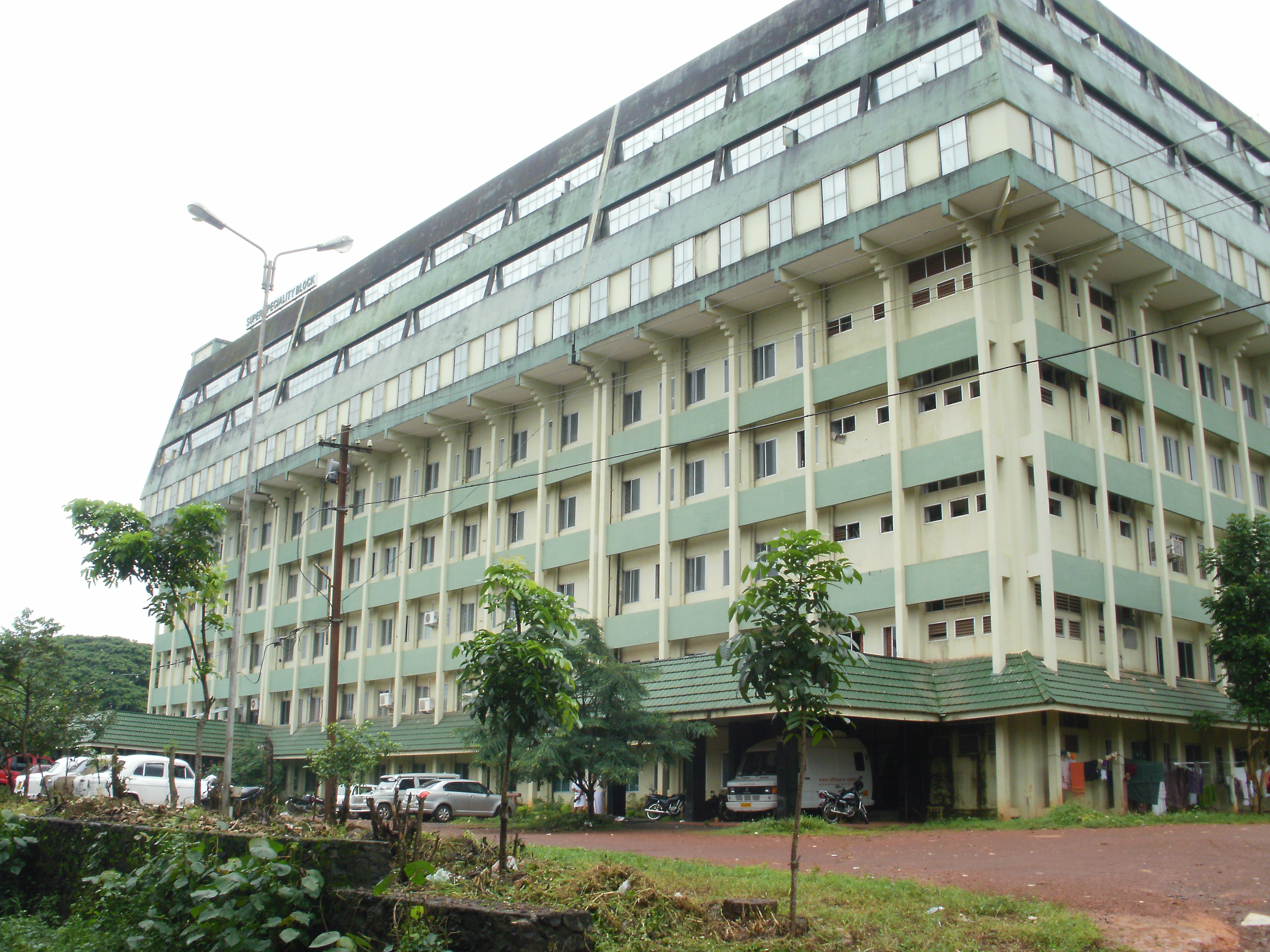
Super Speciality Hospital
