= Institute of Mental Health and Neurosciences =

Indian research institute

- Motto: tamaso mā jyotirgamaya
- Motto in English: Lead me from darkness to light
- Type: Public
- Established: 1983
- Affiliations: Kerala University of Health Sciences; NBE
- Director: P. Krishnakumar
- Location: Kozhikode, Kerala, India; 11°16′45″N 75°50′40″E
- Campus: Urban
- Website: imhans.ac.in

Institute of Mental Health and Neurosciences (IMHANS) is an Indian autonomous institute in Kozhikode under the Government of Kerala. The permanent campus of the institute is situated adjacent to the Government Medical College, Kozhikode.

The institution was set up through a government order in 1983 and was chosen to be a centre for excellence by the Government of India in 2009. The institution leads the Community mental health services in the state of Kerala with support from the Kerala State Mental Health Programme.

== Education ==
IMHANS is a teaching hospital with postgraduate programmes in mental health. The academic programme is affiliated with the Kerala University of Health Sciences. Additionally M.Phil. programmes in Clinical Psychology and Psychiatric Social work are offered. The institution also offers a specialized post-basic diploma programme in Psychiatric Nursing.

== Research ==
The Institute of Mental Health and Neurosciences has a state of art molecular laboratory with infrastructure for molecular assays including real-time polymerase chain reaction equipment, Capillary Sequencer, and other instruments required for bioinformatics, biochemical and neurophysiology studies. A recent agreement with the Institute of Genomics and Integrative Biology aimed at developing a laboratory for molecular genetics diagnosis and research is on the anvil. This initiative aims to develop the Neuroscience Research laboratory at the institute into a centre of excellence in genetic diseases.
