= Vinod Scaria =

Indian biochemist

Dr Vinod Scaria
- Born: 9 March 1981 (age 45); Mbinga, Tanzania
- Citizenship: Indian
- Education: Kozhikode Medical College; University of Pune
- Awards: CSIR Young Scientist Award (2012); FRSB (2017)
- Scientific career
- Fields: Bioinformatics, Computational Biology
- Workplaces: Indraprastha Institute of Information Technology Delhi, Institute of Genomics and Integrative Biology, Academy of Scientific and Innovative Research
- Doctoral advisor: Samir K. Brahmachari
- Website: vinodscaria.rnabiology.org

Dr Vinod Scaria FRSB, FRSPH (born 9 March 1981) is an Indian biologist, medical researcher pioneering in Precision Medicine and Clinical Genomics in India. He is best known for sequencing the first Indian genome. He was also instrumental in the sequencing of The first Sri Lankan Genome, analysis of the first Malaysian Genome sequencing and analysis of the Wild-type strain of Zebrafish and the IndiGen programme on Genomics for Public Health in India.

He is presently the Chief Data Officer at Karkinos Healthcare and an adjunct professor at the IIT Kanpur. He was previously a senior scientist at CSIR Institute of Genomics and Integrative Biology and an adjunct faculty at Indraprastha Institute of Information Technology, Delhi.

He along with his colleague and collaborator Sridhar Sivasuubu are widely regarded as the pioneers in the area of clinical genomics in India. They are also the co-founders of the Genomics for Understanding Rare Diseases India Alliance Network (GUaRDIAN) a large clinical network working in the area of Rare Disease Genomics in India. They were also instrumental in setting up a comprehensive fellowship programme in genomics for clinicians

His research has also contributed to a number of commercially viable technologies for healthcare and public health applications. This includes one of the methods for fast and accurate diagnosis and screening of mitochondrial genetic diseases.

== Early life ==
Scaria was born in Tanzania in 1981. He did his schooling in Silver Hills Public School, Kozhikode, India. He studied for pre-degree course in St. Joseph's College, Devagiri and completed his undergraduate studies in medicine and surgery from Calicut Medical College with gold medals in Biochemistry and Physiology. He worked as a consultant for information technology at the Pain and Palliative Care society in Kozhikode. Later, he joined the CSIR Institute of Genomics and Integrative Biology, New Delhi, where he started his career as a researcher.

== Research ==
Scaria started his research career at Kozhikode Medical College in the area of medical ethics and health information on Internet. After joining the CSIR Institute of Genomics and Integrative Biology in 2005, he switched to computational biology and genome informatics. His notable researches include the identification of human micro-RNA which can target HIV virus. In 2009 he and his colleagues at the Institute of Genomics and Integrative Biology announced the sequencing of the wild-type strain of zebrafish and the sequencing of the first Human Genome from India. He also pioneered the use of social web for genome annotation, through mapping of TB genome. Scaria and colleagues also discovered and designed enzyme silencers for mRNA, dubbed antagomirzymes. His group also pioneered the use of social web, cloud computing and students for solving complex drug discovery problems for Neglected Diseases. Dr Scaria has also been involved in popularising personal genomics through meragenome.com and OpenPGx.

His research took a shift to Clinical Genomics in 2009 starting with the sequencing of the first Indian Genome in 2009. Over years he with colleague, Sridhar Sivasubbu created a large research network in area of Clinical Genomics with focus on rare genetic diseases and pharmacogenomics. The focus has been to use genomic tools to understand the molecular basis of genetic diseases in India and use this knowledgebase to develop affordable and accessible genetic tests. This initiative helped uncover the genetic basis of many inherited diseases in India

His research has also led to know-how which has been successfully licensed to a number of commercial diagnostic entities and available to clinicians across India.

He has published over 150 papers in international journals. He is also the editorial board member of many reputed International Journals including PLOS ONE, PeerJ, International Journal of Rheumatic Diseases and Journal of Translational Medicine. He was a member of senate of the Academy of Scientific and Innovative Research (AcSIR).

== Accolades ==
He was conferred the CSIR Young Scientist Award for biological sciences for developing computational tools to analyse genomic data, by the Prime Minister of India in September 2012.

He is a Kavli Frontiers of Science Fellow of the US National Academy of Sciences, an elected Fellow of the Royal Society of Biology and elected Fellow of the Royal Society of Public Health.

== Precision Medicine and Pharmacogenomics in India ==
He specialises in genome-scale data for Precision Medicine with reference to Pharmacogenetics. He was one of the pioneers to be able to systematically analyse personal genome data to derive pharmacogenetic maps. His research into population-specific genome scale data has provided one of the initial pharmacoepigenetic maps for Malaysia and Qatar. He research also contributed to the first population-scale pharmacogenomic maps for India.

Scaria has been pioneering the application of genomics to diagnose and solve rare genetic diseases in India, including discovering novel variants. He, with his colleague Sridhar Sivasubbu co-founded a national network (GUaRDIAN) of clinicians and researchers working on rare disease genomics. He also co-authored a handbook on exome sequencing and analysis for clinicians. The GUaRDIAN consortium includes over 250 clinicians and researchers from over 70 medical and research centers making it one of the largest clinical genomics research networks in India working in the area of Rare Genetic Diseases. The research network has been quite successful in understanding variants associated with rare genetic diseases and be able to prevent them.

His lab has also contributed to one of the most comprehensive evidence resources for mutation specific therapies in cancer

Genomics and other Omics Technologies to enable Medical Decisions (GOMED) Scaria has been involved in creating a program along with his colleague Dr Mohammed Faruq which enable clinicians from across the country to tap into the vast data of CSIR Institute of Genomics and Integrative Biology in the area of genomics to enable fast and effective diagnosis of genetic diseases. This programis now widely utilized by hospitals across the country.

The IndiGen programme on population Genomics for public health was initiated in 2019 with an attempt to start understanding the genetic diversity of the country by sequencing over a thousand Indian individuals."The outcomes of IndiGen will have applications in a number of areas including faster and efficient diagnosis of rare genetic diseases", said Union Science Minister, Harsh Vardhan, at the press conference announcing the programme. The programme has accelerated the commercial adaptation and application of genomics in India by working closely with various industrial partners. The summary data from the programme is available for researchers and clinicians.

== Genomics of Arab and Middle Eastern Populations ==
Scaria has been pioneering the analysis of genomic data from Arab, Middle Eastern populations. His lab contributed to understanding the genetic landscape of Pharmacogenetics in Qatar. He also pioneered the use of whole genome data to understand the genetic epidemiology of prevalent diseases in the region, including Familial Mediterranean Fever.

His lab also created one of the largest and comprehensive allele frequency resource for Arab populations. This database al mena(alleles for Middle East and North Africa) provides information on over 26 million variants indexing a number of whole genome and exome datasets from the region. He is also pioneering the creation of a comprehensive resource for disease variants in the Arab population, in collaboration with multiple researchers from the region. He also pioneered the application of genomics in transfusion medicine with the alnasab database, a comprehensive resource for blood group variants in Arabs

== Open Research, Data and Resources for tracking and understanding Epidemics ==
The COVID-19 Open Research, Data and Resources is an initiative to make relevant Data, Research and Resources at the Vinod Scaria Lab at the CSIR Institute of Genomics and Integrative Biology (CSIR-IGIB) in an open format to ensure that they are widely accessible as well as relevant. The initiative provides ready access to genomic, epidemiological data-sets and protocols pertaining to the COVID-19 epidemic in India. The research also contributed to the understanding of a new clade (I/A3i) of SARS-CoV-2 genomes from India. His group also contributed to uncovering the first reports of COVID-19 reinfection in India and a comprehensive resource on reinfections. He also pioneered research into the genomic characterization of COVID-19 vaccine breakthrough infections. His research also reviewed the risk of monogenic diseases in COVID-19. He has also been instrumental in creating a comprehensive genomic surveillance programme for SARS-CoV-2 in the state of Kerala which has been able to provide early insights into variants and influencing policy. His group also pioneered the EpidemicWatch network and the first participatory digital infection surveillance system Infectiradar in India.

The recent Zika virus outbreak in Kerala has seen Open research approaches to track and understand the epidemic as part of a framework for Citizen science
