= P. K. Sasidharan =

Indian medical academic

P. K. Sasidharan (PKS)
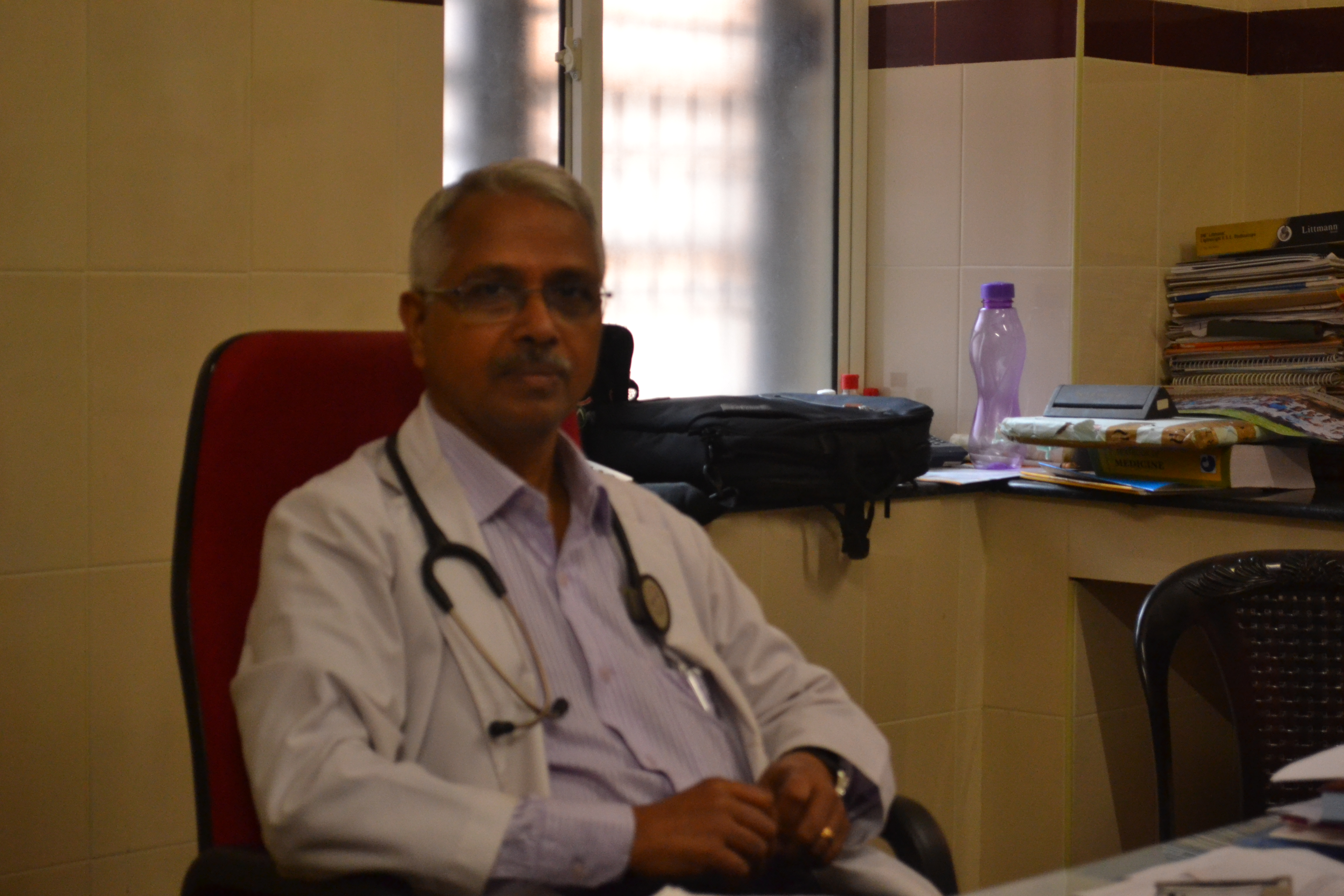
- Born: Kerala, India
- Education: Government Medical College, Kozhikode, PGIMER
- Spouse: Dr. Jyothi
- Children: Ashok Sasidharan, Vyshakh Sasidharan
- Medical career
- Profession: doctor, medical teacher, author, social activist, educator
- Field: Internal medicine, Hematology
- Institutions: Government Medical College, Kozhikode
- Sub-specialties: Internal medicine
- Research: Nutrition, life style disorders, clinical hematology

P. K. Sasidharan (Sasidharan Puthenpurakkal Kunhumon) is an Indian professor, medical practitioner, medical teacher and author from Kozhikode, Kerala. He retired as the Professor and Head of the Department of Internal Medicine and the division of Clinical Hematology at Calicut Medical College in 2015. He had held academic positions like the Dean faculty of Medicine of the University of Calicut and the chairman of PG board of studies at the Kerala University of Health Science (KUHS). He served as the PhD research Guide for University of Calicut during his tenure at Calicut

He is known for authoring the books Doctors' Pocket Companion, a text book for clinical practitioners and Heal-Thy India, which is a collection of observations regarding the healthcare system in India. He has recently authored a book entitled 'Guide to Clinical Practice in the Post Covid World' which is a collection of rare case histories, discussing on the need to change the way clinical practice has to be changed in future, besides these he had contributed chapters in medical textbooks and has many research publications.

== Education ==
Dr. PK Sasidharan born and brought up in a rural, agricultural background, graduated with a degree in medicine and surgery from Kozhikode Medical College as the best outgoing student in 1982. He did his MD in general medicine from PGIMER, Chandigarh. Being concerned about the health care situation in his home state, he returned to Kozhikode Medical College and started working as a medical teacher and doctor in the government medical college Calicut where he did hid his undergraduate medical education. He continued to work there, till he retired form government service.

== Research and publications ==
Prof. Sasidharan has published several research papers, the most prominent among them being the landmark study on Vitamin D deficiency in Tuberculosis which established the link between malnutrition, tuberculosis and vitamin D deficiency. His study was the first of its kind which documented the widespread deficiency of Vitamin D in India. Another was a landmark study on SLE, which established haematological manifestations as the commonest clinical presentation of SLE -and he developed new criteria for diagnosing SLE- The Kozhikode Criteria. Besides these, there are original studies on B12 deficiency, reversal of diabetes, reversal of nonalcoholic fatty liver disease, essential hypertension, metabolic syndrome and secondary polycythemia.

He has authored books on healthcare, arogyaparipalanathinte kanapurangal, samagra arogya samrakshanam enthu engine, Aarogyam Janangalilekku (Healthcare for the masses) and Jeevitha Sailium Aarogya Samrakshanavum (Lifestyle and healthcare) in Malayalam language.
