= Pallium India =

- Founded: 2003
- Founder: Dr. M. R. Rajagopal
- Type: Non-governmental charitable trust
- Location: Trivandrum, India
- Region served: India
- Website: palliumindia.org

Pallium India is a national registered charitable trust formed in 2003 aimed at providing quality palliative care and effective pain relief for patients in India. Dr. M. R. Rajagopal is the founder and chairman of Pallium India. The organization works with national and international organisations to improve the accessibility and affordability of pain relief drugs (opioids) and other low-cost medicines, to ensure the availability of palliative care services in India and to improve the quality of palliative care services provided by the healthcare and allied health care professionals. In February 2016, Pallium India was accredited by Social Justice Department of Government of Kerala.

== Activities ==
Pallium India seeks to insure equitable access to effective pain relief and quality palliative care alongside disease–specific treatment through delivery of services, education, building capacities, policy, research, advocacy and information.

Pallium India concentrates its activities on areas inadequately addressed by existing organizations. Pallium India works with Central and State Governments of India for integrating palliative care into the healthcare system, facilitating palliative care education and improving access to essential and affordable medicines like morphine and other opioids.

In 2017, Pallium India opened a library dedicated to palliative care. Books were donated by the Elisabeth Kübler-Ross Foundation and Dr. Odette Spruyt of Peter MacCallum Cancer Centre.

Pallium India runs home visit programs in and around Trivandrum, as well as inpatient and outpatient clinics in collaboration with different hospitals in Trivandrum. Other services include bereavement support groups, Vocational Rehabilitation Program for patients and families and education of children whose parents are under treatment by Pallium India. Services to poor patients are provided free of cost, expenses met by donations.

The Trivandrum Institute of Palliative Sciences (TIPS) is an organ of Pallium India, established in 2006. In 2012, TIPS was declared a World Health Organization Collaborating Centre (WHOCC) for Training and Policy on Access to Pain Relief. Education and research are major activities of TIPS. TIPS provides medical care (inpatient, out-patient and home care services), counselling care, rehabilitation and other supportive services.

The Bruce Davis Training Centre (BDTC), the training division of Pallium India, runs a number of programs and trainings throughout the year with a focus on general awareness among the public and the expertise and competency of healthcare and allied healthcare professionals. These include Certificate Course in Pain and Palliative Medicine (CCPPM) for doctors, in Palliative Nursing (CCPN) for nurses and in Palliative Care (CCPC) for allied healthcare professionals. There are also volunteer training programs conducted frequently.

Pallium India works with several hospitals and organizations to catalyse the development of palliative care centres across India and for introducing palliative care education to professionals.

Pallium India collaborates with the Department of Social Justice of Government of Kerala to improve the facilities for wheelchair-using people in the state. This includes providing rehabilitation services and advocacy for their improved mobility, including creating pavements and buildings that are wheelchair-friendly. Pallium India regularly organizes awareness programs for the public, get-together for patients, art and craft exhibition, food festival and cultural events to spread the message of palliative care.

Pallium India works with Paediatric and Paediatric Neurology departments of S.A.T Hospital, Thiruvananthapuram to provide palliative care for children suffering from various illnesses. Pallium India works out of its office at Thiruvananthapuram, Kerala, India.

Currently, Pallium India is advocating for a rational national legislation for end of life care, which allows natural death with dignity and in incurable diseases with access to palliative care, rather than intensive care.

== Achievements ==
Pallium India played a major role in the steps leading to the declaration of a National Program on Palliative care by the Government of India in 2012 November and the Amendment of Narcotic Drugs and Psychotropic Substances(NDPS) Act of India in 2014. In 2008, Pallium India initiated and followed up a proposal that resulted in the declaration of a "Palliative Care Policy" by the Government of Kerala, making it the first Government in a developing country to have such a policy.

In 2016, Pallium India was awarded the Cancer Aid Society Annual Award for Excellence and Leadership in Palliative Care for the South Asian Association for Regional Cooperation (SAARC) Countries. In November 2017, Pallium India was awarded Sat Paul Mittal Award of appreciation, in Ludhiana.

A group of palliative care experts under the leadership of Dr M R Rajagopal, collaborated to prepare the draft curriculum for M.D. Palliative Medicine, on behalf of Medical Council of India. A curriculum that introduces palliative care to undergraduate medical and nursing education has been submitted to the Medical Council of India.

Pallium India has catalyzed the development of training centres offering quality education in palliative care in Trivandrum (TIPS), Hyderabad (MNJIO RCC), Jaipur (Bhagwan Mahaveer Cancer Hospital and Research Centre) and Ahmedabad (GCRI).

With financial support from international agencies, ten palliative care service centres were established in different states of India - Jharkhand, Tripura, Uttar Pradesh, Manipur, Mizoram, Bihar, Orissa, Gujarat, Meghalaya, Tamil Nadu and Lakshadweep. In collaboration with Australasian Palliative Link International (APLI), Pallium India developed a mentoring program called Project Hamrahi for budding palliative care organizations in India

Working with national and international experts, Pallium India created the National Standards tool (Minimum Standards for Palliative Care Programs) to ensure quality palliative care.

An advocacy tool initiated by Pallium India with two international partners, called 'the Morphine Manifesto', caught the attention of the international palliative care community so much that 63 international organizations signed up to be launch partners.
