= Marikkunnu =

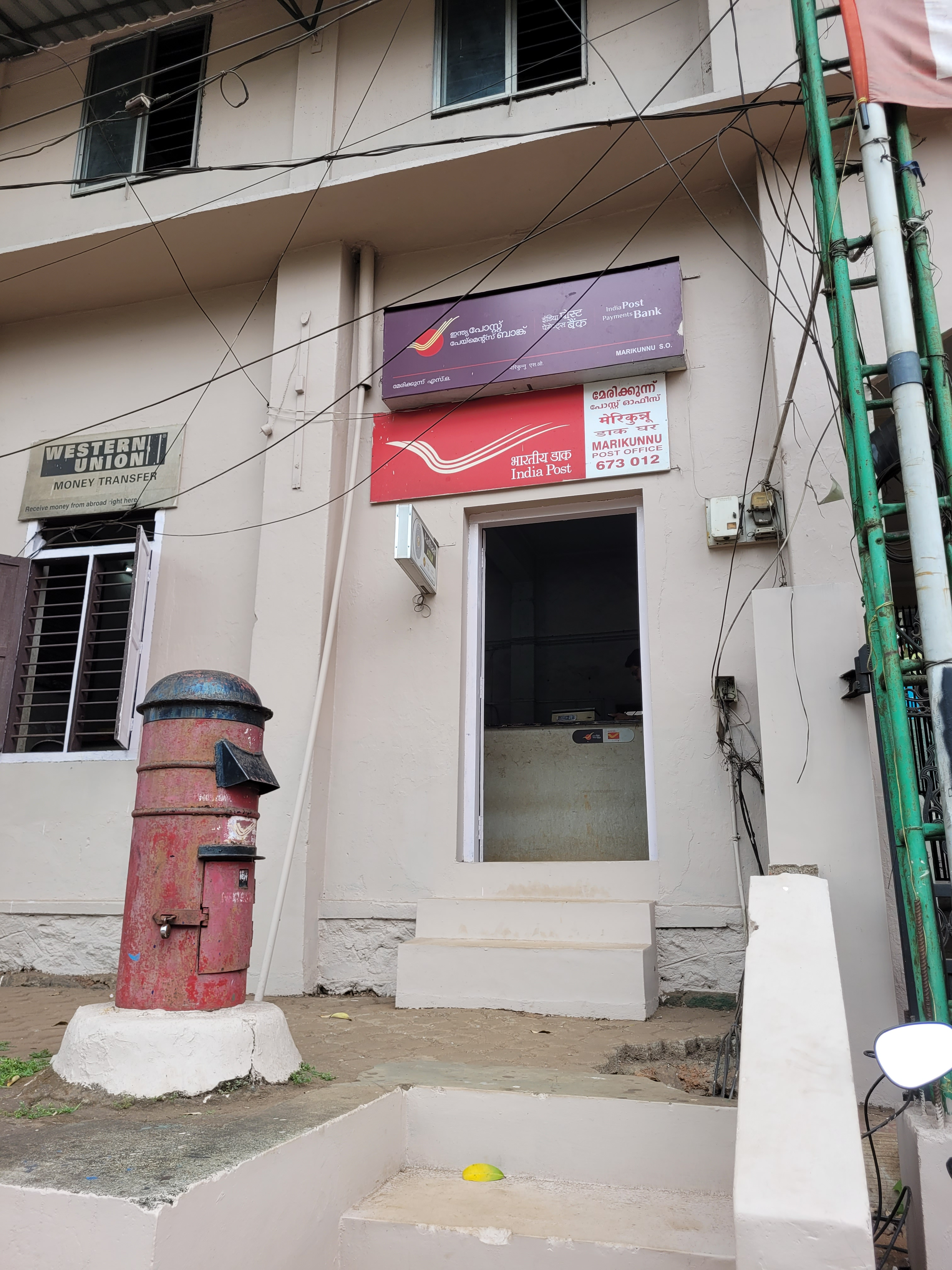
- Marikkunnu Post Office
- Interactive map of Marikkunnu
- Coordinates: 11.29062°N 75.83004°E
- Country: India
- State: Kerala
- Post office: Marikkunnu

Marikkunnu (മേരിക്കുന്ന്) and Vellimadukunnu are two close places and suburban residential areas located on the periphery of Kozhikode in Kerala, India. Nirmala Hospital, JDT Islam Institutions and Government Law College, Kozhikode are located in this place.

== Educational Institutions ==
Many professional colleges and schools are situated in Marikkunnu.

List of institutions
| Name | Courses | Remarks |
|---|---|---|
| Government Law College, Kozhikode | 5 years LLB, 3 years LLB, LLM | Government College |
| Nirmala College of Nursing | B.Sc Nursing | Run by The Ursuline Sisters of Mary Immaculate |
| JDT Islam College of Nursing | B.Sc Nursing | JDT Islam Orphanage & Educational Institutions |
| JDT Islam College of Arts And Science | | JDT Islam Orphanage & Educational Institutions |
| JDT Polytechnic College | AUTOMOBILE; COMPUTER HARDWARE, ELECTRONICS; ELECTRICAL & ELECTRONICS | JDT Islam Orphanage & Educational Institutions |
| Silver Hills Public School | CBSE | Carmelites of Mary Immaculate fathers |
| Silver Hills Higher Secondary School | Kerala state 1-10, 12th | Carmelites of Mary Immaculate fathers |

== See also ==
- Government Law College, Kozhikode
- Kovoor Town
- Kuttikkattoor
- Chevayur
- Pavangad, Kozhikode
- Chelpram
- Parambil Bazaar
