= Sreedhanya Suresh =

Indian civil servant

Sub Collector & Sub-divisional Magistrate of Perinthalmanna
- Incumbent
- Assumed office 29 June 2021
- Appointed by: Government of Kerala
- Chief Minister: Pinarayi Vijayan

Assistant Collector of Kozhikode
- In office 11 June 2020 – 29 June 2021
- Appointed by: Governor of Kerala

Personal details
- Born: 30 December 1991 (age 34) Wayanad, Kerala, India
- Education: M.Sc. (Zoology)
- Alma mater: Devagiri College, Kozhikode
- Occupation: Bureaucrat

Sreedhanya Suresh is an Indian Administrative Service officer. She is the First Tribal Woman from Kerala to have cleared Civil Services Examination conducted by Union Public Service Commission, India. She secured an all India Rank of 410 in the 2018 UPSC Civil Services Examination. She is currently serving as (IG) Inspector General of Registration in the Department of Registration, Government of Kerala.

== Early life and education ==
Sreedhanya Suresh was born and raised in Kerala, India. She hails from the Kurichiya tribal community, an indigenous group in the Wayanad district of Kerala. Despite facing various socio-economic challenges, Sreedhanya's determination and dedication towards education propelled her forward. She completed her schooling from a local government school and then pursued a Bachelor's degree in Zoology from St. Joseph's College, Devagiri.

== Background ==
Sreedhanya Suresh belong to Kurichiya tribal family in Wayanad, Kerala. Her parents, Suresh and Kamala are daily wage labourers who trade in bows and arrows in the local market. As a child growing up in an unfinished house, she did not have access to the basic amenities of life. She grew up in the Ambalkkolly tribal settlement in Wayanad district. A leaking roof and even clothes lined up to make do for walls in the house do not deter Sreedhanya from her being a good student during her schooldays. In spite of all the difficulties and poverty, education remained a priority and this proved fruitful for the whole family.

== Career ==
In her first attempt in 2018, she secured an All India Rank of 410 and became the first person from the tribal community to qualify for the IAS.

After successfully clearing the examination, Sreedhanya underwent rigorous training at the Lal Bahadur Shastri National Academy of Administration (LBSNAA) in Mussoorie, Uttarakhand. The academy is renowned for nurturing and grooming aspiring civil servants.

Upon completing her training, Sreedhanya Suresh was allocated the Kerala cadre of the Indian Administrative Service in 2019. As an IAS officer, she began her career serving as the Assistant Collector at Kozhikode before becoming as the Sub Collector of Perinthalmanna. She is currently serving as Inspector General of Registration(IG) of Registration Department, Government of Kerala

== Motivation ==
Dignitaries like P. Sathasivam, Pinarai Vijayan, Rahul Gandhi, Priyanka Gandhi, and many others around the country congratulated her for her success in the examination.

== Recognition and awards ==
In 2019, Sreedhanya was conferred with the "Kudumbashree Award" by the Government of Kerala for her outstanding achievement in the civil services examination. The award recognized her as a role model for women and marginalized communities.
