= Kuttikkattoor and Velliparamba =

Kuttikkattoor
- village
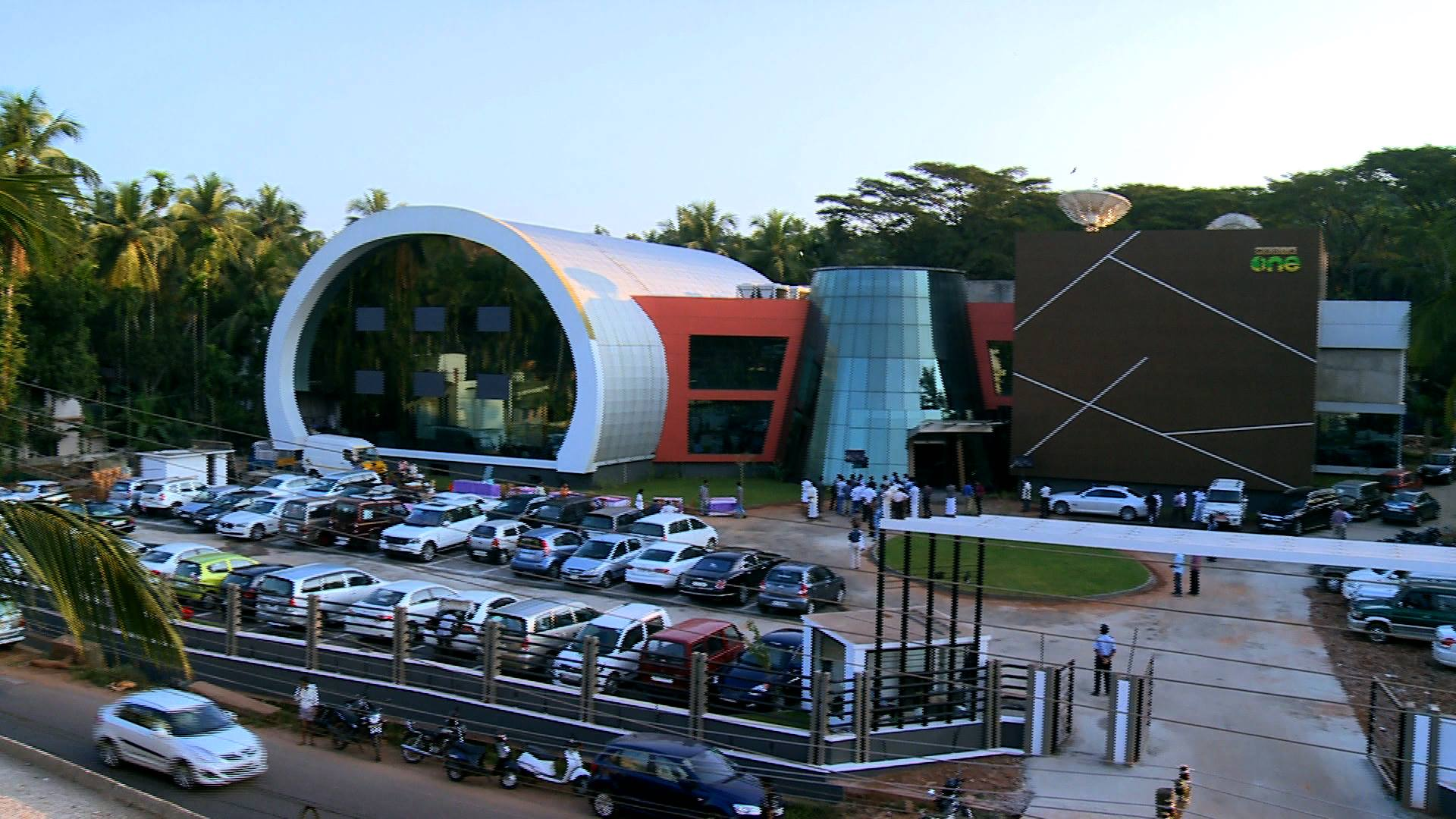
- Media One TV office
- Interactive map of Kuttikkattoor
- Coordinates: 11°16′0″N 75°52′30″E
- Country: India
- State: Kerala
- District: Kozhikode

Population (2011)
  - Total: 25,929

Languages
  - Official: Malayalam, English
- Time zone: UTC+5:30 (IST)
- Vehicle registration: KL-

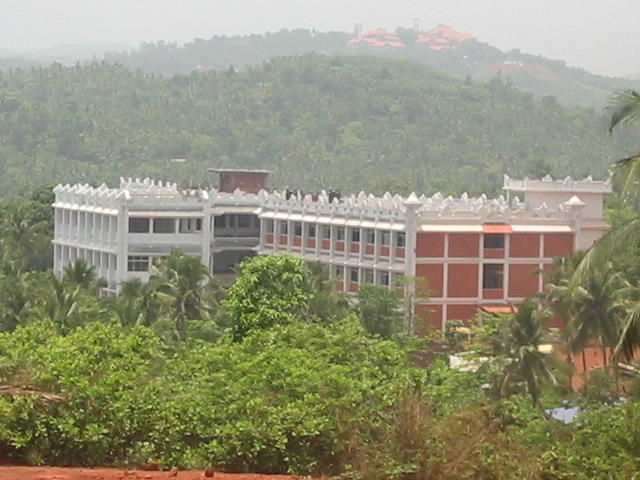
AWH Engineering College, Kuttikkattoor

Kuttikkattoor and Velliparamba are two adjacent suburbs of Kozhikode city separated by three kilometres on the road to Mavoor. These villages are also connected to Palazhi and Pantheeramkavu areas.

== Etymology ==
Velliparamba is sometimes described by local names like Ancham Mile and Aram Mile. Keezhmadu, Poojapura, Mampuzha, Ummalathoor, Kovoor Town, Chemmathoor, Punathil Bazar, Mayanad, Peruvayal, Perumanna, and Poovattuparamba are the adjoining villages.

== Important organizations ==
- MediaOne TV
- Devagiri College
- Calicut Medical College
- AWH Engineering College
- Center for Water Resources Development and Management (CWRDM)
- AWH Polytechnic College
- Government High School Kuttikkattoor
- Bee Line Public School Kuttikkattoor
- Imbichali Usthad Memorial Islamic Center(IMIC) College
- NOEL Crest Villas Atarwala Road Velliparamba Calicut

== Suburbs and villages ==
- Poovattuparamba, Kizhmadu and Mattummal
- V.N.Road, Saraswsathynagar, Chelavoor and Moozhikkal
- Anchammile, Arammile and Anakuzhikara

== See also ==
- Kovoor Town
- Devagiri
- Calicut Medical College
- Chevayur
- Palazhi
- Silver Hills
