= Peruvayal =

- Village
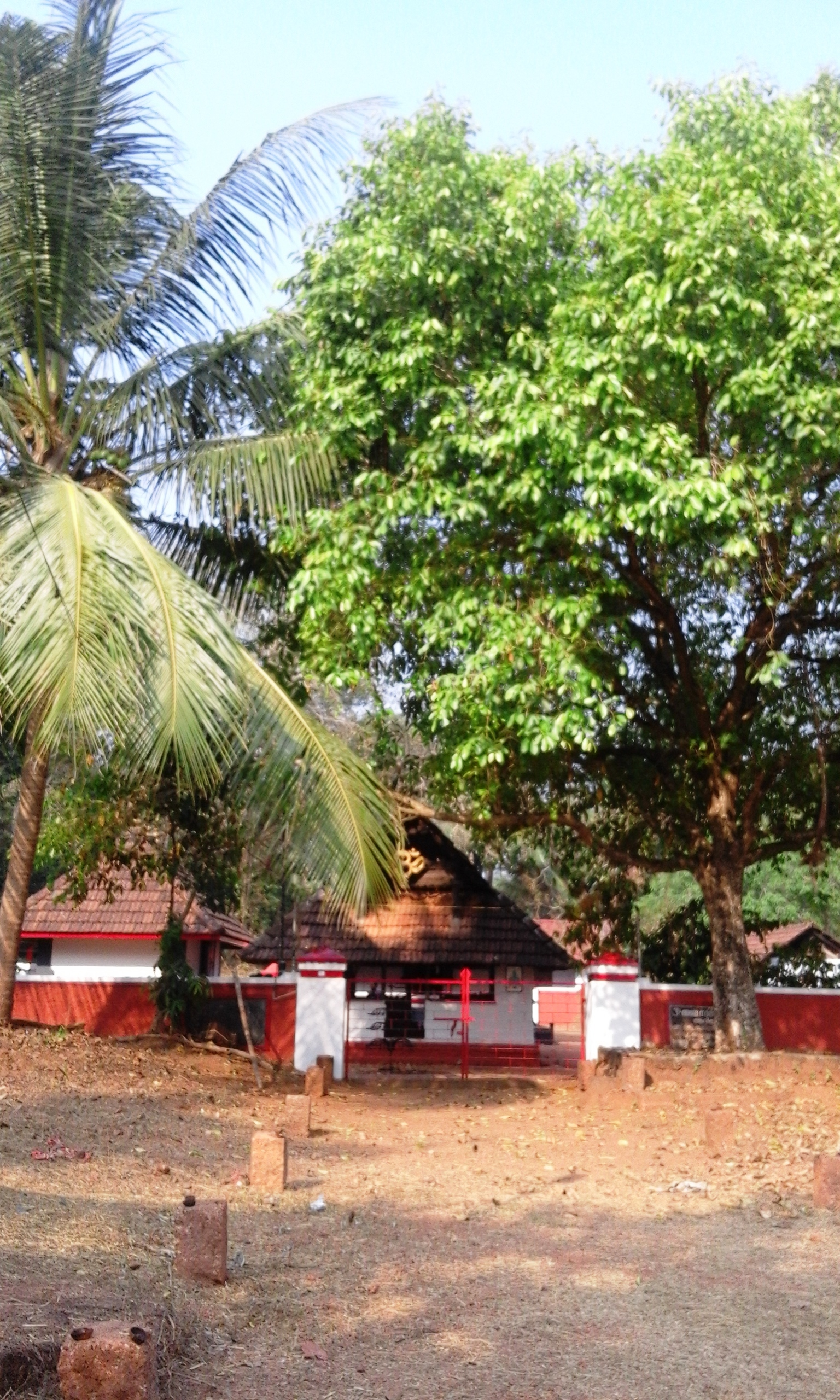
- Sree Kattayattu Devi Temple, Peruvayal
- Interactive map of Peruvayal
- Coordinates: 11.25°N 75.90°E
- Country: India
- State: Kerala
- District: Kozhikode
- Established: 1962

Government
  - Body: Peruvayal Grama Panchayat

Area
  - Total: 26.39 km^{2} (10.19 sq mi)
- Elevation: 421 m (1,381 ft)

Population
  - Total: 47,700
  - Density: 1,810/km^{2} (4,680/sq mi)

Languages
  - Official: Malayalam, English
- Time zone: UTC+5:30 (IST)
- PIN: 673008
- Telephone code: 0495-XXXXX
- Vehicle registration: KL-11
- Sex ratio: 1:1 ♂/♀

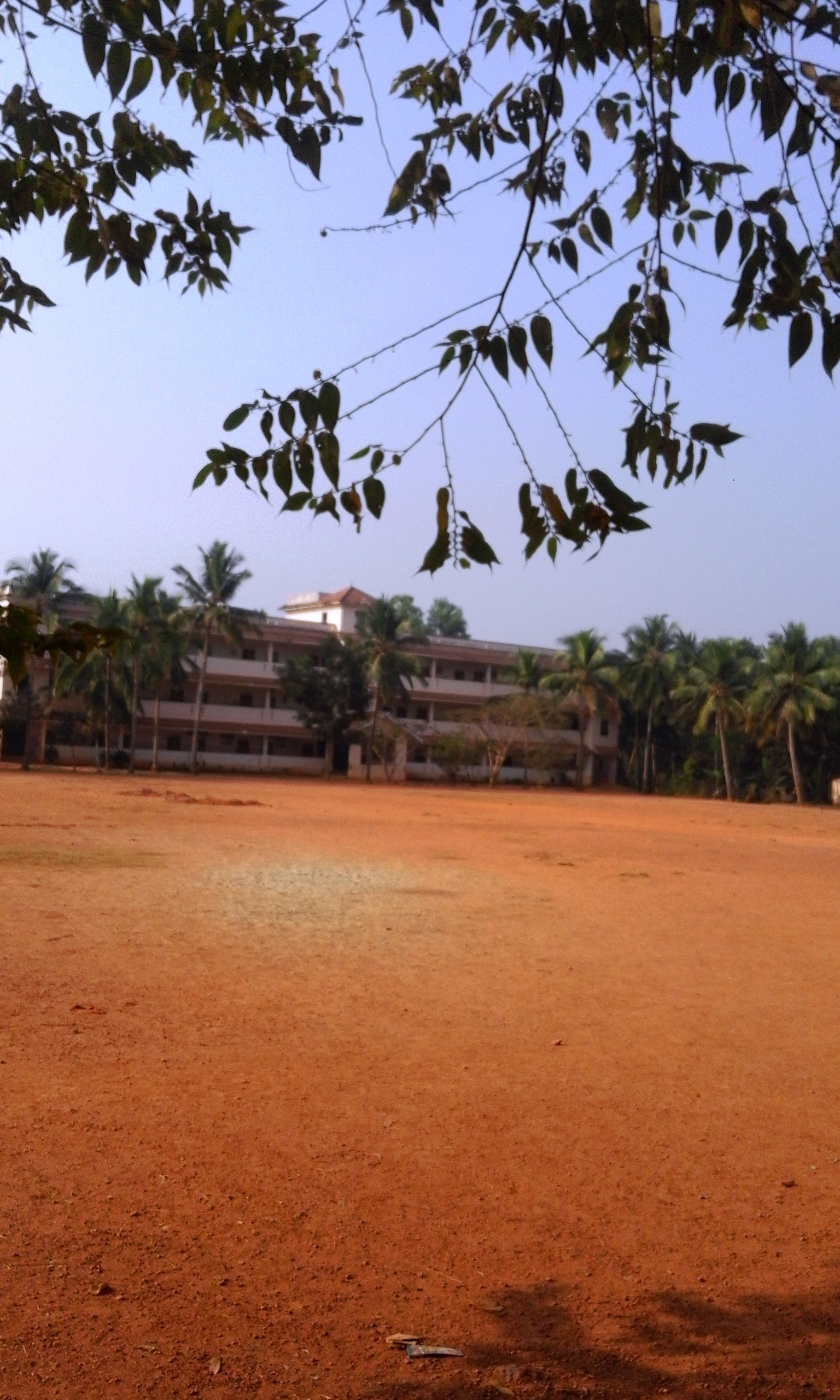
Peruvayal St. Xavier's School

Peruvayal is the largest village in Kozhikode district in the Indian state of Kerala. This village is surrounded by Panchayaths of Mavoor, Kunnamangalam, Olavanna and Kozhikode corporation. The Chaliyar river forms one of the borders of Peruvayal and is 15 km away from Kozhikode.

== Demographics ==
Peruvayal panchayat population
Year	Pop.	±%
2001	38,462	—
2011	47,700	+24.0%
Source: Census of India

== Etymology ==
As the name suggest it is the "largest paddy field" (Peru means plenty and vayal means paddy field in Malayalam).

== Government institutions ==
The village office is situated at Poovattuparamba. Six desoms divide Peruvayal village, namely Kayalam, Peruvayal, Poovattuparamba, Cherukulathur, Peringolam and Mundakkal.

== Geography ==
Paddy fields are present throughout the village. Small hills are present. The Hill 'Ponpara' is known for its iron ore content and water storage. Ponds provide water for irrigation. Paddy fields in Peruvayal village face threat from land and real estate mafias.

== Culture ==
Peruvayal is famous for its religious harmony. Temples, Mosques and Churches are situated nearby. Arts and sports clubs drive cultural aspirations. Drama and Oppana are performed. Cherukulathur Public Library-KP Govindhan Kutty Smaraka Vayanasala- and Jhanapradhayini Vayanashala Peringolam have been sources of inspiration for more than two decades. Samskara poshini vayanasala and KASC kayalam are two organisations which encourage cultural and religious harmony in kayalam.

== Climate ==
The district has a generally humid climate with a hot season extending from March to May. The most important rainy season is during the southwest monsoon, which starts in the first week of June and extends to September. The northeast monsoon extends from the second half of October through November. Average annual rainfall is 3266 mm. The best weather is found towards the end of the year, in December and January.

== Industries ==
- Kilban Foods India Pvt. Ltd (Happy) Poovattuparamba
- MINAR ISPAT PVT LTD, Anakuzhikkara, Kuttikatoor
- MILMA-MRCMPU Kozhikode Dairy, Peringolam
- Vimala Rubber Plantation, Kayalam

== Educational institutions ==
- Kayalam ALP School, Kayalam
- St. Xavier's UP School
- GHSS Kuttikatoor
- Savithri Devi Saboo Memorial College for Women, Kalleri, Peruvayal
- A.W.H. Engineering College, Kuttikatoor
- A.W.H. Polytechnic College, Kuttikatoor
- GHSS Peringolam
