= M. R. Rajagopal =

Indian palliative care physician (born 1947)

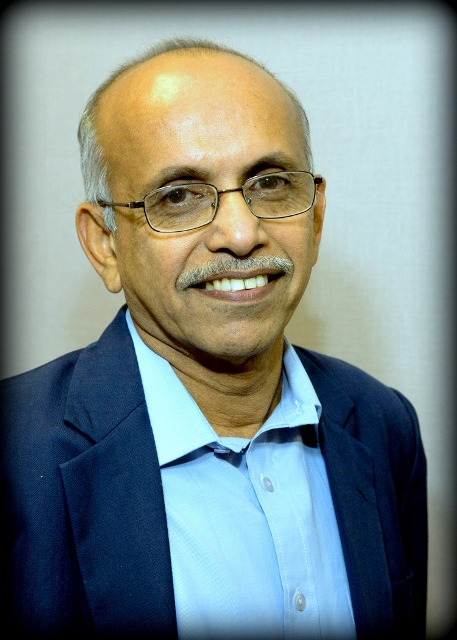
- Born: 23 September 1947 (age 79); Trivandrum, Kerala, India
- Years active: 1994–present
- Known for: Pioneer in palliative medicine in India
- Medical career
- Profession: Physician
- Field: Palliative Medicine
- Institutions: Medical College, Trivandrum; Medical College, Calicut; Pain and Palliative Care Society, Calicut; Trivandrum Institute of Palliative Sciences
- Awards: Padma Shri (2018)

M. R. Rajagopal (born 23 September 1947) is an Indian palliative care physician (anesthesiologist) and professor referred to as the 'father of palliative care in India' in honour of his significant contribution to the palliative care scene in India.

Rajagopal is the Founder Chairman of Pallium India, a palliative care non-governmental organisation formed in 2003 and based in Kerala, India.

Rajagopal was the prime mover in the creation of the National Program for Palliative Care (NPPC) by the Ministry of Health of Government of India.

His advocacy has contributed to amendment of Narcotic Drugs and Psychotropic Substances (NDPS) Act of India in 2014 and in its implementation—a critical step in reducing needless suffering and allowing millions to access pain relief.

A documentary film based on Rajagopal's life, titled 'Hippocratic: 18 Experiments in Gently Shaking the World' was released by Moonshine Agency, Australia, on World Palliative Care Day, 14 October 2017.

In 2018, the Indian Government honoured Rajagopal with the Padma Shri award, "one of the highest civilian awards" instituted in India for distinguished service. He was nominated in 2018 and 2023 for the Nobel Peace Prize.

He published his memoir 'Walk with the Weary' in 2022, where he shares lessons he learned while walking along the road of life limiting illness with people who changed his outlook on what matters the most when living with a critical illness, and also at the end of life.

Rajagopal has co-authored many Lancet Commission reports and was one of the authors of the report on 'Value of Death' published in 2022.

== Positions held ==
Rajagopal holds the following positions:

- Chairman of Pallium India
- Director, W.H.O Collaborating Centre for Policy and Training on Access to Pain Relief (Trivandrum Institute of Palliative Sciences)
- Member, Elisabeth Kubler-Ross Foundation Board

Rajagopal is on the editorial board of several international journals and has authored/edited two textbooks, several book chapters (including Oxford Textbook of Palliative Medicine) and more than 30 publications in scientific journals.

Current involvement with scientific journals:

- Member, Editorial Board, Indian Journal of Palliative Care.
- Member, Editorial Board, Journal of Pain and Symptom Management.
- Member, Editorial Board, Journal of Pain and Palliative Care Pharmacotherapy.
- Member, Editorial Board, Palliative Care: Research and Treatment.
- Member, Editorial Board, Pain: Clinical Updates; International Association for Study of Pain.

== Achievements ==
Rajagopal is one of the founders of Pain and Palliative Care Society (PPCS) in Medical College, Calicut, Kerala in 1993. In 1995, PPCS was recognized as a model demonstration project by the World Health Organization for community based palliative care activities. It set up an Institute of Palliative Medicine (IPM), with numerous link centres.

Since 1996, Rajagopal has been working with the WHO Collaborating Center at Madison-Wisconsin and with Government of India to improve opioid availability in India.

In 2003, he with colleagues created Pallium India, a registered charitable trust with the intention of spreading palliative care to areas in India where they did not exist, and for palliative care advocacy. By 2016, the organization reached 15 of India's 29 states. In 2006, Pallium India created the Trivandrum Institute of Palliative Sciences (TIPS) as its training, research and clinical demonstration unit. In 2012, TIPS was declared a WHO Collaborating Centre.

He was elected as Lifetime International Association for Hospice and Palliative Care (IAHPC) Board Advisor in 2012.

Rajagopal is one of the five lead authors of the Lancet Commission report published in October 2017, which pointed out that more than 61 million people live in pain and suffering worldwide every year without access to palliative care. The report describes a possible global strategy for correction in this huge inequity in care and suggests and a low-cost essential package which could remedy the situation.

Rajagopal's contribution has been significant in bringing the Parliament of India to amend the draconian Narcotic Drugs and Psychotropic Substances (NDPS) Act of 1985. The Amendment was passed in 2014 Feb.

In 2014, Rajagopal was honored by Human Rights Watch with Alison Des Forges Award for Extraordinary Activism, in recognition of his efforts to defend the right of patients to live and die with dignity.

In 2017, Rajagopal was named one of the 30 most influential leaders in hospice and palliative medicine by American Academy of Hospice and Palliative Medicine (AAHPM).

The Government of India, in 2018, honoured Rajagopal with the Padma Shri award, "one of the highest civilian awards" for distinguished service in healthcare.

Rajagopal published his memoir 'Walk with the Weary' in 2022, sharing his journey as a palliative care advocate and practitioner.

Rajagopal co-authored many Lancet Commission reports including the 'Value of Death' report published in 2022.

== Awards and honours ==
- Asian Scientist 100, Asian Scientist, 2019
- Government of India's Padma Shri award in 2018
- Visionary in Hospice and Palliative Medicine by American Academy of Hospice and Palliative Medicine
- Healers of India award instituted by Appollo Hospitals and Network18.
- Navjeevan Inspiration of the Year award
- T.N.G Award conferred in memory of T. N. Gopakumar, the late Editor in Chief of Asianet News, in January 2017.
- Cancer Aid Society Annual Award for Excellence and Leadership in Palliative Care for the South Asian Association for Regional Cooperation (SAARC) Countries
- Kairali People Doctors Award, 2015.
- Alison Des Forges Award for Extraordinary Activism by Human Rights Watch in 2014.
- Dr Palpu Memorial award, Dr Palpu Foundation, November 2012
- Award for Excellence in Pain Management in Developing Countries: International Association for Study of Pain, Montreal, Canada. October 2009
- Marie Nyswander award, International Association for Pain and Chemical Dependency, New York, 31 October 2008
- "Care and Share" annual award for Social work. "Care and Share", USA, February 2007.
